= Mahratta, Wahroonga =

Mahratta
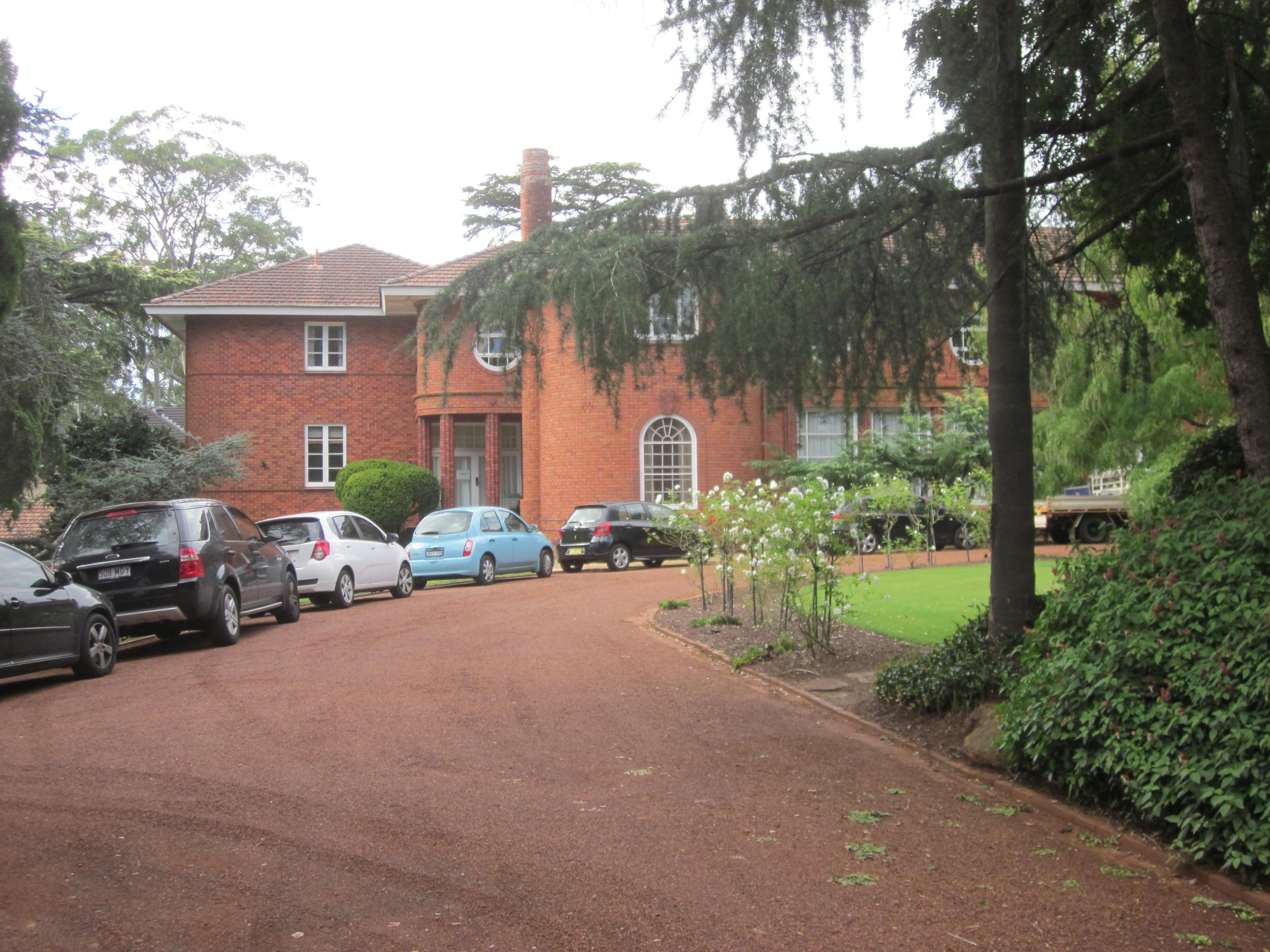
- Mahratta, 1526 Pacific Highway, Wahroonga

- Location within Sydney Location within Australia
- 33°43′37″S 151°07′06″E
- Location: 1526 Pacific Highway, Wahroonga, Ku-ring-gai Council, New South Wales, Australia

History
- Built: 1941

Site notes
- Architects: Douglas S. Agnew; Arthur Palin (original Federation house); Paul Sorensen (garden)
- Architectural style: Art Deco
- Owner: The School of Philosophy

New South Wales Heritage Register
- Official name: Mahratta and Site; Heatherlee
- Type: State heritage (landscape)
- Designated: 2 April 1999
- Reference no.: 708
- Type: Garden House
- Category: Parks, Gardens and Trees

Mahratta is a heritage-listed former residence and bank executive training facility and now is the community group headquarters for the School of Practical Philosophy. It is located at 1526 Pacific Highway, Wahroonga, Ku-ring-gai Council, New South Wales, Australia. It was designed by Douglas S. Agnew, Arthur Palin (original Federation House) and Paul Sorensen (garden) and built in 1941. It is also known as Mahratta and Site and Heatherlee. The property is owned by The School of Philosophy. It was added to the New South Wales State Heritage Register on 2 April 1999.

== History ==
In 1838 Governor Darling made a 260-hectare (640-acre) land grant to emancipated convict, Thomas Hyndes. Hyndes had been in possession of the land since 1830, working it with convict labour and supplying timber to the colony. In 1840 he sold the land and in 1854 it was again sold, to John Brown, timber merchant. Brown bought it to cut as much timber off the land as possible.

An 3.4-hectare (8.5-acre) property of the Bank of NSW. It was part of John Brown's 260 hectares (640 acres) which he purchased from the first pioneer of the district, Thomas Hyndes. This land extended from Pearce's Corner, Wahroonga, fronting Lane Cove Road to a short distance beyond its junction with Fox Valley Road and extending to the boundary of the Lane Cove River. Brown aspired to own a square mile of land. This was a magnificent forest area then. Brown cleared land for an orchard and felling forest trees for timber. His expanding interests led to the name "The Squire". The names of Brown's sons and daughters have been perpetuated in the names of Lucinda, Ada and Roland Avenues, Wahroonga, in the vicinity.

=== Ownership under Gerald Allen ===
No real subdivision was effected until 1893, when Francis Gerard purchased "The Foxground Estate" from John Brown. This land at the corner of Fox Valley Road and Lane Cove Road (Pacific Highway), Wahroonga was known as 'Brown's Paddock'. It passed through several hands until a Mr Gerald Allen became owner (in 1912: Garden Clubs of Australia, 2016, 18) and renamed it from Heverlee to Mahratta after a Bombala sheep station where his grandfather was overseer. The name Mahratta comes from the powerful Hindu warriors Marathas from the region of Mahā Rāṣṭra meaning "The Great Kingdom or Nation" in Sanskrit.

Under the direction of architect Arthur Palin, Mr Allen made extensions and upgraded the substantial Federation home. The mansion was noted for its cedar staircase and copper ceiling in the billiard room.

Allen commissioned garden designer Paul Sorensen in 1925 to lay out its then 8-hectare (20-acre) garden (now 1.6 hectares (4.0 acres)). His design created two levels divided by a graceful balustrade wall with steps leading from the upper level down to a sunken rose garden, croquet court and extensive lawns. Exotic trees were planted including cedars (Cedrus deodara/Himalayan cedar and weeping blue Atlas cedar, C.atlantica 'Pendula'), other conifers, maples (Acer spp.) and oaks (Quercus spp.), many coming from Sorensen's nursery in Leura. Other trees thought to have been planted at this time include the Queensland firewheel tree (Stenocarpus sinuatus), crows foot ash (Flindersia australis), bunya-bunya pine (Araucaria bidwillii) and tallowwood (Eucalyptus microcorys). All have matured to become magnificent trees.

=== Ownership by James Joynton Smith ===
Allen sold in 1930 to Sir James Joynton Smith who was a member of the NSW Legislative Council, Lord Mayor of Sydney and owner of the Carrington Hotel in Katoomba.

=== Ownership under the Field family ===
In 1939 Sir James sold Mahratta to Caragabal Pastoral Co. Pty Limited, a company associated with the family of Thomas Alfred (T.A.) Field, wealthy grazier and meat merchant (who with his brothers had inherited their father's wholesale and retail butchery business). As well as developing the company's wholesale and export trade they purchased pastoral properties throughout eastern Australia.

Field had the old house demolished in 1940 and built the present mansion in 1941 in the old house's footprint. He commissioned architect Douglas S Agnew to design the present building (not the Abercrombie wing to its north-west) and it was completed in 1941. Designed in the Art Deco style accounts for the theatrical charm and majesty of the house, no less exemplified than in the experience of the entry and main hall with its curved, scagliola finished staircase, curved wall and pilasters. It is acknowledged as one of the finest Art Deco mansions in Sydney even though it was completed well after the Art Deco period ended.

On its completion Field brought Sorensen back to extend and complement his design of the original garden. The curving red gravel driveway was built and Sorensen oversaw planting of the front lawn and the two dawn redwoods (Metasequoia glyptostroboides) and two red Japanese maples (Acer palmatum) that frame the entrance to the house's porte-cochere. The wide garden (bed)s facing the house are filled with colourful shrubs set against a backdrop of trees, lily pillies (Syzygium spp.) and other rainforest trees were planted to blend in with the exotics elsewhere in the garden. The walled courtyard at the back (north) of the house leads out through a moon gate to lawns shaded by two Himalayan cedars and on to the pleasant Refectory Courtyard to the left (west). To the right (east) is the tennis court with luxuriant plantings of Rhapis palms and rhododendrons between it and the house and a long garden bed of azaleas and camellias on the eastern (Pacific Highway) boundary.

Mr Field died in 1944 but his widow Jessie, continued to live in Mahratta until 1960.

=== Bank training college ===
The two-storey house of 1,400-square-metre (15,000 ft^{2}) together with tennis courts and swimming pool was bought in 1960 by the Bank of NSW (now Westpac Banking Corporation) for use as a training college for its senior officers. Four full-time gardeners were employed. Sorensen was retained by the bank to "redesign and develop the grounds to a very high standard".

Possibly the most significant planting of the time included the cedars, now mature, planted close to the house. The bunya-bunya pine near to the Fox Valley Road boundary is a local landmark. The major landscaping feature included in the design of the new mansion was the continuous brick fence with its magnificent gateways, matching that of the main house. The bank made some alterations and extensions made to the residence, which were designed by the same architect in a manner sensitive to the original house in scale, materials and details.

In the mid-1960s while they worked in Telegraph Road, Pymble, and others in the vicinity Brian Smith (the only apprentice to landscape architect and nurseryman, Paul Sorensen) (and sometimes Ib Sorensen) lived for more than two years in the attic of an old coach house nearby. They brought supplies and cooked their own meals. One of the jobs they worked on at this time was Mahratta on the corner of Fox Valley Road and the Pacific Highway.

The bank in 1964 built the new three-storey Abercrombie wing to the house's north-west, for residential purposes. Though the bricks are closely matched (the original quarries were re-opened for their manufacture), there was no attempt to replicate the Art Deco forms of the rest of the building.

=== Ownership under The School of Philosophy ===
Mahratta was acquired in 1990 by the School of Philosophy which uses it as a venue to conduct public courses in practical philosophy. It also holds events such as lectures, workshops and residential retreats for human development.

In 1991 Ku-Ring-Gai Municipal Council received 1,915 square metres (20,610 sq ft) of land as a section 94 contribution from development to the west of Mahratta, which formed part of Gerald Allen's 1912 purchases. The western section of the land purchased by Ross Field in 1946 formed part of this development. Council has since (2011) made a pocket park on Mahratta's northern edge, named "Curtilage Park".

The School of Philosophy's members recognise the historic significance of the property and wish to keep it in good order for future generations. The Friends of Mahratta was established in 2010 to raise much-needed funds for the care of the property. All proceeds from open house and garden events go to the upkeep of the property and students also volunteer help to assist with maintenance.

== Description ==
=== Site and garden ===
The 1.6-hectare (4.0-acre) property is bounded on the east by the Pacific Highway and on the south by Fox Valley Road. A loop driveway off Fox Valley Road to the porte-cochere of the house's southern side sweeps down to the southeast corner of the road with the Pacific Highway. Between house and highway is a tennis court with a pavilion on its western (facing the house) side and a path leads through shrubs and trees lining the eastern boundary.

Expansive lawns flank the house's south-west, south and south-east. To the south-west is a lower terrace (formerly a croquet green) with a pergola to its north (sited mid-way along the house's western wing's facade) with two flights of steps above and below it. Below the croquet green is a terraced formal rose garden. In the far southwest of the property (in 1990) is a cottage. A side drive leads to this off the Fox Valley Road gate.

On the house's northern side is a formal courtyard formed by two wings. A high brick wall and moon gate lead from this into less and less formal garden areas. Northeast of the moon gate is a summer house. Another drive leads from the northeast corner of the house east to the Pacific Highway, around the north of the tennis court. North of the house are wide lawn areas and to the northwest a woodland area. Northwest of the house is a service area with two small sheds and west of that a mixed shrubbery, north of the rose garden.

This garden more than any other, shows its designer Paul Sorensen's ability to combine exotic and native trees into a cohesive design. His usual range of exotic plants is very evident: Himalayan cedars (Cedrus deodara), maples, English oak (Quercus robur), tulip trees (Liriodendron tulipifera), sweet gum (Liquidambar styraciflua). To these, he added other conifers such as dawn redwoods (Metasequoia glyptostroboides) and Araucaria species as well as exotic broadleaf trees common in Sydney: Jacaranda mimosifolia and Cape chestnut (Cupania capensis). With this considerable mix is a range of native trees, mostly from the moister coastal zones, the leaves of which are mostly in rich glossy greens which blend with, complement and add to the richness of foliage so evident in the garden.

These native trees include the Queensland firewheel tree (Stenocarpus sinuatus), gap axe/ coogara/coogera or rose tamarind (Arytera divaricata), Queensland nut (Macadamia integrifolia), lily pilly (Syzygium luehmannii), lemon scented gum (Corymbia citriodora), lacebark (Brachychiton discolor) and Illawarra flame tree (B.acerifolius). Two other rare trees in the garden are the rose apple (Syzygium jambos) and a karaka or New Zealand laurel (Corynocarpus laevigatus), both along the eastern Pacific Highway frontage. A diverse range of shrubs also adorn the southern and eastern borders of the property, including tree gardenia (G.thunbergii), Camellia japonica cv.s, Gordonia axillaris and others.

It is difficult to know which trees were planted by Sorensen as there appears to have been a considerable garden here before he began. He carried out extensive tree surgery to many of the old trees and trained wisteria (W.sinensis) from tangled heaps into more manageable plants. The understorey was completely cleared out and, after fumigation to kill oxalis and onion weed infestations, was replanted with the present shrubbery.

A wide variety of trees is used to delineate and articulate the spaces around the house, while also providing a dense tree cover around the two street boundaries to block heavy traffic noise from the nearby highway. Belts of trees are under-planted with azaleas (Rhododendron indicum cv.s), rhododendrons, magnolias and other shrubs. A red gravel drive featuring detailed brick edging, annual beds and standard roses divides the lawn. Each side of the porte-cochère is marked by a dawn redwood tree (Metasequoia glyptostroboides). Sorensen included a clipped yew hedge (Taxus baccata) against the front wall of the house but most of this was missing by 1990.

On sunken terraces to the south-west of the house are a rose garden and a lawn used for putting and croquet. These two elements are separated by a tall hedge, mostly made up of native vegetation, whilst the stair linking them is canopied over by a remarkable weeping Himalayan cedar (Cedrus deodara Pendula).

The rose garden is very formal in its layout and quite a departure from Paul Sorensen's usual style, although he had previously designed such a garden at Rannock, Blayney and was later to design another at Fernhill, Mulgoa. All the roses were chosen by Sorensen and carefully located on a drawing, although when it came to the central bed the drawing is noted "The best white available", leaving the choice somewhat open.

Above the rose garden, Sorensen indulged in his practice of (re-)using pieces of old buildings in gardens by positioning an elaborately carved coat of arms from an unknown Victorian style sandstone building. The placing (beside a set of steps at the southern end of the rose garden) appears to be rather arbitrary.

Altogether the garden at Mahratta is eminently suitable for its purpose and the four gardeners who tend it (in 1990) are justifiably proud of the standard of care they provide.

=== House ===
The main building of Mahratta is a two-storey Art Deco-influenced interwar house of red face brick with a hipped tiled roof. The exterior emphasises the streamlined and circle-based aspects of the style with circular windows, circular motifs in steel window grilles, horizontal string courses and panels of small ceramic tiles, rounded brick corners, circular chimneys and piers of unusual specially moulded curved face bricks (National Trust of Australia (NSW)).

The interior contains many original fittings and finishes demonstrating a high level of 1940s craftmanship. A sweeping staircase has a curved balustrade made of scagliola. Curved glazed doors slide into curved recesses.

Original Art Deco bathrooms and ball room, stone fireplaces, timber panelling in some rooms.

The house featured in an advertisement promoting gambling in 2018. Extensive shots of the formal interior areas, including a motorcycle being ridden down the main hall, and golf balls being hit from the grand staircase (improbably landing in the music room) give an idea of the internal architecture and fittings.

=== Modifications and dates ===
Used as Westpac Training Centre for a time, modifications made to accommodate this. Rewire complete 2019

== Heritage listing ==
As at 7 November 2013, Mahratta is a large, intact, 2 storey mansion erected in 1941 in an unusual style which combines Art Deco and Classical Georgian Revival elements. It is perhaps the largest and finest property of its type erected in wartime Sydney. The house replaced a substantial Federation period residence situated on a 3.5-hectare (8.6-acre) site in Warrawee but retained and incorporated the majority of the earlier landscape elements including a sunken rose garden and outbuildings. It was built for T. A. Field, a notable figure in the retail and wholesale meat industry, by the architect Douglas Agnew.

The house is substantially intact exhibiting a high degree of face brick, bronze and wrought iron detailing externally and is characterised by a dramatic porte-cochere on the south and an enclosed Pompeian Court on the north. Extended in 1964 by the addition of a west wing, the whole achieves a unity of style, form, texture and materials from the sensitively designed additions.

Internally, the house retains many features from the period, including a marble and scagliola oval staircase, a ballroom, an elliptical dining room, finely detailed joinery, and original fittings.

The property has historic associations and aesthetic values due to the involvement and advice of landscape designer Paul Sorensen in its garden. The open landscaped setting and mature plantings provide a fine setting and backdrop to the house. Red gravel driveways snaking through the open lawns reinforce the colour and texture of the house.

Occupation by the Westpac Banking Corporation since the 1960s, using the house as a Staff Training College has ensured a high level of maintenance to both the house and grounds. This has ensured that Mahratta has retained all of the essential characteristics of its cultural significance.

Separate statements of significance exist for the garage and chauffeur's quarters, gardener's cottage, tennis pavilion, laundry, sheds and greenhouses.

The open lawns and gardens to the north, east and south of the main house are an essential component in achieving a fine open setting for the house. To the west, the Croquet Lawn and Rose Garden with their backdrop of dense mature trees and shrubs are a key component of the cultural and historic setting having survived almost intact from the original (Federation era) house.

The open areas to the west of the property are of little cultural significance to the main house, but contain a series of very large native trees.

Reasons for listing; cultural, architectural, landmark value, state significance Note: grounds, fence, outbuilding to Fox Valley Road & garage building.

Mahratta was listed on the New South Wales State Heritage Register on 2 April 1999.

== See also ==
- Australian residential architectural styles
