= Paul Sorensen (landscape gardener) =

Australian nurseryman and landscape gardener (1891–1983)

- Born: 16 December 1891; Copenhagen, Denmark
- Died: 12 September 1983 (aged 91); Leura, Australia
- Occupation: Landscape gardener

Paul Edwin Bielenberg Sorensen (16 December 1891 – 12 September 1983) was a Danish-born Australian landscape gardener and nurseryman. After leaving Europe due to the outbreak of the First World War, Sorensen lived in Australia for the rest of his life, mostly in the Blue Mountains. He designed and planted over 100 gardens, of which the best known is "Everglades", in Leura, Australia.

== Early life ==
Paul Sorensen was born on 16 December 1891 at Frederiksberg, a town now part of the urban area of Copenhagen, Denmark, which is the site of two extensive public gardens, Frederiksberg Have and Søndermarken.

Sorensen was employed at a Copenhagen nursery, Hørsholm Planteskole, at the age of thirteen. He enrolled at the Hørsholm Tekniske Skole to study horticulture. For the last two years of this training, Sorensen was under the direction of Lars Nielsen, a leading horticulturist, who at that time was responsible for the design of much of the open spaces of Copenhagen. During that same period, Sorensen did garden maintenance work at Hvidøre, which at that time was a summer residence owned by King Christian IX's daughters, Queen Alexandra of the United Kingdom and Dowager Empress Maria Feodorovna of Russia. After performing national service, he worked in Germany, France, and Switzerland. He was employed by the landscape designers and contractors Mertens Bros.

Sorensen was later to state that it was the outbreak of the First World War (although his homeland Denmark was neutral) that motivated him to migrate to Australia, when he saw his French, German, Austrian, and Italian friends in Switzerland being recalled to their homelands for military service.

== Career in Australia ==
Sorensen arrived in Australia in 1915. He initially found employment as a farmhand in Victoria, prior to getting work at Ormond Plant Farm propagating ferns. He moved to the Blue Mountains and obtained work as a gardener at the Carrington Hotel at Katoomba. He opened a plant nursery, called Sorensen's Nursery, at Katoomba, before moving the business in 1920 to Leura, a nearby mountain village that would become his lifelong home.

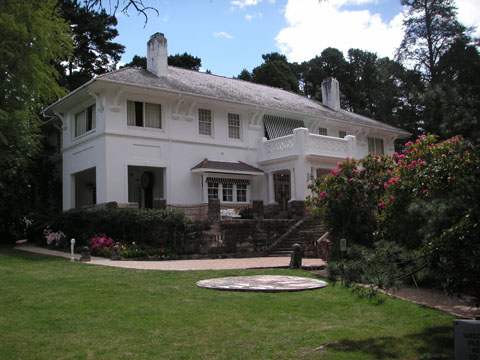
"Leuralla" at Leura, N.S.W.

Initially maintaining existing gardens, Sorensen was soon planting large gardens for wealthy people who had homes in the Blue Mountains. During the 1920s, he created gardens in the area for the residences "Sylvan Mists", "Gabo", "La Vista" at Wentworth Falls, "Dean [or Dene] Park", and "Cheppen". Sorensen assisted Lady Fairfax, the widow of the Sydney newspaper magnate Sir James Oswald Fairfax (1863–1928), with the garden of "Sospel" at Leura. He also improved an existing garden in Leura, "Leuralla". Sorensen's garden designs influenced other gardens in the Blue Mountains, such as "Benison", at Leura.

Sorensen redesigned and expanded an existing garden at "Mahratta" at Wahroonga, in 1925 for its then owner, Gerald Allen of the mercantile firm Samuel Allen & Sons. After 1930, Sorensen also worked for the next owner of "Mahratta", James Joynton Smith who, as owner of the Carrington Hotel, had given Sorensen his first work in Australia as a gardener. In 1932, he started a garden at "Heaton Lodge", Mudgee, for the Loneragan family, owners of the town's department store; this was the first garden that he created in an area of relatively low rainfall.

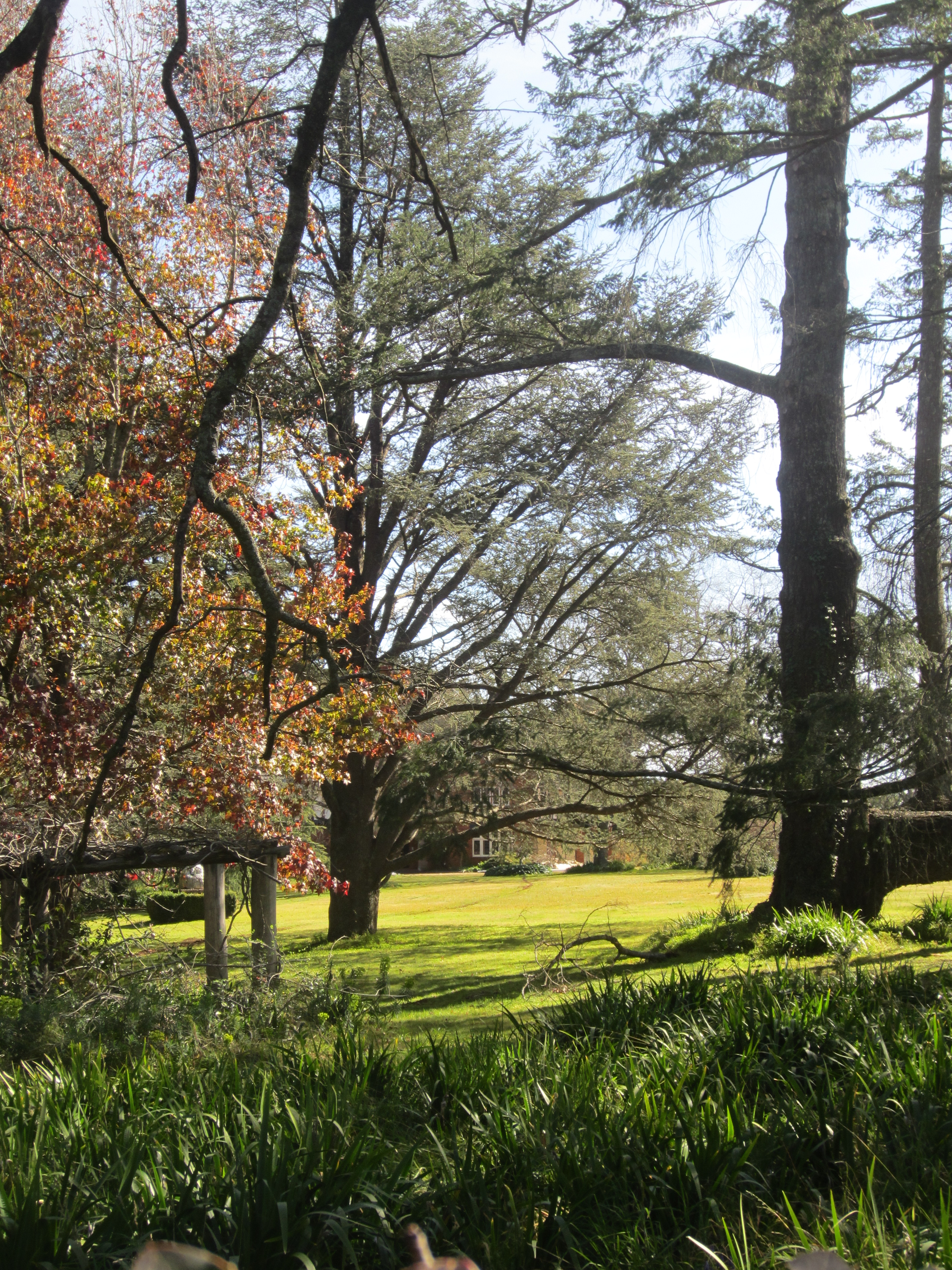
"Invergowrie" viewed from Bundanoon Road, Exeter, N.S.W. - Part of the garden with house in the background. (Sept. 2020)

In 1933, Sorensen met Henri van der Velde, a Belgian-born manufacturer and the owner of Feltex Carpets, who had a vision for a garden at "Everglades", Leura; this garden would become probably Sorensen's best known. During the 1930s, Sorensen worked for seed supplier Anderson & Co in garden design, while keeping his private clients. In 1934, he donated his time, plants and materials to laying out the memorial garden and stone flagging at the War Memorial Hall—now the Country Women's Association Hall—at Leura.

Industrialist Cecil Hoskins, who also had a passion for gardens, became a client and lifelong friend. Sorensen designed and planted the garden of Hoskins' newly-built home, "Invergowrie", at Exeter (1936). "Invergowrie" was built on land Hoskins had bought from the estate of Arthur Yates in 1929. In making the new garden, Sorensen was able to make use of some mature trees, hedgerows, beds of daffodils, and orchards planted during Yates' ownership, but photographs taken at the time show the area in front of the house was newly-planted and almost all of the large garden was his work.

The association with Cecil Hoskins led to other garden projects, mainly in the Illawarra and Southern Highlands; "Gleniffer Brae", in Wollongong, for Cecil's brother Sidney Hoskins; "Green Hills" and "Hillside" executive housing for Australian Iron & Steel; and the Hoskins Memorial Church at Lithgow. He also created the gardens for "Redlands" at Mittagong.

Most of the gardens that Sorensen designed and built were for residences. Noteworthy exceptions were the rooftop garden that he created at Feltex House (an office building) or Henri van der Velde, in 1939, and three garden projects associated with the Hoskins family; the Mount Keira Scout Camp; the garden landscaped surroundings of the Southern Portland Cement Ltd's cement plant, near Berrima; and a Remembrance Drive of memorial tree plantings along the Old Hume Highway south of Berrima.

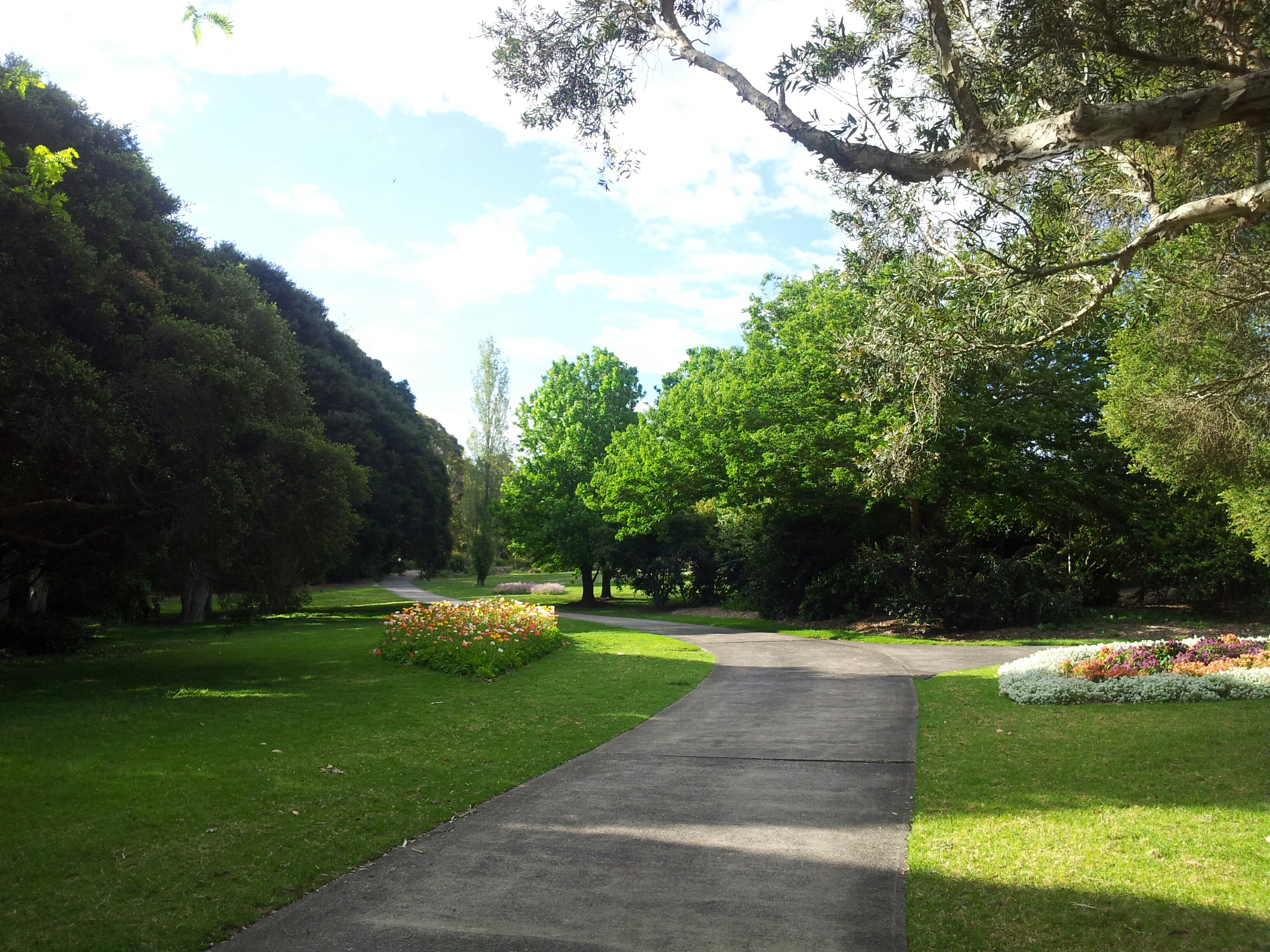
Surviving tree plantings at "Gleniffer Brae".

In 1939, by now doing significant work in the Southern Highlands and Illawarra areas, he set up a second nursery at Berrima, which operated until 1944. At "Mahratta" in Wahroonga, he redesigned and renovated his earlier garden to suit a new art deco style mansion built there for Thomas Alfred (T.A.) Field, a wealthy grazier and meat merchant, in 1941. Also in the 1940s, he created a cool climate garden for "The Braes" at Leura.

Sorensen became friendly with Lady Gowrie, wife of the Earl of Gowrie, Governor-General of Australia, and he assisted in the creation of a small garden at "Yarralumla" (Government House, Canberra), in memory of the Gowries' son, Patrick, who died on active service during the Second World War. Two of Sorensen's own sons died in the war and Cecil Hoskins invited Sorensen to erect a memorial to them in the grounds of the Hoskins Memorial Church at Lithgow; he created a simple memorial, using natural rock.

After the war, he constructed mainly smaller gardens, for country properties—including "Bethune" near Orange—and for houses in the Blue Mountains and on the Upper North Shore in Sydney.

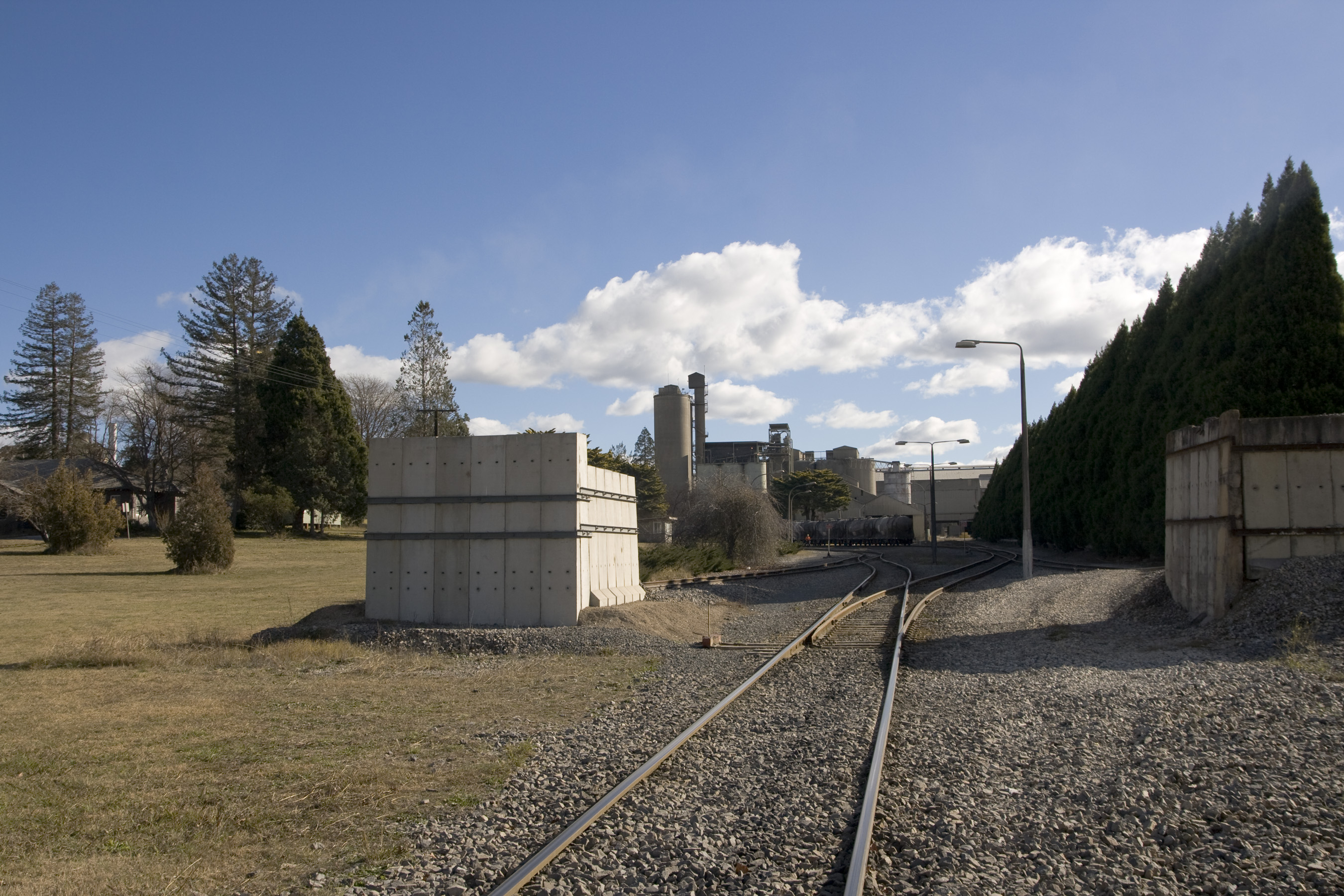
Cement plant at New Berrima, with park-like gardens designed and planted by Paul Sorensen (July 2010).

He returned to "Everglades"—from 1962 a National Trust of Australia (NSW) property—and expanded the garden. and to "Mahratta", where he renovated the garden for its new owners—Bank of New South Wales—in 1964.

He did work at the country estate of the Field family, Lanyon Homestead, in the A.C.T. Also in the A.C.T. he carried out tree surgery that saved some very old cedar trees at "Yarralumla". In the late 1960s, he also returned to "Invergowrie" and restored and extended the garden for its new owners. He also designed and constructed new gardens for "Mereworth House" at Berrima, in 1965, and "Fernhill" at Mulgoa in 1969. Such large commissions became rarer; the era of grand residences with extensive parkland gardens was largely over by the 1960s.

Sorensen kept working until his death in 1983, with his younger son and grandson doing the heavier work.

== Personal life and death ==
On 27 November 1919, Sorensen married Anna Ernestena Hillenberg. They had three sons, two of whom—Derrick and Neville—died during their service in the Second World War.

Sorensen died on 12 September 1983, at his home at Leura. He wanted his ashes returned to Europe and scattered in the North Sea.

His younger son, Ib Sorensen, was also a landscape gardener and carried on the business, finally selling the Sorensen's Nursery in 1988.

== Legacy ==
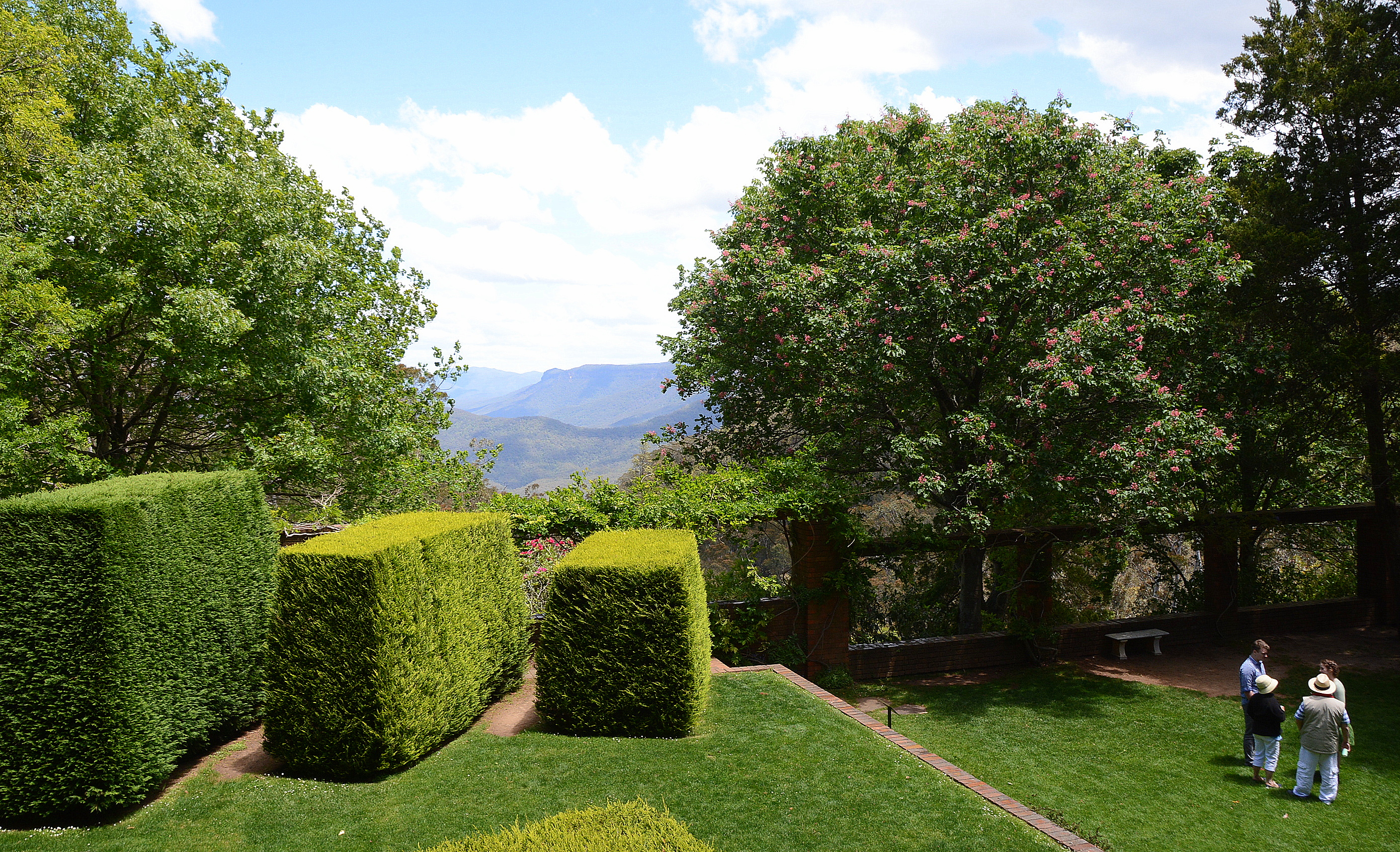
Part of garden of "Everglades", Leura.

Sorensen's main legacies are those of his gardens that survive to this day. He is best known for "Everglades" at Leura but he built over 100 gardens during his career. Unfortunately, some of his gardens have been lost, reduced in size, or neglected. Many of his remaining gardens are at risk from subdivision and other modern urban developments such as road widening. Sorensen's rooftop garden at Feltex House, Sydney, was lost when it was converted to office space in 1954; the original three-storey art deco style building was extended to nine storeys in 1961. A part of his garden "Gleniffer Brae" is now the Wollongong Botanic Garden, although changes made as a public park have masked much of the original garden's design. At "The Braes", the removal of large trees and other changes have altered the microclimate and compromised the aesthetics of the garden. "Invergowrie" retains a large garden by modern standards but due to some sub-division of the land is of reduced extent.

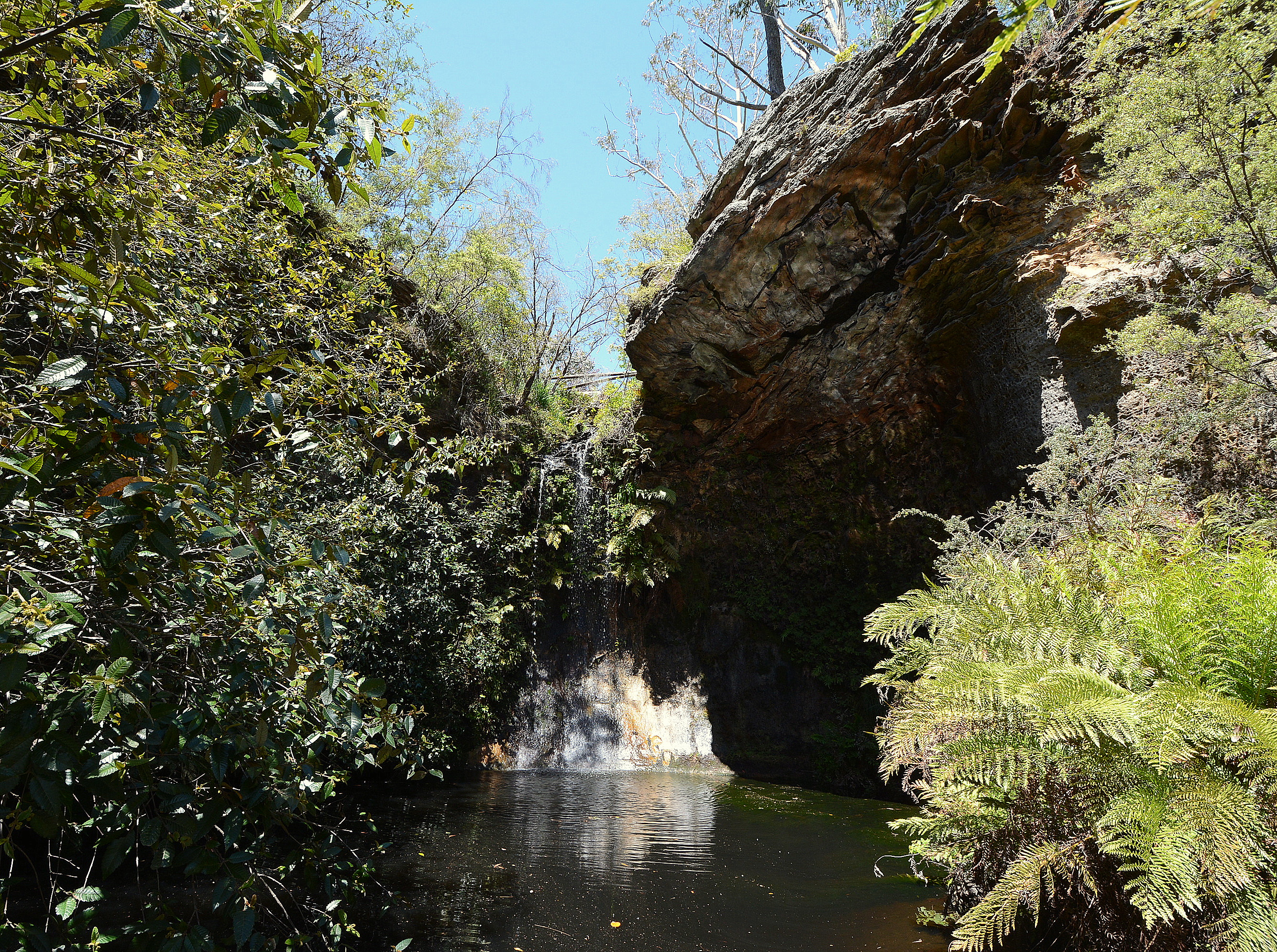
Naturalistic "grotto pool" at "Everglades".

A number of his surviving gardens are heritage listed. The garden of the Mount Keira Scout Camp is one of the best maintained surviving examples of his garden designs but is not heritage listed.

Sorensen's other legacies are his techniques for creating gardens and his approach to garden design, both of which were influential. He developed techniques for enhancing the sandy soils of the Blue Mountains, so that these soils could support luxuriant gardens. At "Gleniffer Brae", he transplanted, from the surrounding bushland, several large Illawarra flame trees—reputedly one of the earliest successful transplantings of mature Australian native trees, something still seen as very difficult to do.

Sorensen understood the difficulties of creating and maintaining large landscaped gardens in Australia, an extremely dry continent, saying that in Australia the approach should be "don't buy land, buy water".

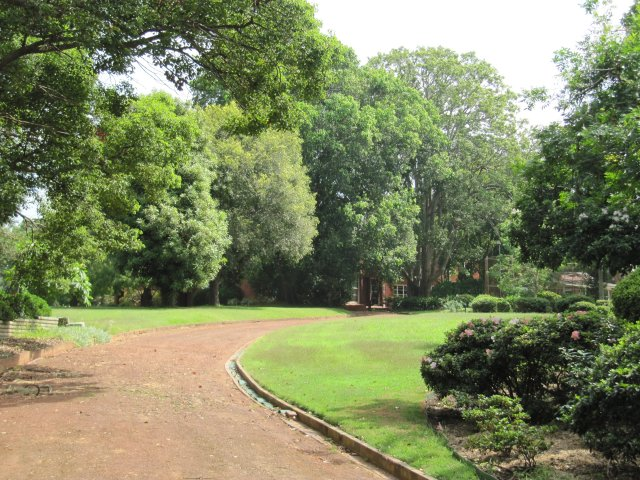
"Mahratta", Wahroonga - Driveway and part of the garden.

Sorensen's approach to landscape garden design, although based in the European tradition, was influenced by the Australian landscape. He saw the most important elements of gardens as being trees and larger shrubs. He used mainly exotic plants in his Australian gardens, but his terracing, stone walls, and other features were typically less formal and conventional than those of earlier garden designers. A signature feature was stone walling using local rock that may have been split or broken to shape but not noticeably cut with straight edges.

He made use of the surrounding outlooks and natural vegetation and he did use large native trees—such as the Illawarra flame trees and coastal cypress pine at "Gleniffer Brae"—when and where it suited his design. In the garden of "Mahratta", he mixed native trees with exotics. At "Everglades", he created a small waterfall and "grotto pool" of natural appearance—clearly influenced by the natural watercourses of the Blue Mountains—and the garden has a lookout overlooking Gordon Falls and the Jamison Valley Similarly, at "Leuralla", the garden overlooks the Jamison Valley. At "Gleniffer Brae", the garden framed views of nearby Mount Keira and at Mt Keira Scout Camp, he made advantage of distant views to the ocean. However, Sorensen planned his gardens so that plantings screened views and other features, which were gradually revealed only by moving through the garden space.

Although he planned a garden with its final landscape form in mind, Sorensen anticipated the development of the garden over a long period of time, during which its nature would vary as it matured; the aim was to allow the garden to achieve its own ecological equilibrium, after which only relatively little maintenance would be needed. This notion of planning for continuing change and development, over many years, was a novel and unusual approach, when Sorensen began his work.

== Heritage listings ==
Gardens by Sorensen are significant in the listing of these places in the New South Wales State Heritage Inventory:

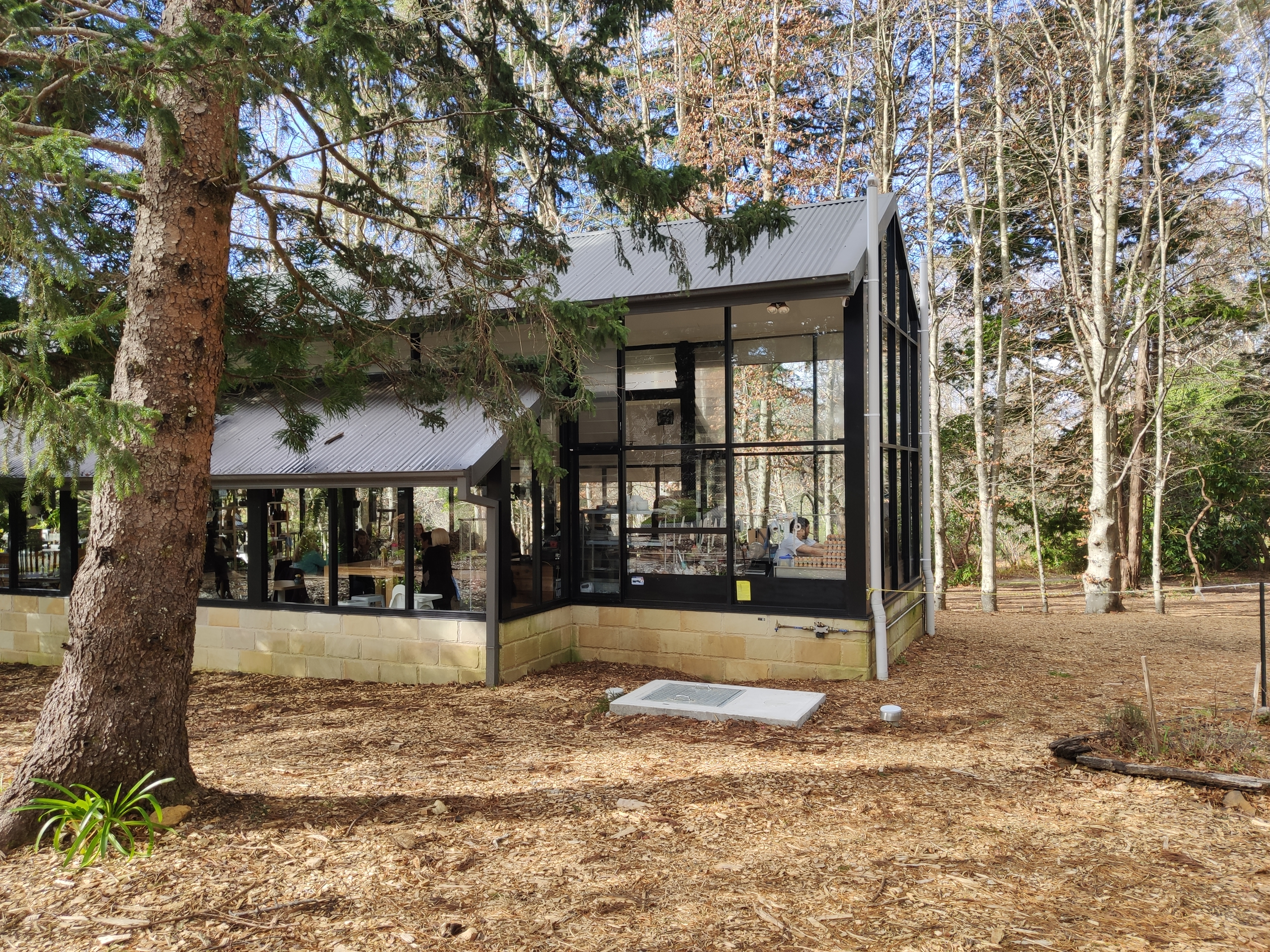
- Sorensen's glasshouse and nursery at Herbert Street, Leura after restoration (July 2022)
  "Everglades", 37-49 Everglades Avenue, Leura
- "Fernhill", 1041-1117 Mulgoa Road, Mulgoa
- "Gleniffer Brae", Murphys Avenue, Keiraville
- "Greenhills" and "Hillside", 170-190 Princes Highway, Figtree
- Hoskins Memorial Presbyterian Church, Bridge Street, Lithgow
- "La Vista", 65 Blaxland Road, Wentworth Falls
- "Leuralla", 43-49 Balmoral Road, Leura
- "Mahratta", 1526 Pacific Highway, Wahroonga
- "Mereworth House", 80 Mereworth Road, Berrima
- "Parklands", formerly "Karaweera", 132-174 Govetts Leap Road, Blackheath
- Sorensen's Nursery Site, 8-10 Herbert Street, Leura
- "Sunray", 2 Churchill Street, Leura
- "The Braes", 62-68 Grose Street, Leura

== Biographies and literature ==
Sorensen is the subject of Australia’s Master Gardener: Paul Sorensen and his gardens, by Richard Ratcliffe (1990).

He has an entry in the Australian Dictionary of Biography.

Sorensen left no written works of his own. His life and work are mentioned in various articles—particularly in Australian Garden History, the journal of the Australian Garden History Society—and books.

== See also ==
- Heritage gardens in Australia
