= Everglades, Leura =

Historic house in New South Wales, Australia

Everglades
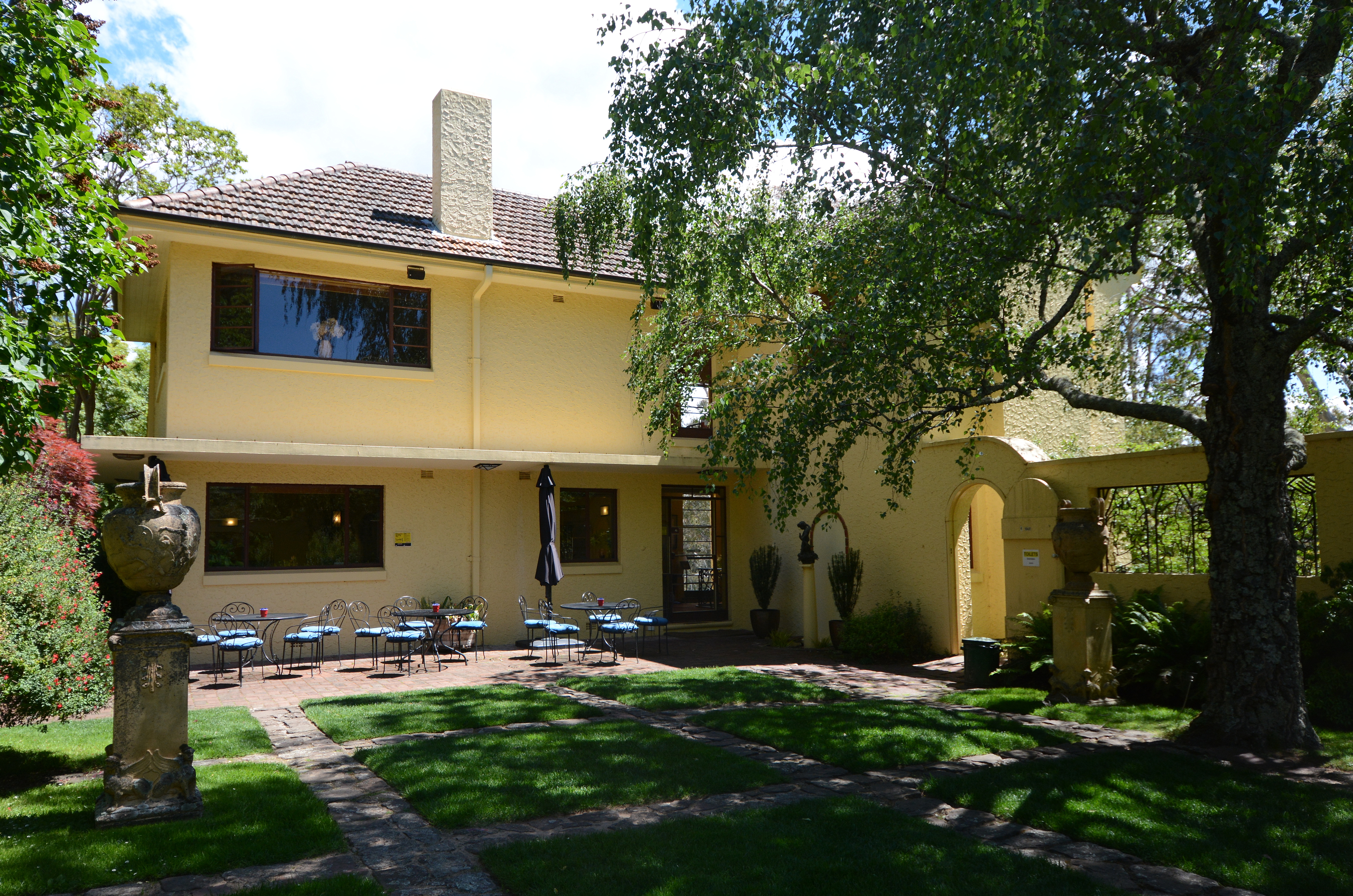
- Everglades, pictured in 2016

- Location within New South Wales Location within Australia
- 33°43′20″S 150°20′14″E
- Location: 37 - 49 Everglades Avenue, Leura, City of Blue Mountains, New South Wales, Australia

History
- Built: 1915–1938

Site notes
- Elevation: 940 metres (3,080 ft)
- Area: 5.2 hectares (13 acres)
- Architects: Paul Sorensen (in collaboration with Henri van de Velde?) (garden); Paul Sorensen (house attributed)
- Owner: National Trust of Australia (NSW)

New South Wales Heritage Register
- Official name: Everglades; Everglades Gardens
- Type: State heritage (landscape)
- Designated: 1 March 2002
- Reference no.: 1498
- Type: Garden Residential
- Category: Parks, Gardens and Trees
- Builders: Ted Cohen

Everglades is a heritage-listed former residence, art gallery, cafe and garden, house museum and now tourist destination at 37 - 49 Everglades Avenue, Leura, City of Blue Mountains, New South Wales, Australia. The garden was designed by Paul Sorensen (possibly in collaboration with Henri van de Velde) and the design of the house is also attributed to Paul Sorensen; and built from 1915 to 1938 by Ted Cohen. It is also known as Everglades Gardens. The property is owned by the National Trust of Australia (NSW). It was added to the New South Wales State Heritage Register on 1 March 2002.

== History ==
=== Colonial history ===
Until 1813 the Blue Mountains had proved a restriction to the expansion of settlement in Australia. In that year Blaxland, Wentworth and Lawson made the first successful crossing and opened the vast interior of the country to settlement. The construction of a road soon followed and in 1863 a railway was built as far as Penrith and extended as far as Mount Victoria by 1868. By the 1870s it had become fashionable for elite families to acquire mountain retreats with magnificent views where in summer the air was considerably cooler than Sydney. Villages such as Leura developed to serve these retreats which over time developed large European gardens.

The Everglades had borne that name for at least a decade before 1933 (when Henry van de Velde acquired it) and had formed part of a more extensive estate in Leura for over half a century, ever since Captain Reynolds took out a series of conditional leases of Crown land in 1880 and 1881. Reynolds' acquisitions included portion 91, where Everglades is situated.

The face of modern south-east Leura was shaped by the activities of Reynolds and his successors. Intensive subdivision of Reynolds' estate by Ernest Nardin, continued by his widow Ellen, created both residential and recreational possibilities. More people bought and built in south-east Leura and the golf course which plays an important role in Everglades' story was created on Nardin land.

This in turn was the context which tempted Georgina Stonier to move to the heartland of the present Everglades, which the percipient Nardins had retained for themselves. Mrs Stonier's shrewd appraisal of the landscape led her to build her large home in 1915-16 in that part of the estate where the van de Veldes erected their house 20 years later and enjoying similar spectacular views to the south. The Everglades was, moreover, given its name by Georgina Stonier and it was she who first manipulated its environment, cleared some of the bush, planted exotics and fruit trees, creating terraces and a driveway supported by low stone walls.

Henry and Una van de Velde did not acquire an empty canvas in 1933. The decisions which created the present house and garden were in debt to Captain Reynolds, Ernest and Ellen Nardin and Georgina Stonier. Nor were these decisions of the 1930s made unaided by van de Velde and Paul Sorensen. The van de Velde connections within the Sydney suburb of Manly and at Leura and the significance of Una van de Velde and her Maitland sisters are important antidotes to the simplistic and rather triumphalist story which centres around the two major male figures.

Henry van de Velde, born in Belgium in 1875, was a wealthy man of business ability with boundless energy and wide interests. His main business activity was as owner of Australian felt and Textiles, manufacturers of among other things Feltex Floor covering.

=== Development of Everglades estate ===
As a regular visitor to the mountains he decided in 1932 to purchase Everglades which previously had been an orchard destroyed by a bushfire in 1910. Almost immediately he began discussions with Paul Sorensen regarding the garden he proposed to build. The work was eventually to be extended to include the design of the house as well as the garden. Van de Velde spent every weekend tirelessly working in the gardens, frequently extracting labor from his many guests. Sorensen estimated that Van de Velde spent thousands on the development of the Everglades and considered him to be the greatest patron of landscaping gardening that Australia ever had.

Paul Sorensen (1890-1983) commenced landscape training in Copenhagen in 1902 with the final two years of his training under the direction of Lars Nielsen, a leading Danish Horticulturist responsible for the design of much of the open space system of Copenhagen. This period included maintenance work at Villa Hvdore, the summer place of Queen Alexandra of Denmark.

In 1914 Sorensen decided to emigrate and left for Australia. He managed to gain a position as gardener at the Carrington Hotel, Katoomba and began remodeling the garden there before (by 1917) setting up his own nursery and garden design business in the Blue Mountains.

In 1933 Sorensen met Henri van de Velde through a client R. J. Wilson of "Dean Park". Wilson encouraged van de Velde to buy the Everglades property and engage Sorensen for the design of the garden. At Everglades he paid homage to the magnificent views of the Jamison Valley below and to the Blue Mountains beyond. The Terraces he constructed were accordingly aligned with the natural slope and to take advantage of the views in a way, which did not allow the scale of the scene to overwhelm the garden. He held that the form of the garden was more important than colour and considered that Australian gardens generally were only interested in colour with the result that the form was often neglected. Also unusual for the time was his retention of native species such as banksias and eucalyptus within the garden. As few nurserymen were at that time propagating native species, he tended to draw upon the palette of exotic species with which he had become familiar in Europe, many of them he supplied from his own nursery or imported from around the world for the particular project.

Trees and shrubs were always seen by Sorensen as the most important elements of a garden and were always placed to create a feeling of mystery as to what was behind them, as well as giving the usual feeling of enclosure and shelter. The idea of development over time is a commonly recurring theme in many of his gardens and displayed a profound awareness of the ecological impossibility of fixing the character of a landscape permanently in every detail. The aim was to create a final landscape, which, although having different qualities of beauty at different times in its development period, would achieve a state of ecological balance in which its continuing maintenance would be relatively minimal. This planned continuity of change and development over many years was quite revolutionary when Sorensen began his work and even today is not always accepted.

There is little visible evidence of the immense physical difficulties encountered in building the garden. Construction took place before the days of heavy earth moving equipment and consequently all earthworks and the movement of the heavy stone were carried out by manpower alone. Fortunately for Everglades, the Depression was at its height and manpower was readily available albeit unskilled.

Sorensen saw the first task as deciding on the qualities of the site most desirable for retention. Existing trees were marked to be kept, only misshapen or damaged ones were to be removed. Sorensen must have been keenly aware of the opportunities to exploit the dramatic outlook over the Jamison Valley from the lower part of the site. The view of distant cliffs and valley floor carpeted with dense eucalpyt forest, all softened by the gentle atmospheric blueness so characteristic of the mountains, was one to stir the imagination of all but the most unromantic. Sorensen's decision not to use this view as part of the formal garden but to limit intensive development to the area previously disturbed for the orchard was made very early in the design stage.

The fact that this view could not be obtained from any of the formal terraces must have seem strange to many people, but this decision was in line with Sorensen's belief that it was wrong to be able to perceive the total of his design from any point and that element of surprise that would come from arrival at his lookout points would add an incredible quality of delight to the garden. He also realised that the grandeur of the scene was such that it would be out of scale with anything he could construct and that it was possible that any attempt to make this view a dominant feature in the formal part of the garden would detract from both the view and the garden.

Apart from the problems of the slope, the other major difficulty encountered was the thinness and rocky nature of the soil. The very factors that made the Blue Mountains such a desirable destination for the holiday maker- the spectacular cliffs and the rugged grandeur of the scenery- created immense problems for the garden builder. The whole area was formed from sandstone, which belongs to the Narabeen group of Triassic sandstones. Much of the stones character comes from its richness in iron oxide which gives it its rich, dark red or purple coloured narrow bands and layers which, over eons have been warped by geological movement. The iron oxide makes the layers containing it much harder than the surrounding stone so that with erosion of the softer stone the so-called ironstone is exposed on cliff faces in quite incredible forms ranging from flat stones through curves to tubes. The soils formed from this parent material are very sandy, lacking in nutrients and full of the harder ironstone fragments.

Sorensen turned this physical character of the soil into an advantage by hand-digging the whole of the cultivated area to the depth of 600–900 millimetres (24–35 in) and removing all ironstone found in the process, stockpiling it according to quality and colour and eventually for packing and filling. The walls formed from this stone exhibit an extremely high quality of workmanship. In many places Sorensen left pockets in the walls where he could plant small growing shrubs to soften the walls. The walls formed terraces filled level with soil, stepping down the slope to the lookout point, with the garden continuing down to the Grotto pool, created by the placing of a 40-ton rock in its present position.

Sorensen was retained to carry out maintenance work on the gardens even when development work was not in hand. Work on the garden continued with an interruption due to the War until 1947 when Van de Velde died.

Following Van de Velde's death the property was purchased firstly by Mr E. E. Bristow who sold to Mr Harry Pike, a grazier who in turn sold to Swain & Co. Pty Ltd, whose then principal Mr A. N. Swain was a garden lover.

After acquiring Swain & Co, Angus and Robertson, Booksellers and publishers attempted to dispose of the property, advertising in Britain and Europe, in an attempt to attract a purchaser with sufficient means to maintain the garden. That attempt failed and it was again offered for auction in Australia, but was again passed in. The National Trust purchased the property in 1962. During this period of private ownership there was a gradual deterioration of the garden resulting from the lack of an enthusiastic owner/occupier and the loss of Paul Sorensen's services. Everglades was one of the Trust's earliest acquired properties and the first with a garden. Members were invited to visit from 1962. From 1962-70 the Trust managed it directly, a period marked by unsuccessful attempts to exploit the place and uneven decline. In 1963 the Trust requested the NSW Government resume undeveloped lots to the south of Everglades. Approval was given in 1964. The Trust was appointed trustee in 1964.

=== Management under the National Trust of Australia ===
Until 1981 the Trust endeavoured by various attempts to make the property a financial asset. The squash court became part of the renamed Studio Terrace and exhibitions were held there as well as in the house. Sorensen was re-employed in 1974-5 for creation of the new azalea garden, but the property went into increasing debt. Attempts to find suitable tenants were unsuccessful, as were attempts to have the Government take it over. From 1981-87 Blue Mountains City Council leased the property, re-employing Sorensen to replant and thin out other areas. Council established a creative arts centre here in 1982 and visitation increased.

In 1983 after almost 50 years in the garden, a bronze statue "Boy with a thorn in his foot" was stolen. At the same time, another Everglades sculpture of Pan went missing and the Trust has as yet been unable to locate it or find a replacement.

Between 1987-98 it was leased to Albech a development company. Mawland Holdings took over Albech's interest, increased maintenance of the garden and proposed development of a 20-room guesthouse on lot 8. This failed to occur and in 1998 the property returned to direct control of the National Trust. In 2007 a comprehensive tree survey was undertaken. In 2008 access and safety issues were reassessed and above-ground water tanks were installed.

On 28 July 2012, a function was held to celebrate the (re-)installation of an authenticated copy of a bronze stateue called "Boy with a thorn in his foot". This restored the bronze to its place under the Japanese maple (Acer palmatum) in the courtyard where it had been since the 1930s. In 2011 the National Trust started a campaign to raise funds so a new "Boy" could be cast to replace the artwork. Then news came that an exact replica was about to be auctioned in Melbourne. Fortuitously the sum of donations enabled the Trust to bid on it and gain it. The "Boy" or "Il Spinario" is a bronze cast from a 1st-century BC statue now in the Palazzo dei Conservatori in Rome. The original was given to the city of Rome by Pope Sixtus IV in the 12th century and stood for centuries outside the Lateran Palace. It was taken in the Napoleonic Wars, and triumphantly paraded into Paris. In 1816 it was repatriated to Rome. In the late 19th century, a number of foundries in Naples were licensed to produce casts of ancient statues. One of these was the Fonderia G. Sommer, Napoli, the maker of our new " Boy". It's possible that the stolen boy may have come from the same foundry.

Theatre performances have again been held in the garden theatre for some years. The annual January Leura Shakespeare Festival 2015 sold out for all evening performances at Everglades. The Leura Garden Festival was the biggest revenue-raiser, bringing around 5000 visitors over a nine-day period. A continuous program of art exhibitions runs from September to May each year and grows in popularity. The Norman Lindsay Gallery, Everglades and Woodford Academy were all represented in the Blue Mountains Winter Magic street festival which attracted over 30,000 people.

== Description ==
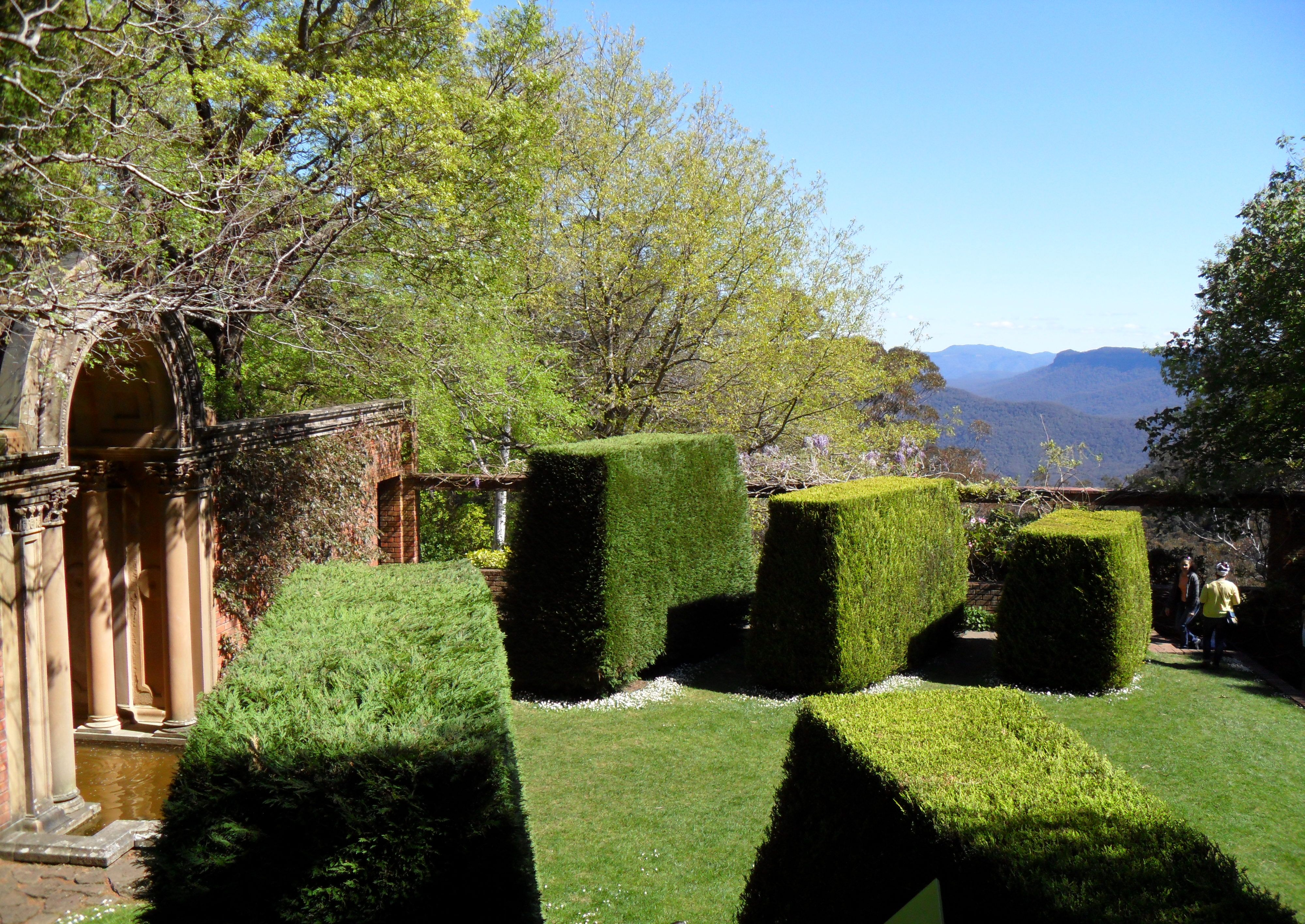
Everglades garden, pictured in 2012.

=== Garden ===
Everglades is separated from Everglades Avenue (formerly Denison Street) by a low stone wall, the house not being visible from the street. The driveway entrance is located at the highest point of the site and was at first something of a problem, owing to the steep fall of the land. Sorensen overcame the difficulty by routing it along the upper level of the land for much of the width of the site before leading it in a series of sweeping curves down through the garden, passing firstly through areas of open lawn and flower beds and then past enormous banks of rhododendrons before sweeping around the rear of the house to end at the garages which are situated beneath it. To the left of the upper drive huge rocks rise from the soil to form the structure of an alpine garden whilst to the right, beyond the formal lawn and annual beds, stone walls drop the levels down the slope in a series of unseen terraces only hinted at by the tops of mature trees appearing over the walls.

Everglades contains many species of trees rare to the Blue Mountains at the time for, in his search of perfection; Sorensen was to seek plants from a large number of nurseries. Many of the plants were imported specifically for Everglades, some trees as far afield as Holland but many more from Duncan and Davies nursery in New Zealand. Other plants came from Victoria, in particular from Nobelius Nursery and Remington's Nursery.

From the studio viewpoint the garden theatre cannot be seen and it is not until the southern end of the terrace is approached that its presence is revealed. The backdrop to this theatre is framed by the reconstructed red sandstone entrance porch from the London Chartered Bank of Australia building, designed and built by Architect J.F.Hilley in George Street Sydney in 1866 and demolished in 1938 to make way for Feltex House, the new headquarters of Henri's business activities. Carefully taken down, transported to Leura and re-erected as the backdrop to the garden theatre, the archway of the entrance porch was flanked with tall Bhutan cypress (Cupressus torulosa) hedges, clipped formally to form the wings of the storage area. Another major terrace approximates the ground floor level of the house. A grass and stone paved courtyard formed by the angle of the house and matching stuccoed walls is linked to this terrace via an arched opening which gives focus to a large stone urn at the far or northern end of the terrace. Other openings are in this enclosing wall is filled with free form art deco wrought iron grilles also designed by Sorensen. The court was designed as the home for several pieces of classical sculpture, collected by Van de Velde on his travels around the world to add unexpected interest to the garden. Unfortunately these have been stolen or broken in recent years.

On leaving the court via the archway, a stone flagged area is crossed leading to a broad flight of shallow steps descending to the level of the terrace proper, which comprises a large smooth lawn lined with weeping Japanese flowering cherry trees. Originally the canopy of the cherries was supported on a pergola which continued at least until the 1960s. These trees have been replaced.

A further terrace is reached at the level of the lower drive before the formal terraces and exotic plantings merge with the natural bushland.

Pathways become more informal as they lead down to the lookout, which gives extensive views over the valley of the Gordon Falls and out in the Jamison Valley. From this point one path leads down past a fern-covered cliff face rich in ironstone to end at the Grotto Pool, which fits so perfectly into its setting that is difficult to believe that it is not a natural feature retained in the garden by Sorensen. The pool is fed by a waterfall, which tumbles over the cliff, its watercourse having traversed the full southern side of the property. The other path from the lookout leads through bushland to a simple timber bridge, which spans the watercourse immediately above the falls and provides another view of the Grotto pool.

As the path is followed from the bridge the character of the garden changes once more to the gentle slopes, well grassed and dominated by stands of deciduous trees such as maples, poplars and birch before the patterns back to itself to climb a hill through drifts of rhododendron and azaleas back to the driveway.

=== House ===
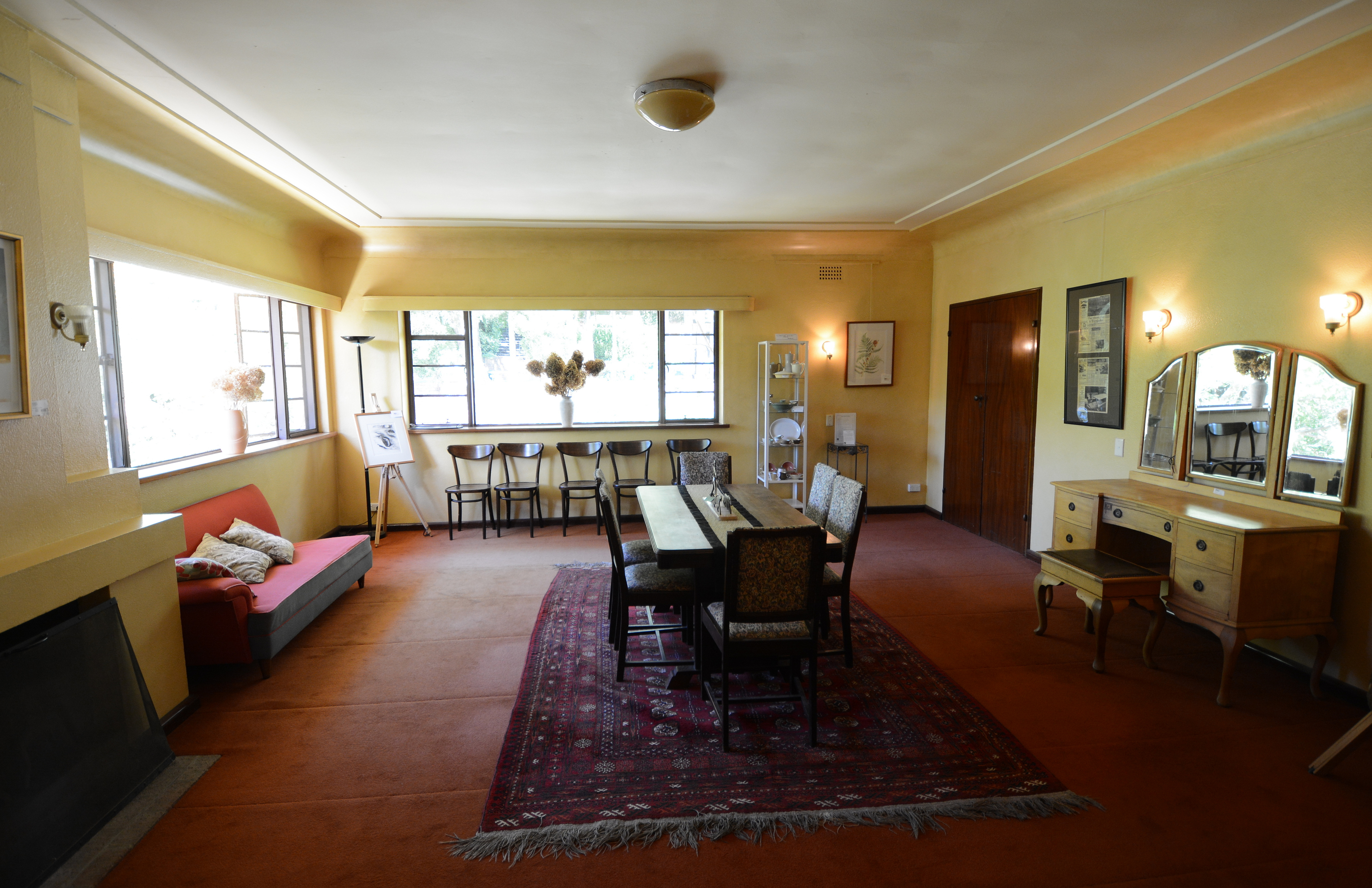
An image of the interior, pictured in 2016.

The house is of masonry construction, built on three floors incorporating a basement, ground and first floors. It sits on a site sloping quite steeply to the southwest, allowing only half the general floor area in the basement, while part of the first floor is attic space. The roof is terra cotta tile and the walls are cavity brick finished in a Mediterranean style stucco; windows are steel framed except for those enclosing Bedroom G.3

The exterior of the house has been painted and rainwater gutters and downpipes replaced. Walls have been painted in a colour similar to biscuit, rainwater goods similar to Venetian red, and windows have been painted black. The roof tiles are muntz, but are heavily covered with lichen. Floors are a combination of concrete and timber originally covered with either pale green (ground floor) or mauve (first floor) carpet. Internal walls are plastered, with a flat finish in utilitarian rooms and a textured finish in the others. Ceilings are plastered or rendered and exhibit a hierarchy of embellishment of the plaster cornices, from nothing or a small cove in halls and bathrooms to elaborate Art Deco treatment in the living and bedrooms.

Most rooms retain the carpet, which is in relatively good condition. Where this has been removed the boards have been painted with a gloss finish jade green paint. The bathrooms are highly intact and are a particular feature of the house with their generous layout and unusual decor. Other significant details of the exterior and interiors of the building have been noted in tables Appendix 2-Exterior Fabric Survey and Appendix 3 Interior Fabric Survey. (.Murphy, 1998)

=== Studio ===
Located near the front gate, in an elevated position hard against the northern boundary and opening onto the swimming pool terrace this building is clearly linked to the European Modern Movement with echoes of the Bauhaus and Le Corbusier. Casneaux photographs indicate that it was furnished with fine imported furniture.

External character: A fine example of the 30s modern style, with endered waves banding the building and roof lights illuminating the squash court. The space occupied by the squash court originally was windowless, presenting a plain uninterrupted face to the garden. The windows later cut through the walls is unsympathetic to the building and its era, in particular the upper window, which breaks the ornate, wave banding. The inlaid timber floor survives intact. Originally the building was elegant, simple and functional with the squash court on the ground floor, overlooked by an upper level gymnasium. A small washroom facility served squash court, gym and swimming pool.

=== Structure ===
Presumed to be reinforced concrete, rendered brick work, timber frame. A reinforced concrete cantilever supports the Gym and provides a structural feature of period interest.

=== Log cabin ===
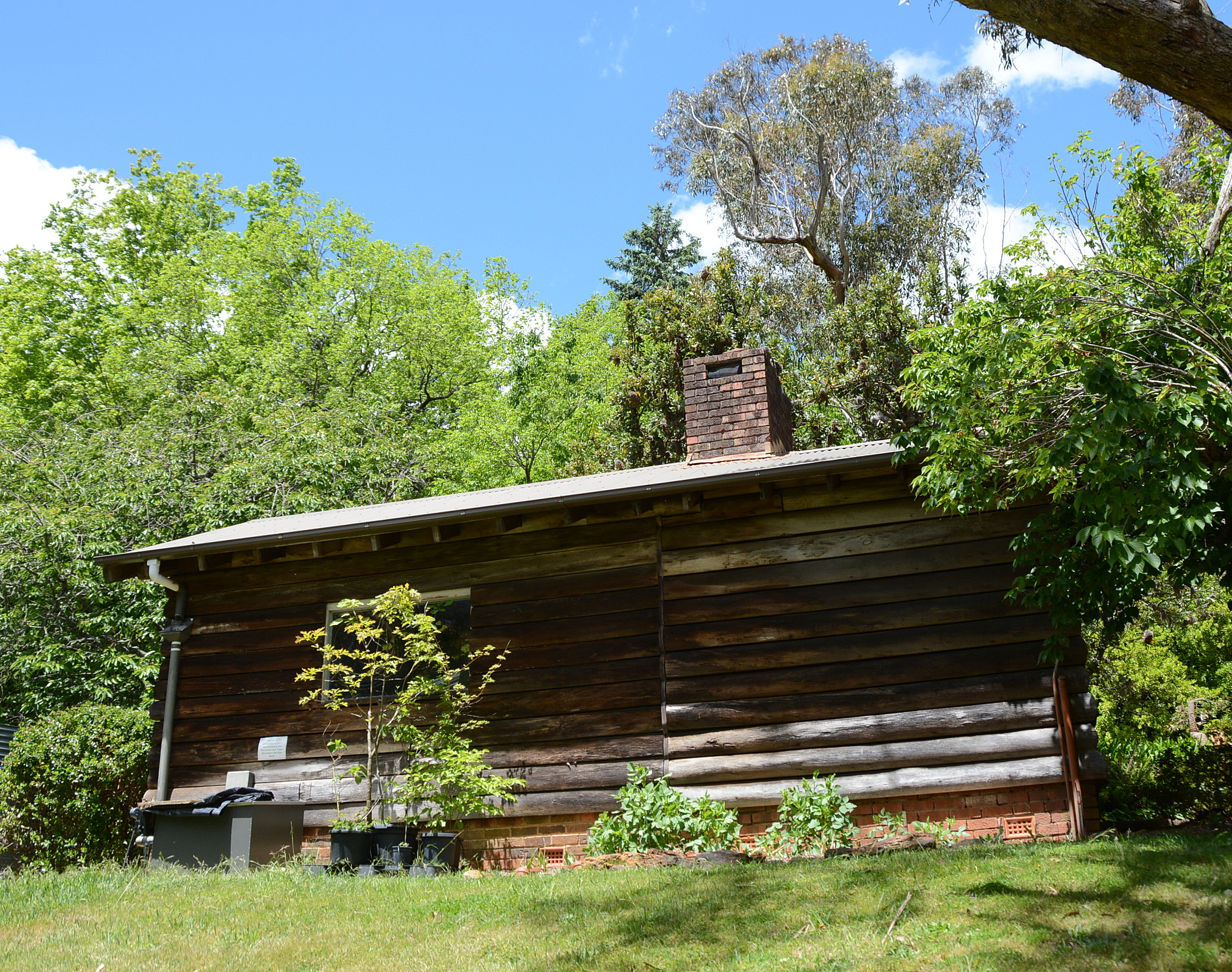
The log cabin, pictured in 2016.

This is a typical rustic structure common in large gardens throughout history. It is constructed with a standard timber frame overlaid with elaborately hewn planks. It consists of two rooms with a central chimney structure housing fireplace and stove. Its condition is sound. A plan of this building taken from the previous conservation plan by Knox and Tanner is at figure 4. Brick Shelter: This small building, constructed of brick with a clay shingle roof appears in very early photographs of the garden. Its exact purpose has not been determined but it is a finely detailed structure, which adds to the character of the garden. Its condition is sound and it is presently being used as an information centre for the garden.

National Trust Magazine NSW November 2008-January 2009: completion of much needed work at Everglades funded by a $100,000 grant reinstatement of the traditional internal paint scheme, upgrading of pathways and the production of new interpretative material.

=== Condition ===
As at 23 December 2008, the physical condition is good.

While the garden was neglected approximately 1947 (Van der Velde's death) until 1962 when bought by the National Trust, and subject to varying degrees of maintenance during that period and since, it retains its overall layout, major design features such as driveways, paths, terrace walls and steps, major built structures, and major plantings.

Funding and standards of maintenance have never equalled those pre-1947, however the National Trust has reversed this trend in recent years, implementing a program of staged garden and structural repair works, to conserve, repair and reinstate important features.

Due to the dynamic nature of gardens, and changing levels of shade and moisture under maturing tree cover, ground level plantings have changed since the initial design. Further tree and shrub pruning work is required in terms of removing risks to visitors and structures, removing dead wood, and reinstating views of significance.

A lack of funds has to date not enabled the Trust to repair the pump on the grotto pool, although this is proposed.

Further research work is required to clarify the roles and contribution made to the place by Henri van der Velde and Paul Sorenson, to identify the changes made to the garden post 1947 (cf those made pre-1947), and clarify the relative significance of each, to prioritise conservation and other works required to the garden. This work is currently underway.

=== Modifications and dates ===
Everglades was acquired by the National Trust in 1962 and immediately began a two-year restoration program under the supervision of Paul Sorensen.

- Studio Terrace and Vista c. 1939 - Note conifer hedge between terrace and house (now overgrown)
- The Garden Theatre 1989 - Note conifer " wings" becoming overgrown
- 1994 - Everglades House additions and cracking
- 1994 - Path problems
- 1994 - Unsympathetic Concrete paving to house entry
- 2008 - reinstated traditional internal paint scheme; upgraded paths. Secured federal funding to allow installation of water tank.
- November 2008-January 2009 - National Trust Magazine (NSW): Funding was successfully sought from the Commonwealth Government, and from donors, to allow for the installation of a water tank, with work to be completed in the 2008-2009 year.
- May 2013: bronze statue "Boy with a thorn in his foot" - an authenticated copy reinstated in the garden (original copy was stolen in 1983 after some 50 years in the garden.

== Heritage listing ==
As at 3 March 2010, Everglades was significant as a largely intact modernist garden, as an important development in garden design in Australia and as reputedly the most important garden of Paul Sorensen, a notable garden designer, in collaboration with Henri van de Velde the owner. It has significance due to its unusually rich collection of exotic flora. It also has associations with Henri van de Velde, an important businessman of the immediate pre-World War II years. It has significance as an example of a mountain retreat illustrating the way of life of its period. It has significance due to the aesthetic regard held for the garden in the local community. It has significance through the technical excellence of its construction, particularly the stonewalling, and through its design quality. The house has significance as one of only a few buildings attributed to Paul Sorensen. It also has significance for the technical and design quality of its interiors. The studio has significance as an important element in the garden and as an early Australian example of the influence of the European Modern Architecture Movement.

Everglades was listed on the New South Wales State Heritage Register on 1 March 2002 having satisfied the following criteria.

The place is important in demonstrating the course, or pattern, of cultural or natural history in New South Wales.

Everglades is of historic value as an largely intact modernist garden, reputedly an example of the earlier work of Paul Sorensen, one of the most accomplished landscape/garden designers in Australia in the period 1920-1970, in collaboration with Henri ven de Velde the owner. It also has associations with Henri van de Velde, an important businessman of the immediate pre-war years. It has significance as an example of a mountain retreat illustrating the way of life of its period.

The place has a strong or special association with a person, or group of persons, of importance of cultural or natural history of New South Wales's history.

Everglades has associations with Henri van der Velde, an important businessman of the immediate pre-war years, and Paul Sorenson, notable garden designer and contractor active mainly in NSW.

The place is important in demonstrating aesthetic characteristics and/or a high degree of creative or technical achievement in New South Wales.

The setting is mainly natural with surrounding exotic trees evident to the north of the garden. The garden is structured to provide a diverse range of spaces with the unifying theme of the ironstone walls. Near the house the spaces are structured into a series of formal terraces with statuary and other ornaments, while areas of the garden that adjoin the bushland have a more natural feel. The unusual richness and design of its landscape features such as the use of local ironstone for retaining walls, the incorporation of natural rock formations and indigenous trees, the planting schemes, the use of ornaments such as vases, urns, statues and fountains, and the borrowing of natural scenery all give it major aesthetic significance. So too does the architectural design and interation of the residence, studio, garden theatre, water features and decorative iron grilles.

The place has a strong or special association with a particular community or cultural group in New South Wales for social, cultural or spiritual reasons.

Everglades has social value for its possible role in initiating what has become the Leura Gardens Festival, and in influencing the development of high- quality cool-climate gardens in the upper Blue Mountains.

It also has social value for its status as a much opened and visited private garden, known to the public and visited since publicity and occasional open days in the 1930s, and particularly since the 1960s when the National Trust took over the property and opened it to the public full-time.

The place has potential to yield information that will contribute to an understanding of the cultural or natural history of New South Wales.

Everglades presents the potential to yield information about the transmission, implementation and dispersal of ideas of the modern movement in relation to both house and garden design, as practised in Europe in the early twentieth century, into Australia.

It also presents the potential to yield information on the range of skills and relative contribution of Henri van der Velde, Paul Sorensen and others to a complex, layered place, designed and constructed to high standards of quality, and subject to varying degrees of maintenance and neglect over time.

The place possesses uncommon, rare or endangered aspects of the cultural or natural history of New South Wales.

The house has significance as one of only few buildings attributed to have been designed by Paul Sorensen. It has significance also for the technical design quality of its interiors.

The garden has the significance as a rare, large, elaborate and relatively intact modernist garden design in New South Wales, reflecting European art and developments of the period.

The place is important in demonstrating the principal characteristics of a class of cultural or natural places/environments in New South Wales.

Everglades is representative of a mountain retreat of high design quality illustrating the way of life of its period.

It is also representative of a large and elaborate modernist garden design, with building structures of a functionalist style.

== Gallery ==
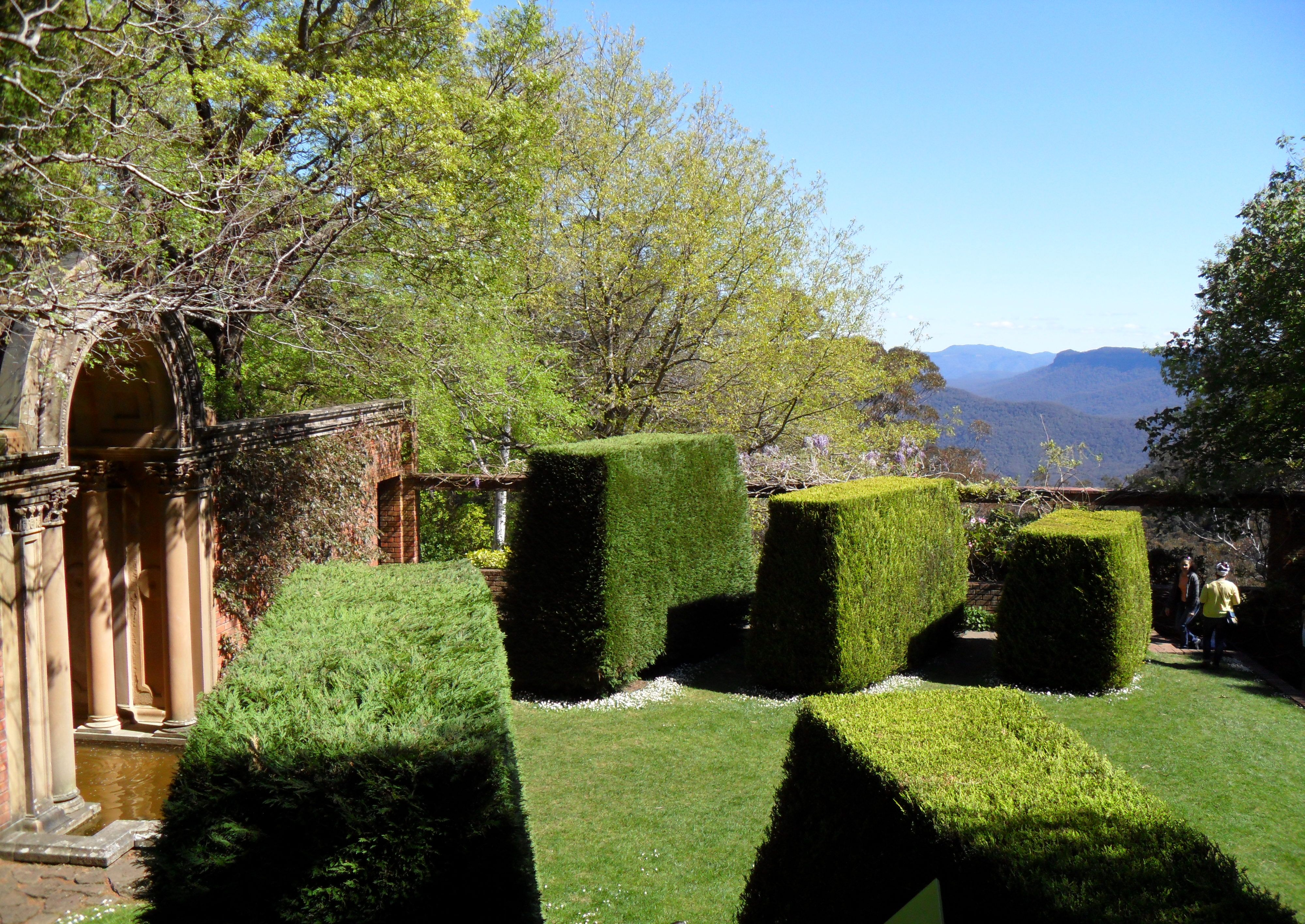

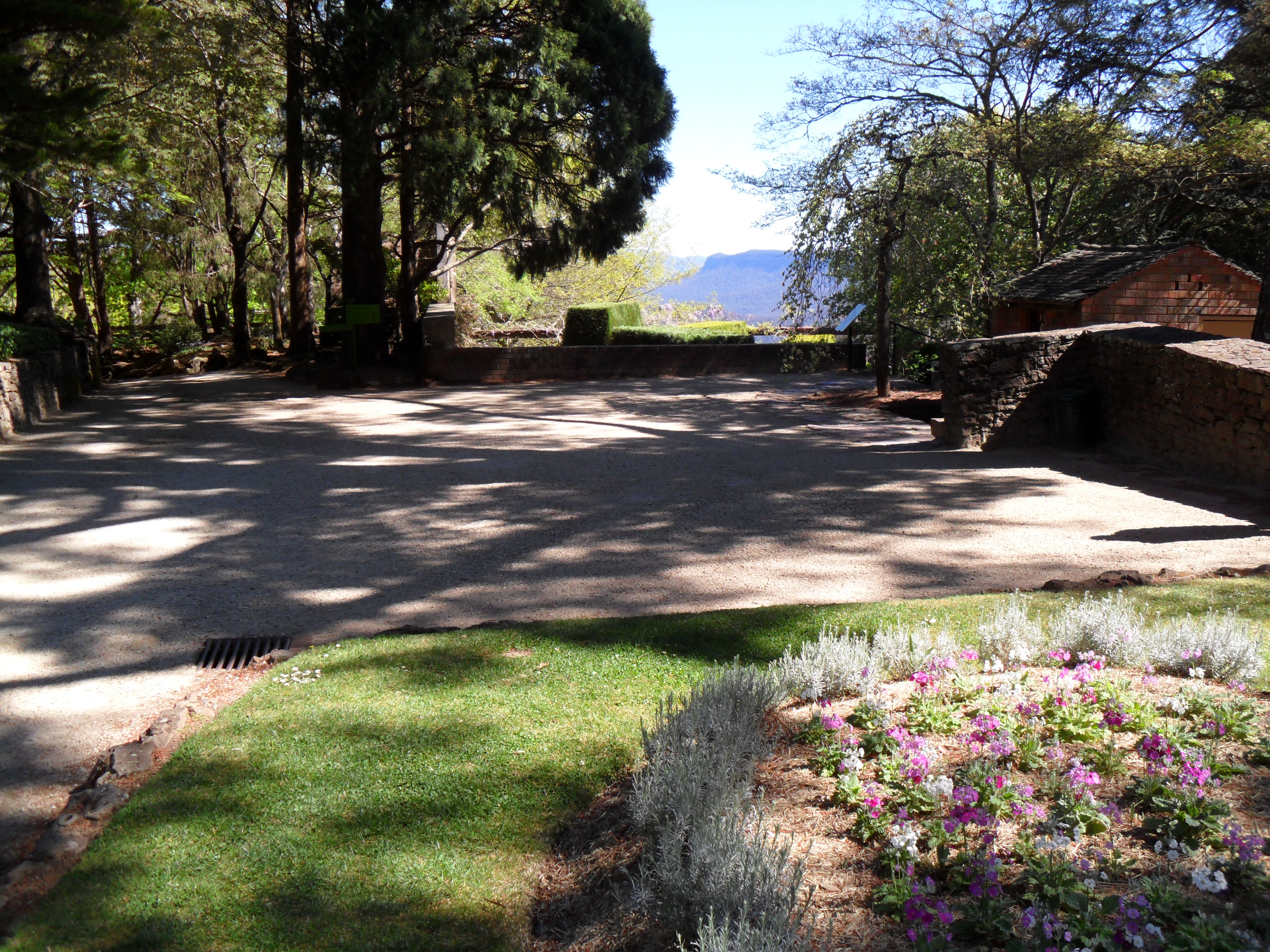

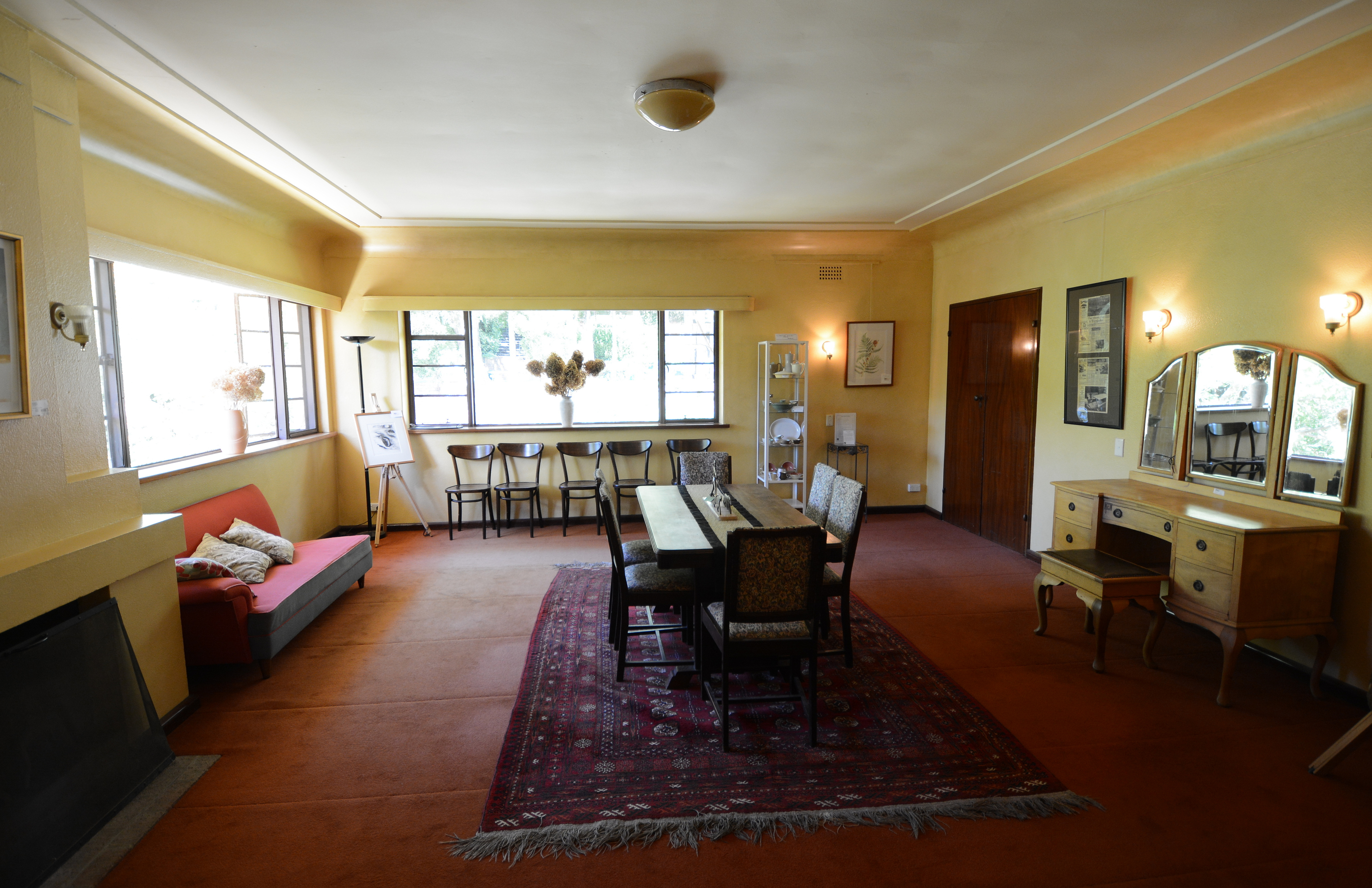

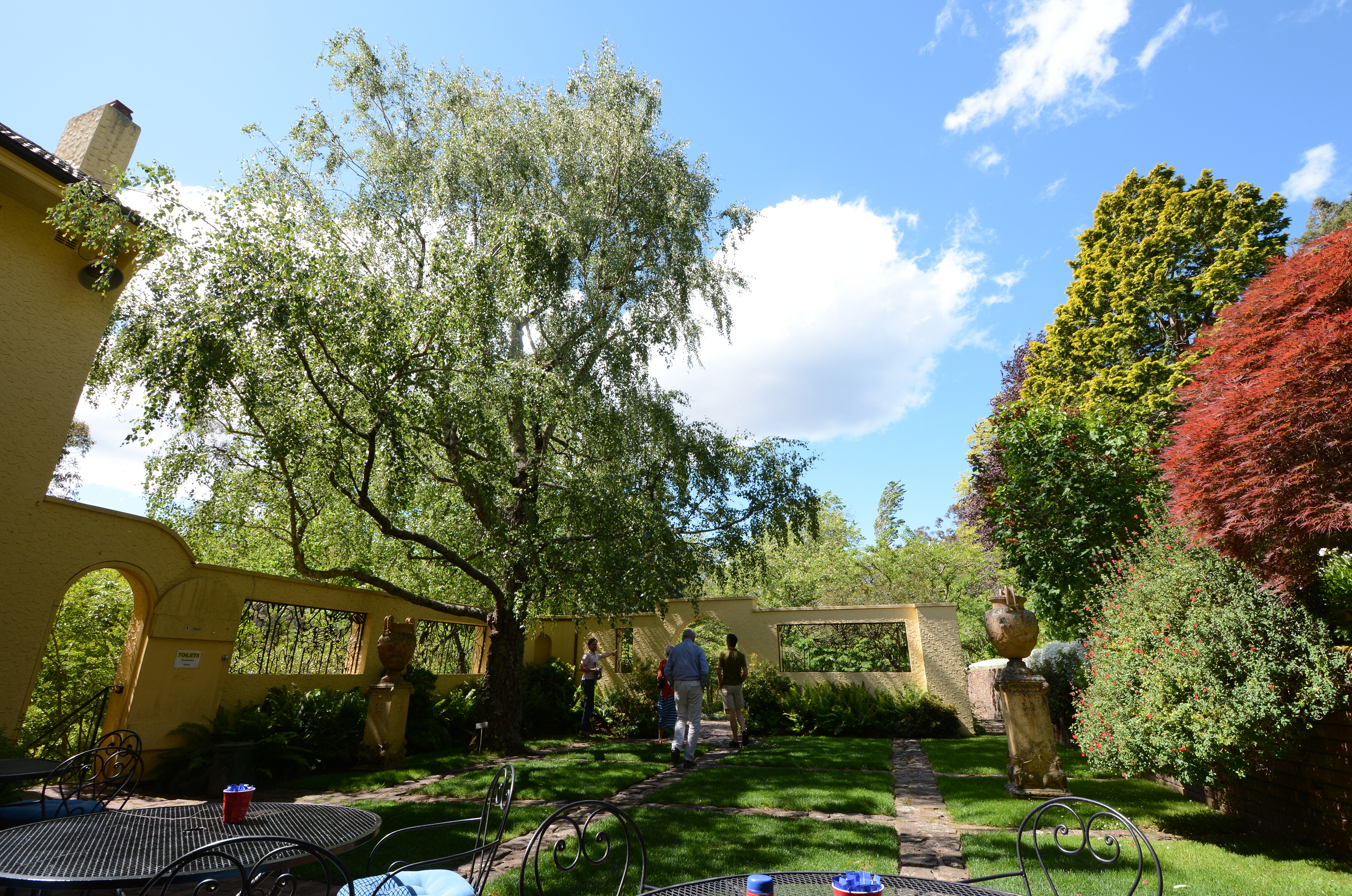

== See also ==
- Australian residential architectural styles
- Paul Sorensen (landscape gardener)
