= Leura =

- Suburb
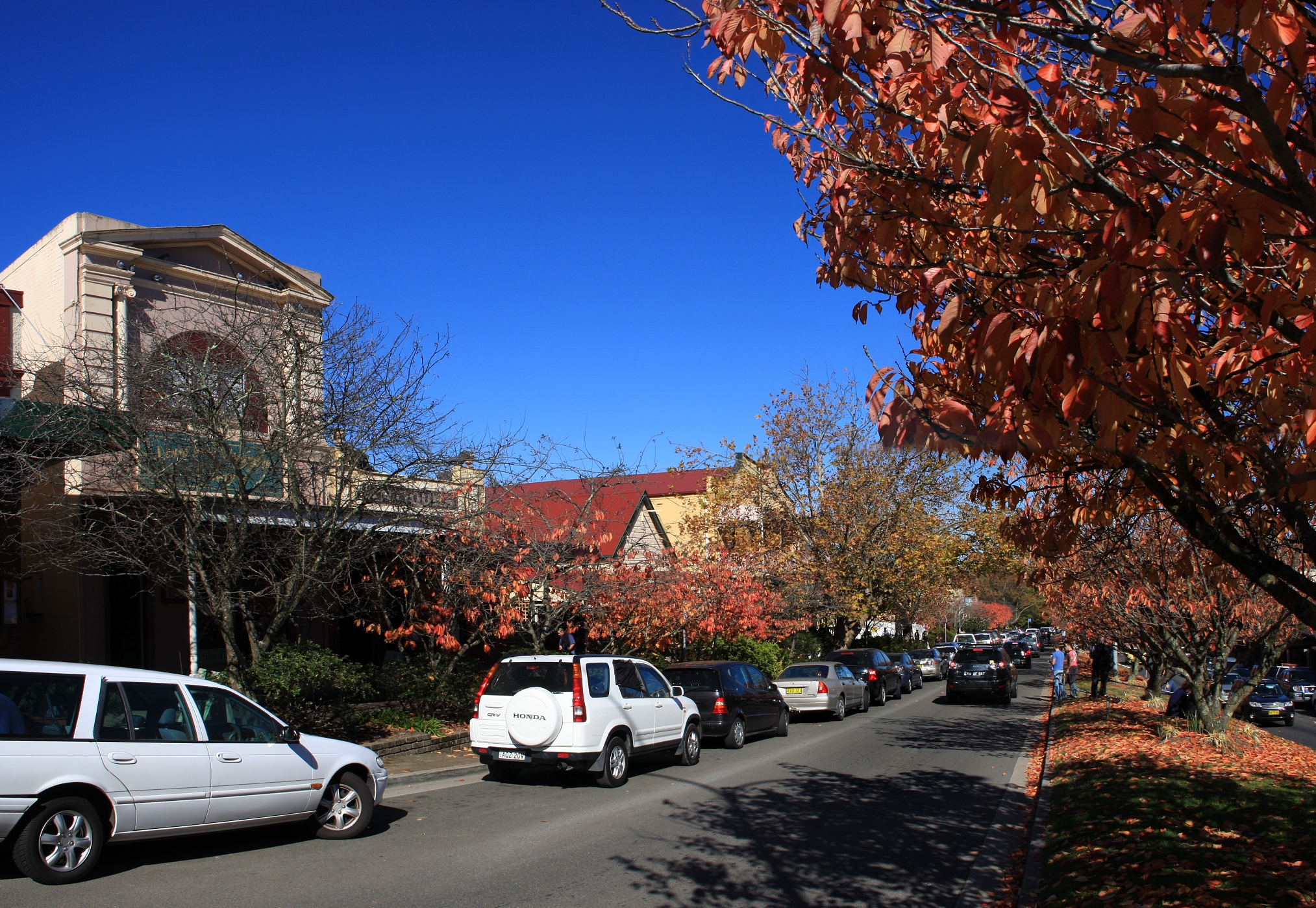
- Leura's main street, Leura Mall, looking south-east

- Interactive map of Leura
- Coordinates: 33°43′S 150°20′E
- Country: Australia
- State: New South Wales
- City: Blue Mountains
- LGA: City of Blue Mountains
- Location: 100 km (62 mi) W of Sydney CBD; 2 km (1.2 mi) E of Katoomba

Government
  - State electorate: Blue Mountains
  - Federal division: Macquarie
- Elevation: 985 m (3,232 ft)

Population
  - Total: 4,503 (2021 census)
- Postcode: 2780
Suburbs around Leura
Katoomba	Blue Mountains National Park	Wentworth Falls
Katoomba	Leura	Wentworth Falls
Katoomba	Jamison Valley	Wentworth Falls

Leura is a locality in the City of Blue Mountains local government area that is located 100 kilometres (62 mi) west of the Sydney central business district in New South Wales, Australia. It is one of the series of small towns stretched along the Main Western railway line and Great Western Highway that bisects the Blue Mountains National Park. Leura is situated adjacent to Katoomba, the largest centre in the upper mountains, and the two towns merge along Leura's western edge.

== History ==
The original inhabitants of the area were the Dharug and Gundungurra people. Archaeological evidence at Lyrebird Dell in South Leura suggests that Aboriginal occupation of the region may date back more than 12,000 years.

The first Europeans to enter the area, in 1813, was the expedition of Gregory Blaxland, William Lawson and William Charles Wentworth. They were followed by the expedition of George Evans in November 1813 and the road-building party of William Cox in the following year.

When the western railway line was constructed across the Blue Mountains in 1867–68, a gatehouse (No 9) was erected where the line crossed the Western Road near the present Sorensen Bridge. The gatekeepers were the first permanent European residents of the area, Another early presence occurred following the discovery of coal in the Jamison Valley below the present Leura golf course in the early 1880s, which led to the establishment of a colliery.

The earliest appearance of the name Leura was on a plan of subdivision, dated January–March 1881, for land south of the railway line belonging to Frederick Clissold. On his plan Clissold named a distinctive waterfall Leura Falls. Many theories have been advanced as to the origins of the name of Leura, but the debate has by no means been settled. When the land was offered for sale later in 1881 as the Leura Estate, however, the name was well on its way to general acceptance.

Perhaps the first large home erected at Leura was Leura House, high on the northern side of the Western Road, in the late 1880s. Another early house was Mondeval in Railway Parade which was built in the 1890s. A railway platform was erected in 1891, followed on Christmas Eve 1892 by the opening of the Leura Coffee Palace. Postal facilities were established in 1893 and during the next 20 years land on both sides of the railway line was subdivided and offered for sale. A new railway station was built in 1902.

While the early focus of activity had been along the Western Road, with the construction of the Coffee Palace and the railway station, Leura Mall began to dominate. Most of its commercial buildings date from 1900 to the 1920s and today the Mall is the focus of Leura's daily business activity.

== Heritage listings ==
Leura has a number of heritage-listed sites, including:

- Blue Mountains National Park: Blue Mountains walking tracks
- 37–49 Everglades Avenue: Everglades, Leura

== Population ==
At the 2021 census, there were 4,503 people in Leura, a decrease from the previous census. 71.2% of people were born in Australia. The next most common country of birth was England at 6.8%. 85.3% of people spoke English only at home. The most common responses for religion were No Religion 47.8%, Catholic 14.0% and Anglican 12.7%.

== Description ==
Leura's elevation of 985 metres (3,232 ft) AHD leads to occasional snowfall in winter and a climate that reflects all four seasons distinctly.

The village centre lies in the shopping strip on Leura Mall which is divided at that point by a wide grassy median strip planted with flowering cherry trees by Danish-born landscape gardener Paul Sorenson. The historic streetscape has been largely preserved, although there was local concern in 2009 regarding the development of a shopping complex on the site of a former distribution warehouse. Redesigned to better suit the Leura Mall ambience after consultations with the wider community, the new shopping complex was completed in 2010, hosting a Woolworths (now Metro) supermarket and liquor store. The historic post office building continues to operate as a post office but is also home to a real estate agency and two cafes.

Leura is home to many formal, English-style, cool-climate gardens, influenced or designed by Paul Sorenson, which provide elegant walks and the opportunity to visit when open to the public in early October each year.

In 2016, Leura was named in the list of top 50 most irresistible, exotic, historic and postcard-worthy small towns in Australia.

== Activities ==
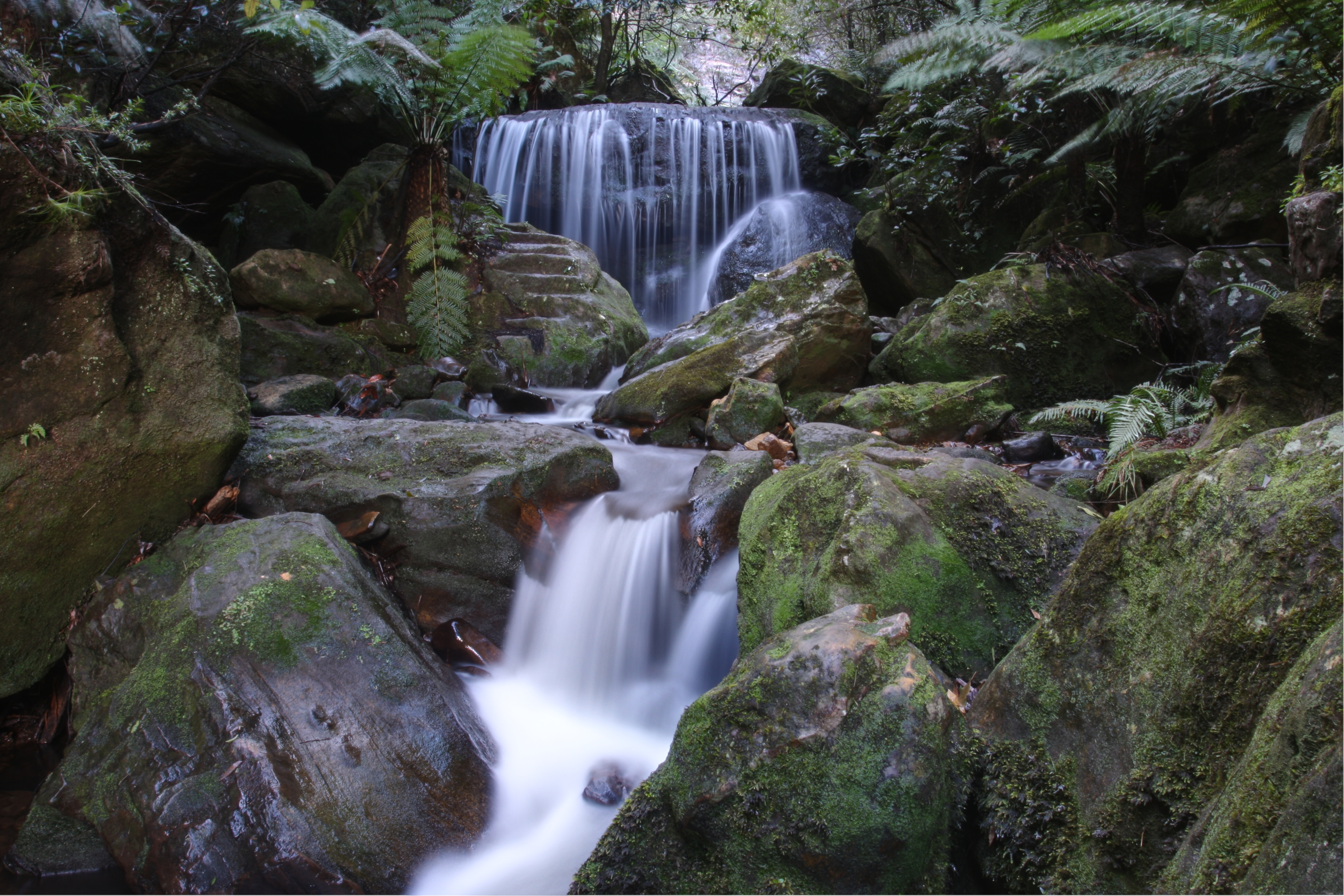
A small waterfall at the Leura Cascades. Rainforest plants here include the southern sassafras and the black olive berry, both relics from the age of Gondwana.

One of the most prominent of Leura's historic homes is Leuralla, the former home of Clive Evatt, an Australian politician, barrister and raconteur. Evatt was the brother of H.V. "Doc" Evatt, a former Chief Justice of New South Wales, Leader of the Australian Labor Party, the third President of the United Nations General Assembly, the first Chairman of the United Nations Atomic Energy Commission, and a Justice of the High Court of Australia. The property was home to the NSW Toy and Railway Museum. which closed in 2022, with the toys subsequently auctioned off. As of April 2024, the Leuralla property is for sale.

Another major attraction is the Everglades Gardens, the former home of Belgian-born industrialist Henri van de Velde, now administered by the National Trust. The Everglades includes van de Velde's Moderne-style home and 5 hectares (13 acres) of landscaped gardens designed by Paul Sorensen. The Everglades has an outdoor theatre which often hosts productions such as Cirquinox and the Leura Shakespeare festival.

Self-styled as "the Garden Village", the Leura Gardens Festival is held annually in October. The Festival is a registered charity and raises money for the Blue Mountains District ANZAC Memorial Hospital in Katoomba by opening private gardens to the public. Not connected with the garden festival but also held at the same time is the popular Leura Village Fair.

Natural attractions include Sublime Point to the south and Gordon Falls park, which offer panoramic views of the Jamison Valley, and Leura Cascades in the southwest. There is a network of tracks, some part of the Prince Henry walk and the recently completed Grand Cliff Top Walk, that lead from Wentworth Falls Railway Station to Echo Point, taking in many attractions along the way, including in the Leura area: the Pool of Siloam, Elysian Lookout, Olympian Lookout, Leura Cascades, Leura Falls, Jamison Lookout, Linda Falls and the Dardanelles Pass, before ascending to Echo Point via the Giant Stairway. The area is popular for bushwalking and photography.

== Gallery ==
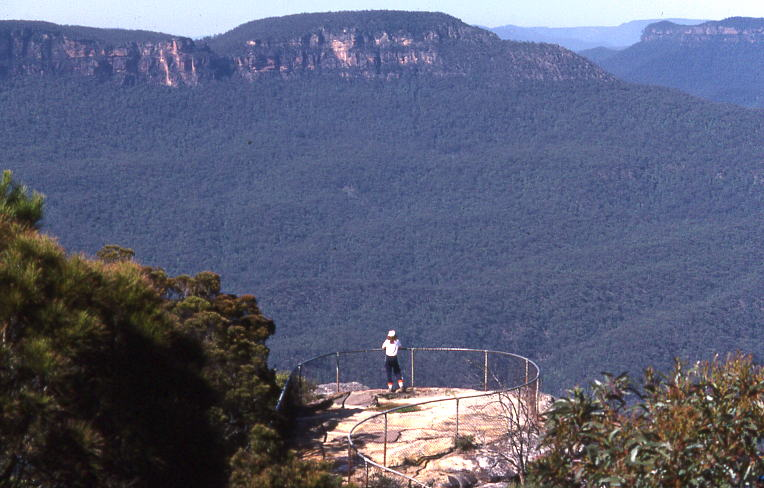
View of Mount Solitary from Sublime Point lookout

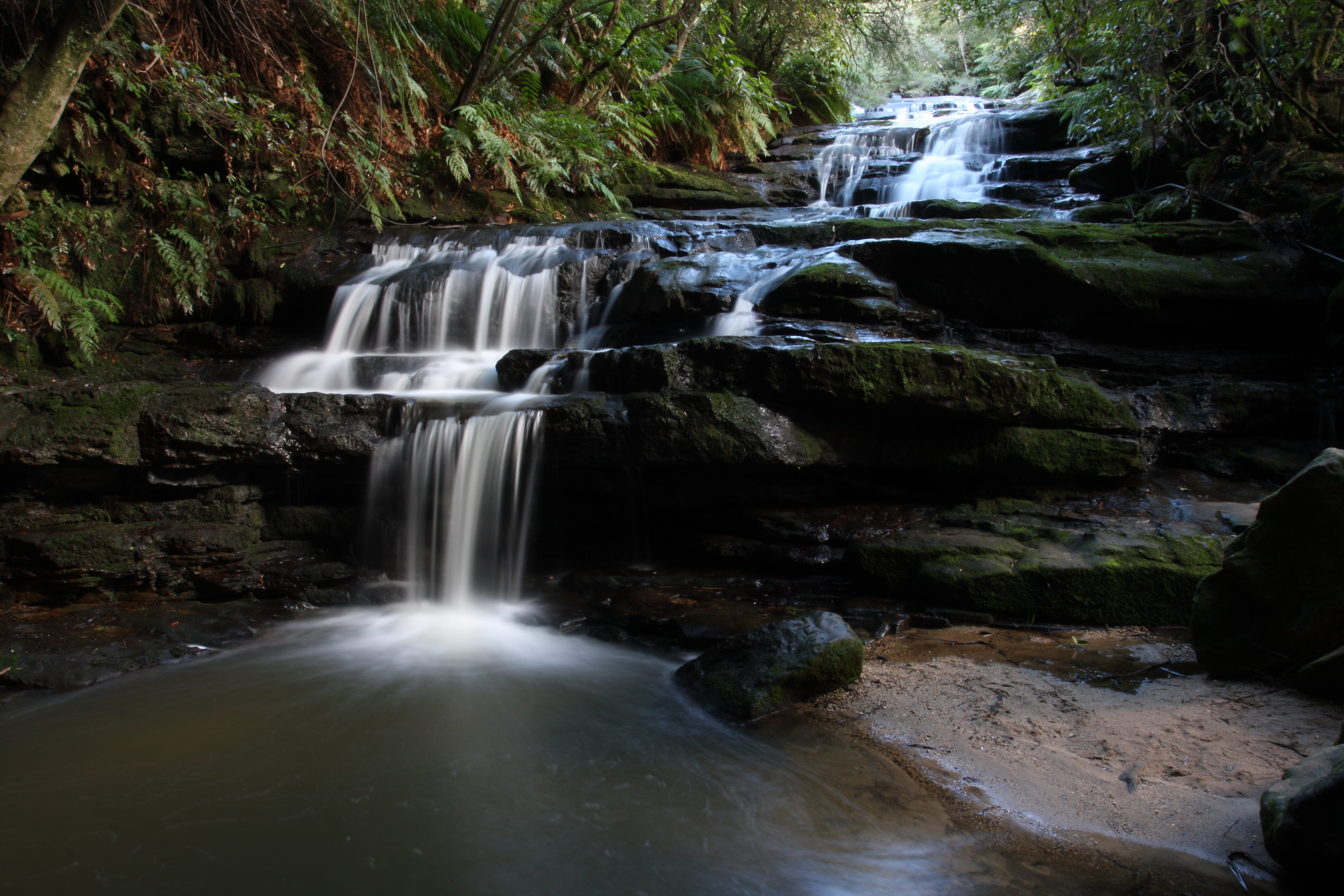
A small waterfall in the Leura Cascades

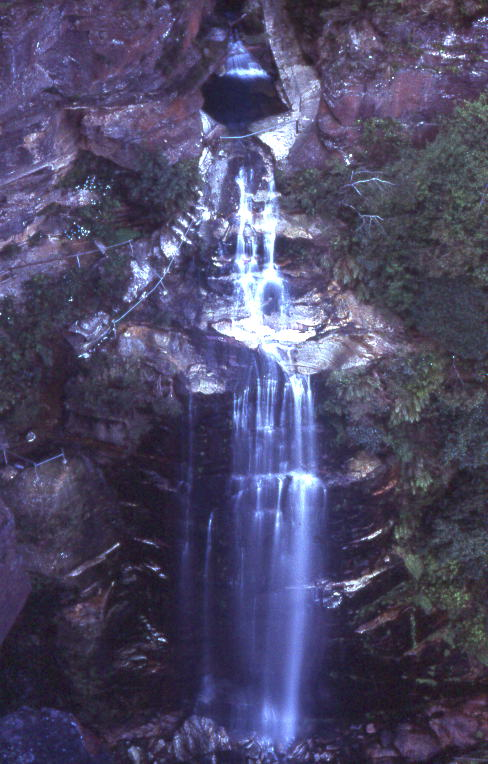
Leura Falls

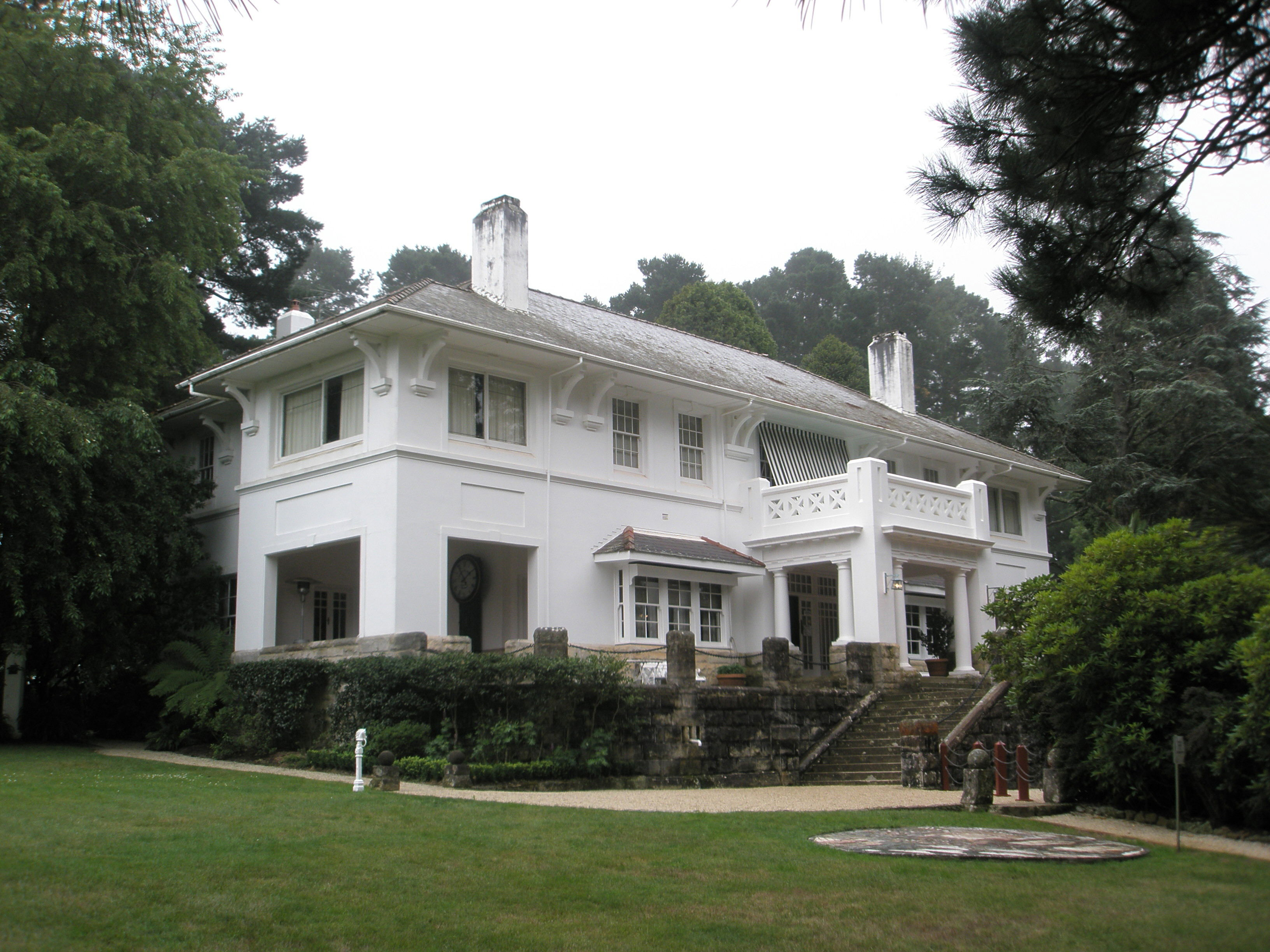
Leuralla historic house, Olympian Parade

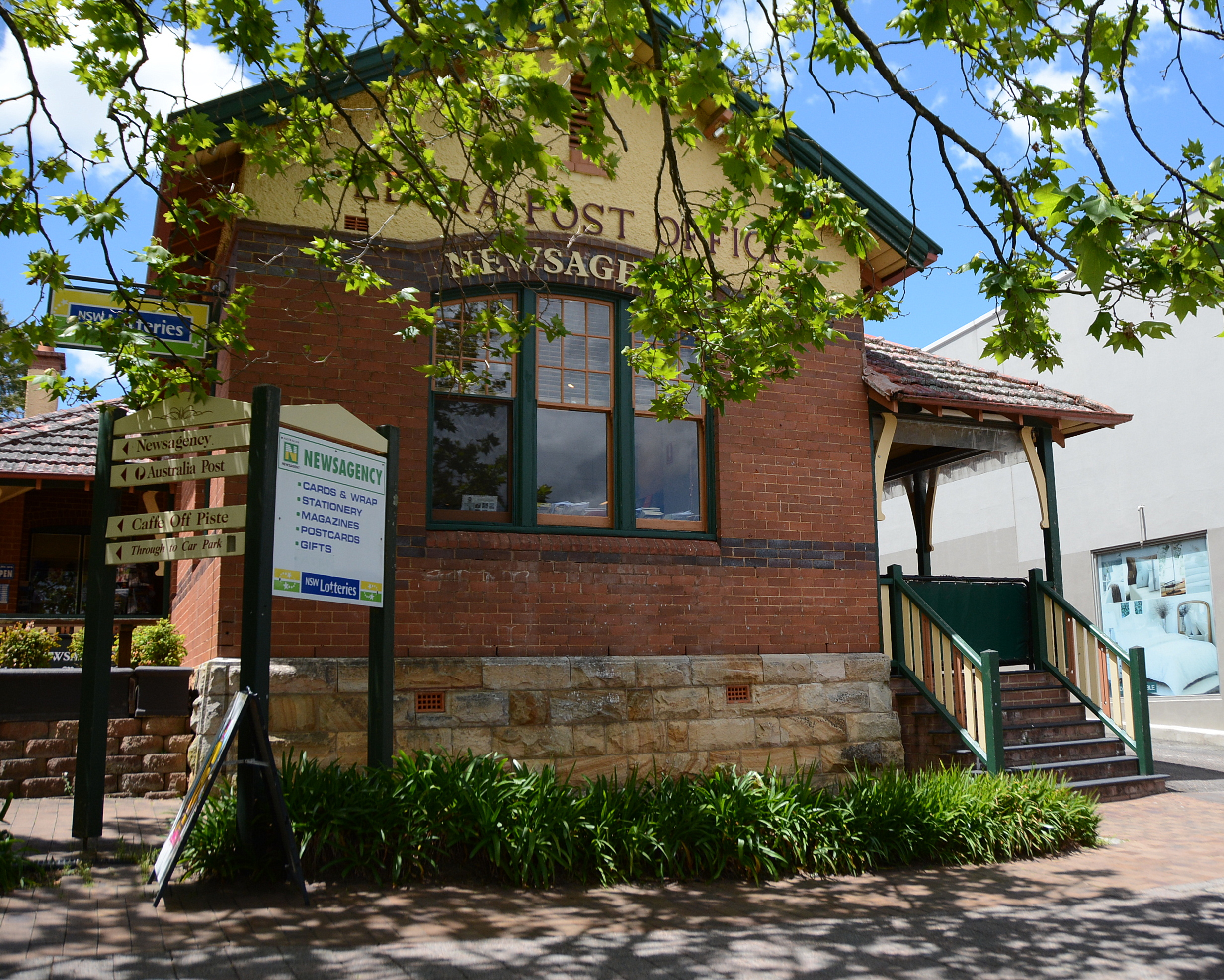
Old Leura post office

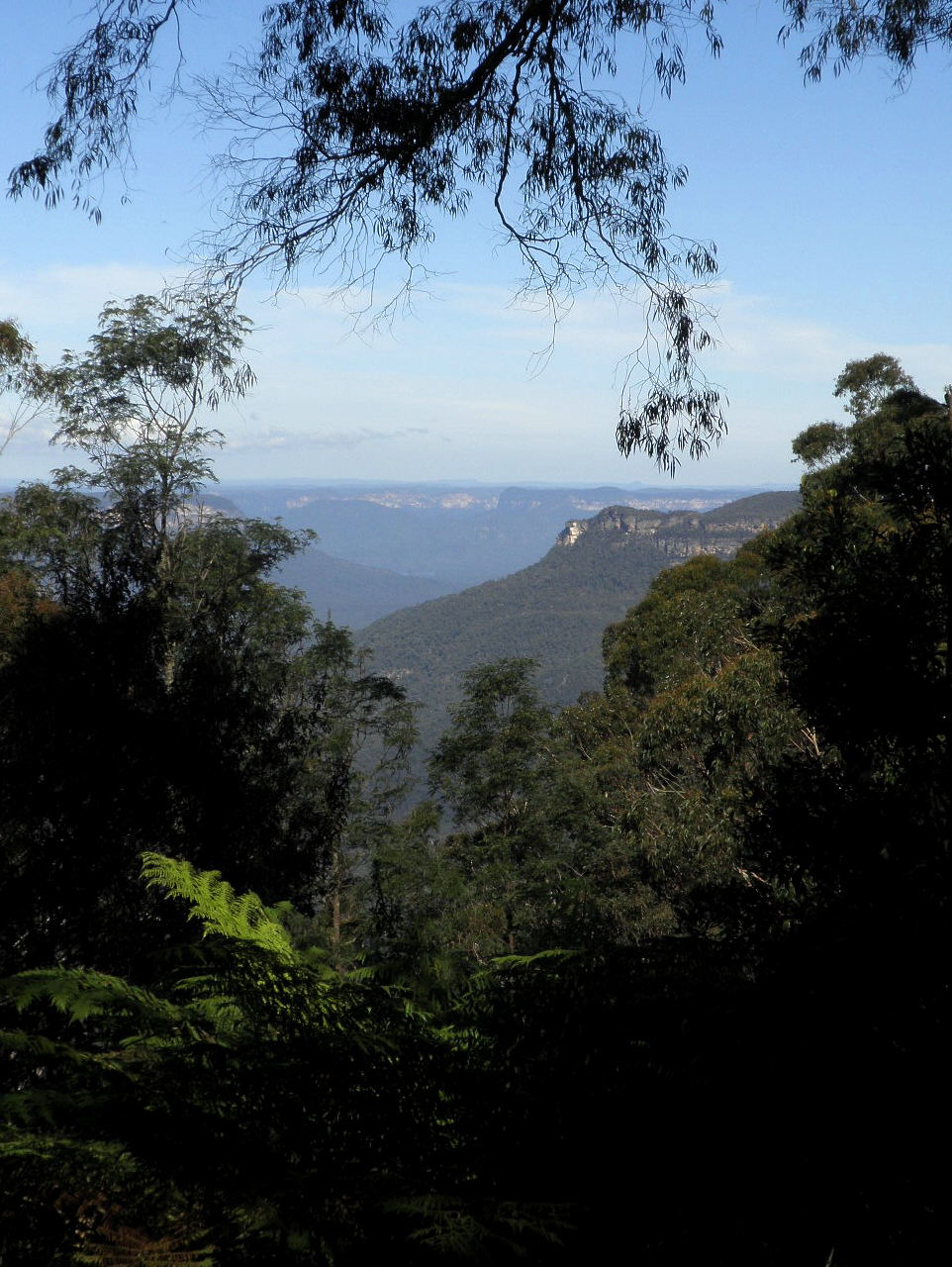
View from Gordon Falls, looking towards the Jamison Valley

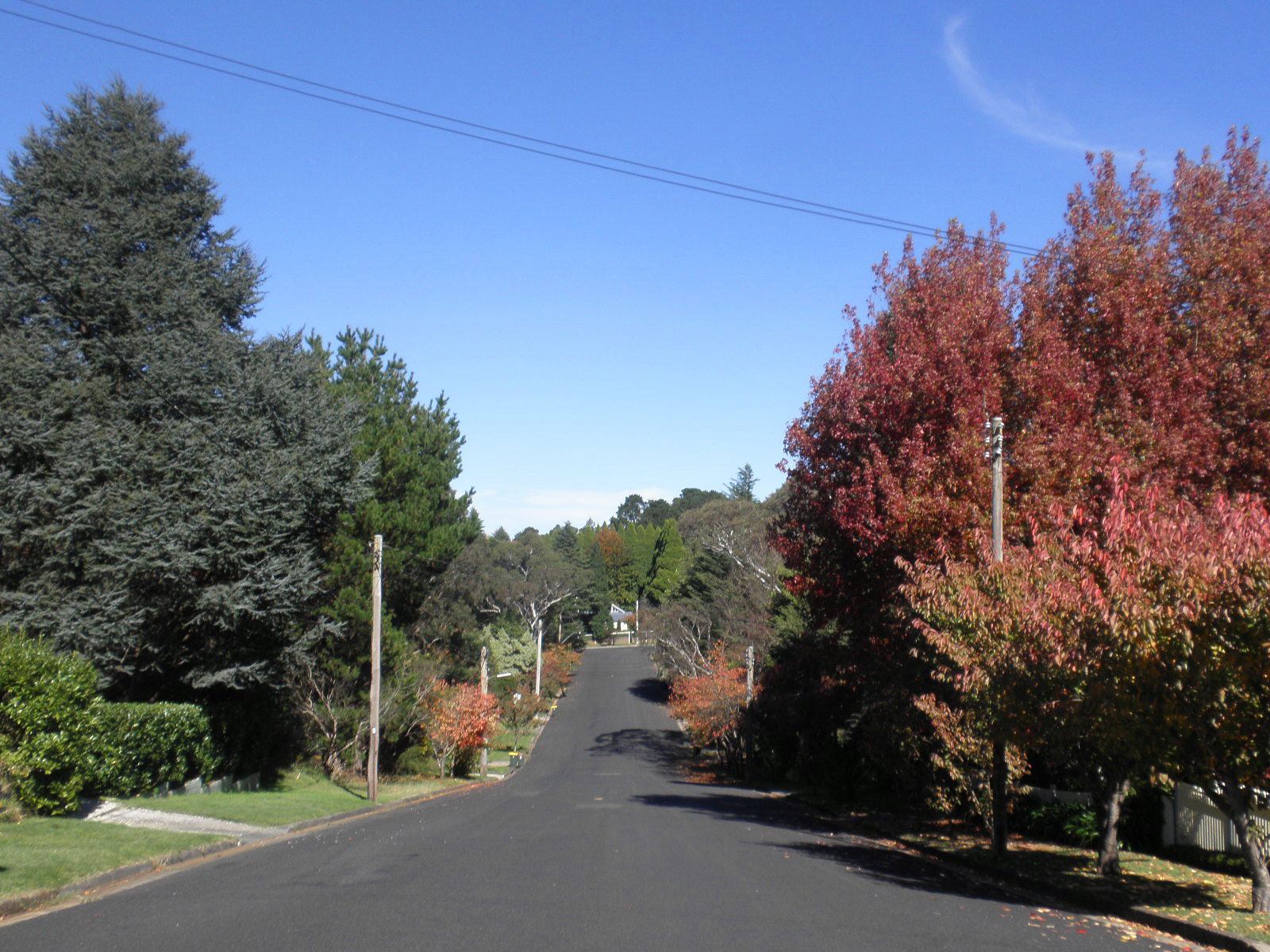
View south down Abbey Street

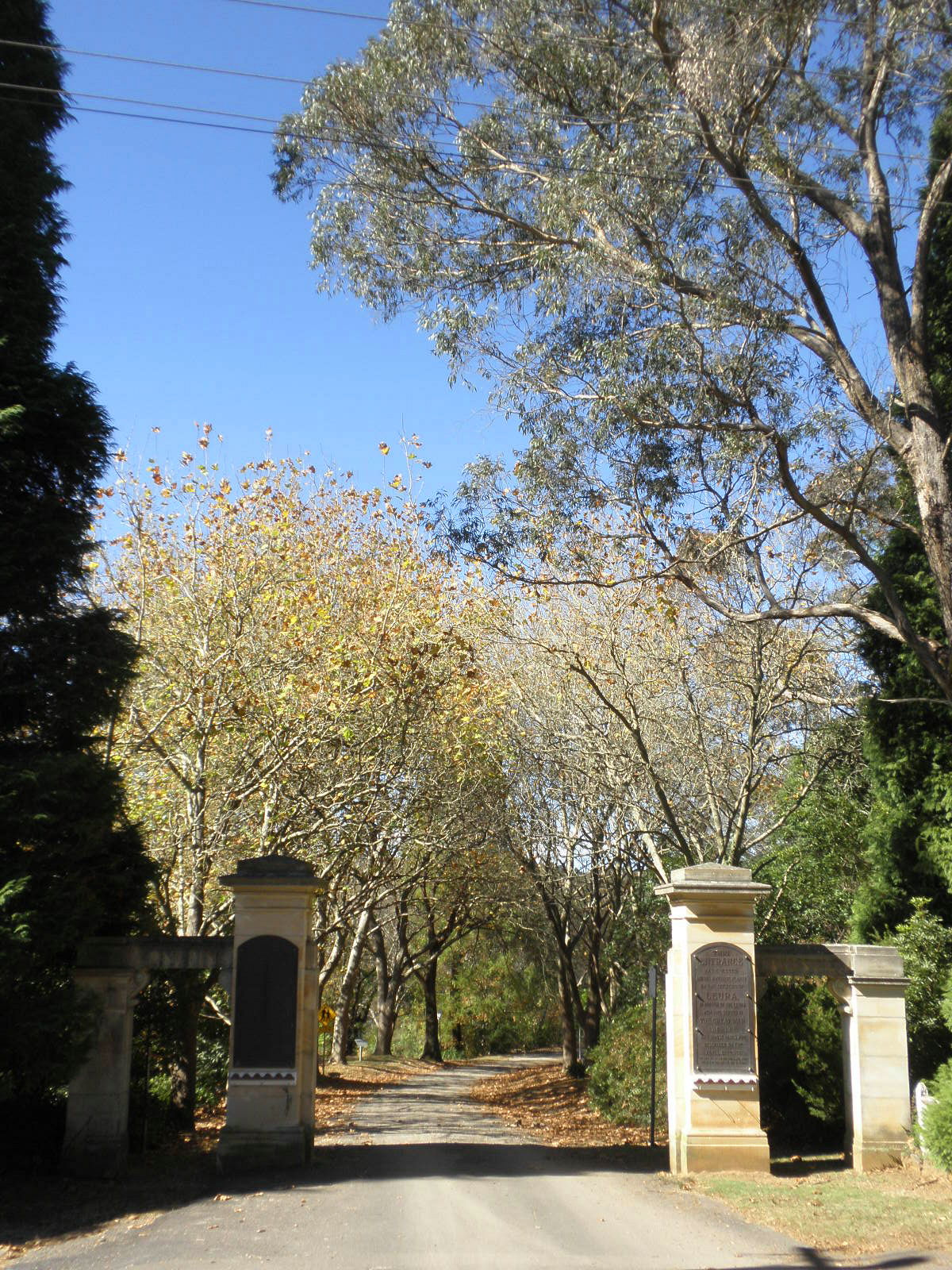
Victory gates commemorating war dead, Lone Pine Avenue

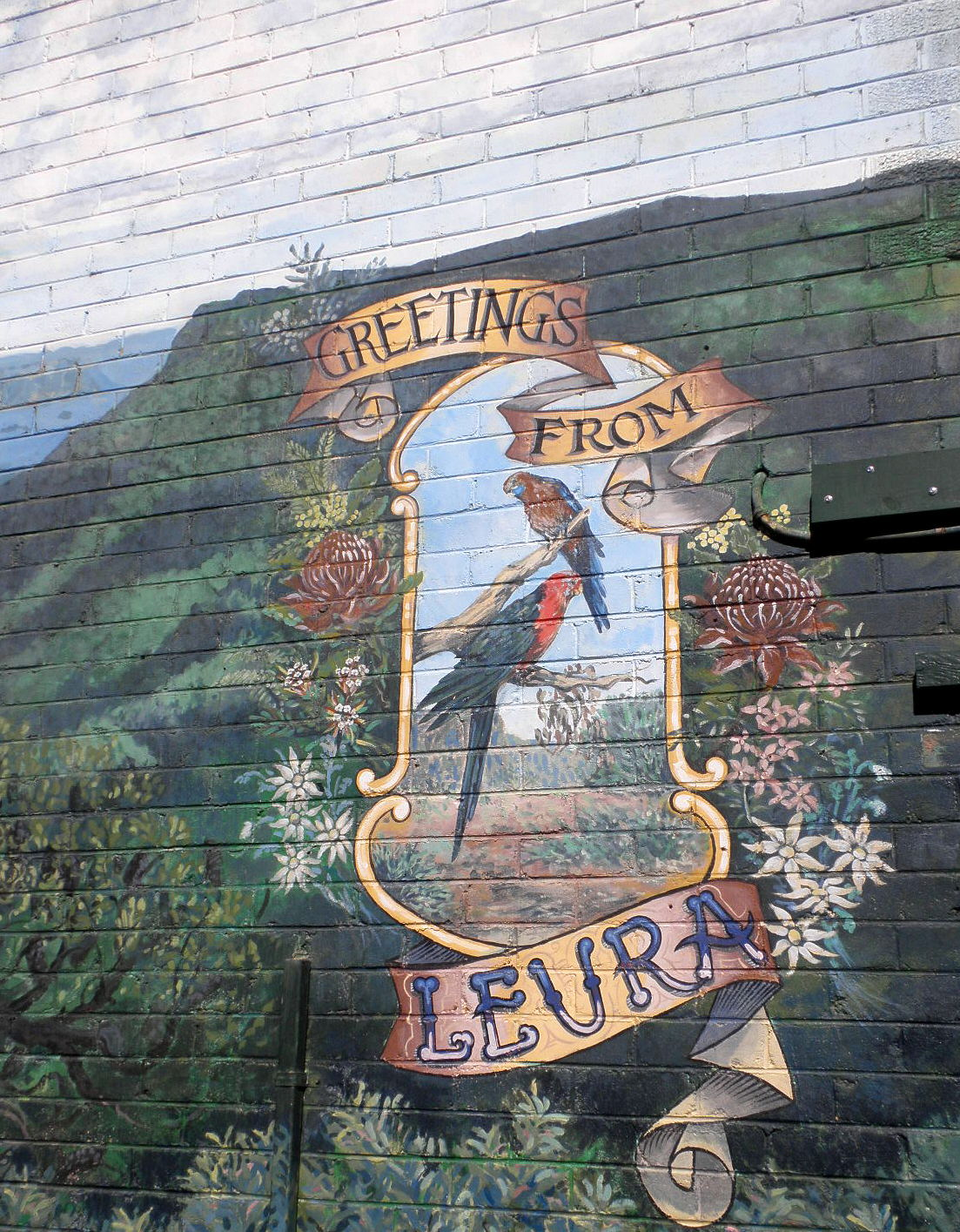
Mural on laneway wall, opposite the Wayzgoose cafe, Leura Mall

== Notable residents ==
- Aaron Blabey, children's author and AFI-winning actor
- Patti Crocker, actress and author of Radio Days.
- Matt Drummond, film director and Emmy Award winner
- Paul Sorensen, landscape gardener
- David Stratton, film critic and television personality
- Murray Wilcox, former Federal Court Judge and President of the Australian Conservation Foundation
