= Geography of Wollongong =

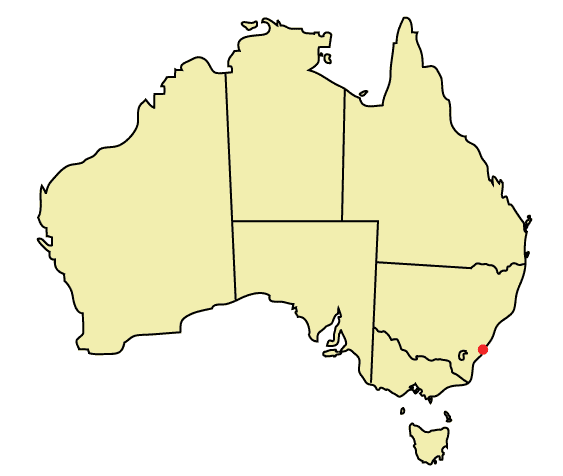
Wollongong's location

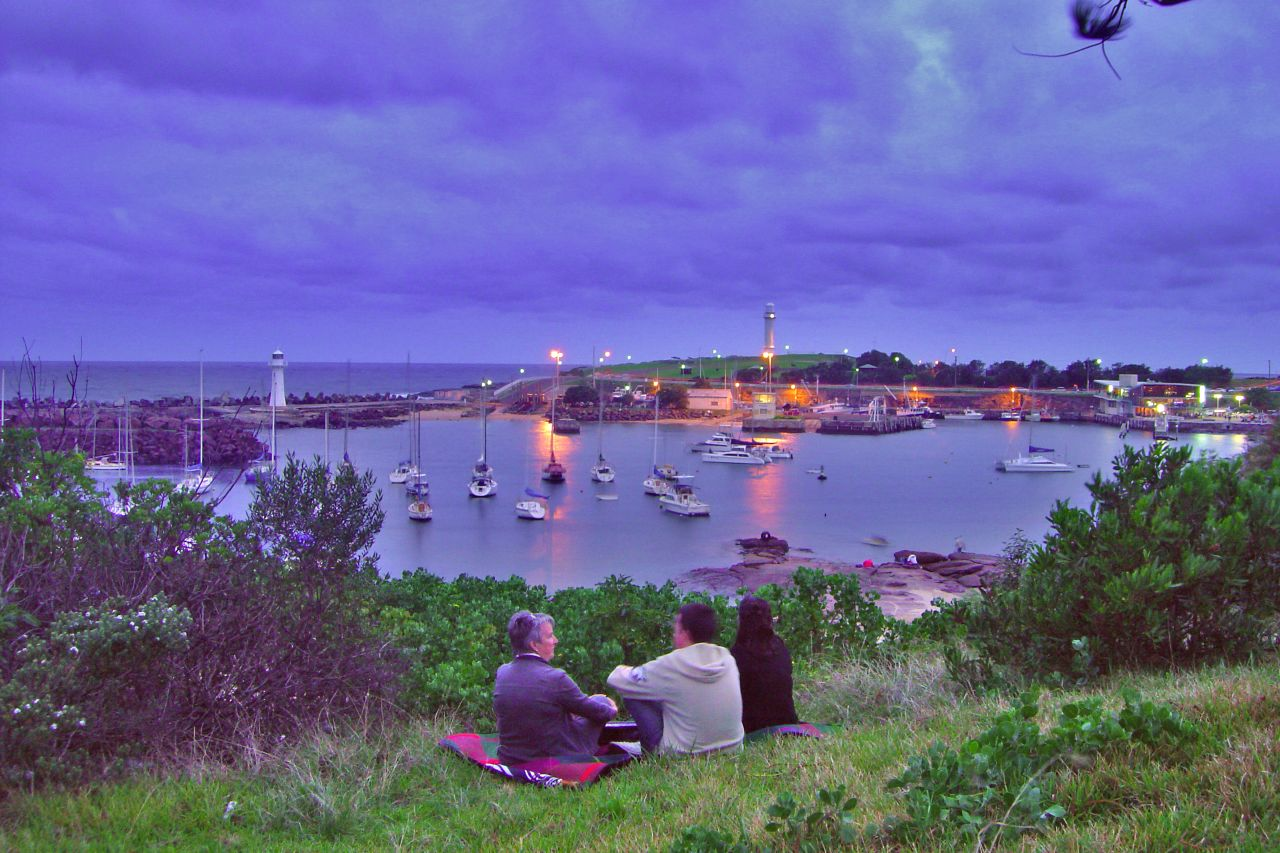
Wollongong Harbour at dusk

The city of Wollongong has a distinct geography. It lies on a narrow coastal plain flanked by the Pacific Ocean to the east and a steep sandstone precipice known as the Illawarra Escarpment to the west, most notably Mount Keira, joined to the escarpment by a high saddle.

The coastal plain is widest in the south and narrows to the north. Despite being on a plain there are minor hills within it, most notably Mount Nebo to the west, and closest to Wollongong is the hill mass west of the railway of Mount Mangerton and Mount Saint Thomas which gives a distinct character to the town, Church Hill and Smiths Hill in the CBD and just north in the high-rise apartment district west of the harbour, Flagstaff Hill at Flagstaff Point, Cobblers Hill to the southwest of Figtree, Flagstaff Hill, home of the Nan Tien Temple, a local landmark, Cringila Hill to the south, and Hospital Hill to the west, north of a small vale separating it from Mount Mangerton. These hills do not generally exceed a hundred metres or so in height. Mount Keira road, the first and still used pass over the escarpment and past the mountain of that name, follows a low ridge, one of several such minor ridges in the plain, from Hospital Hill, formerly Garden Hill, on top of which the Wollongong Hospital is situated. The plain is much lower than the escarpment, but contains low hills and small valleys, which gives the city a distinct and interesting mix of altitude. Mangerton and Mount St Thomas both have very small areas of bushland reserve, but littering and illegal bikeriding have become a problem. However, efforts are being made to the contrary such as bushcare volunteering. To the northwest of the city foothills of Mount Keira travel down towards the coast creating a rippled look, as at the Wollongong Botanic Gardens.

North of Wollongong is Stuart Park/Fairy Lagoon, part of the Fairy/Para Creek system. North of this is Puckeys Estate Reserve, site of a salt works, and a bushwalking reserve. This reserve is known for its birdlife and coastal wetlands. The shallow lagoon is prone to tidal change and has been known to flood.

To the south of the city is J.J.Kelly Park and south of this the Rotary Greenhouse Park, once a waste pile it has been planted into a garden area and has a bike track and lookout over the city and Port Kembla steelworks. It also has views to the mountains and over the city. This hill has no official name but is known by some locals as 'the overseer'. Below this hill to the west is a small area of wetlands, the remnants of the once larger Tom Thumb Lagoon which once stretched to Swan Street but is now restricted to this small area of nature reserve.

Most of the city's northern suburbs are on more level ground, with some mild hills such as Woonona and Bulli Ridges. Ground level in the plain generally lies under thirty metres until reaching the foothills.

To the north of Wollongong the plain becomes so narrow that the coastal road Lawrence Hargrave Drive once precariously hugged the cliffline until rock falls forced its closure. It was replaced in 2005 by the Sea Cliff Bridge. The bridge carries both vehicular and pedestrian traffic just off the coast, crossing the submerged rock shelf. The Illawarra Railway must go through several tunnels to reach the Sydney metropolitan area. The Southern Freeway and Old Princes Highway provide alternative inland routes, descending the escarpment further south at Bulli Pass or at Mount Ousley, entering the coastal plain at Gwynneville, just north of Wollongong's city centre. Pass building was at first done by convicts and some old passes remain as tracks or management trails, such as O'Brien's Road at Mount Nebo and Rixons Pass west of Woonona.

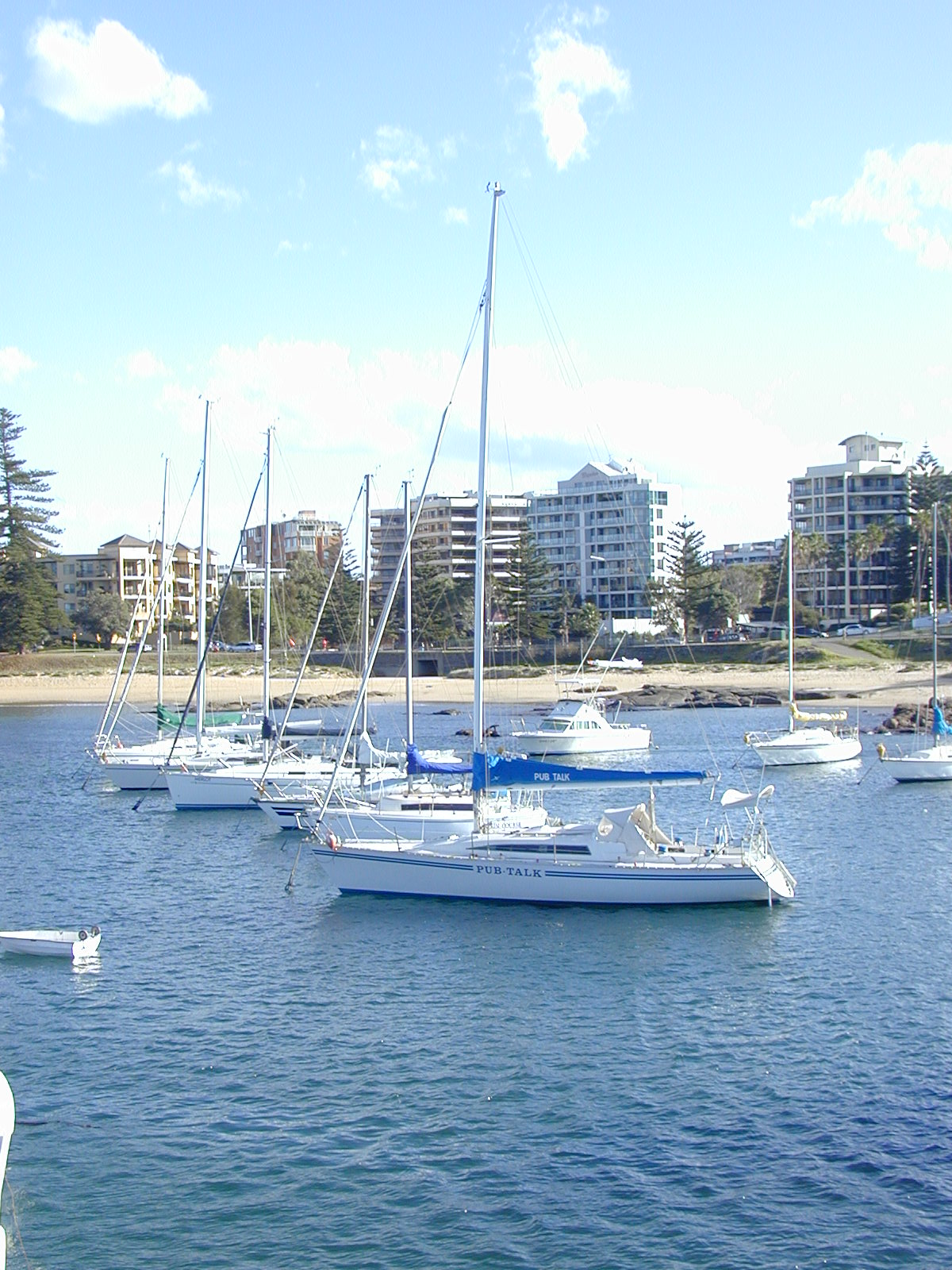
Wollongong Harbor

The Escarpment ranges between 150 and 750 metres (490 and 2,460 ft) above sea level, with locally famous mountains such as Mount Keira, 464 metres, Mount Kembla, 534 metres, Broker's Nose (Corrimal), 440 metres and Mount Murray to the south, 768 metres. The Escarpment contains strata of coal measures, and the adit entrances to many coal mines have been established along the slopes of the Escarpment right throughout Wollongong. The plain itself is traversed by several short but flood-prone and fast-flowing streams and creeks such as Para Creek, Allans Creek and Mullet Creek. These plains consist of highly fertile alluvium, which made Wollongong so attractive to agriculturists in the 19th century. The coastline itself consists of many beaches characterised by fine pale gold-coloured sands; however, these beaches are sometimes interrupted by prominent and rocky headlands jutting into the sea.

Just southeast of Wollongong City, near Red Point at Port Kembla, atop a coastal rise 71 meters above the sea, there is a military reserve and north of it sit the remains of defense constructions known as Hill 60 (used during World War II period). The fortifications were manned by the Illowra Battery. Below Hill 60 lies a beach, the southern end of which offers the less pleasant view of sewage works. However, out to sea across from the beach, there's a group of five islands (known as "The Five Islands"). The two northern islands are called the "Tom Thumb Islands" after the vessel used by late 18th century explorers/captains in the British Navy, George Bass and Matthew Flinders. The island closest to the reserve (among the southern three) is called Rocky Islet and is little more than a rocky projection from the water. The next island is called Big Island, and is made of two almost separated parts, an eastern and western, thus creating the common myth that it comprises two of the five islands. The third is Martins Island, named after Bass and Flinders' assistant. The islands are a wildlife refuge.

A large coastal saltwater lagoon called Lake Illawarra is to the south of the city, south of the Wonwongarang ridge, separated from the Pacific Ocean by a long sandy spit, being once a bay. Just to the north of the lake is Port Kembla, a natural harbour that has been considerably expanded by human-made excavation and reclamation works.

== Inner City Geography ==
The geography is characterised by Flagstaff Point to the east, and Wollongong Beach south of that. To the north is Wollongong Harbour, west of Flagstaff Point and going north, and north of this is North Wollongong or simply North Beach and the lagoon at Puckeys Estate Reserve. Wollongong Beach is a northern extenuation of Coniston Beach and goes relatively straight north to Flagstaff Point. West of the beach is Lang Park, originally a freshwater lagoon.

This point is a headland with eroded low-level cliffs and rocky areas about it, including two 'formations', Pulpit Rock to the north and a similar blockier rock formation to the south. These rocks also include the old Nun's Baths and a seawall of the old fort. This hill is significant historically and contains within it old coke ovens, and was the site of a flagstaff and cottage, as well as military operations during the war (called Hill 60, see above). It is the site of several restored canons and two lighthouses, a feature peculiar to the city in the state. The older one, at the harbour entrance, dates to the 1880s and is made of boiler plate, the newer one, constructed in 1937, stands atop the hill and is still in use today, though using an automated system rather than a manned operation system. The point has a lookout and picnic area, a grassy area extends mostly over it and a cliff walk is available along the fence built to stop suicides and other dangers. A trigonometry station, though broken, stands at the eastern tip of the point. The point is shaped roughly like a B and has an inwards facing area to the right of the trigonometry station.

To the west of Flagstaff Point is Belmore Basin and Brighton Beach. Belmore Basin is the man-made section of Wollongong Harbour and was built using convict labour and is a heritage site with plaques along a history walk. There are two eastern breakwaters, a small stubby one of cement topped stone for the old lighthouse, and a large artificial boulder one with a light at the end for aiding ships in fog. At the portside is the fish market and a number of restaurants. Along the harbour dock are several charter vessels and private fishing boats. In the main harbour are private yachts and recreational vessels. This is to the west. Brighton Beach has recently been heavily eroded by the sea and is very thin. It stretches from the Lions Park playgrounds to the east to the western breakwater to the west. This is owned by the department of lands and used by photographers. From here the coastal cliff runs to North Beach, passing the baths and indoor seapools. Along here the Wollongong to Thirroul Bike Track or Heartcare Walk runs, this section is the Peace Mile section and runs to North Beach. Atop the cliffs, the edge of Smiths Hill mass, is another path and Cliff Drive. Settlement goes up to this road. The cliffs and grass/bushland about them are managed by bushcare groups and include native and invasive weed species. Lantana and Bitou Bush are prevalent, as well as Moreton Bay figs and Acacias. North of this is North Beach at the end of the cliff. This popular surfing spot is used for competitions and private recreation, though has been damaged by erosion in the June 2007 windgusts.

North Beach stretches to Fairy Meadow Beach at Stuart Park Lagoon. West of this is a four to five-metre rise behind which is Stuart Park, a local recreational grounds. The lagoon is salt water and harbours many bird and fish species but is prone to littering.

North of Wollongong are stretches of beach, lagoons and creeks as well as low headlands, which become higher to the north, eventually giving way to the cliffs visible in the Royal National Park. Such lagoons include Bellambi Lagoon and the entrance to Towradgi Creek. Headlands include low formations such as Collins Rock/Flat Rock at Woonona and more prominent points near Thirroul and the northern suburbs.
