= Illawarra escarpment =

Mountain range in New South Wales, Australia

Illawarra
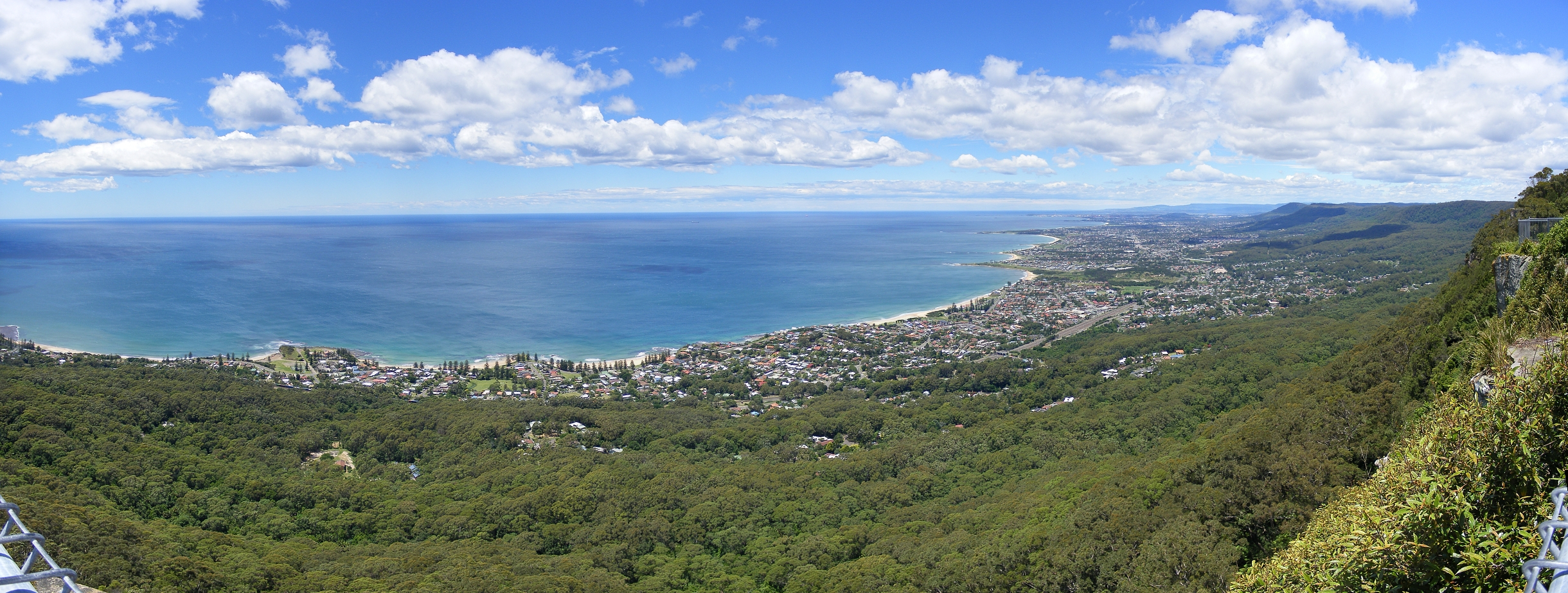
- Lookout from the Illawarra escarpment above Wombarra over the northern Illawarra plain viewing Austinmer, Thirroul, Bulli, Wollongong up to Port Kembla in the far distance.

Highest point
- Peak: Bells Hill, New South Wales
- Elevation: 803 m (2,635 ft)
- Coordinates: 34°37′S 150°36′E

Dimensions
- Length: 92 km (57 mi) NNE

Geography
- Location within New South Wales
- Country: Australia
- State: New South Wales
- Region: Illawarra
- Range coordinates: 34°22′02″S 150°52′33″E

Geology
- Orogeny: Sydney Basin
- Rock age: Tertiary

The Illawarra escarpment, or officially the Illawarra Range, is the fold-created cliffs and plateau-eroded outcrop mountain range west of the Illawarra coastal plain south of Sydney, in the state of New South Wales, Australia. The range encloses the Illawarra region which stretches from Stanwell Park in the north to Kiama, Gerringong and the Shoalhaven River in the south.

Bells Hill, west of Knights Hill, is the highest point in the range at 803 metres (2,635 ft) AHD on the range's plateau; with a number of other peaks on the escarpment ranging from 300 metres (980 ft) to a maximum of 768 metres (2,520 ft) at Mount Murray southwest of Dapto.

== History ==
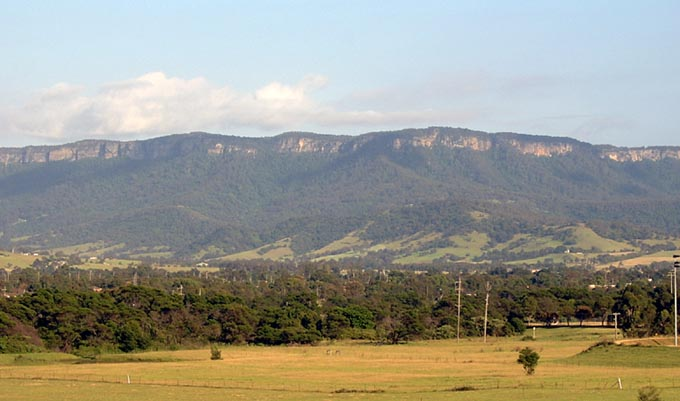
An early morning view of the Illawarra escarpment west of Albion Park (20 km south of Wollongong)

The escarpment or scarp was created between 225 and 280 million years ago and since eroded by creeks to its present height around 30 million years ago. Most of it is sandstone, with many Hawkesbury sandstone boulders and ledges visible in addition to the actual cliffs. Its maximum heights are reached in the south, west of Albion Park at Knights Hill, 709 metres (2,326 ft), and Mount Murray, 768 metres (2,520 ft). This forms the eastern edge of the Southern Highlands plateau, uplifted along with the Blue Mountains around 70 million years ago.

Many of the towns on the coastal plain adjacent to the escarpment were first founded to harvest the cedar trees on the slopes of the escarpment or the coal seams beneath it. With the original logging industry of the area came the need for passes over the escarpment, creating such ones as Rixons Pass, Bulli Pass, O'Briens Road and Macquarie Pass. The city of Wollongong is the largest city in the Illawarra.

== Flora and fauna ==
The escarpment contains a wide variety of native flora and fauna and is a haven for many forms of wildlife.

It is known for the Illawarra flame tree with its bright foliage, as well as rare surviving red cedar trees that haven't been logged. On Saddleback Mountain and at Minnamurra Rainforest and other places there are remnant localities of rainforest bushland, as well as, to the north, dry sclerophyll forests. The southern typical bush meets the northern at Mount Kembla, creating a unique effect.

Many native species thrive here such as wallabies, brushtail possums and gliding possums, frogs, goannas, brush turkeys, flying foxes, snakes, bower birds, glossy black cockatoos and other colourful parrots, owls and native birds of prey.

The area also has many introduced species including fallow deer, red deer, rabbits, feral cats and red foxes. It also acts as a significant haven for species that have been affected by environmental disturbances such as development and bushfire. There are currently 12 threatened animal species in the area.

Some native plants photographed in the region

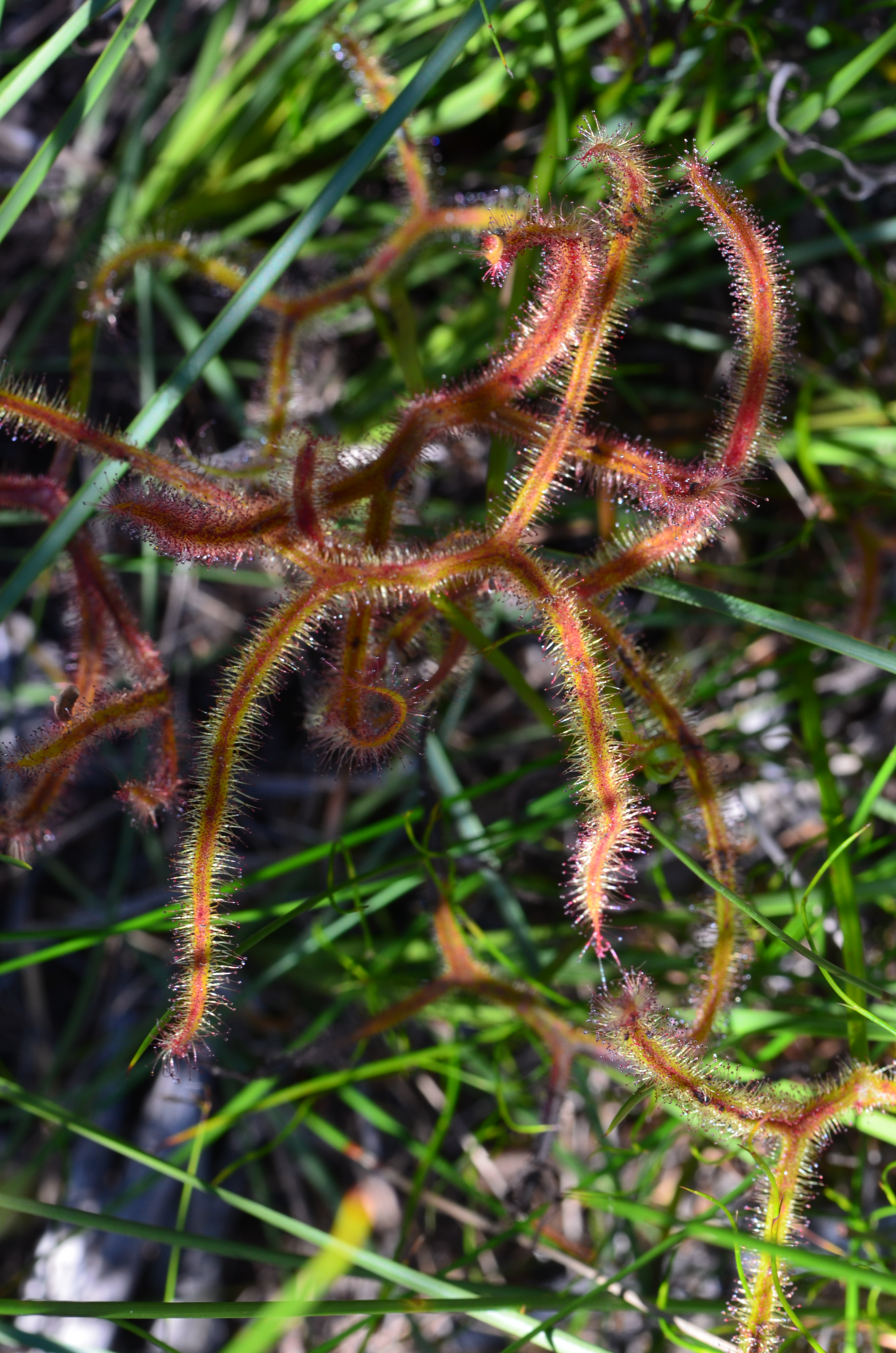
Drosera binata, Barren Grounds

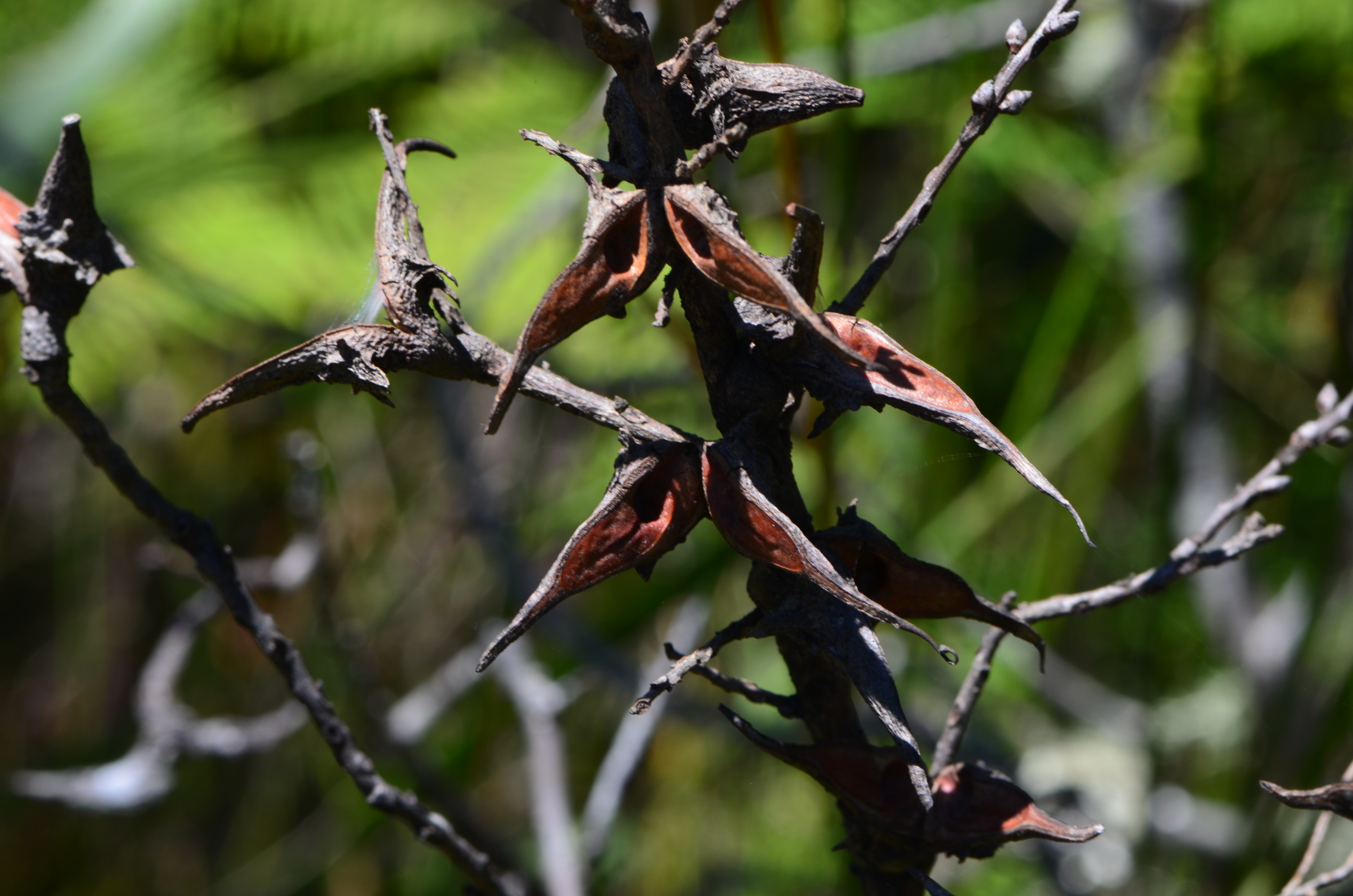
Hakea teretifolia, Barren Grounds

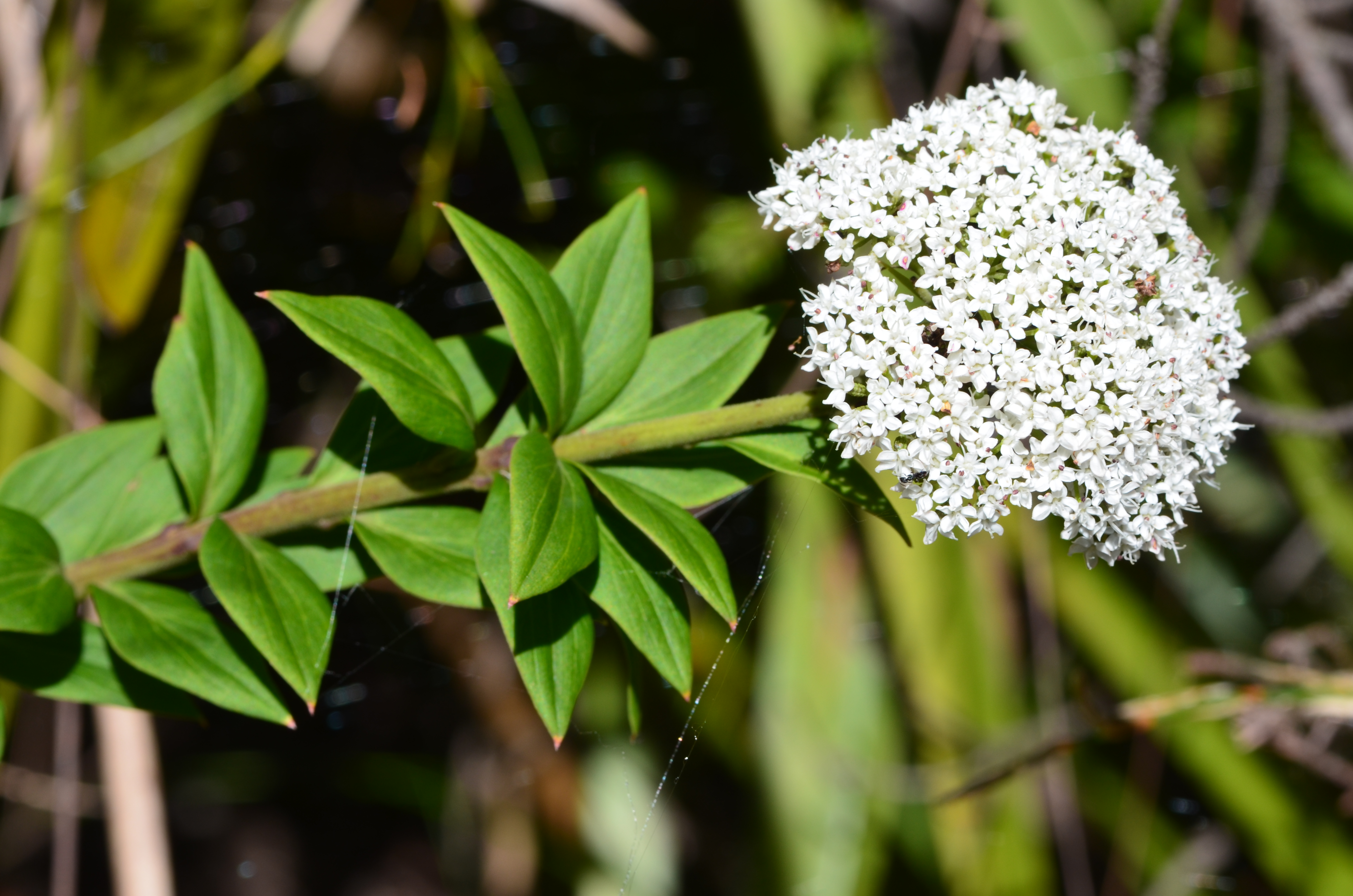
Platysace lanceolata, Barren Grounds

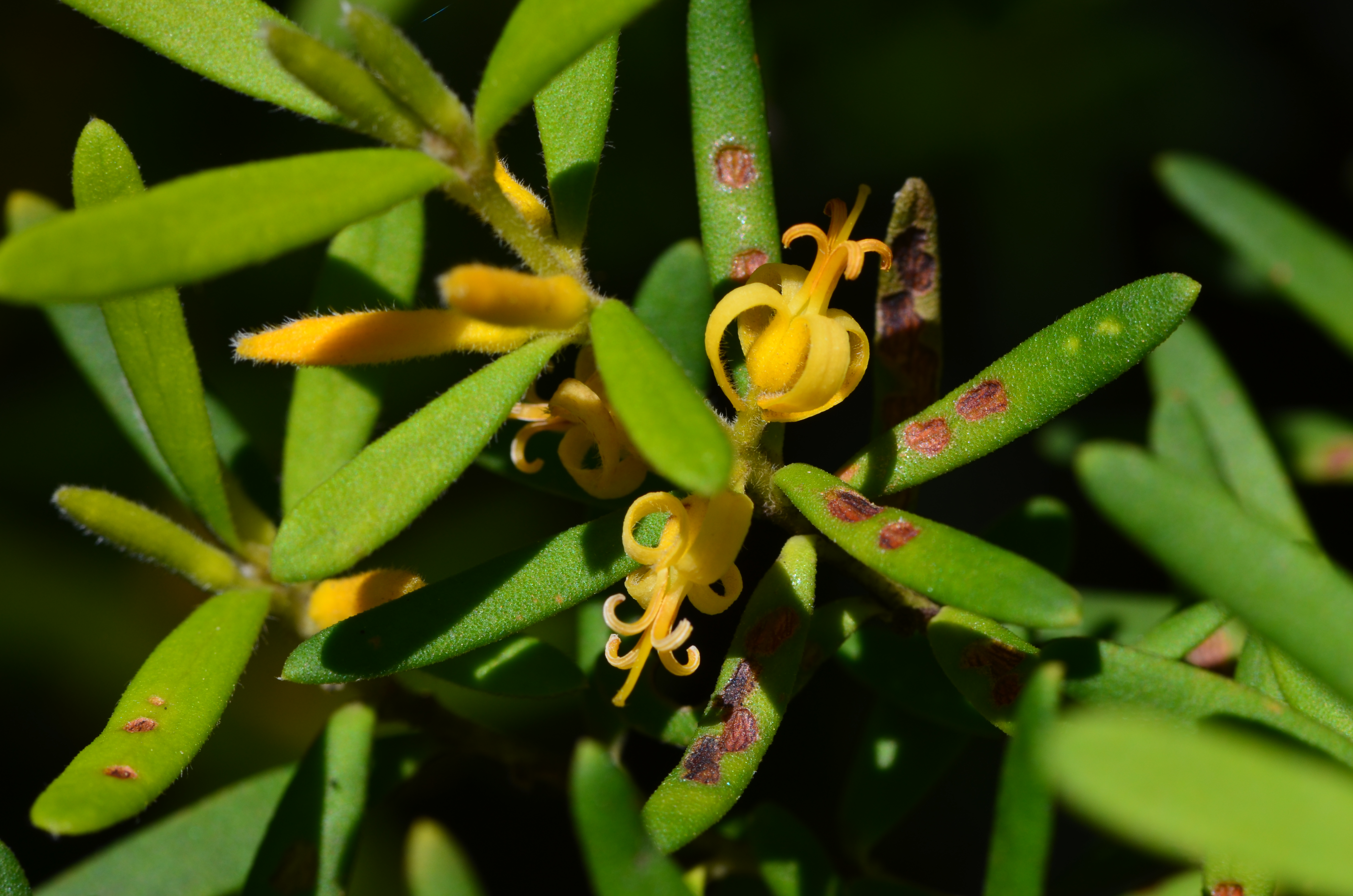
Persoonia sp. (Geebung), Barren Grounds

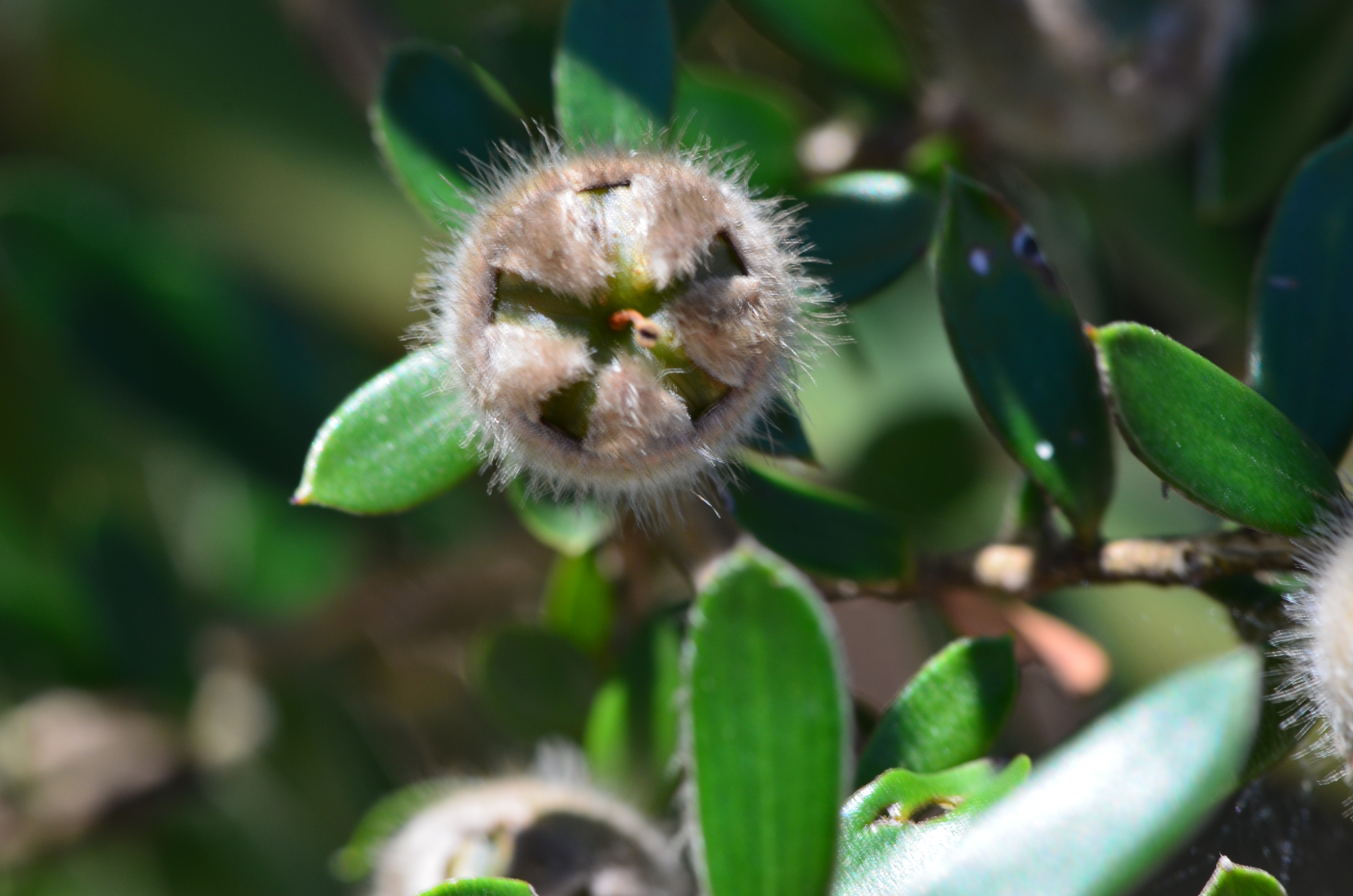
Leptospermum grandifolium, Barren Grounds

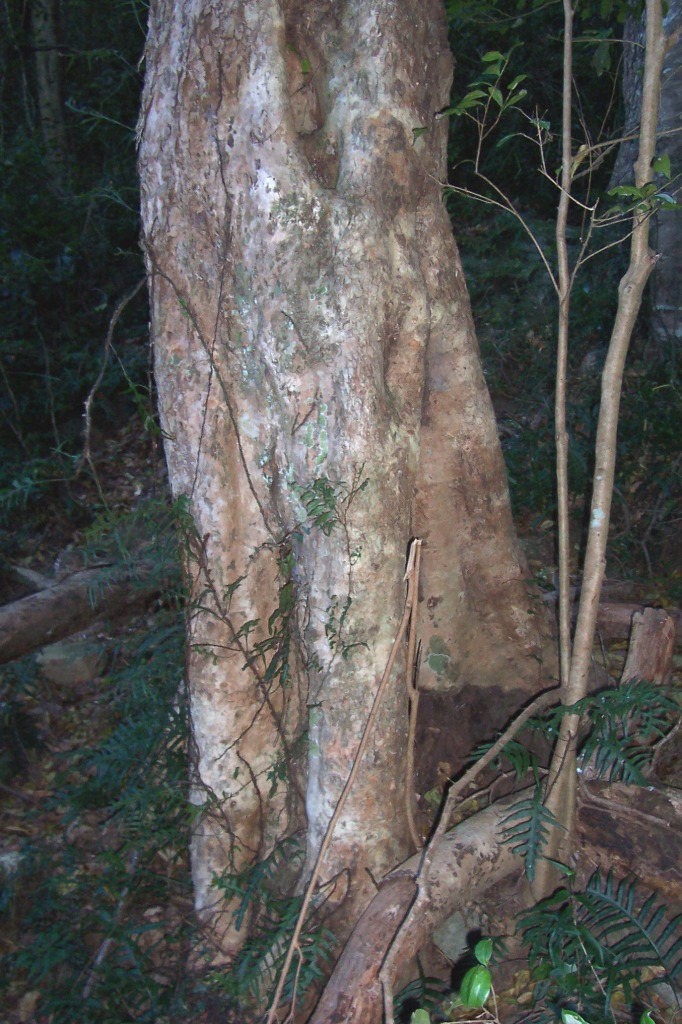
Brush cherry, Mount Keira

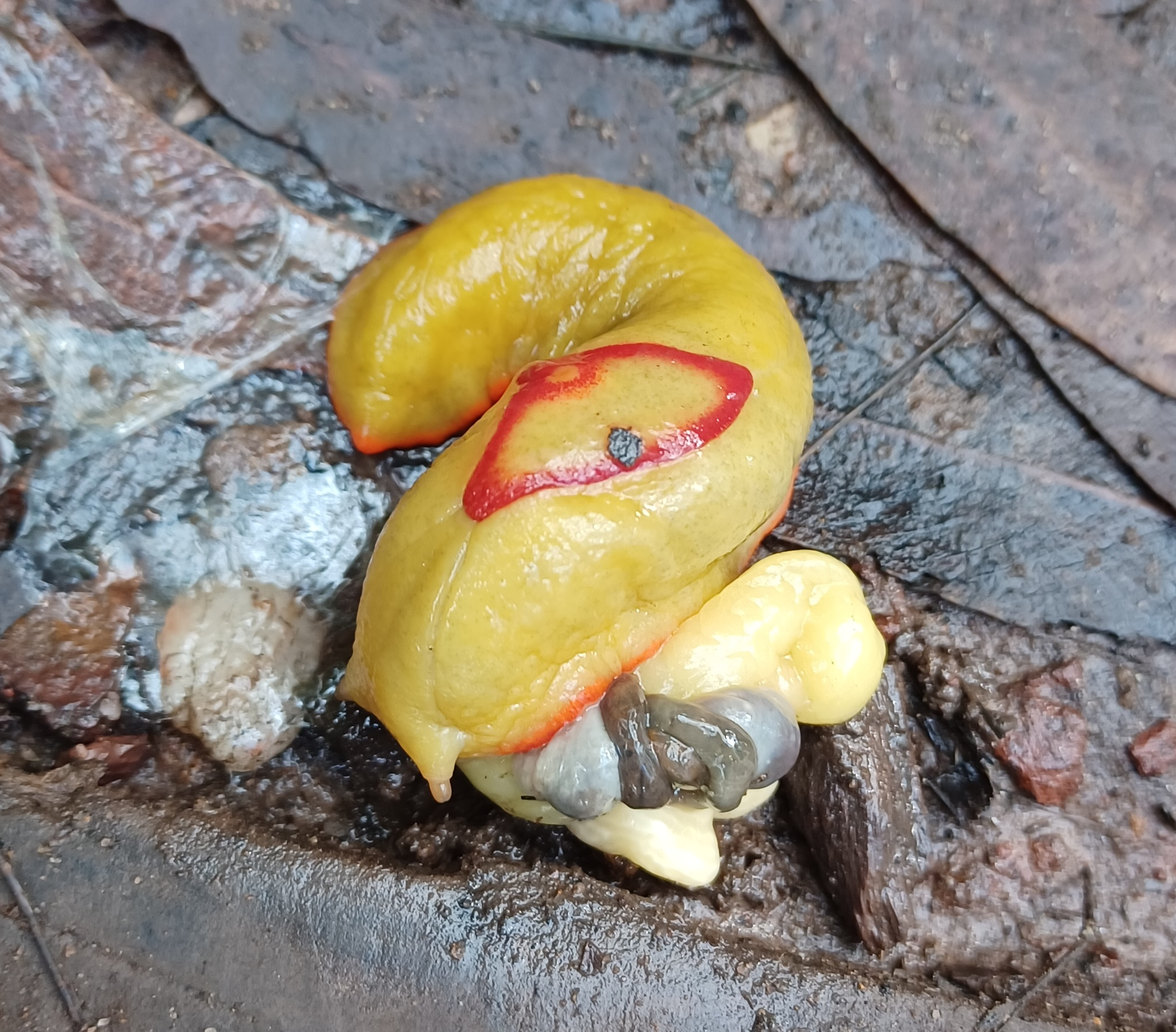
Red triangle slug

The escarpment also contains many historic sites such as mine entrances and passes.

=== Endangered ecological community ===
The escarpment contains the Illawarra Escarpment Subtropical Rainforest (S_RF01) ecological community, which has been declared an endangered ecological community, under the New South Wales TSC Act.

Species listed (taken from "Native Vegetation")

1. Acacia irrorata
2. Acmena smithii
3. Adiantum formosum
4. Alectryon subcinereus
5. Aphanopetalum resinosum
6. Arthropteris tenella
7. Asplenium australasicum
8. Asplenium flabellifolium
9. Baloghia inophylla
10. Ceratopetalum apetalum
11. Cissus antarctica
12. Cissus hypoglauca
13. Claoxylon australe
14. Clematis aristata
15. Clerodendrum tomentosum
16. Coprosma quadrifida
17. Cryptocarya glaucescens
18. Cryptocarya microneura
19. Dendrocnide excelsa
20. Dendroconche scandens
21. Diospyros australis
22. Diploglottis cunninghamii
23. Doodia aspera
24. Doryphora sassafras
24. Elaeodendron australe
25. Eupomatia laurina
26. Eustrephus latifolius
27. Ficus coronata
28. Ficus obliqua
29. Flagellaria indica
30. Gahnia aspera
31. Geitonoplesium cymosum
32. Guioa semiglauca
33. Gymnostachys anceps
34. Hedycarya angustifolia
35. Hymenophyllum cupressiforme
36. Lastreopsis acuminata
37. Leichhardtia flavescens
38. Leichhardtia rostrata
39. Livistona australis
40. Melodinus australis
41. Microsorum pustulatum
42. Morinda jasminoides
43. Myrsine howittiana
44. Notelaea longifolia
47. Palmeria scandens
48. Pandorea pandorana
49. Parapolystichum microsorum subsp. microsorum
50. Parsonsia straminea
51. Pellaea falcata
52. Piper hederaceum var. hederaceum
53. Pisonia umbellifera
54. Pittosporum revolutum
55. Platycerium bifurcatum
56. Polyosma cunninghamii
57. Polyscias murrayi
58. Pouteria australis
59. Psychotria loniceroides
60. Rhodamnia rubescens
61. Ripogonum album
62. Sarcopetalum harveyanum
63. Scolopia braunii
64. Sloanea australis
65. Smilax australis
66. Synoum glandulosum subsp. glandulosum
67. Toona ciliata
68. Trochocarpa laurina
69. Trophis scandens subsp. scandens
70. Viola hederacea
71. Wilkiea huegeliana

== Geography ==
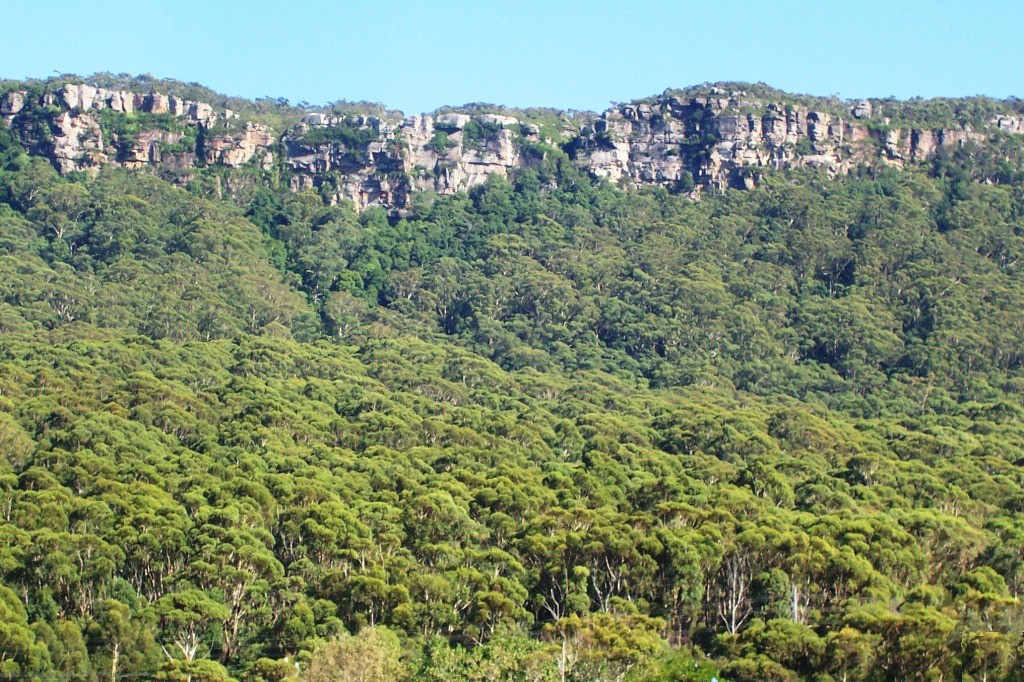
Illawarra Escarpment above Austinmer, showing Hawkesbury sandstone, Rainforest and Eucalyptus forest

Geographically it stretches from the white cliffs of the Royal National Park and its northern hilly ridge formations like Bulgo and Otford Hills and Stony Batter, Undola Ridge and Bald Hill, south past the Otford Valley to the west and around an eroded valley containing Stanwell Park, then it goes south, featuring cliffs and running close to the coastal headlands, approximately 300 metres (1,000 ft) above sea level at Scarborough to the turn at Sublime Point at 415 metres (1,362 ft) near Thirroul, south to Brokers Nose at 440 metres (1,440 ft) promontory, south to Mount Keira, which juts out from the main cliffs, south to a similar eroded sandstone outcrop, Mount Kembla at 534 metres (1,752 ft), then southwest along the Dapto scarp cliffs including Mount Bong Bong to the turn inland at Macquarie Pass, then back east to the promontory at Knights Hill at 709 metres (2,326 ft), south including Jamberoo Mountain and east to Noorinan Mountain promontory at Barren Grounds Plateau, then along a ridge to its southern tip, Saddleback Mountain.

The Cambewarra Range is considered a separate, yet related, geological formation that continues around the Noorinan promontory and continues around Kangaroo Valley.

It ranges in height from the tops of Bald Hill and Stony Batter around 300 metres (980 ft) above sea level, to 440 metres (1,440 ft) at Brokers Nose, generally above 350 metres (1,150 ft) high south of Mount Ousley Road (between Keira and Brokers Nose) it reaches 464 metres (1,522 ft) at Mount Keira, 464 metres (1,522 ft) at Mount Warra, 469 metres (1,539 ft) at Mount Brisbane, 531 metres (1,742 ft) at Mount Burelli, 512 metres (1,680 ft) at Kembla West, 534 metres (1,752 ft) at Mount Kembla, 564 metres (1,850 ft) at Wanyambilli Hill on the plateau to the west and 709 metres (2,326 ft) at Knights Hill, just over 663 metres (2,175 ft) at Noorinan Mountain and about 600 metres (2,000 ft) at Saddleback Mountain.

It is mostly of hard sandstone, with outcrops like Mount Keira and Mount Kembla rising above 450 metres (1,480 ft). There are many tracks to the top of such summits including the southern tip of the escarpment, Saddleback Mountain and Noorinan Mountain promontory. The flora ranges from northern and southern eucalypts and at Mount Kembla fuses, providing an interesting phenomena. The range has much history, including Hoddles Track which used to go to Bowral from Kiama.

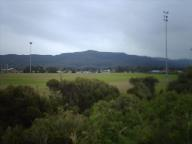
Brokers Nose seen from Fairy Meadow

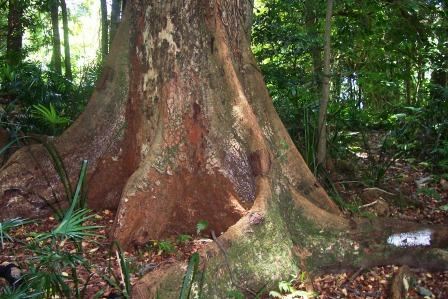
Australian red cedar, Mount Keira, Illawarra

To the north the range is mostly a coastal ridge east of Otford, becoming a cliff at Mount Mitchell, and continuing to include an eroded cliff at its top until Bulli Pass where it becomes rounded, forming Woonona Mountain, until Brokers Nose where the cliff reappears, before appearing again on the edge of Mount Keira and Warra, disappearing until west of Dapto where it forms the famous southern escarpment and curves in for Macquarie Pass National Park and Mount Murray at 768 metres (2,520 ft) before turning into Knights Hill at 709 metres (2,326 ft) and then forming Noorinan promontory, its summit at 663 metres (2,175 ft), and Saddleback Mountains.

=== Passes ===
There are several passes over the escarpment:

- At Bald Hill, where Lawrence Hargrave Drive descends into Stanwell Park;
- At Bulli, where the road goes down from Bulli Pass Lookout near Sublime Point Lookout, around a tight bend and then down into the town of Thirroul;
- At Rixons Pass where the road descends around several tight curves just north of Brokers Nose promontory, and is now a management trail used for mountain biking;
- At Mount Ousley Road, now a freeway, the main route is used for the majority of vehicular traffic and is designed to accommodate slower-moving trucks and buses;
- At Mount Keira Road, built by convict labour and still, in a slightly changed form, used today;
- At O'Briens Road, now partially used by Harry Graham Drive, the Mount Nebo section now a walking and riding track;
- At Cordeaux Road, Mount Kembla, which climbs around Kembla West at 512 metres (1,680 ft), to reach the catchment area to the west;
- At Macquarie Pass, west of Albion Park, protected by a national park; and
- At Jamberoo Mountain Road Pass, east of the mountain of that name, which climbs through a winding pattern to the summit and along the escarpment to Knights Hill and beyond west.
- West of Albion Park is Caloola Pass, passes below Knights Hill and descends to Yellow Rock west of Albion Park, a proposed alternate route to Macquarie Pass, Not used since WWII. Still walkable
- Between Dapto and Albion Park, Johnsons Spur which has not been used since the establishment of Macquarie Pass. Was the main access route from the Illawarra to the Southern Tablelands, now only walkable

Saddleback Mountain Road only reaches the summit after a short, steep, turnoff, but was once part of Hoddles Track, which is now only in existence in a small ridge track from the summit but used to extend west to the Southern Highlands.

=== Protected areas ===
Numerous areas are protected as part of the Illawarra Escarpment State Conservation Area or as state forests such as Kembla State Forest southwest of Wollongong. However, much is private property or owned by mining companies like BHP. Well known and popular lookouts such as at Mount Keira and Bald Hill are reserves or parks, the Mount Keira Summit Park is an annexe of the Wollongong Botanic Garden like Puckeys Estate Reserve on the plain.

=== Walking tracks ===
There are many walking tracks and lookouts with views of the surrounding countryside to the south, or suburbs to the north and coastal villages to the far north, and bushland and suburbs to the north. There are several well-known lookouts, such as Bald Hill, Bulli Pass, Sublime Point and Mount Keira, as well as lesser known tracks with views such as Hoddles Track west of Saddleback Mountain. Some tracks have gone into disrepair such as the Wodi Wodi track at Stanwell Park, but some such as the Mount Keira Ring Track have been upgraded. Weed infestation is a problem, with many areas invaded by lantana and other invasive weeds.

== Maddens Plains ==
Maddens Plains (also written as Madden's Plains) was named after John Madden who arrived from Ireland in 1850 at the age of 11.

The "address locality" of Maddens Plains is defined as a suburb of the City of Wollongong, "about 1 km N of Scarborough and about 7 km E of Southend [trig] Station". At the 2021 census, it had no population. There is a group of telecommunications antennae, including amateur radio repeaters.

== See also ==
- List of escarpments
- List of mountains in Australia § New South Wales
