= Bulli Pass =

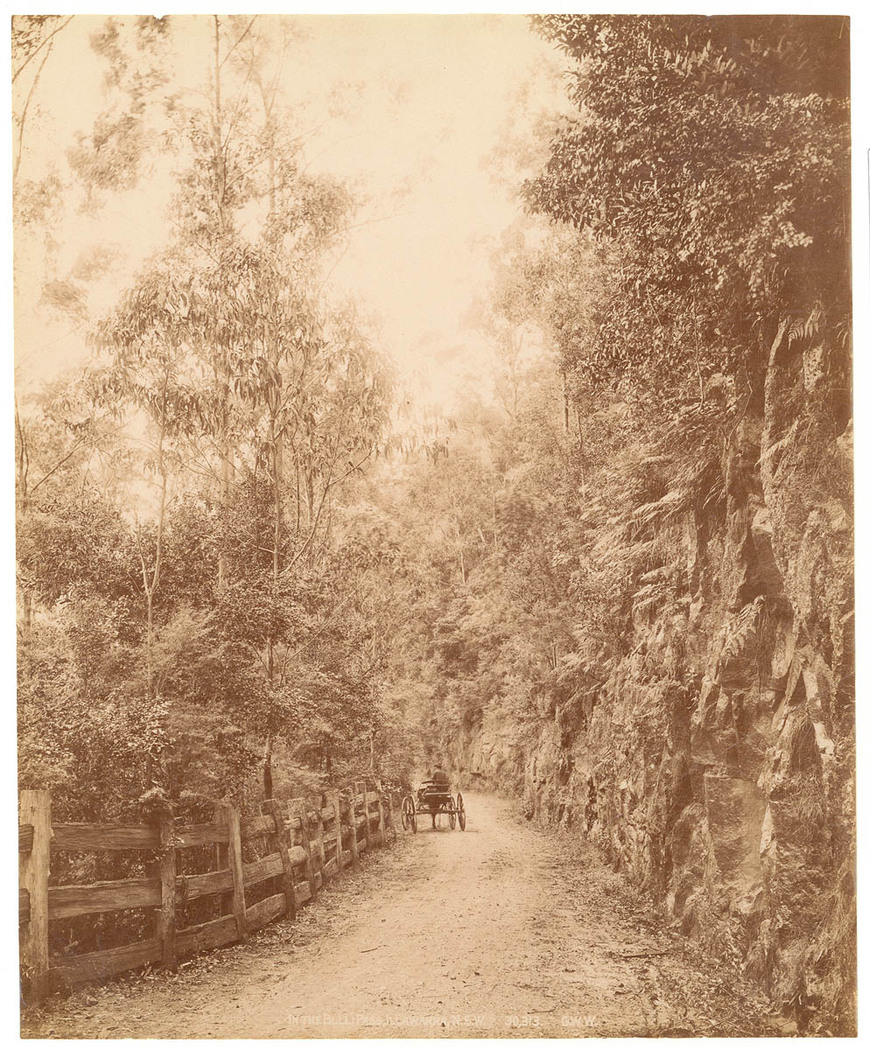
- Horse and cart in the Bulli Pass before it was paved. Source: State Library of New South Wales

- Location within New South Wales
- Elevation: 283 metres (928 ft)
- Traversed by: Princes Highway

Location
- Location: Bulli
- Range: Illawarra escarpment
- Coordinates: 34°19′S 150°54′E

Bulli Pass is a mountain pass with an elevation of 283 metres (928 ft) AHD located northwest of Bulli, New South Wales, Australia. It is situated on the Illawarra escarpment west of the Illawarra coastal plain. It was built during the 19th century for use by loggers and locals transporting goods to and from Sydney. Beforehand sea travel was the only reliable method.

The pass is traversed by the Princes Highway from the Illawarra plain in the south-east to the Woronora Plateau in the north-west, rising over 300 metres (980 ft) in doing so. The pass has a scenic lookout at the top of Bulli Mountain, near Sublime Point Lookout, and this is the sight of the under construction Southern Gateway project. The pass is protected bushland under the Bulli Pass reserve and walking tracks to the lookouts are under repair since 2003.

The pass was the first major route out of the plain, not including Mount Keira Road built in 1834 by convicts or O'Briens Road, a private tollway.

The Bulli Pass is mainly a two lane undivided road with a steep, winding alignment through a geologically constrained area. The pass has steep slopes both above and below the road. The maximum grade on Bulli Pass is 14.6 per cent. In 2014, the average daily traffic volume over the pass was 12,000 vehicles with an annual growth rate of 1.4 per cent. Heavy vehicles account for about five per cent of total vehicle movements over the pass.

In 2008 the pass was subject to a major rock fall that required slope stabilisation works with the Princes Highway closed for seven weeks. Following a serious rock fall in 2015 that landed on a vehicle, there were extensive investigations into the upslope section of Bulli Pass. To ensure the long term safety and stability of Bulli Pass, Roads & Maritime Services closed the road to traffic from October 2016 to December 2016, and again from April to June 2017, to install 1.1 kilometres (0.68 mi) of rock fall protection barrier fencing, from the M1 Princes Motorway to the hairpin bend.

== See also ==
- Lawrence Hargrave Drive
- Princes Highway
- Princes Motorway
