= Illawarra Escarpment State Conservation Area =

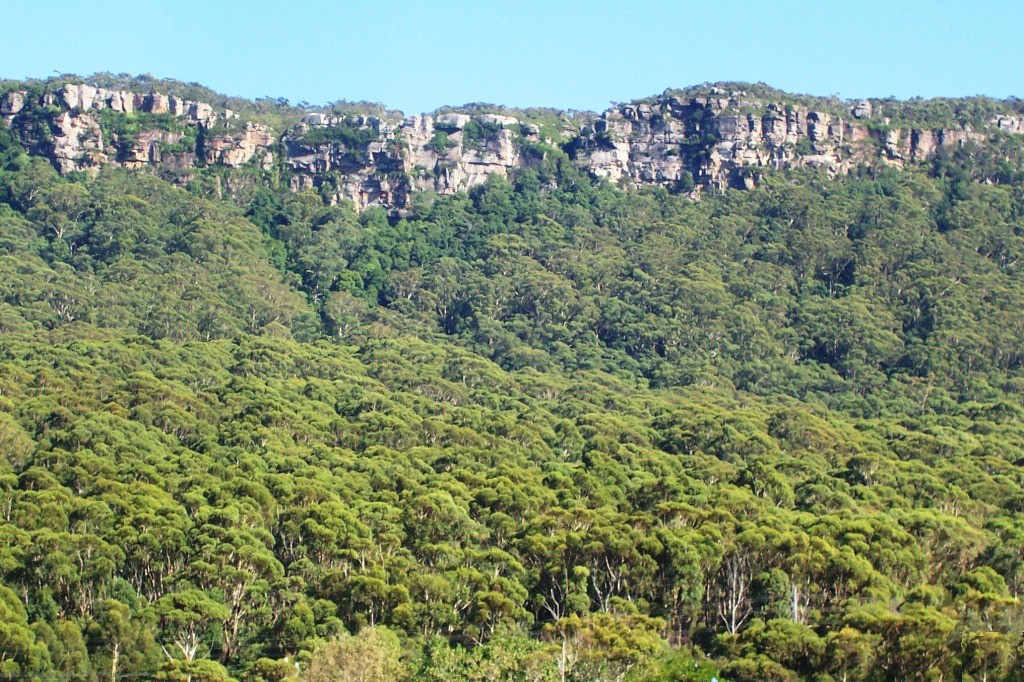
- the escarpment near Austinmer

- Location within New South Wales
- Location: New South Wales
- Nearest city: Wollongong
- Coordinates: 34.296155°S 150.927276°E
- Area: 2,772 ha (10.70 sq mi)
- Established: 1980
- Governing body: NSW National Parks and Wildlife Service
- Website: Official website

The Illawarra Escarpment State Conservation Area is a protected area located west of Wollongong in eastern Australia. The conservation area is a popular location for recreation, including bush walking, scenic viewing, picnicking, camping, bird watching, rock climbing and horse riding. The park comprises six separate sections extending over 40 kilometres, from Stanwell Park in the north to Horsely in the south.

The 30-million-year-old site was inhabited by the Wodi Wodi for 20,000 years, and some of the summits in the region are of spiritual significance for the local Aboriginal people. It also has many colonial roads which were built by Surveyor-General Thomas Mitchell and convicts during 1834.

== See also ==
- Illawarra Escarpment
