= West Wollongong =

- Suburb
- Coordinates: 34°25′S 150°52′E
- Country: Australia
- State: New South Wales
- City: Wollongong
- LGA: Wollongong
- Location: 84 km (52 mi) from Sydney; 2 km (1.2 mi) from Wollongong

Government
  - State electorate: Wollongong
  - Federal division: Cunningham
- Elevation: 45 m (148 ft)

Population
  - Total: 5,223 (2021 census)
- Postcode: 2500
Suburbs around West Wollongong
Mount Keira	Keiraville	Mount Ousley
Figtree	West Wollongong	Wollongong
Figtree	Mangerton	Coniston

West Wollongong is the innermost western suburb of the coastal city of Wollongong, New South Wales, Australia. It is mainly a residential area, serviced by a small commercial strip with a music store, chicken shop, electric goods store and carpet store along the Princes Highway with several petrol stations, two restaurants, a liquor store, a chemist and a flower shop.

Schools in the area include Wollongong West Public School, St Therese Primary School, the Illawarra grammar school, and Edmund Rice College (an all-boys secondary college).

St Marks Anglican Church serves the area of West Wollongong in a variety of ways. The church runs an EFL class (English for Life), Food and friends, Playgroup, Youthgroup, Mother's Union, University Student Housing, Soccer teams' as well as their three services on a Sunday (8am, 10am and 5pm) that cater for a variety of ages including children. The church is open during the week with Saint's Espresso and a playground for people to connect with and to support the community.

It is the location of the Mount Keira Road turnoff from the Princes Highway, incidentally the westernmost end of Crown Street.

Illawarra Institute of TAFE also has a campus at West Wollongong with a focus on Information Technology, Hairdressing, Beauty Therapy, Arts and Media, Fashion Technologies, Meat and Allied Trades. It includes Karoona Gallery.
