= Mount Nebo (New South Wales) =

Mountain in Australia

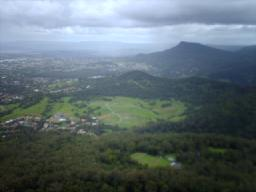
- Mount Nebo in the foreground, seen from Mount Keira. Mount Kembla is visible in the background.

Highest point
- Elevation: 251 m (823 ft)
- Coordinates: 34°25′30″S 150°50′0″E

Geography
- Location within New South Wales
- Location: Illawarra region, New South Wales, Australia
- Parent range: Illawarra Range

Mount Nebo, a tall hill that is part of the Illawarra Range, is located in the foothills of the Illawarra escarpment on the edge of the suburban fringe of the city of Wollongong, New South Wales, Australia. At 251 metres (823 ft) above sea level, the hill is reached by the steep O'Brien's Road from the suburb of Figtree.

== Features and location ==
O'Brien's Road was built as a private toll road in the early 19th century to connect Sydney and the Illawarra. O'Briens Road began at the locally famous fig tree that gave the name to the suburb of Figtree. Views from the top look over Wollongong, Lake Illawarra and the local mountains. Nebo is the Aboriginal name for the hill, and the name was retained as in the case of Woonona Mountain and Mount Warrigal hill at Lake Illawarra.

In 1999 the council stopped vehicles from continuing from the summit due to illegal dumping, and the road has become a track to O'Brien's Gap and Mount Brisbane, at 469 metres (1,539 ft) above sea level. However litter remains a problem.

The hill provides views of Mount Kembla and Mount Keira and is popular for photograph taking. It is connected to the Illawarra escarpment by Nebo Ridge. From the end of the trafficable part of O'Briens Road a short trail climbs to the summit area where, near television re-transmission towers and a water tank. From here the Illawarra Coastal Plain is visible, with the hills of Mount Mangerton, Mount Saint Thomas and Cobblers Hill visible amidst residential areas. To the southeast lies Saddleback Mountain, Noorinan Mountain and Barren Grounds Nature Reserve, Knights Hill, the southern escarpment and, most obviously, Mount Kembla and Kembla West.

The walking and bridle track goes from near the summit (a vegetated area east of the towers), down along Nebo Ridge, which rises to its own summit with views of Mount Keira, Mount Brisbane and the colliery below. A number of species of birds, snakes and plants are found here, as well as the problematic imported deer and Lantana. The track remains fairly consistent except for one section where it climbs very steeply up a 100-metre (330 ft) hill before going along the side of Pupiana, an extension of Mount Brisbane. The track then makes its way past a waterfall, unused water pipes and a gate to Harry Graham Drive, a tourist route along the escarpment. From here it is a short walk to the Motocross Track and the Stafford's Farm Track.

The east and south sides of the hill have been encroached by residential development. The southwest slopes are taken up by agriculture and in the valley to the southwest is the Mount Nebo Colliery in the Kemira valley, the name comes from Mount Kembla and Mount Keira, two prominent local mountains. The track is used as a walking and jogging track and as a birdwatching site. The old road is crumbled in several sections, but this does not stop walkers.

== See also ==
- List of mountains of Australia § New South Wales
