= Sublime Point =

Lady Fuller Park
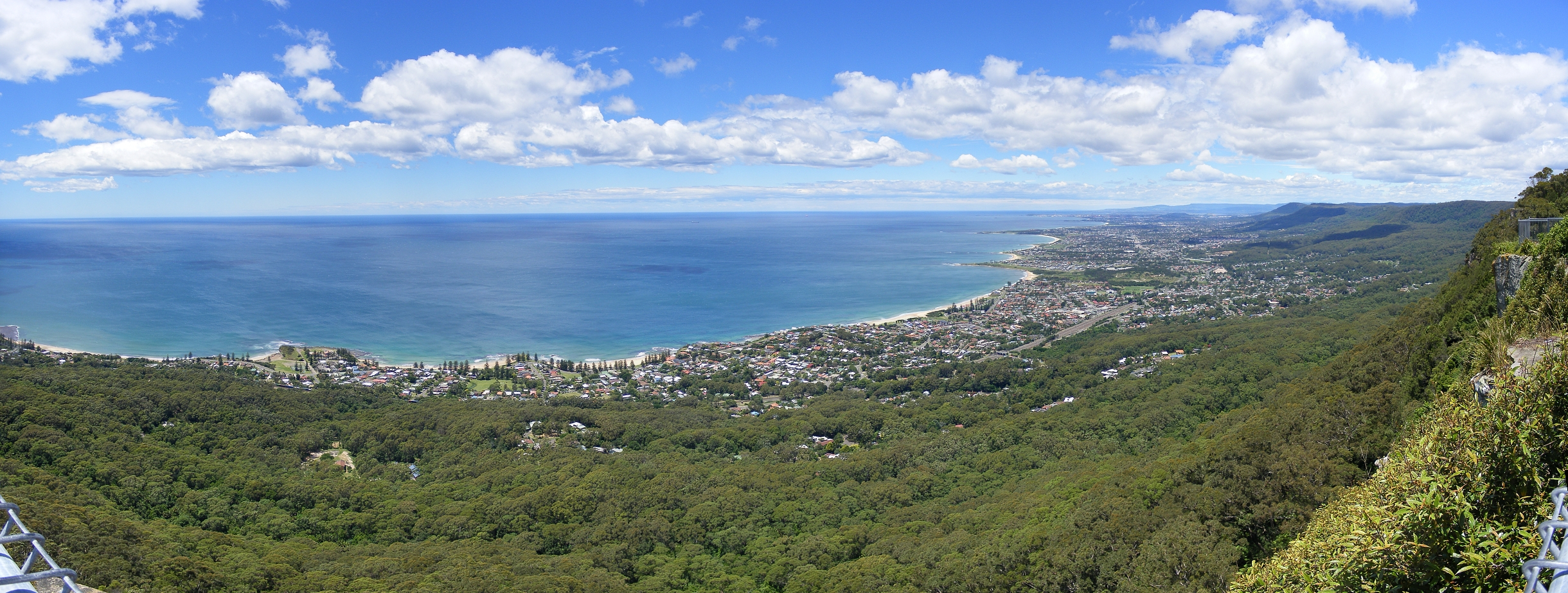
- Panoramic view from Sublime Point overlooking Wollongong
- Interactive map of Lady Fuller Park
- Location: Sublime Point
- Nearest city: Wollongong
- Coordinates: 34.296588°S 150.925327°E

Sublime Point is a feature of the Illawarra Escarpment west of Austinmer in Wollongong, New South Wales, Australia. It is a summit (415m elevation) on the plateau edge where the escarpment turns to go in a more northerly direction from a more northeasterly direction. The surrounding parkland area was proclaimed in 1925 as Lady Fuller Park by the New South Wales Government.

The summit has a cafe and lookout and is visited regularly. Sublime Point Lookout may be reached by road from the Princes Highway above Austinmer, or by a walking track from Austinmer and Thirroul.

The name also applies to several less well known geographical features in Australia, including one in the Blue Mountains, and several places across the world.
