= Mount Keira =

- Suburb
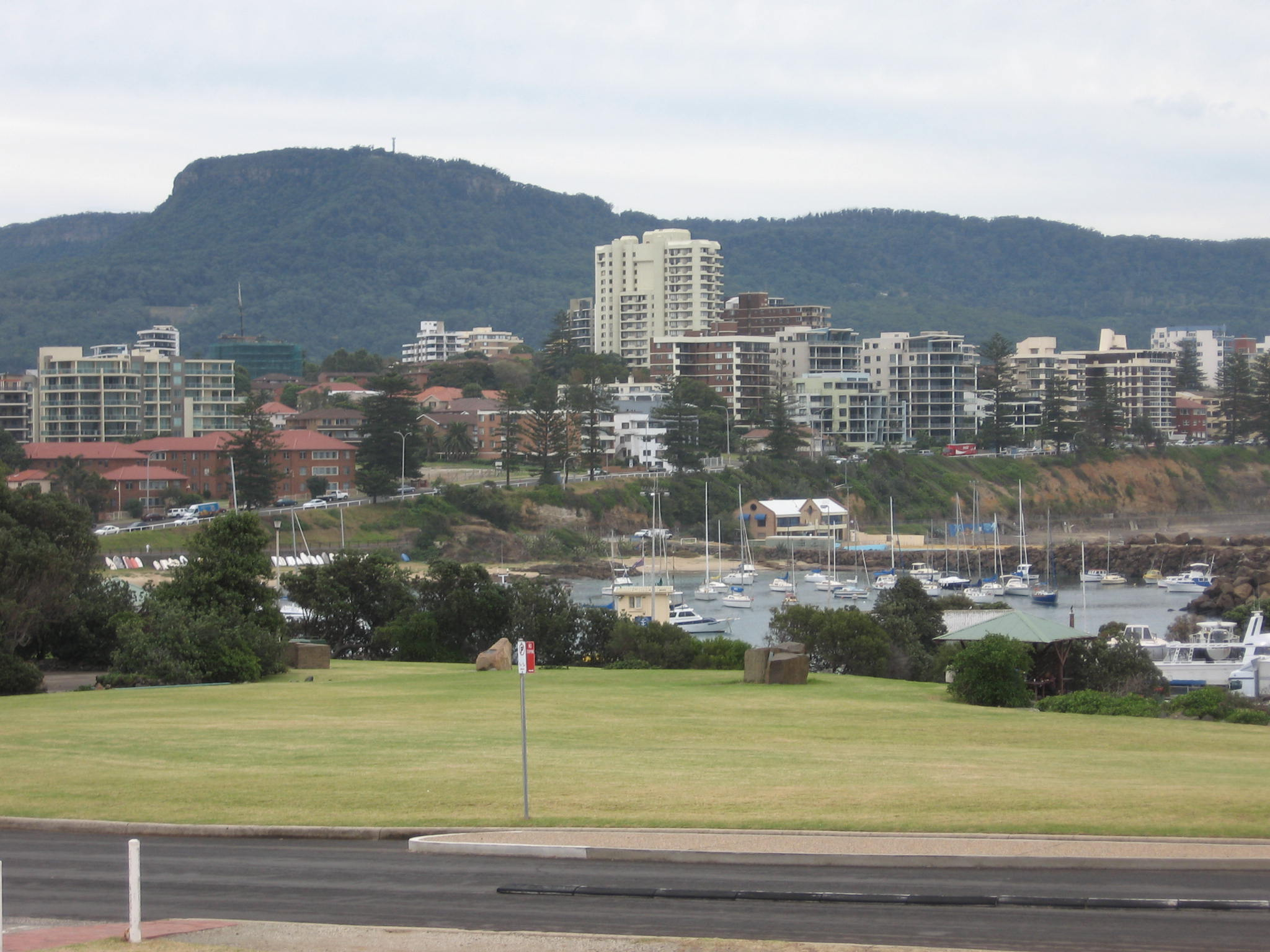
- Overlooking Wollongong Harbour and North Wollongong to Mount Keira
- Coordinates: 34°24′26″S 150°51′09″E
- Country: Australia
- State: New South Wales
- City: Wollongong
- LGA: City of Wollongong
- Location: 80 km (50 mi) from Sydney; 10 km (6.2 mi) from Wollongong

Government
  - State electorate: Keira
  - Federal division: Cunningham
- Elevation: 463.9 m (1,522 ft)

Population
  - Total: 1,691 (2021 census)
- Postcode: 2500
Suburbs around Mount Keira
	Balgownie, Mount Pleasant	Mount Ousley
	Mount Keira	Keiraville
Mount Kembla	Figtree	North Wollongong

Mount Keira
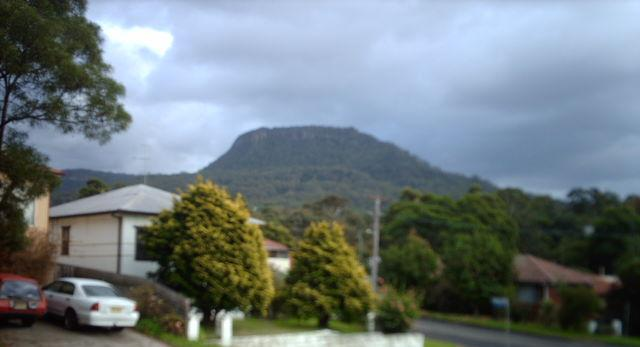
- Mount Keira seen from Keiraville

Highest point
- Elevation: 464 m (1,522 ft)
- Coordinates: 34°24′S 150°51′E

Geography
- Location within New South Wales
- Location: Illawarra region, New South Wales, Australia

Mount Keira (/ˈkɪərə/ KEER-ə) is a suburb and mountain in the Illawarra region of New South Wales, Australia.

Mount Keira is a site of significant cultural heritage for the Wodi Wodi people. The name derives from the Wodi Wodi name for the mountain, Geera or Djera. The first maps of the area called it Keera, later adding the "i". Mount Keira forms a part of the Illawarra escarpment, all of which is sacred land to the Wodi Wodi people of the wider Dharawal language group.

The suburb of Mount Keira, a semi-rural township of Wollongong, is located on the mountain's summit and southern flank.

The summit of Mount Keira has an elevation of 464 metres (1,522 ft) above sea level and is located 4 kilometres (2.5 mi) northwest of the city of Wollongong. Its distinctive shape and proximity to Wollongong make it a major local landmark. It is noted for the views of the city from the popular summit lookout and its history of coal mining. It was formed as part of the Illawarra escarpment fold between 80 and 60 million years ago and the erosion by creeks that ensued.

== Indigenous significance and history ==
Mount Keira is located on the traditional lands of the Wodi Wodi people, who form a part of the larger Dharawal language group. Archeological evidence shows Dharawal people have occupied the Illawarra for at least 30,000 years. Patterns of use have been recorded in oral histories, physical features and written records.

=== The story of Mount Keira and the Five Islands ===
According to the Alcheringa, the Dreaming of the local Aboriginal peoples, Mount Keira is Geera, the daughter of Oola-boola-woo, the west wind. The story of the creation of Mount Keira is tied to the creation of the Five Islands, which sit just off the Wollongong coast. In the story, Oola-boola-woo had six daughters, Mimosa, Wilga, Lilli Pilli, Wattle, Clematis and Geera. They lived a-top the Illawarra escarpment, and one by one the first five children misbehaved, raising the ire of Oola-boola-woo, who cast them and the stone beneath them out to sea, forming the Five Islands. Geera, who was now the only child left on their escarpment home, had no one to play with and no one to talk to, as her father was often away. Geera spent all day sitting, hunched over and watching the camps of the local Aboriginal people and looking out to sea to her five sisters. Eventually, she turned to stone, dust and leaves building up around her until she became a part of the escarpment. She is known today as Mount Keira.

=== Education ===
Mount Keira has been recognised as one of the most significant educational resources and teaching sites to the Dharawal people of the Illawarra region. Today, this is reflected in some of the major educational institutions of the Illawarra including the University of Wollongong, Wollongong TAFE, Wollongong High School and Keira High School sitting in the shadow of Mount Keira. Mount Keira demonstration school is a small public school that lies at the base of the mountain.

=== Indigenous perspectives on future development ===
Mount Keira has been described as the Uluru of the Illawarra, due to its deep cultural significance. There are currently plans for Mount Keira to be further developed for adventure tourism. These plans for further development have caused some contention in the Indigenous community, who want to ensure the site is respected as a place of spiritual and historical importance.

== Geographic description ==
Mount Keira forms part of the Illawarra escarpment, which it joins by a high saddle on the back (western) side. It is capped by a westward-sloping plateau of relatively hard sandstone ringed on the remaining three sides by cliffs. From the cliff base the mountain slopes down to the surrounding foothills and coastal plain. From Wollongong, the mountain looks rather flat-topped; from the north it appears part of the escarpment.

The majority of the mountain is forested with eucalypt (sclerophyll) forest and sub-tropical rainforest, while civilisation encroaches on the lower slope regions. Surrounding suburbs are (from north to south): Balgownie, Mount Pleasant; Mount Ousley; Keiraville; West Wollongong; Figtree and Mount Kembla.

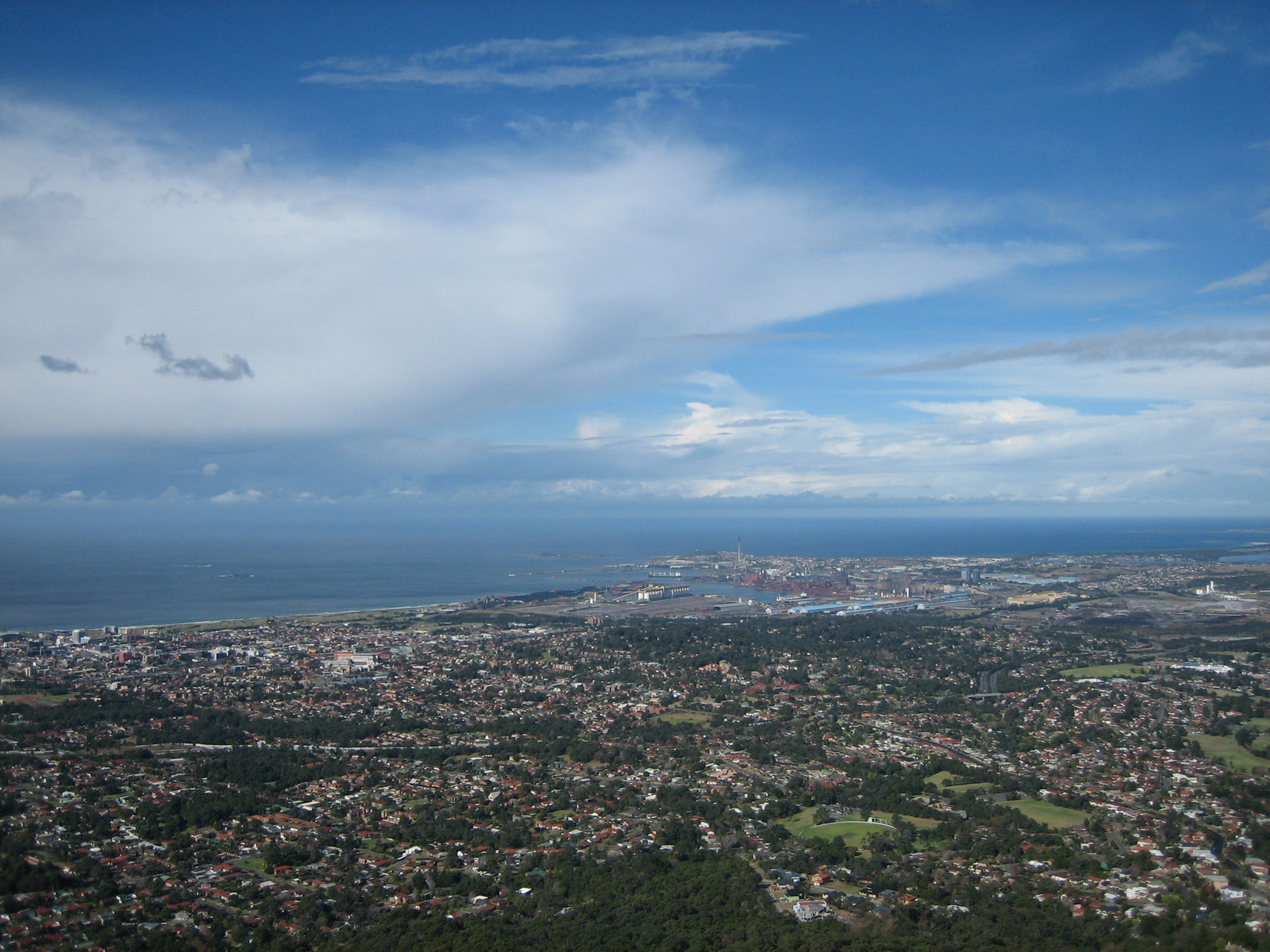
View from the peak of Mount Keira facing Wollongong city

The mountain is drained by several creeks, and has many gullies on its slopes such as the ones present on the ring track and the one directly south of the mountain known as Hell Hole after an axe murder by a convict who dispatched a labourer known as Old Tom in Byarong Creek. The south and western slopes are drained by Byarong Creek, which flows west of Byarong Park before descending to Figtree and then to the sea. The eastern slopes are drained by creeks that flow into Para or Fairy Creek, which flows through the Wollongong Botanic Gardens before arriving at Fairy Lagoon at Puckeys Estate Reserve. The northern slopes are drained by Cabbage Tree Creek.

Mount Ousley Road climbs up the northern spur and over the escarpment and is the major road link between Wollongong and Sydney. On the road is the small suburb of Mount Pleasant. At Mount Pleasant is the Illawarra Rhododendron Park, located on Parrish Avenue near the start of the Mount Pleasant Track. It contains thousands of azaleas and hundreds of rhododendrons as well as camellias. A section of rainforest is located in the top section with short walking trails. The park covers 13 hectares (32 acres).

On the southern side, Mount Keira Road leaves suburbia and winds its way through the bush up the back of the mountain, giving access to the (now closed) Kemira coal mine, Byarong park, Girl Guides camp, Scout camp, and ultimately the summit lookout via Queen Elizabeth Drive. The Scout camp was established in 1939 by Sid Hoskins and later described by Lady Baden Powell (wife of Lord Baden Powell, the founder of Scouting) as "surely one of the most beautiful campsites in the world". Mount Keira Road was built using convict labour in 1835–1836, surveyed by Surveyor General Thomas Mitchell, using much of the route used by O'Briens Road but descending the south and west slopes of Mount Keira rather than Mount Nebo, a nearby hill to Mount Keira's south. Byarong Park was originally a pit pony grazing area, the ponies were stabled at the site of the Girl Guide camp.

=== Summit lookout ===
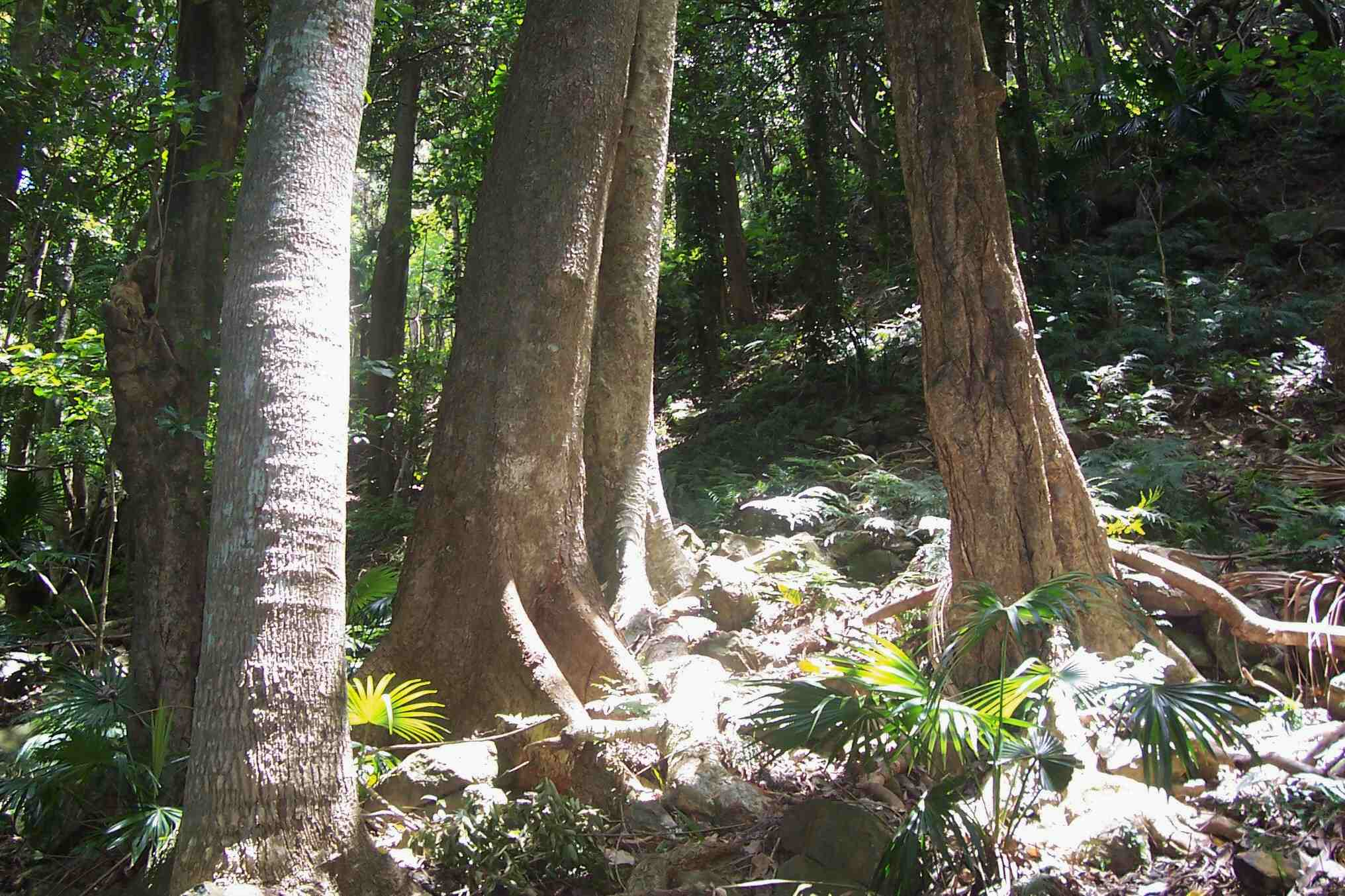
Sub tropical rainforest at Mount Keira including red cedar, flame tree and maiden's blush

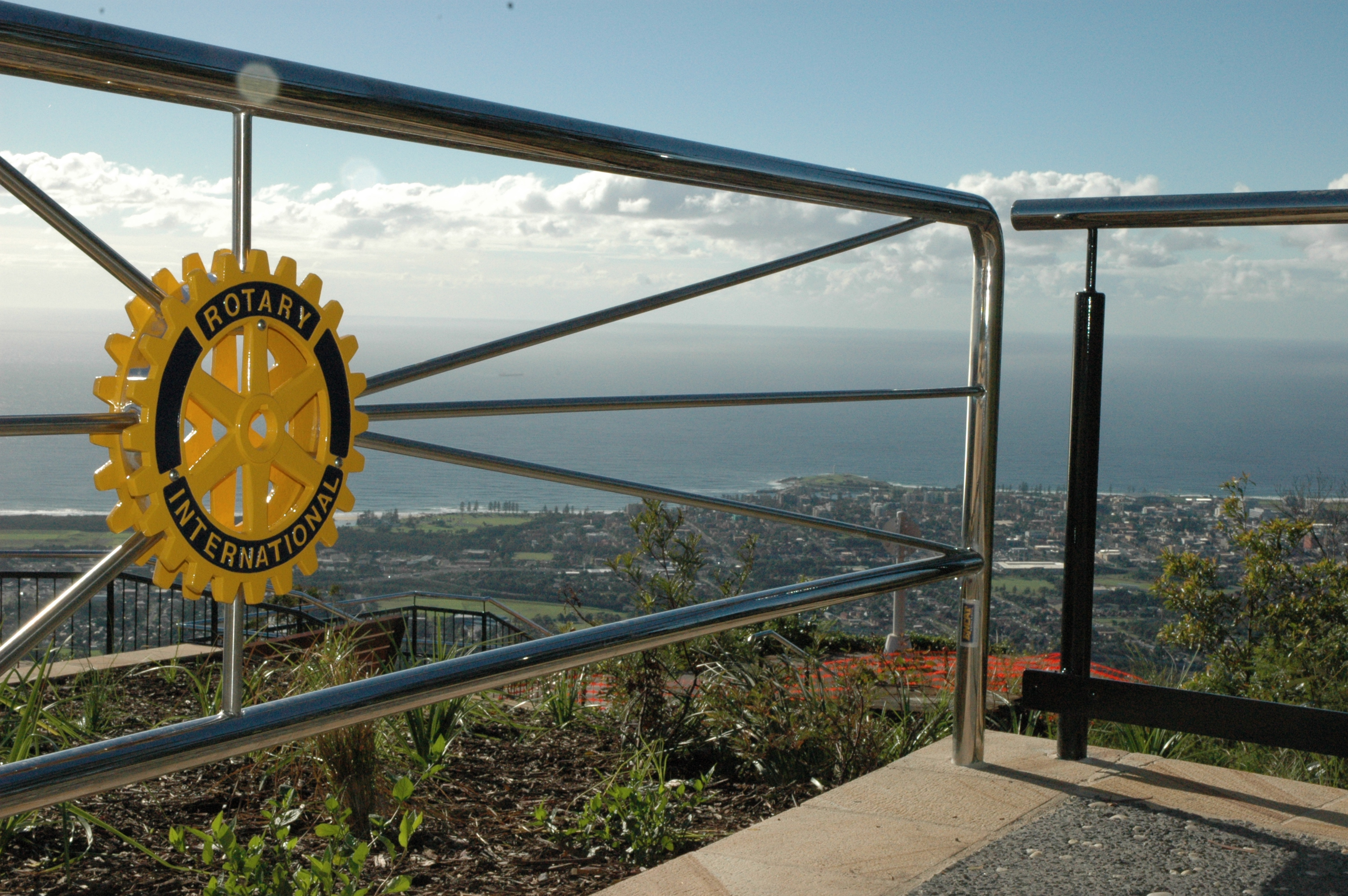
Mount Keira Summit Park, a project of the Rotary Club of Wollongong

In 1955 the Rotary Club of Wollongong, with the support of local government and businesses, constructed the summit lookout. In 2005, the Summit Park refurbishment provided an opening up of vistas of the coastal plain from Kiama to Sydney, and is managed as an annexe of the Wollongong Botanic Garden. It contains 9.4 hectares of land and it is a major tourist destination, many visitors to Wollongong climbing the Ken Ausburn Track.

As well as overlooking Wollongong, the summit provides views from the Kurnell Refinery 53 kilometres (33 mi) north to the northern headland of Jervis Bay, 64 kilometres (40 mi) south, as well as the Blue Mountains to the far west and out to sea to the east for 77 kilometres (48 mi). On a good day it is easy to see the northern escarpment and, from the Victoria Rock Lookout, reached by a short trail or cliff track, one can see Knights Hill, Mount Kembla and Saddleback Mountain clearly. Summit facilities include car parking spaces, toilets, picnic areas with wooden tables and benches, and a kiosk/restaurant, the Mountaintop. An early man to climb the mountain of note was botanist Allan Cunningham.

At the summit is the Mountaintop Restaurant, used for food, drink and function purposes. Just west of it by a few metres is the transmission tower, visible easily from the plain and a local landmark. The new larger tower was built by Telstra with the ownership reverting to Wollongong City Council on completion. There was a campaign to paint it green so it would blend with the summit plateau canopy but this failed and it remains grey.

In 2006 binocular telescopes were fitted, and after several tests, vandalism and malfunctioning being a problem, they are currently in use for "gold coin" donation to the Rotary club. With these it is possible to see places like Stanwell Park in the distance and Brokers Nose trigonometric station.

The summit lookout and Queen Elizabeth Drive was officially opened in 1959, but attempts to secure land from Australian Iron & Steel began in 1954. Both a map and plaque remain from the original lookout park design, though the previous hang-gliding ramp has been taken down for the new observation walkways.

== Flora and fauna ==
Eucalypt forest and rainforest cover the mountain summit and undeveloped slopes. Rainforest is predominant in sheltered areas, particularly on the southern side.

The mountain has been heavily logged in the past, yielding blackbutt, blue gum, turpentine and other timbers. Red cedar, in particular, was highly prized and there are stories of giant trees with trunk diameters of 3 metres (9.8 ft) or more being felled. Remnant bushland on the west and north slopes and a few trees defying extensive logging still exist, but much of the east slopes are replaced bushland grown after clearing since the 1930s.

Plant species found on the mountain include:

- Cabbage tree palm (Livistona australis)
- Coast white box (Eucalyptus quadrangulata)
- Giant stinging tree (Dendrocnide excelsa)
- Native tamarind (Diploglottis australis)
- Red cedar (Toona australis)
- Sassafras (Doryphora sassafras)
- Turpentine (Syncarpia glomulifera)
- Citronella (Citronella moorei)
- Jackwood (Cryptocarya glaucescens)
- Bollygum (Litsea reticulata)

Introduced weeds such as lantana (Lantana camara) have also gained a hold on the mountain, particularly since the 1968 bushfires.

The forests provide habitat for a large number of bird and other fauna species.

Notable fauna species include:

- Echidna (Tachyglossus aculeatus)
- Eastern blue-tongued lizard (Tiliqua scincoides scincoides)
- Superb lyrebird (Menura novaehollandiae)
- Wallaby

There is also a population of introduced rusa deer residing on and around the mountain, which are often seen by local residents at dusk or dawn.

== Walking tracks ==
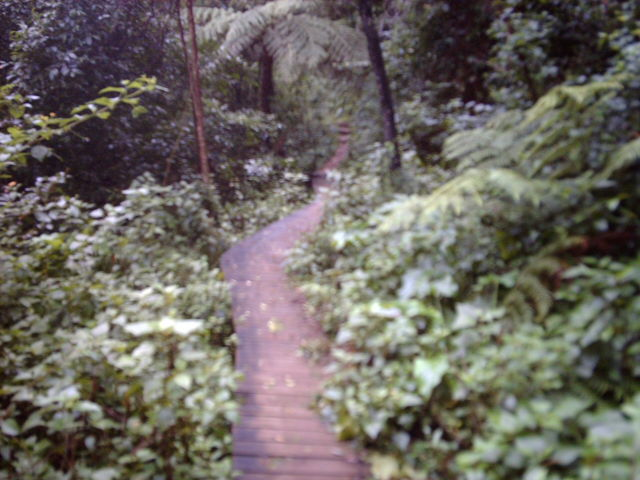
Ring Track

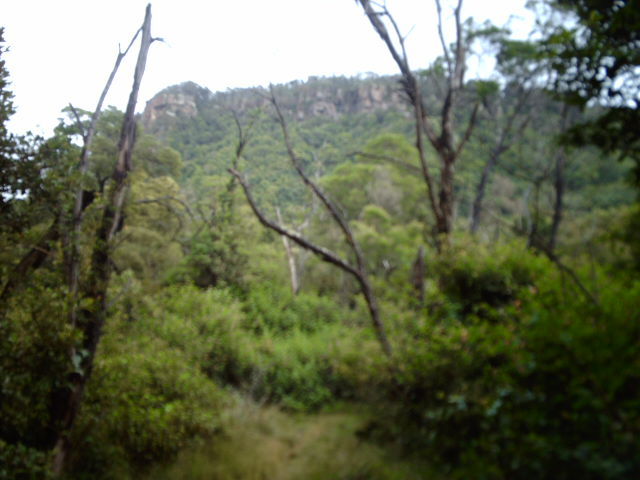
East summit plateau cliff seen from Ring Track

The Mount Keira Ring Track provides walkers with a moderate 5.5-kilometre (3.4 mi) (3–5-hour) round trip. The Ring Track encircles the mountain at an average height of 250 metres. The walk can be commenced from a number of locations, including Mount Keira summit, Byarong Park, the Scout Camp and Queen Elizabeth Drive. The Ring Track can also be joined from the Mount Pleasant Track, which starts from Parrish Avenue. From Byarong Park, a picnic area with parking and an information bay, access to the Ring Track is via a short link track that runs from the northern perimeter of the picnic area to the entrance of the Girl Guide Camp road. The link track crosses the Guide Camp road and then ascends a short distance through rainforest, before joining the Ring Track. From the junction, two branches of the Ring Track ascend the mountain. The left branch gently climbs the southern flank of Mount Keira, following Mitchells Road to a saddle located at the junction of Mount Keira Road and Queen Elizabeth Drive. The right branch traverses the mountain's eastern flank, before emerging at Geordies Flat on Mount Keira Road. From Geordies Flat, the northern branch of the Ring Track climbs steadily to the junction of Mount Keira Road and Queen Elizabeth Drive. At this point, walkers can also join the Robertsons Lookout track, a 1.2-kilometre (0.75 mi) walk that terminates at a viewpoint that takes in the Scout Camp, Mount Keira and the Illawarra coast. At Geordies Flat, a vehicle width trail leads north to Parrish avenue. Walkers combine this trail with the Ring Track and the Mount Pleasant walking track to complete a loop walk.

Highlights of the Ring Track are rainforest and many species of unique Australian animals, including wallabies, lyrebirds, brush turkeys, echidnas. Lyrebirds are common on the southern slopes. Rain forests have a mostly open understorey, consisting of ferns and low shrubs. Weeds such as lantana are evident where the natural environment has been disturbed. Eucalyptus forests thrive where the rain forests have been cleared but even here rainforest plants typically dominate the understorey.

Walkers can climb from the Ring Track's southern branch to Mount Keira summit via the Dave Walsh Track, which joins the Ring Track opposite the Scout Camp Road, or from the northern branch via a branch track that emerges about halfway along Queen Elizabeth Drive. At the summit, the Dave Walsh track emerges at Five Islands Lookout. A short 200-metre (660 ft) track leads to the summit park, where there is parking, toilets and a café. With care, walkers using the short northern link to Queen Elizabeth Drive can turn left when they reach the road and walk along the road to the summit. Walkers need to exercise great caution when walking along Queen Elizabeth Road because the road is narrow and steep with blind corners that limit visibility of both cars and walkers. From Mount Keira summit, fine views of Warra to the south and Brokers Nose Promontory to the north can be seen.

The track surface is variable. On the southern and eastern flanks, the track is reasonably well formed and the gradients are relatively steady. The northern branch is steeper and more rugged. The northern flank contains some particularly magnificent rain forests. The southern section of the track follows an early convict built road on Mount Keira, some of which is still visible. A similar feature, an early attempt to construct a carriageway, is visible west of the summit track on Mount Kembla. Also on the southern flank there is also an old telegraph camp site. The Ring Track is a locally well known and is popular with joggers, walkers and school groups. The track was rebuilt after it was damaged in 1998 by severe storms.

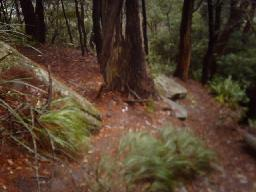
Dave Walsh Track

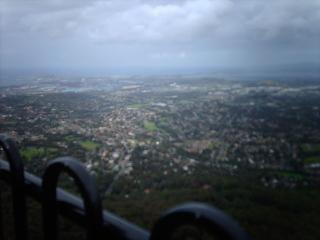
View from Five Islands Lookout

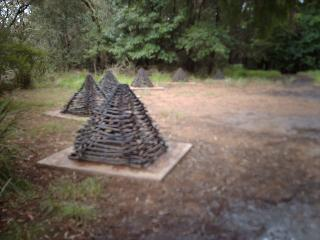
Sculpture at Five Islands Lookout

The Dave Walsh Track, named after a Scout leader, climbs from Mount Keira Road opposite the Scout Camp road through a small open area of ground ferns, up the western slope of Mount Keira, to Five Islands Lookout and the Summit Track. At the Mount Keira summit, it can also be reached via a maintenance trail that leads from the carpark in Summit Park. The tree growth is mainly Eucalyptus, ground plants including Lomandra longifolia and maidenhair fern. Wallabies, lizards, snakes and many forms of bird and insects live in the area.

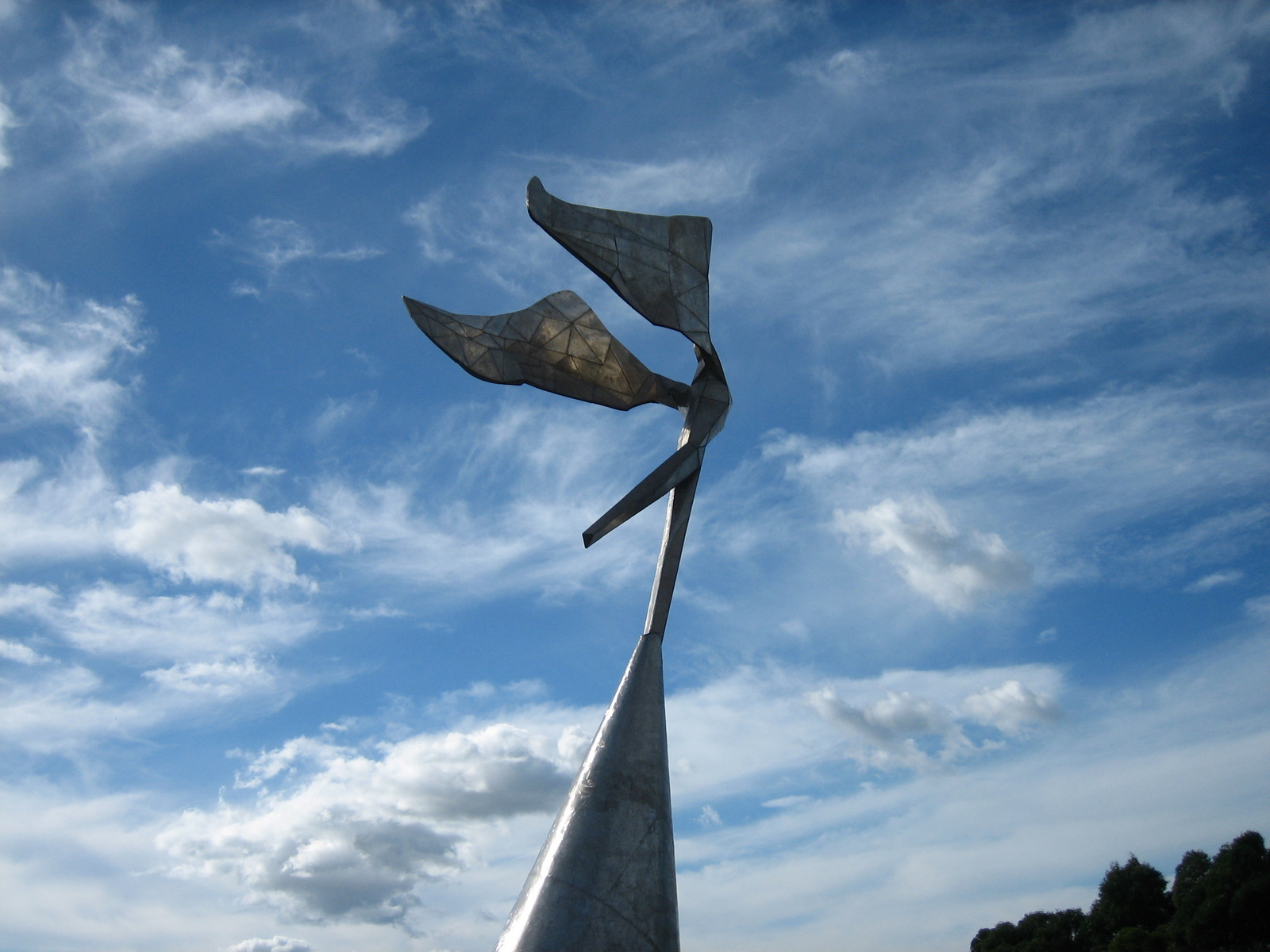
Lawrence Hargrave Sculpture, located near the base of Mount Keira

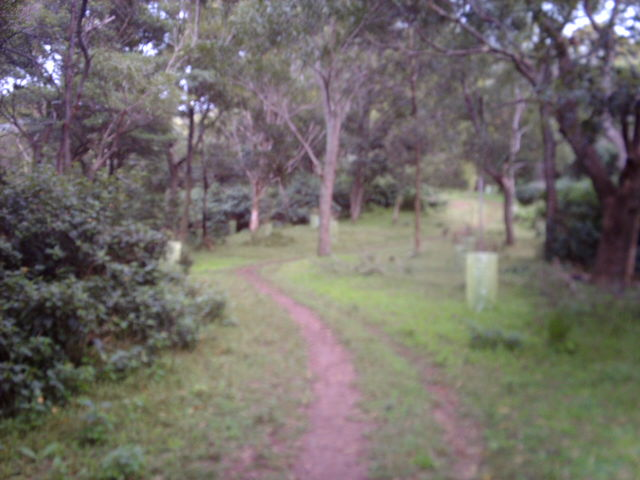
Ken Ausburn Track

The Ken Ausburn Track begins at the end of Northfields Avenue (near the University of Wollongong and Wollongong Botanic Garden). It climbs up a steep grass path and turns into a section of wooden steps and a boardwalk. At the top of the steps is a plaque indicating several bird species to be found on the track. Near this is a lemon tree. The track follows a level path to an open grass area where it reaches the Lawrence Hargrave Memorial Sculpture, situated in an open grass area. The sculpture was made from 1988 to 1989 by Herbert "Bert" Flugelman, and is of stainless steel and part of the University of Wollongong Art Collection.

After this the track gradually climbs a ridge until it reaches the Northern Illawarra Lookout, which gives views to the north and has a plaque telling of the shipwreck at Towradgi Point. From here it continues through a cutting, with a plaque indicating the cutting is a survivor from the Mount Keira Tramway opened in 1859. The track goes up some more wooden steps and reaches a brick airshaft completed in 1907 used to ventilate the Kemira Colliery, and a plaque tells of the mine's history. From here the track goes for a short distance before reaching the Mount Pleasant Management Trail, and then to the northeastern entrance to the Ring Track, at Geordies Flat on Mount Keira Road. The track is popular with joggers and tourists, and has many plaques indicating various sights such as a remaining grey ironbark left from extensive logging in the late 19th century and several plants such as the invasive weed Lantana camara and the native settlers flax.

The Mount Pleasant Track is 750 metres (2,460 ft) long. It extends between Parrish Avenue at Mount Pleasant and Mount Keira Road. By car, Parrish Avenue is reached by turning left off Mount Ousley Road (immediately before the Mount Pleasant road overpass bridge, driving southbound), and then right onto the overpass bridge. The track climbs the middle slopes of Mount Keira via dense rainforest. From Parrish Avenue, the walk steeply ascends a 3-metre (9.8 ft) wide trail for about 300 metres (980 ft) before narrowing to less than 1 metre (3 ft 3 in). The final 500 metres (1,600 ft) wind through the rainforest, which contains many ferns, vines and palms. Large boulders are evidence of previous rockfalls from the sandstone plateau, which forms the escarpment cliffs and Mount Keira summit. Over the last 350 metres (1,150 ft) the gradient decreases until it reaches the Ring Track. About 100 metres (330 ft) north of the track-head at Parrish avenue are the Illawarra Rhododendron Gardens. The Gardens are lush, quiet and pleasantly cool in most seasons. Walkers can complete a loop back to Parrish Avenue by turning left onto the Ring Track and left again onto the Mount Pleasant Management Trail at Geordies Flat.

The Mount Pleasant Management Trail is a trail used for walking and mountain bike riding, bicycles being permitted only on management trails and not on walking tracks in the Illawarra Escarpment State Conservation Area. The trail travels between the suburb of Mount Pleasant and Mount Keira Road, where it emerges at the hairpin bend (Geordies Flat). The trail is 2 to 3 metres (7 to 10 ft) wide. From Mount Pleasant the trail ascends steadily to its junction with the Ken Ausburn Track, which is located on the walker's left (east side of the trail). From here ascends a steep hill before levelling out to Mount Keira Road. Near the entrance to the Ken Ausburn track, views of Wollongong can be had. From Mount Pleasant good views of the northern cliff face can be seen. Birdwatching is an activity on this track, for many species can easily be seen including lyrebirds.

The Keira Summit Track skirts the edge of the Mount Keira cliff line. It links the Queen Victoria Lookout and Five Islands Lookout. The track forms a 600-metre (2,000 ft) loop when combined with a management trail that leads between the Five Islands lookout and the summit car park. The track goes through thick bush at the eastern clifftop and includes Sleber's Mint Bush, Lomandra grasses and many native flowering plants.

== Mining history ==
Coal was recorded at Mount Keira in 1839 by the William Branwhite Clarke, a qualified geologist.

In 1848 James Shoobert, a retired sea captain, drove a tunnel into what is now known as the No. 3 (Wongawilli) seam. He then observed an outcrop of the No. 2 (Balgownie or 4-ft) seam, in which the coal was of better quality, and drove tunnels into it in 1849 and 1850. This was known as the Albert Coal Mine and was the first in the Illawarra. Shoobert lacked the capital to develop the mine and in 1856 sold it by auction to Henry Osborne. In April 1857 a new tunnel was opened into the higher No 1 (Bulli) seam a short distance away by William Robson for Osborne and called the Osborne Wallsend Colliery. On 16 April 1857 the first 3.5 long tons (3.6 t) of coal from the new mine was delivered to the wharf at Wollongong's Belmore Basin by bullock team for trial in SS Illawarra. Keira coal gained a reputation for being superior to any other coal, and by the 1870s large shipments were being made to Sydney, India and parts of Asia.

Coal was originally forked into approximately 1-long-ton (1.0 t) capacity wooden skips, hauled to the surface by horse and then carted down the mountain by a track joining Mount Keira Road near Hurt Street. Later improvements include a main and tail rope haulage installation to bring coal to the surface, and a self-acting skip incline (that is, empty skips hauled up to the mine by the descending loaded skips) to transport the coal to the foot of the mountain at what is now Gooyong Street Keiraville.

In May 1861 a narrow-gauge tramway was constructed from the incline to Belmore Basin (Wollongong Harbour) after the Mount Keira Tramways Act was passed by parliament. In 1878 the tramroad was widened to standard gauge and horse teams used for hauling the coal were replaced by steam locomotives. These locomotives, the Keira No. 1 and Keira No. 2, were the first locomotives to work on this coal route but steam locomotives were earlier used at Bulli Colliery from 1867 – even though the first Bulli locomotive purchased proved too heavy for the track, which had previously been designed for an ingenious gravitational coal-skip incline to the jetty over four cuttings and four bridges. The locomotives at Keira ceased running in 1954 when the line was closed.

On a modern street map the route of the tramway followed Gooyong Street, Rose Street, Throsby Drive (Tramway Bridge) and then between Campbell Street and Smith Street (including the Illawarra Master Builders Club carpark) to Osborne Park and Belmore Basin. The route can still be traced on a modern aerial or satellite photograph. In 1937 Australian Iron & Steel (later a subsidiary of BHP) acquired the colliery for its Port Kembla steelworks. In 1942 a diesel locomotive was introduced at the mine, the first underground diesel locomotive in Australia.

In 1954 the skipway and tramway were replaced by a tunnel driven from the escarpment at the head of the company's private railway between Mount Nebo and Mount Kembla. In 1955 the mine was renamed Kemira (from Kembla and Keira). Longwall mining was introduced in the 1960s. Peak production was reached in the year ending November 1979 with 770,684 tonnes (758,512 long tons). In 1982 a downturn in the steel industry resulted in 189 employees (60% of the workforce) being retrenched, resulting in a 16-day "sit-in" protest by 30, and mining finally ceased on 27 September 1991.

== See also ==
- List of mountains of Australia § New South Wales
