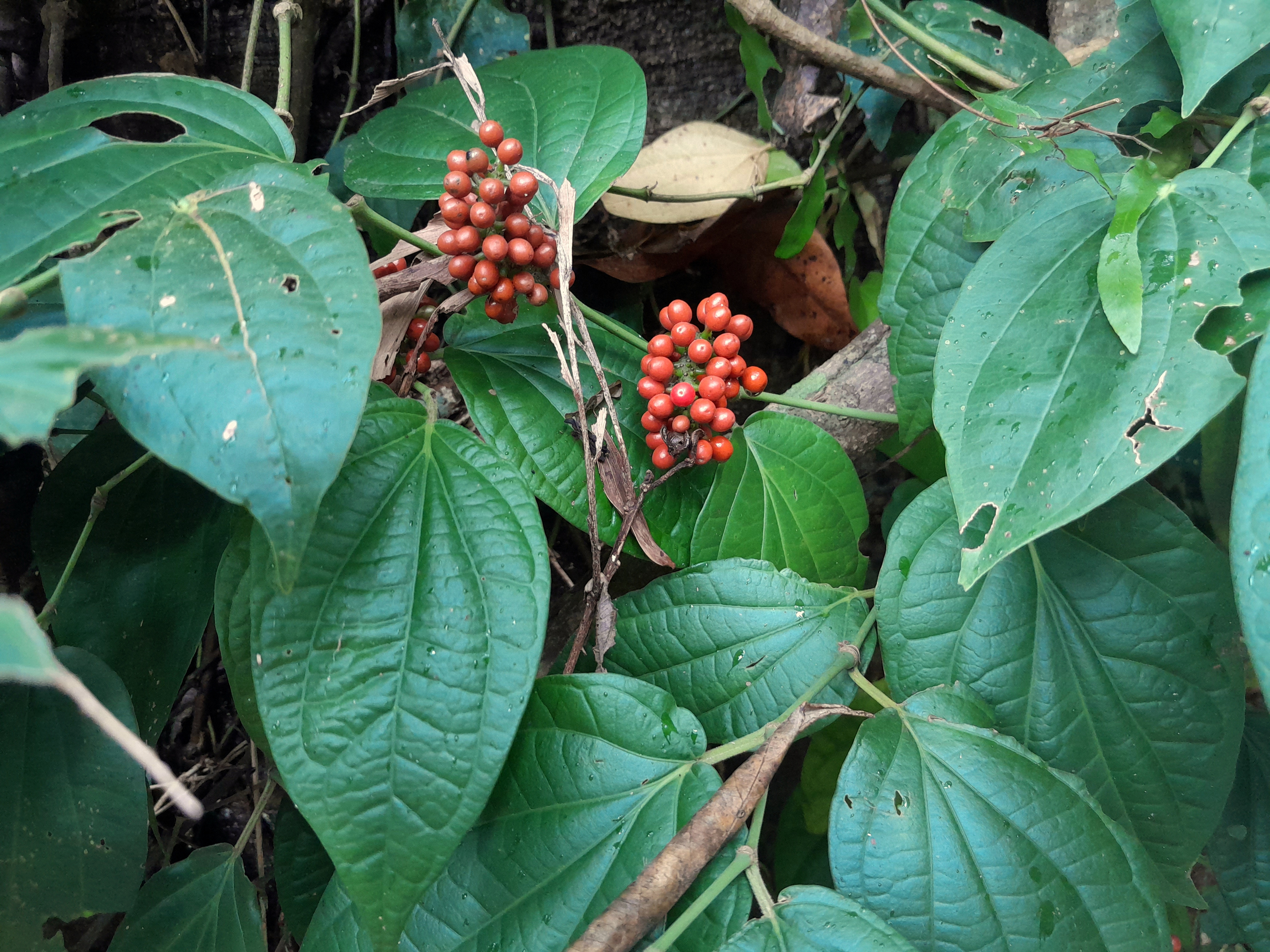
- In fruit at the Cairns Botanic Gardens, December 2022

Conservation status
- Least Concern (NCA)

Scientific classification
- Kingdom: Plantae
- Clade: Tracheophytes
- Clade: Angiosperms
- Clade: Magnoliids
- Order: Piperales
- Family: Piperaceae
- Genus: Piper
- Species: P. hederaceum

Binomial name
- Piper hederaceum (Miq.) C.DC.

Synonyms
- Cubeba hederacea Miq.

= Piper hederaceum =

Giant pepper vine

Species of flowering plant

Piper hederaceum, commonly known as the giant pepper vine, is a species of plants in the pepper family Piperaceae. It is a twining climber with a stem diameter up to 15 cm (5.9 in) which is endemic to eastern Australia, found from Lockhart River, Queensland, to Bermagui, New South Wales. It inhabits tropical, subtropical and temperate rainforest at altitudes from sea level to about 1,200 m (3,900 ft).

== Taxonomy ==
This species was first described as Cubeba hederacea in 1845 by Dutch botanist Friedrich Anton Wilhelm Miquel, who published his description in The London Journal of Botany. It was subsequently transferred to Piper hederaceum in 1869 by the Swiss botanist Anne Casimir Pyramus de Candolle, writing in the book Prodromus Systematis Naturalis Regni Vegetabilis.

=== Infraspecies ===
Two varieties are recognised:

- Piper hederaceum var. hederaceum
- Piper hederaceum var. longiorispicum

== Conservation ==
This species is listed as least concern under the Queensland Government's Nature Conservation Act. As of January 2025, it has not been assessed by the International Union for Conservation of Nature (IUCN).

== Gallery ==
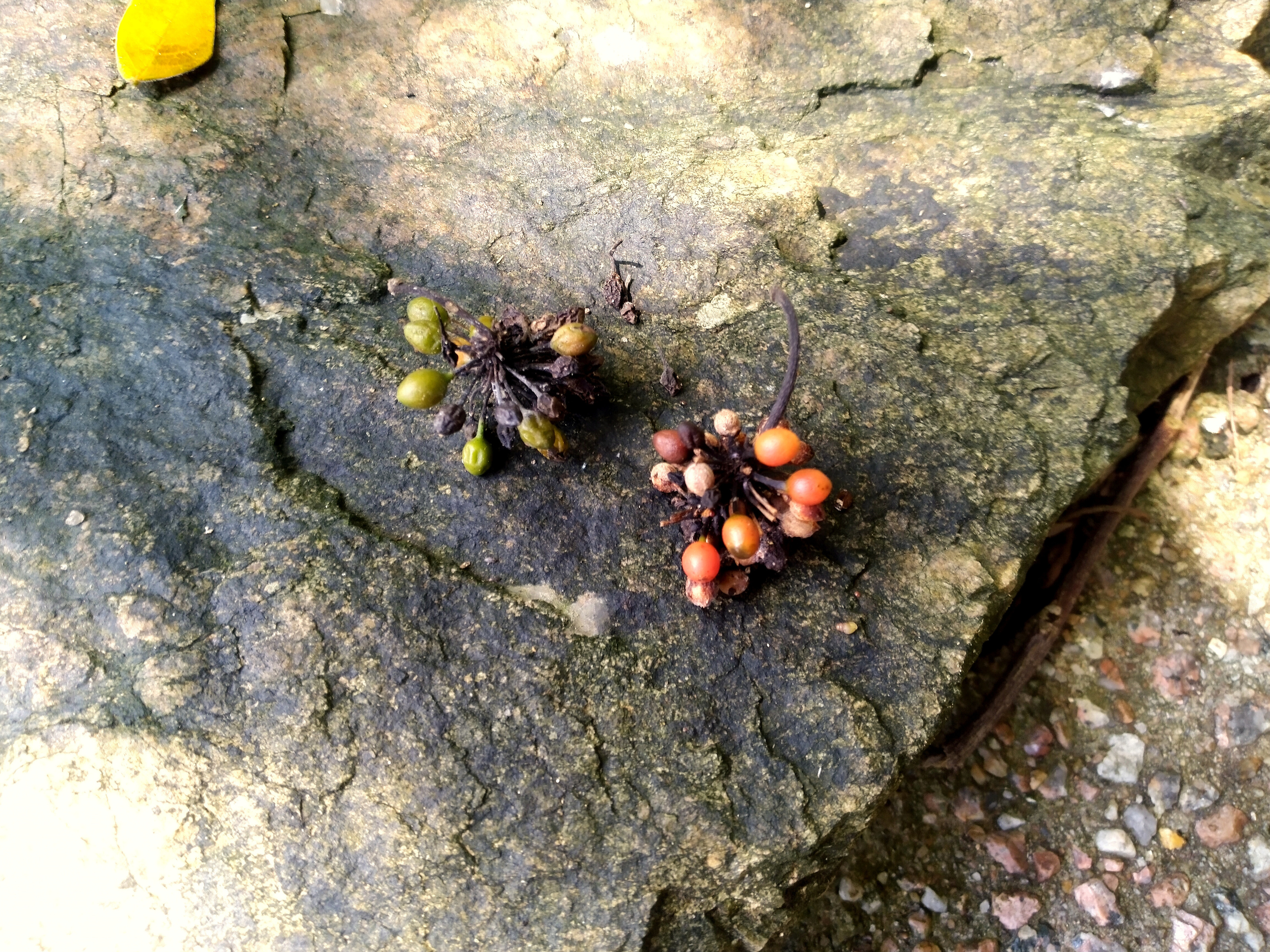

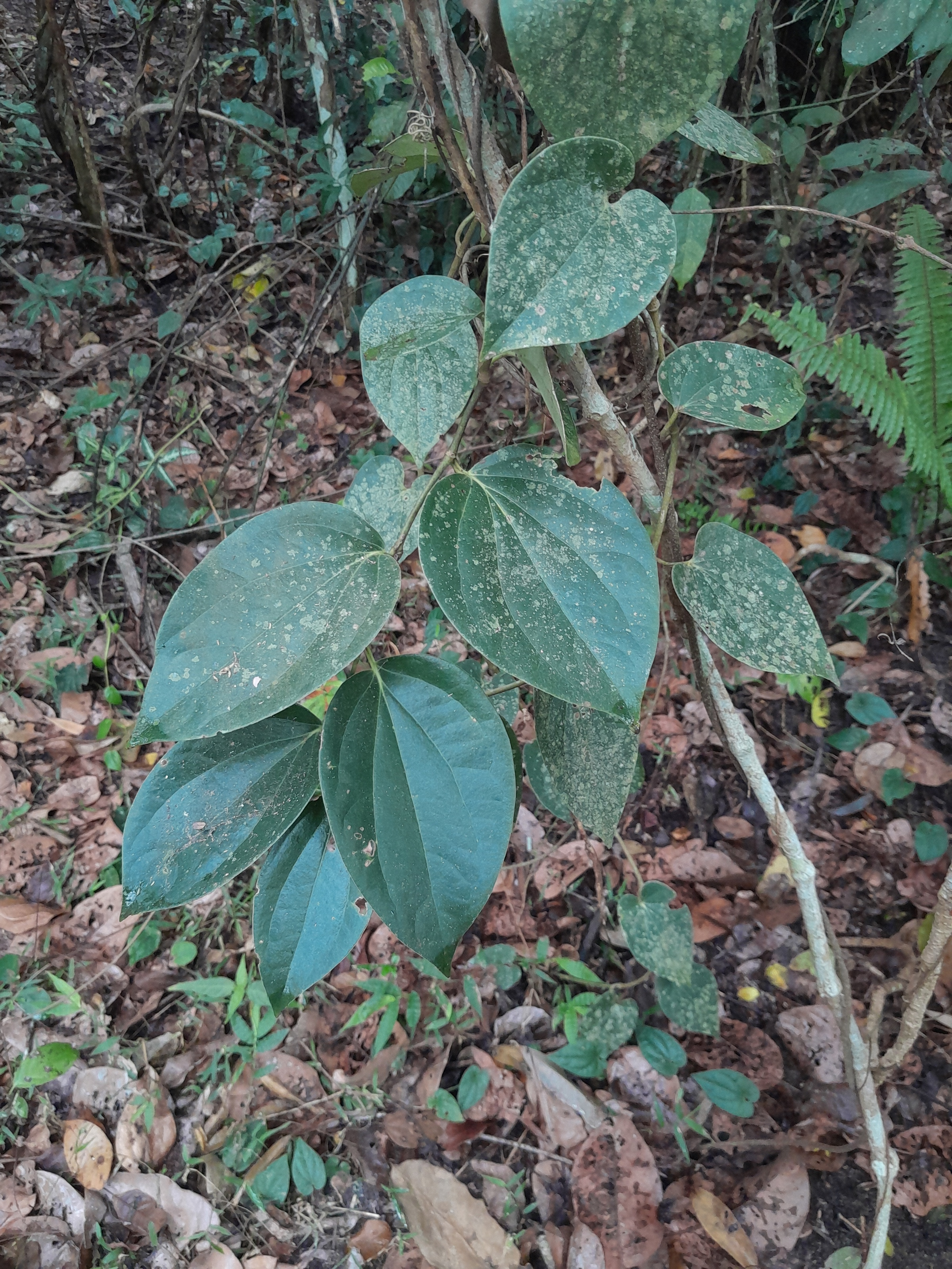

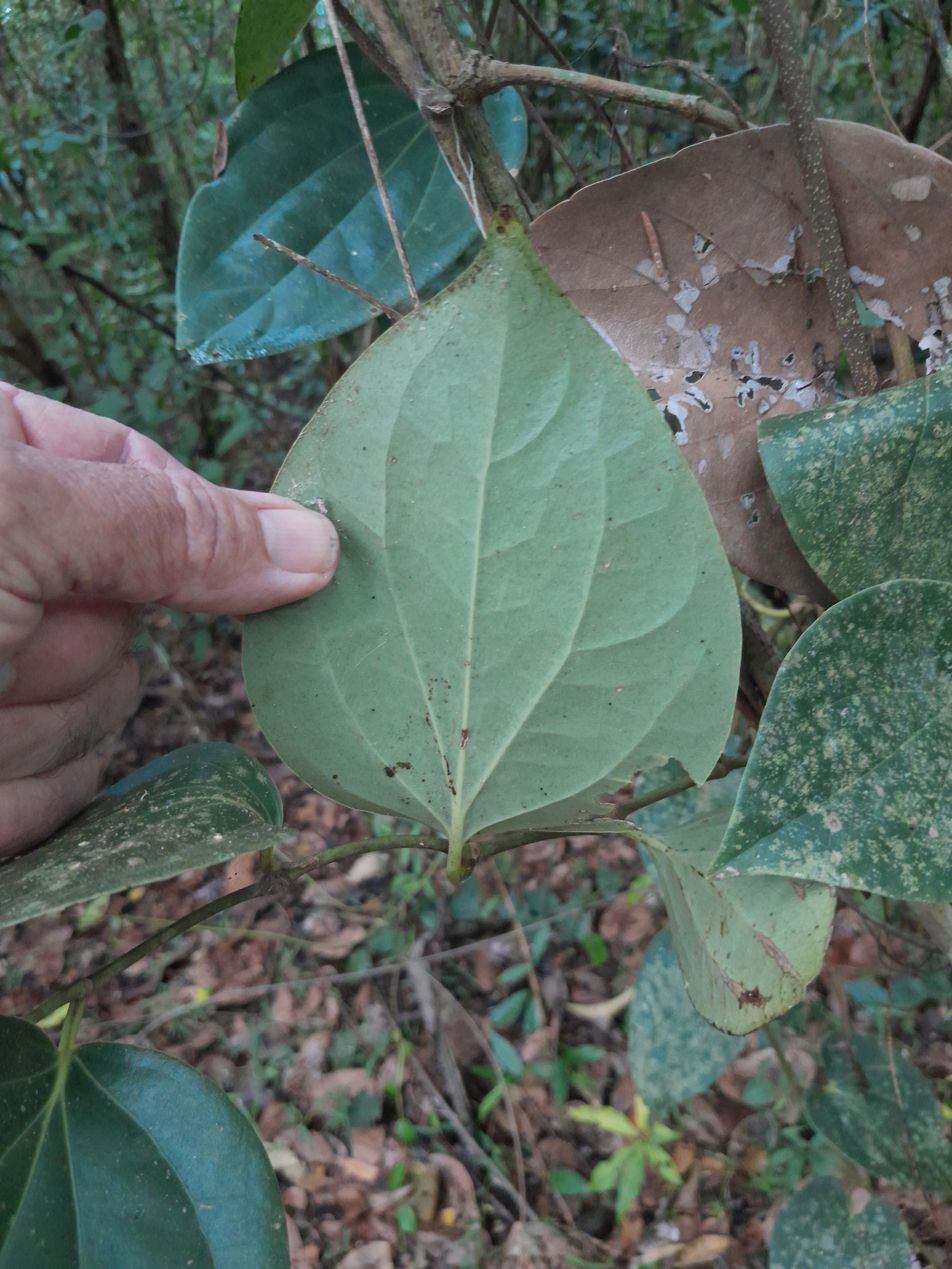

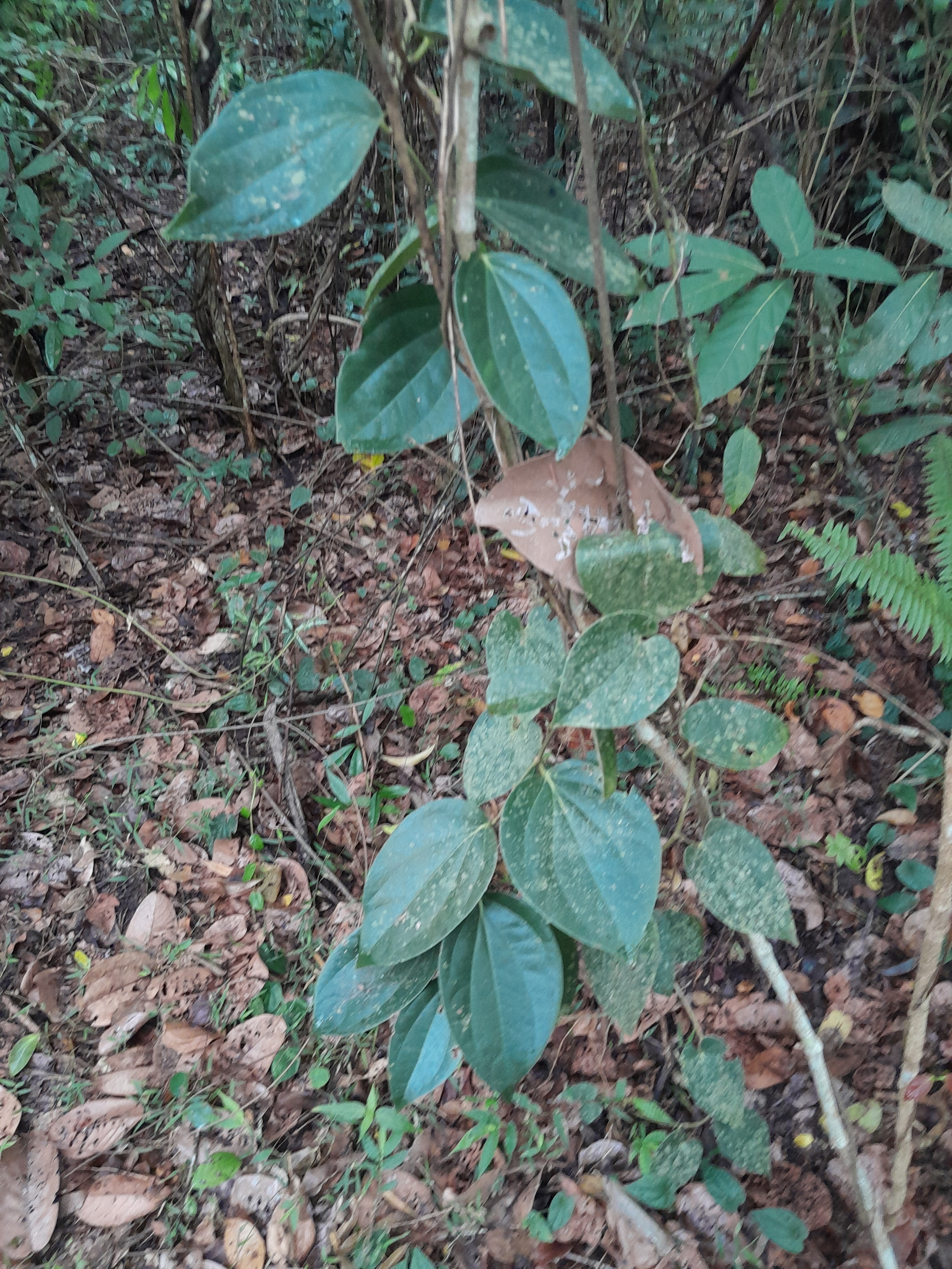
