= Figtree, New South Wales =

Figtree
- Suburb
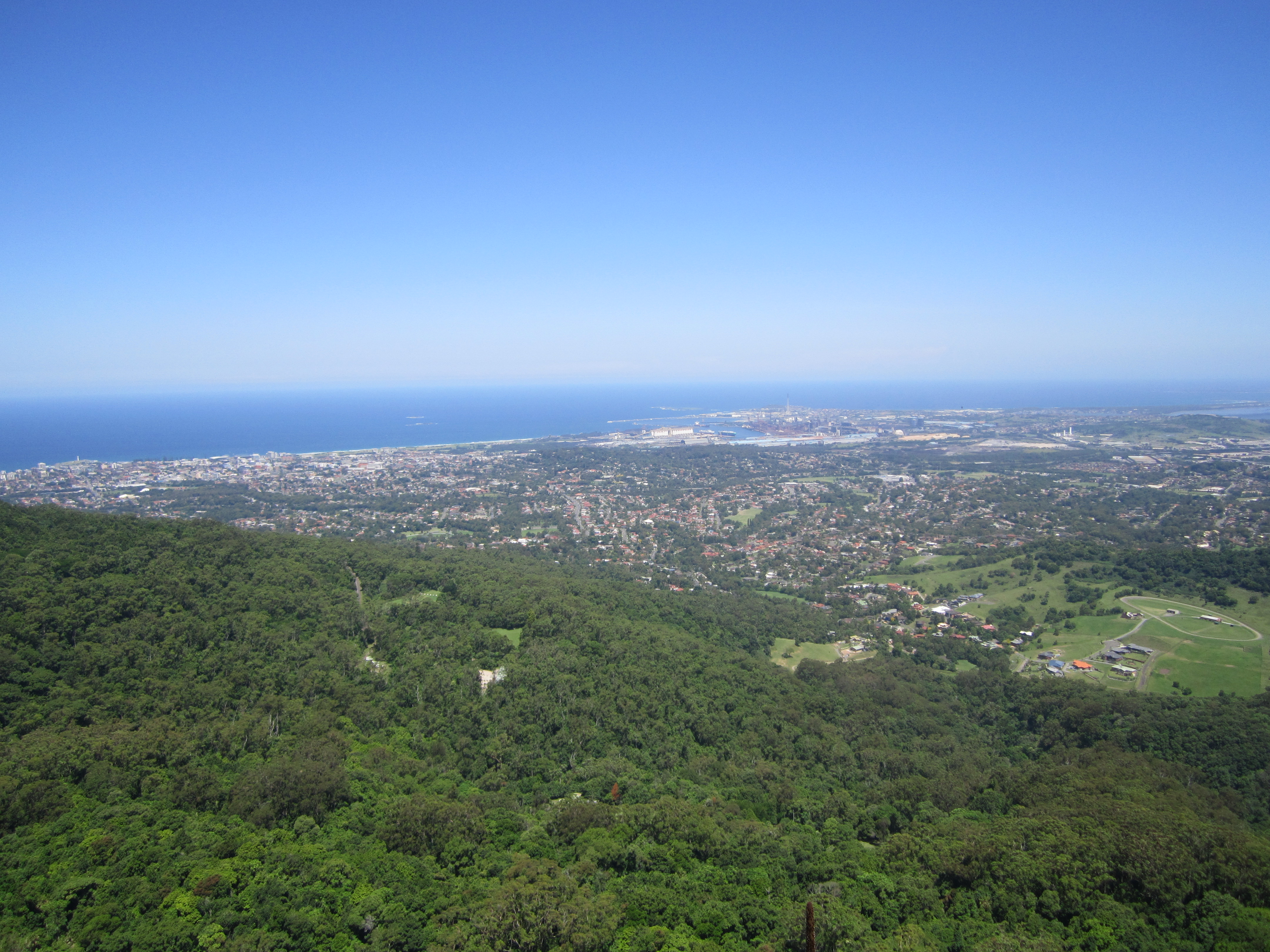

- Coordinates: 34°26′S 150°51′E
- Country: Australia
- State: New South Wales
- City: Wollongong
- LGA: City of Wollongong
- Location: 85 km (53 mi) from Sydney; 4 km (2.5 mi) from Wollongong

Government
  - State electorates: Keira; Wollongong
  - Federal division: Cunningham
- Elevation: 15 m (49 ft)

Population
  - Total: 12,335 (2021 census)
- Postcode: 2525
Suburbs around Figtree
Mount Keira		West Wollongong
Mount Kembla	Figtree	Mangerton, Mount Saint Thomas, Spring Hill
Cordeaux Heights	Unanderra

Figtree is an inner western suburb of Wollongong, New South Wales, Australia. It is south-west of West Wollongong and connected to Wollongong by the Princes Highway

There is a small commercial district near this junction and another connected area further north on the highway near the freeway entrance.

Figtree has a hotel, an oval, many specialty stores, a dog park, a private hospital and several schools.

A smaller area of residences in Figtree is Figtree Heights, a neighbourhood which is slightly raised above the general level of Figtree. To the suburb's south between Figtree and Unanderra is Cobbler's Hill, where houses have been built on its side.

== History ==
The suburb is named after a giant fig tree that once stood on the eastern side of the highway at the junction with O'Brien's Road, a mountain pass used in early days of settlement built by subscription in 1821 before completion by convict labour of Mount Keira road. In 1861, Figtree Bridge was built by Moore and Vaughan.

In 1867, Figtree Inn was built, a small weatherboard building built at the site of the turnoff to O'Brien's Road, later its name changed to Figtree Hotel, and it still stands. In the 1880s, farming was the main industry in the area. In 1888 the Figtree Sunday School began in a cottage.

On 25 November 1903, Figtree park was opened by senator Hugh Vaughan-Floyd, 12 years before his death in World War I. The public school opened in 1956, followed by Figtree High School in 1969, Figtree Heights Public School in 1972 and Nareena Hills Public School in the foothills of Mount Nebo in 1977.

On 15 October 1979, the Illawarra Private Hospital was opened.

The famous figtree was cut down in 1996 and only a small portion of its trunk is left. In 1998 Fig Tree Park was renovated with an aboriginal mosaic as a result of a community project. The name has been changed to Moreton Bay Figtree Park. During the 1998 Wollongong floods, Figtree was one of the worst suburbs hit, with floodwaters going through the Westfield shopping centre and residents being rescued by the State Emergency Service from Figtree Caravan Park.

Figtree is also known for its large successful soccer club Figtree Junior Soccer Club. They also have a stadium which Collegians Rugby League use for their games.

== Figtree Grove ==
At the junction of the highway and The Avenue is Figtree Grove, a two-storey indoor shopping centre with a Woolworths, Coles and Kmart. The shopping centre was opened in 1965. The second story is used by a couple of businesses and a second storey to its carpark facilities. Adjacent to the centre is a park which contains sports facilities, a baby health centre and a small sculpture garden.

On 23 September 1965, Westfield Figtree was opened by Westfield Corporation. It was expanded in 1974, and further expansions were completed in 2009, with another 15 specialty stores being added. Coles, Kmart and Woolworths are anchor tenants. In August 2015, it was sold by the Scentre Group to Blackstone and renamed Figtree Grove. In December 2018 it was sold to Paragon REIT (85%) and Moelis Australia (15%).

== Population ==
According to the 2021 census of Population, there were 12,335 people in Figtree.

- Aboriginal and Torres Strait Islander people made up 2.1% of the population.
- 76.0% of people were born in Australia. The most common countries of birth were England 3.3%, The former Yugoslav Republic of Macedonia 1.7%, China 1.6%, India 1.3% and Italy 1.1%.
- 77.5% of people only spoke English at home. Other languages spoken at home included Macedonian 2.7%, Mandarin 2.3%, Italian 1.6%, Arabic 1.5% and Greek 1.4%.
- The most common responses for religion were No Religion 34.1%, Catholic 22.2%, Anglican 13.9% and Eastern Orthodox 7.2%.

== Notable people ==
- Abigail Paduch, judoka
