= Knights Hill (New South Wales) =

Australian hill

Highest point
- Elevation: 778 m (2,552 ft)
- Coordinates: 34°37′S 150°42′E

Knights Hill is a 778-metre (2,552 ft) hill at 34°37′S 150°42′E in New South Wales.

The telecom. towers located near the summit transmit digital TV and FM radio for the Illawarra, South Coast and Southern Highlands. Other communications facilities include an amateur radio repeater.
