= Scarborough railway station, New South Wales =

Railway station in New South Wales, Australia

Scarborough
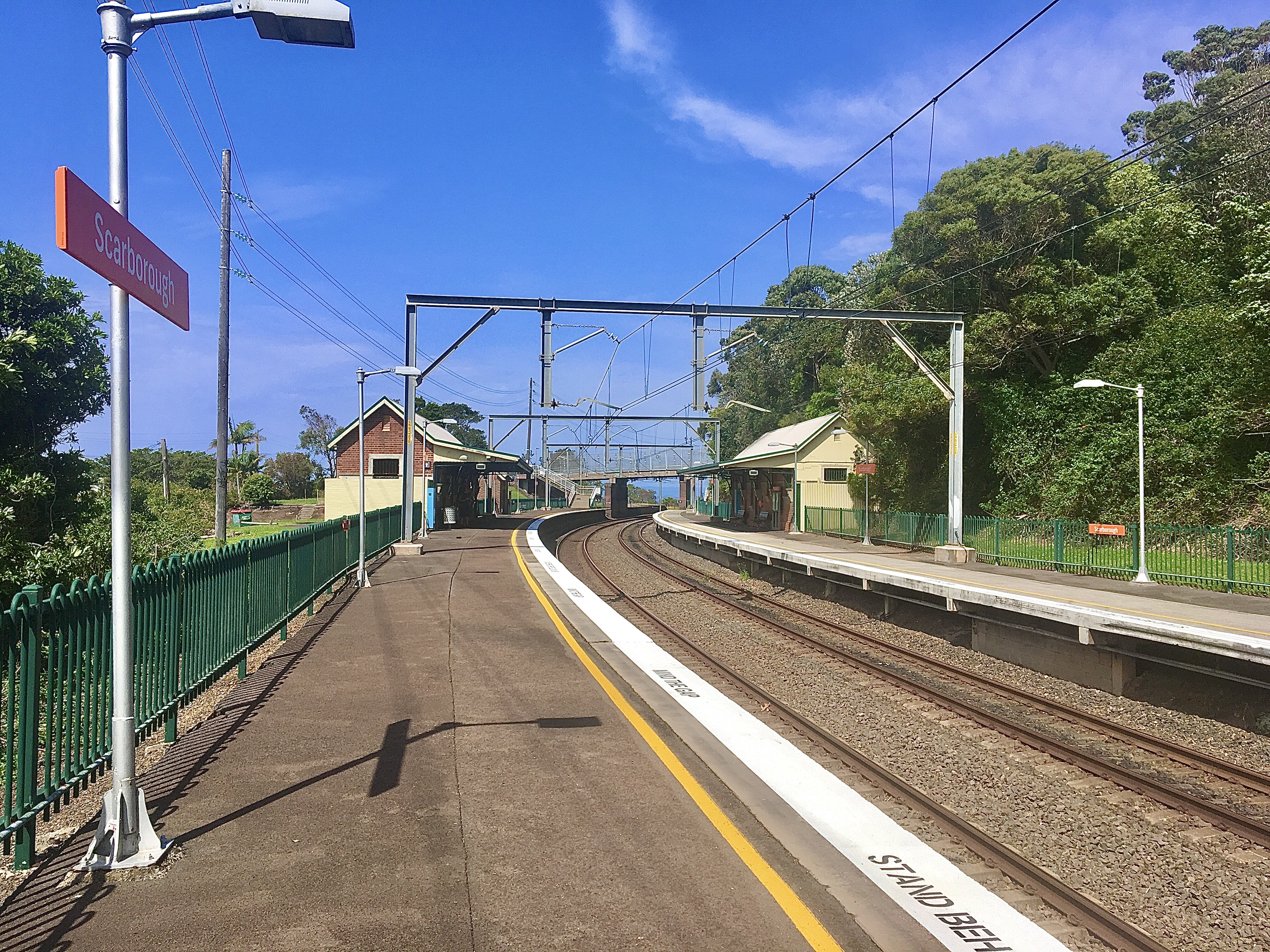
- Southbound view from Platform 1, October 2019

General information
- Location: Lawrence Hargrave Drive, Scarborough; Australia
- Coordinates: 34°15′54″S 150°57′57″E
- Elevation: 89 metres (292 ft)
- Owner: Transport Asset Manager of New South Wales
- Operator: Sydney Trains
- Line: South Coast
- Distance: 62.53 kilometres (38.85 mi) from Central
- Platforms: 2 side
- Tracks: 2

Construction
- Structure type: Ground

Other information
- Station code: SCB
- Website: Transport for NSW

History
- Opened: 21 June 1887
- Rebuilt: 21 January 1916
- Former names: Clifton (1887–1888, 1915–1916); South Clifton (1888–1903)

Passengers
- 2023: 11,760 (year); 32 (daily) (Sydney Trains, NSW TrainLink)

Services
Preceding station	Intercity Trains	Following station
Wombarra towards Kiama or Port Kembla	South Coast Line	Coalcliff towards Central or Bondi Junction
Former services
Preceding station	Former services	Following station
Austinmer towards Bomaderry	South Coast Line (1887–1888)	Terminus
Austinmer towards Bomaderry	South Coast Line (1888–1902)	Clifton towards Sydney
Coledale towards Bomaderry	South Coast Line (1902–1915)	Clifton towards Sydney
Location

Scarborough railway station is a heritage-listed railway station on the South Coast railway line in New South Wales, Australia. It serves the seaside village of Scarborough. It was added to the New South Wales State Heritage Register on 2 April 1999.

== History ==
Scarborough was originally known as South Clifton. A hotel named the Scarborough Hotel opened in the area in 1887. Scarborough may be named after the seaside resort in Yorkshire, England; or after one of the convict transport vessels in the First Fleet. The name Scarborough means "Fort on the Rock". The first subdivision of the area took place c. 1886–1887 and was advertised as "1st subdivision Town of Clifton, on Illawarra Line, 36 miles from Sydney". By the early 20th century, the Scarborough area, like Austinmer and Thirroul, had developed a reputation as a tourist resort.

The railway station first opened on 21 June 1887 as Clifton, on a site south of the present station. When the station originally opened in 1887 it was the northern terminus on the isolated part of the Illawarra line which at that time extended to Wollongong. With the renaming of North Clifton station to Clifton on 3 October 1888, the first Clifton station was renamed South Clifton. On 1 October 1903, South Clifton was renamed Scarborough. The duplication of the railway line resulted in the original station being resited, with the new station site opening on 15 August 1915. The northbound Clifton station was closed at this time, and Scarborough was once again renamed Clifton. However the next year, the station's name was reverted back to Scarborough, on 21 January 1916. The original 1887 timber platform building at Scarborough was relocated to Thirroul in 1915.

The platform buildings constructed at Scarborough in 1915 were standard brick station buildings which form a matching pair opposite each other and on the "Down" platform there is a detached brick Out-of-room from the same date.

The site originally had an overhead booking office and a signal box which have since been removed. The brick walled remains of an old carriage dock and a brick 1915 freight bank and remains of brick steps were noted on site previously but no longer appear to be extant. A yard formerly existed south of the station for the South Clifton Colliery.

== Platforms and services ==
Scarborough has two side platforms and is serviced by Sydney Trains South Coast line services travelling between Waterfall and Port Kembla. Some peak hour and late night services operate to Sydney Central, Bondi Junction and Kiama.

Platform	Line	Stopping pattern	Notes
1	SCO	services to Waterfall peak hour, late night & weekend services to Sydney Central & Bondi Junction	
2	SCO	services to Thirroul & Port Kembla peak hour, late night & weekend services to Kiama	

== Description ==
The station complex consists of type 11-design station buildings on Platform 1 and 2 and an out of room on Platform 2, all dating from 1915, as well as modern pedestrian stairs on Platform 2.

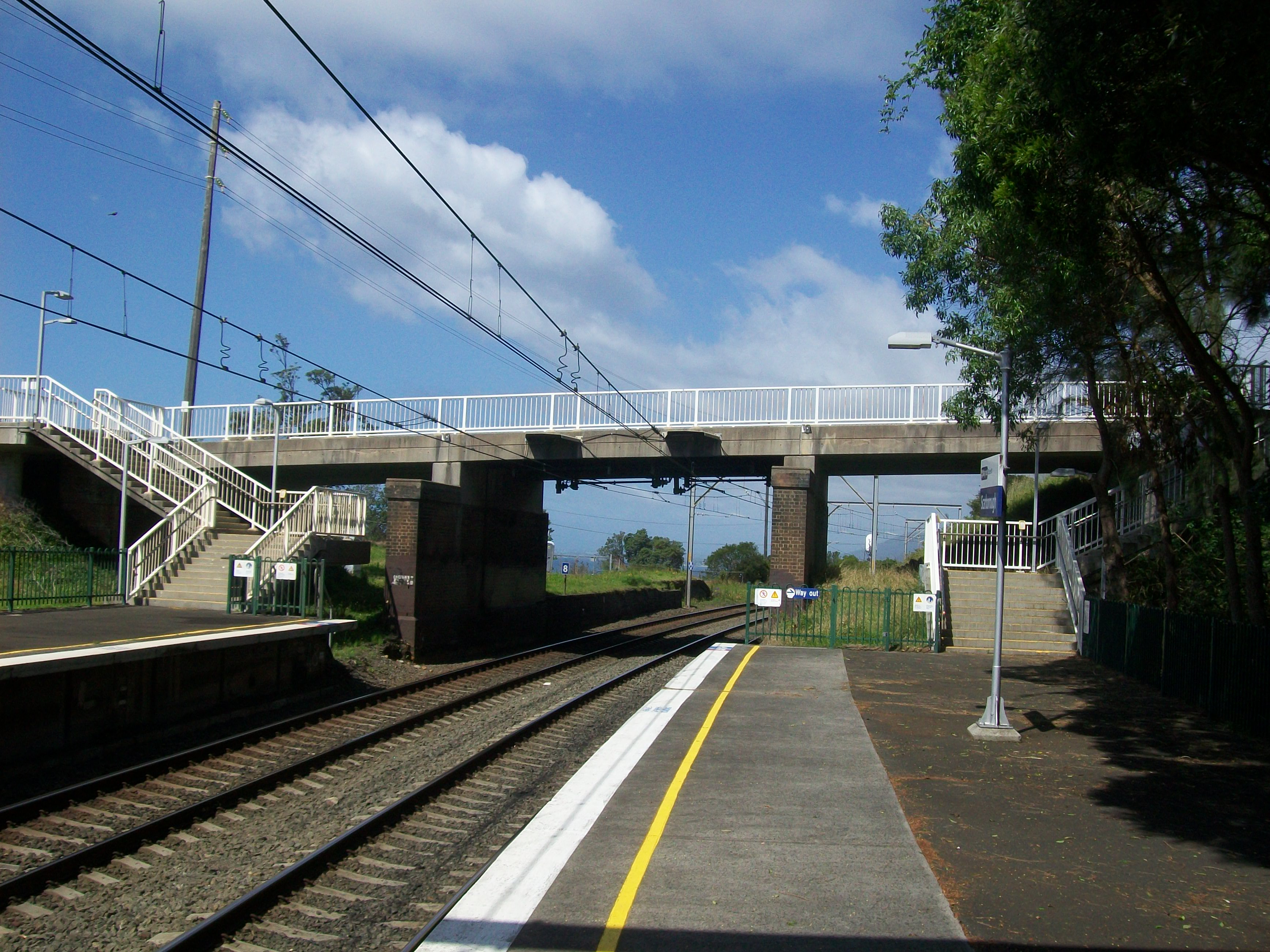
Overbridge

Scarborough Railway Station has two perimeter platforms, with Platform 1 on the west, Platform 2 on the east. The perimeters of the station are defined with dark green powder coated aluminium fencing. Platform 2 is accessed either via a driveway off First Street (A street which is not named on many popular mapping programs), or adjacent modern stairs, to the northeast of the First Street overbridge. The west platform is accessed via Railway Avenue to the west or by crossing the First Street overbridge. North of Scarborough the double line becomes single to pass through Coalcliff Tunnel.

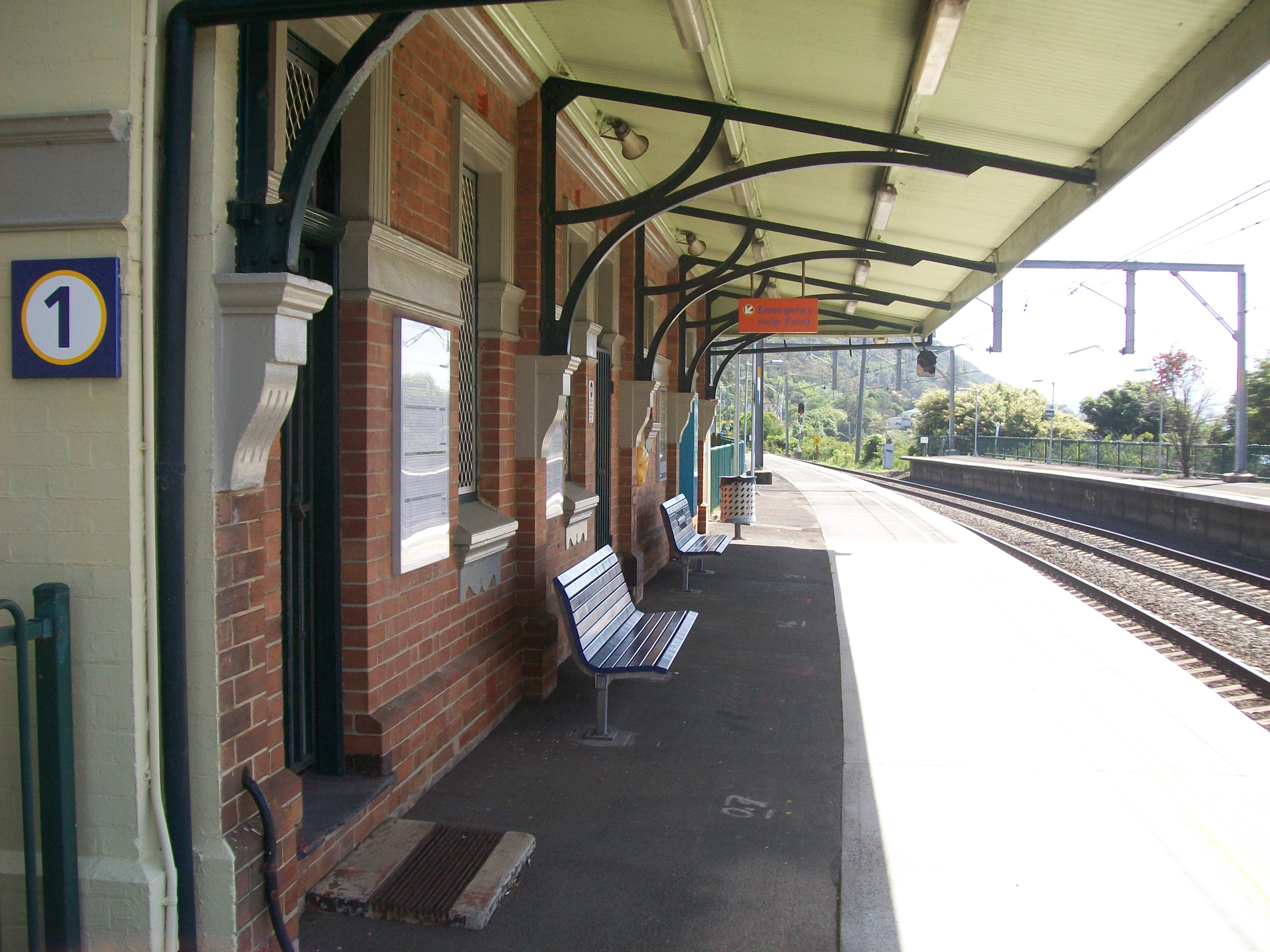
Platform 1

Platform 1 Building (1915)

The Platform 1 (west) building is a gabled face brick building with an awning on the east (Platform) side, corrugated steel roofing and a skillion corrugated steel roof to platform awning. The building has no chimneys. Gable ends feature rectangular timber louvred vents. Walls feature sandstone reveals and sills to windows and sandstone door reveals, and a sandstone corbel at door header height. There is a corrugated steel screen added to the north end of the building. The building features timber framed double hung windows with 9-paned top sashes with coloured glass panes to most. The awning is cantilevered on steel brackets mounted on decorative sandstone brackets. Doors are timber flush with 6-paned fanlights with coloured glass panes.

Reportedly the interior contains a Station Master's office, waiting room and men's toilet.

Platform 2 Building (1915)

The (east) Platform 2 building is a gabled brick building with a cantilevered platform awning, gabled corrugated steel roofing, skillion corrugated steel awning roof, and a corrugated steel screen added to north end. There are no chimneys to the roof. The walls are painted to south and east elevations, with original face brick to west (platform) and north elevations. The walls feature sandstone reveals and sills to windows and sandstone door reveals, and a sandstone corbel at door header height. The building features timber framed double hung windows, with 9-paned top sashes with coloured glass panes to most. The awning is cantilevered on steel brackets mounted on decorative sandstone wall brackets. Doors are modern timber flush doors with original 6-paned fanlights with coloured glass panes. The building has timber exposed rafter ends. There are no vents to gable ends.

Reportedly the interior contains a Station Master's office, waiting room and men's toilet.

Out of Room (1915)

Located at the southern end of Platform 2, this is a small square face brick building with a gabled corrugated steel roof, and a single door facing the platform, with a sandstone reveal around the fanlight. The fanlight is covered over. The roof ridge is parallel with the long axis of the platform.

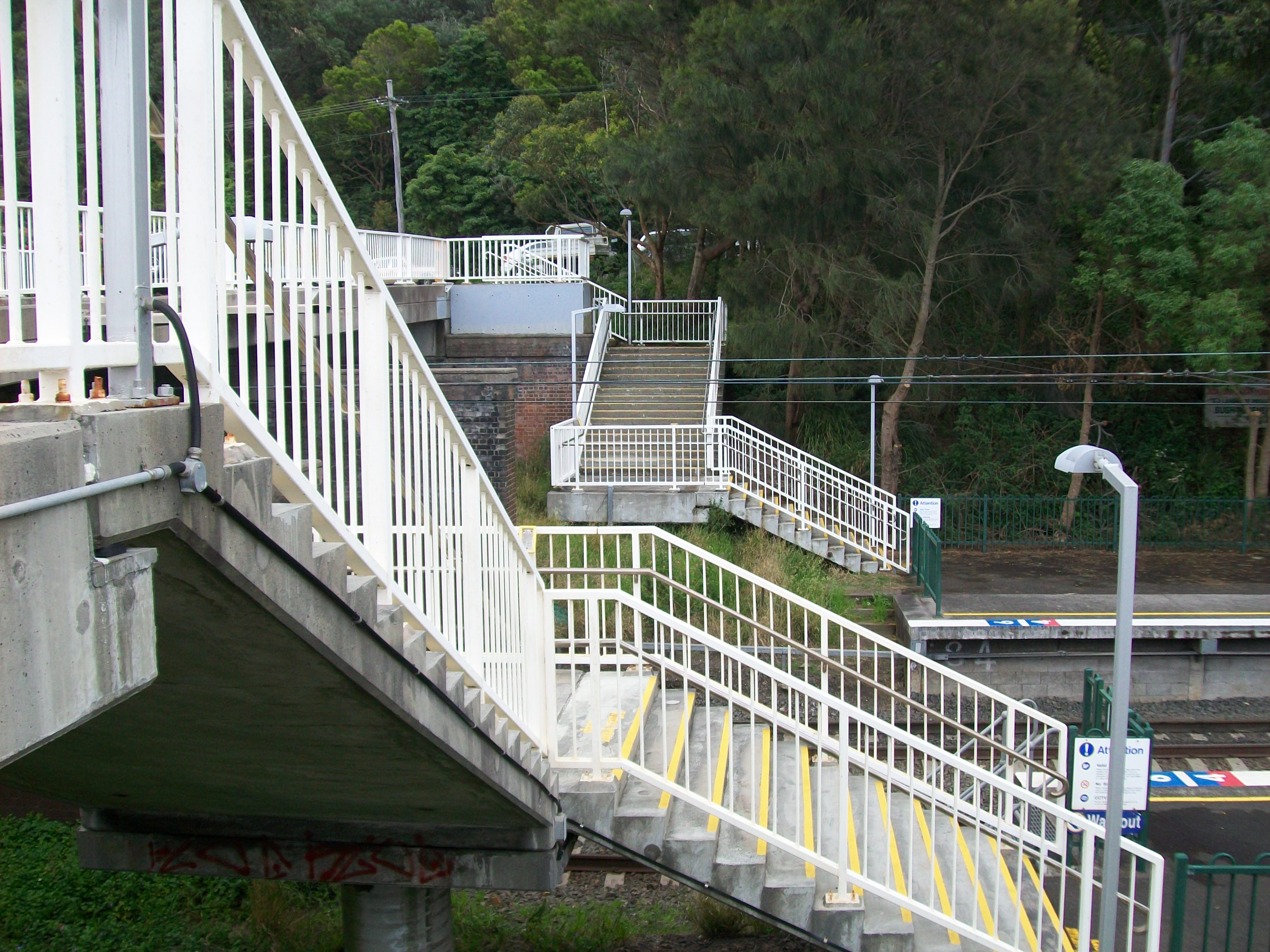
Pedestrian stairs

Pedestrian Stairs (modern)

A set of modern concrete stairs accessing the south end of Platform 2 from the First Street overbridge.

Platforms (1915)

Two perimeter platforms with modern concrete platform edges (platforms extended out).

Landscape/Natural Features

Scarborough Railway Station is located in a bushland setting with views of the Illawarra escarpment to the west.

Station Master's Residence

Adjacent to the heritage-listed complex is the former Station Master's residence. The building is of low integrity having been highly altered and there are many better examples of this type of building along the Illawarra line.

Condition

The Platform 1 Building was reported to be in moderate condition as at 8 May 2013, due to some cracking evident to the northern end of the building, while the Platform 2 Building was assessed as in good and the Out of Room very good condition.

The platform buildings and out-of-room are intact externally. The platforms have been widened.

Usability

Services departing from Scarborough station are typically not available on most weekends due to trackwork. The reason for the near constant trackwork each weekend is unknown.

=== Modifications and dates ===
- 1915: Line duplicated
- 1986: Line electrified

== Heritage listing ==
Scarborough Railway Station – including its platforms, platform buildings and out-of-room – is of historical significance for its role as a transport hub for the village of Scarborough since 1915, and its historical links to the earlier station locations. Scarborough Railway Station is also of historical significance for its association with the development of Scarborough as a tourist resort since the early 20th century. Scarborough Railway Station is of aesthetic significance as an intact group of railway structures dating from the 1915 duplication of the Illawarra line, which are good representative standard platform buildings of this period.

Scarborough railway station was listed on the New South Wales State Heritage Register on 2 April 1999 having satisfied the following criteria.

The place is important in demonstrating the course, or pattern, of cultural or natural history in New South Wales.

Scarborough Railway Station, relocated in 1915 to its current location, is of historical significance for its role as a transport hub and its association with the development of the village of Scarborough as a tourist resort, as well as demonstrating the duplication of the Illawarra line in 1915.

The place is important in demonstrating aesthetic characteristics and/or a high degree of creative or technical achievement in New South Wales.

Scarborough Railway Station is of major significance as an intact group of railway structures dating from the 1915 duplication of the Illawarra line, which are representative standard platform buildings of this period.

The place has a strong or special association with a particular community or cultural group in New South Wales for social, cultural or spiritual reasons.

The place has the potential to contribute to the local community's sense of place, and can provide a connection to the local community's past.

The place is important in demonstrating the principal characteristics of a class of cultural or natural places/environments in New South Wales.

The 1915 platform buildings and out-of-room at Scarborough Railway Station are good representative examples of railway station buildings of this period, built to standard designs. Scarborough Railway Station is a fine representative railway station with early standard brick island platform buildings. There are 12 stations on the Illawarra line with examples of this type of platform building (other examples at Banksia, Bulli, Carlton, Coledale, Erskineville, Helensburgh, Kiama, Mortdale, Rockdale, Sydenham and Wollongong). The platform building at Scarborough is virtually identical to the platform building at Helensburgh, though the building at Helensburgh is unique in being curved.
