= List of towns in Australia =

This is a list of towns in Australia by state.

== Australian Capital Territory ==
- Hall
- Canberra
- Tharwa

== New South Wales ==
As of 21 February 2019 the Geographical Names Register (GNR) of NSW, which is maintained by the Geographical Names Board of New South Wales, lists 265 places that are assigned or recorded as towns in New South Wales.

- Aberdare
- Abermain
- Adaminaby
- Adelong
- Agnes Banks
- Anna Bay
- Ardlethan
- Ariah Park
- Ashford
- Austinmer
- Avoca Beach
- Ballina
- Balranald
- Bangalow
- Baradine
- Bargo
- Barham
- Barraba
- Batemans Bay
- Batlow
- Bega
- Bellbird
- Bellingen
- Berkeley Vale
- Bermagui
- Berridale
- Berrigan
- Berrima
- Berry
- Bilpin
- Binalong
- Bingara
- Binnaway
- Blackheath
- Blaxland
- Blayney
- Boggabilla
- Boggabri
- Bolwarra
- Bomaderry
- Bombala
- Bonalbo
- Bonnells Bay
- Bowenfels
- Bowraville
- Braidwood
- Branxton
- Brewarrina
- Brooklyn
- Brunswick Heads
- Bulahdelah
- Bullaburra
- Bulli
- Bundarra
- Bungendore
- Buronga
- Burradoo
- Canowindra
- Captains Flat
- Clarence Town
- Cobar
- Coledale
- Collarenebri
- Condobolin
- Coolamon
- Cooma
- Coonabarabran
- Coonamble
- Cooranbong
- Cootamundra
- Corowa
- Cowra
- Crescent Head
- Crookwell
- Cudal
- Cumnock
- Dapto
- Dareton
- Deepwater
- Delegate
- Delungra
- Deniliquin
- Denman
- Dorrigo
- Dunedoo
- Dungog
- Edgeworth
- Ellalong
- Emu Plains
- Eugowra
- Euston
- Evans Head
- Faulconbridge
- Fingal Head
- Forbes
- Forster
- Frederickton
- Galong
- Ganmain
- Gerringong
- Geurie
- Gilgandra
- Gillieston Heights
- Gladstone
- Glen Innes
- Glenbrook
- Gol Gol
- Gorokan
- Greenhill
- Greenwell Point
- Grenfell
- Greta
- Grose Vale
- Gulargambone
- Gundagai
- Gunnedah
- Gunning
- Guyra
- Harden
- Hawks Nest
- Hay
- Hazelbrook
- Heddon Greta
- Helensburgh
- Henty
- Hexham
- Hillston
- Holbrook
- Huskisson
- Inverell
- Ivanhoe
- Jennings
- Jerilderie
- Jindabyne
- Jugiong
- Junee
- Kandos
- Katoomba
- Kearsley
- Kempsey
- Kimovale
- Kinchela
- Kurrajong
- Kurri Kurri
- Kyogle
- Lake Cargelligo
- Lake Illawarra
- Lapstone
- Lawson
- Leura
- Lightning Ridge
- Macksville
- Mallanganee
- Manildra
- Manilla
- Marulan
- Mathoura
- Medlow Bath
- Mendooran
- Menindee
- Merimbula
- Millfield
- Milton
- Moama
- Molong
- Moree
- Moulamein
- Mount Riverview
- Mount Victoria
- Mudgee
- Murrumburrah
- Murwillumbah
- Muswellbrook
- Nabiac
- Nambucca Heads
- Narooma
- Narrandera
- Narromine
- Neath
- Nelson Bay
- Nimmitabel
- Noraville
- North Richmond
- Nowra
- Numbaa
- Nundle
- Nyngan
- Old Junee
- Ourimbah
- Oxley Vale
- Pallamallawa
- Pambula
- Parkes
- Paterson
- Paxton
- Peak Hill
- Picton
- Port Kembla
- Port Macquarie
- Raleigh
- Raymond Terrace
- Rylstone
- Scarborough
- Smithtown
- South Gundagai
- South West Rocks
- Springwood
- Stanwell Park
- Stuart Town
- Sussex Inlet
- Talbingo
- Tarcutta
- Taree
- Tea Gardens
- Tenterfield
- Terrigal
- The Oaks
- The Rock
- Thirlmere
- Thirroul
- Thurgoona
- Tingha
- Tomerong
- Tottenham
- Toukley
- Trangie
- Trundle
- Tullamore
- Tumbarumba
- Tumut
- Tuncurry
- Tuntable Creek
- Tweed Heads
- Ulladulla
- Ungarie
- Uralla
- Urana
- Uranquinty
- Urbenville
- Urunga
- Valley Heights
- Walcha
- Walgett
- Warialda
- Warrell Creek
- Warren
- Warrimoo
- Waterfall
- Wellington
- Wentworth
- Wentworth Falls
- West Wallsend
- West Wyalong
- Weston
- Wilcannia
- Wingham
- Wombarra
- Woodburn
- Woodenbong
- Woodford
- Woodstock
- Wyalong
- Wyong
- Yass
- Yeoval
- Young
- Scone

== Northern Territory ==
- Adelaide River
- Ali Curung
- Alice Springs
- Alpurrurulam
- Alyangula
- Amoonguna
- Angurugu
- Aputula
- Areyonga
- Atitjere
- Barrow Creek
- Barunga
- Batchelor
- Birdum
- Borroloola
- Bulman
- Daly River
- Daly Waters
- Elliott
- Fleming
- Gunbalanya
- Haasts Bluff
- Harts Range
- Hermannsburg
- Humpty Doo
- Imanpa
- Jabiru
- Kalkarindji
- Kaltukatjara
- Katherine
- Kintore
- Kulgera
- Lajamanu
- Larrimah
- Maningrida
- Mataranka
- Milikapiti
- Minjilang
- Mutitjulu
- Newcastle Waters
- Nganmarriyanga
- Ngukurr
- Nhulunbuy
- Numbulwar
- Nyirripi
- Maningrida
- Papunya
- Peppimenarti
- Pine Creek
- Tennant Creek
- Ti-Tree
- Timber Creek
- Wadeye
- Warruwi
- Wurrumiyanga
- Yarralin
- Yirrkala
- Yuendumu
- Yulara

== Queensland ==
- Adavale
- Allora
- Aramac
- Atherton
- Augathella
- Ayr
- Banana
- Barcaldine
- Beaudesert
- Bedourie
- Biloela
- Birdsville
- Blackall
- Blackbutt
- Blackwater
- Bogantungan
- Boonah
- Bouldercombe
- Boulia
- Bowen
- Bray Park
- Calliope
- Cambooya
- Camooweal
- Capella
- Cardwell
- Cashmere
- Charleville
- Charters Towers
- Childers
- Chillagoe
- Chinchilla
- Clermont
- Clifton
- Cloncurry
- Coen
- Collinsville
- Cooktown
- Cooroy
- Crows Nest
- Cunnamulla
- Dysart, Queensland
- Dalby
- Dirranbandi
- Duaringa
- Eidsvold
- Emerald
- Emu Park
- Esk
- Gatton
- Gayndah
- Georgetown
- Goombungee
- Goondiwindi
- Gordonvale
- Gracemere
- Grantham
- Greenvale
- Hebel
- Herberton
- Highfields
- Hughenden
- Ingham
- Inglewood
- Injune
- Innisfail
- Isisford
- Jimboomba
- Kilcoy
- Kilkivan
- Kingaroy
- Laidley
- Longreach
- Maleny
- Mareeba
- Marlborough
- Miles
- Mitchell
- Monto
- Mount Morgan
- Mount Samson
- Moura
- Mundubbera
- Murgon
- Muttaburra
- Nambour
- Nobby
- Normanton
- Oakey
- Proserpine
- Quilpie
- Rathdowney
- Ravenswood
- Richmond
- Rolleston
- Roma
- Rosewood
- St George
- Samford
- Samsonvale
- Sapphire
- Sarina
- Springsure
- Stanthorpe
- Strathpine
- Surat
- Tambo
- Taroom
- Texas
- Tolga
- Toowoomba
- Thargomindah
- Theodore
- Tully
- Wallangarra
- Warwick
- Warner
- Weipa
- Westwood
- Windorah
- Winton
- Yeppoon
- Yungaburra

== See also ==
- List of towns and cities in Australia by year of settlement
