= Lists of cities and towns =

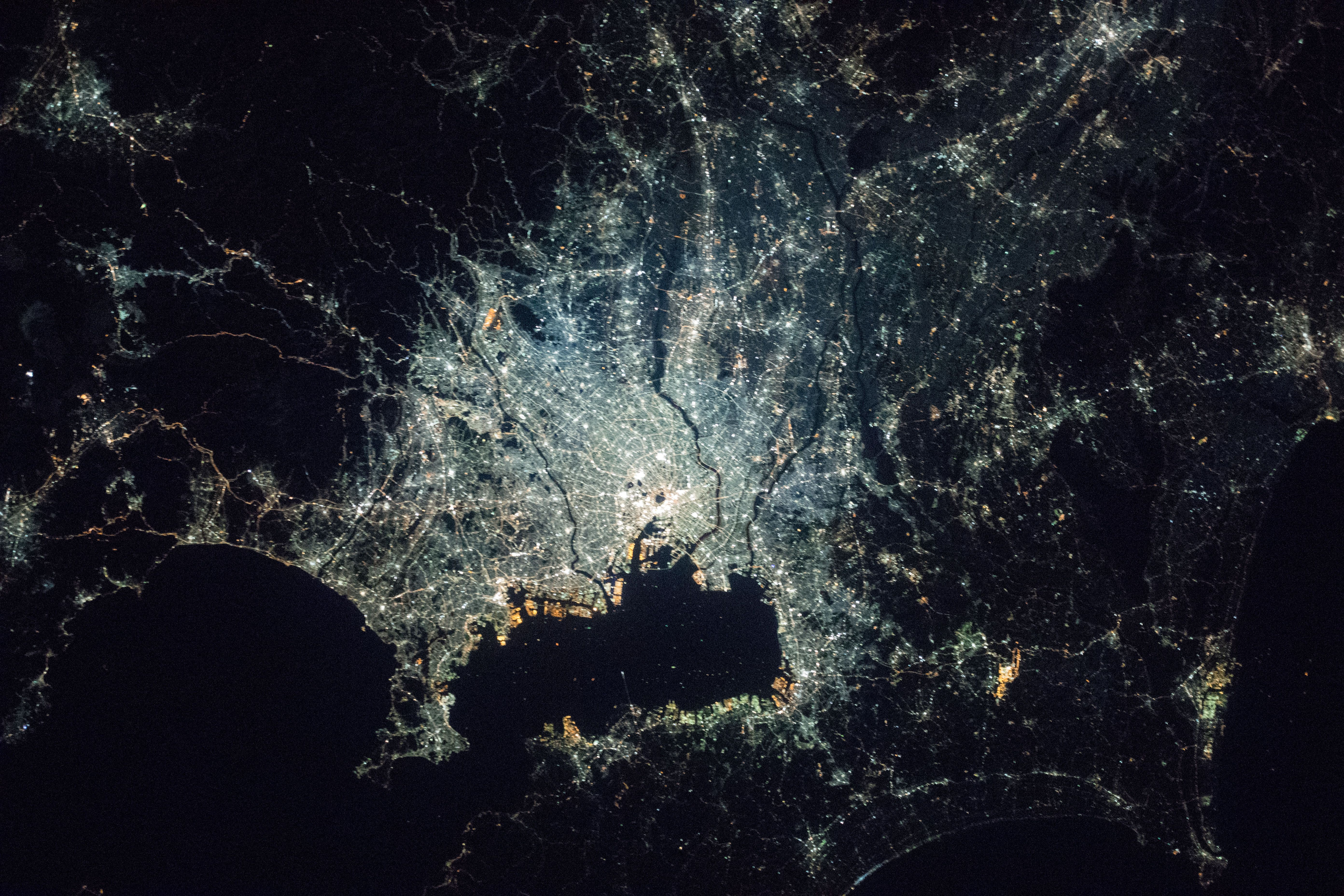
Night in the Greater Tokyo Area seen from the ISS, January 2018

Lists of cities and towns list notable cities and towns in each country, and are organized by geographic area. See Lists of cities and Lists of towns for additional lists organized in different ways, such as by size.,

== Asia ==
- List of cities in Afghanistan
- List of cities and towns in Armenia
- List of cities in Azerbaijan
- List of cities in Bahrain
- List of cities and towns in Bangladesh
- List of cities, towns and villages in Bhutan
- Municipalities of Brunei
- List of cities and towns in Cambodia
- List of cities in China
- List of villages in China
- List of cities, towns and villages in Cyprus
- List of cities and towns in Georgia (country)
- List of towns in Hong Kong
- List of villages in Hong Kong
- List of cities in India by population
- List of Indonesian cities by population
- List of cities in Iran by province
- List of cities in Iraq
- List of cities in Israel
- List of cities in Japan
- List of towns in Japan
- List of villages in Japan
- List of cities in Jordan
- List of cities in Kazakhstan
- List of cities in North Korea
- List of cities in South Korea
- List of towns in South Korea
- List of townships in South Korea
- Areas of Kuwait
- List of cities in Kyrgyzstan
- List of cities in Laos
- List of cities and towns in Lebanon
- List of towns without municipalities in Lebanon
- List of cities in Malaysia
- List of cities, towns and villages in the Maldives
- List of cities in Mongolia
- List of cities and largest towns in Myanmar
- List of cities in Nepal
- List of cities in Oman
- List of cities in Pakistan
- List of cities administered by the Palestinian Authority
- List of cities in the Philippines
- List of cities and municipalities in the Philippines
- List of cities in Qatar
- List of cities in Russia
- List of cities and towns in Saudi Arabia
- List of places in Singapore
- List of cities in Sri Lanka
- List of towns in Sri Lanka
- List of cities in Syria
- List of administrative divisions of Taiwan
- List of cities in Tajikistan
- List of towns and villages in Tajikistan
- List of municipalities in Thailand
- List of largest cities and towns in Turkey
- List of municipalities in Turkey
- List of cities in Turkmenistan
- List of cities, towns and villages in Turkmenistan
- List of cities in the United Arab Emirates
- List of cities in Uzbekistan
- List of cities in Vietnam
- List of cities in Yemen

== Europe ==
- List of cities in Albania
- List of cities and towns in Andorra
- List of cities and towns in Armenia
- List of cities and towns in Austria
- List of cities in Azerbaijan
- List of cities and largest towns in Belarus
- List of cities in Belgium
- List of cities in Bosnia and Herzegovina
- List of cities and towns in Bulgaria
- List of cities and towns in Croatia
- List of cities, towns and villages in Cyprus
- List of cities and towns in the Czech Republic
- List of cities in Denmark
- List of cities and towns in Estonia
- List of cities and towns in Finland
- List of communes in France with over 20,000 inhabitants
- List of cities and towns in Georgia (country)
- List of cities and towns in Germany
- List of cities in Greece
- List of cities and towns of Hungary
- Localities of Iceland
- List of cities in Ireland
- List of cities in Italy
- List of cities in Kazakhstan
- List of cities in Kosovo
- List of cities and towns in Latvia
- List of cities in Lithuania
- List of towns in Lithuania
- List of municipalities in Liechtenstein
- List of towns in Luxembourg
- List of cities in Malta
- List of cities and towns in Moldova
- Monaco (city-state)
- List of cities in Montenegro
- List of cities in the Netherlands
- List of cities, towns and villages in the Netherlands by province
- List of cities in North Macedonia
- List of towns and cities in Norway
- List of cities and towns in Poland
- List of cities in Portugal
- List of towns in Portugal
- List of cities and towns in Romania
- List of cities and towns in Russia
- List of municipalities of San Marino
- List of cities in Serbia
- List of cities and towns in Slovakia
- List of cities and towns in Slovenia
- List of municipalities of Spain
- List of cities in Sweden
- List of cities in Switzerland
- List of largest cities and towns in Turkey
- List of cities in Ukraine
- List of cities in the United Kingdom
- List of towns in the United Kingdom

== Africa ==
- List of cities in Algeria
- List of cities and towns in Angola
- List of cities in Chad
- List of cities in Libya
- List of populated places in Nigeria
- List of cities in Madagascar
- List of cities in Morocco
- List of cities in Somalia
- List of municipalities in South Africa
- List of cities in Tunisia

== North America ==
- List of towns in Canada
- Lists of counties in the United States
- List of cities and towns in Greenland

== South America and nearby ==
- List of cities in Argentina
- List of cities, towns and villages in Barbados
- List of cities in Brazil by population
- List of towns in Chile
- List of cities and towns in Suriname

== Australia ==
- List of towns in Australia
- List of cities and towns in South Australia
- List of towns in Western Australia

(See also List of towns and cities in Australia by year of settlement )

== Fictional ==
- List of fictional towns and villages

== See also ==
- Lists of towns
- Lists of cities
- Lists of neighborhoods by city
