= Lists of towns =

This is a list of lists of towns and villages by country:

== Africa ==
=== Equatorial Guinea ===
- List of cities in Equatorial Guinea

=== Gambia ===
- List of cities in the Gambia

=== Guinea-Bissau ===
- List of cities in Guinea-Bissau

=== Lesotho ===
- List of cities in Lesotho

=== South Africa ===
- List of towns in South Africa

=== Saint Helena, Ascension and Tristan da Cunha ===
- List of towns in Saint Helena, Ascension and Tristan da Cunha

== Asia ==
=== Bahrain ===
- List of cities in Bahrain

=== East Timor ===
- List of cities, towns and villages in East Timor

=== Hong Kong ===
- List of cities and towns in Hong Kong

=== India ===
- List of census towns in Andhra Pradesh
- List of towns in Tamil Nadu by population

=== Israel ===
- Cities in Israel

=== Saudi Arabia ===
- List of cities and towns in Saudi Arabia

=== Syria ===
- List of cities, towns and villages in Syria

== Europe ==
=== Armenia ===
- List of cities and towns in Armenia

=== Austria ===
- List of towns in Austria

=== Bulgaria ===
- List of towns in Bulgaria

=== Croatia ===
- List of cities in Croatia

=== Cyprus ===
- List of cities, towns and villages in Cyprus

=== Denmark ===
- List of towns in Denmark

=== Estonia ===
- List of cities and towns in Estonia

=== Faroe Islands ===
- List of towns in the Faroe Islands

=== Finland ===
- List of towns in Finland

=== France ===
- List of towns in France

=== Germany ===
- List of towns in Germany

=== Greece ===
- List of towns and villages in Greece

=== Hungary ===
- List of towns in Hungary

=== Iceland ===
- List of cities and towns in Iceland

=== Republic of Ireland ===
- List of towns and villages in the Republic of Ireland

=== Isle of Man ===
- List of places in the Isle of Man

=== Kosovo ===
- List of cities in Kosovo

=== Latvia ===
- List of cities and towns in Latvia

=== Luxembourg ===
- List of towns in Luxembourg

=== Malta ===
- List of towns in Malta

=== Netherlands ===
- List of towns in the Netherlands

=== North Macedonia ===
- List of cities in North Macedonia

=== Norway ===
Norway officially does not designate between towns and cities. The general Norwegian term for both is "by".

- List of cities in Norway

=== Poland ===
- List of towns in Poland

=== Portugal ===
- List of towns in Portugal

=== Romania ===
- List of towns in Romania

=== Russia ===
- List of cities and towns in Russia

=== Slovakia ===
- List of towns in Slovakia

=== Slovenia ===
- List of cities and towns in Slovenia

=== Spain ===
- List of municipalities of Spain

=== Sweden ===
- List of cities in Sweden

=== United Kingdom ===
- List of towns in the United Kingdom
- List of ONS built-up areas in England by population
- List of towns and villages in Northern Ireland

== North America ==
=== Canada ===
- List of towns in Canada

=== Dominica ===
- List of towns and villages in Dominica

=== United States ===
- List of towns in the United States

== South America ==
=== Argentina ===
- List of cities in Argentina

=== Chile ===
- List of towns in Chile

=== Uruguay ===
- List of cities in Uruguay

== Oceania ==
=== Australia ===
- List of towns in Australia

=== New Zealand ===
- List of towns in New Zealand

=== Papua New Guinea ===
- List of towns in Papua New Guinea

== Other lists ==
- List of towns and villages in New France
- List of towns in Tibet by elevation
- List of towns in Zacatecas
- List of railway towns
- List of summer colonies

== See also ==
- Lists of cities and towns
- Lists of cities
- List of towns of the world
