= Frenchy (comedian) =

Australian comedian and YouTuber

- Born: April 27, 1987 (age 39)
- Other name: Ben French
- Occupation: Comedian

YouTube information
- Channels: Frenchy SungaAttack; FrenchySecond
- Years active: 2012–present
- Genre: Comedy
- Subscribers: 785 thousand (Frenchy SungaAttack); 12.7 thousand (FrenchySecond)
- Views: 156 million (Frenchy SungaAttack); 368 thousand (FrenchySecond)
- Last updated: 8 May 2022

Benjamin French (born 27 April 1987), known professionally as Frenchy (or by his YouTube channel name Frenchy SungaAttack), is an Australian comedian and YouTuber. His YouTube channel has more than 700 thousand subscribers.

== Early life ==
Frenchy describes himself as being from the "ghettos of Wollongong", referring to Austinmer, a Wollongong suburb.

Frenchy describes his parents as "polite and good Christian people; they don’t really swear or drink and they’re not really too fond of my style of comedy", also adding: "My parents cannot sit through my videos … They’re just happy I’m not teaching any more."

== Career ==
Frenchy initially began his career as a substitute teacher before becoming a comedian. French taught at Keira, Warilla, Corrimal, Bulli, Smith's Hill and Woonona high schools; however, his video content eventually led to the end of his career by the Board of Studies. According to Frenchy, he filmed videos in the school with his students (per permission forms) and with the principal's permission; however, as a result of a couple students forging the forms, their parents complained to the principal leading to the conclusion of his teaching career.

ABC and Illawarra Mercury describe Frenchy's humour to be blue collar, drawing on "past relationships, Tinder encounters, bloke culture and time spent in nightclubs and schools". In his videos, which are mainly short skits, Frenchy includes characters such as his close friends and girlfriend.

== Controversy ==
Following Frenchy publishing a satirical video mocking his hometown Wollongong, he was accused of "trying to make a quick buck" and putting the "region’s tourism industry at risk."
