= Wombarra railway station =

Railway station in New South Wales, Australia

Wombarra
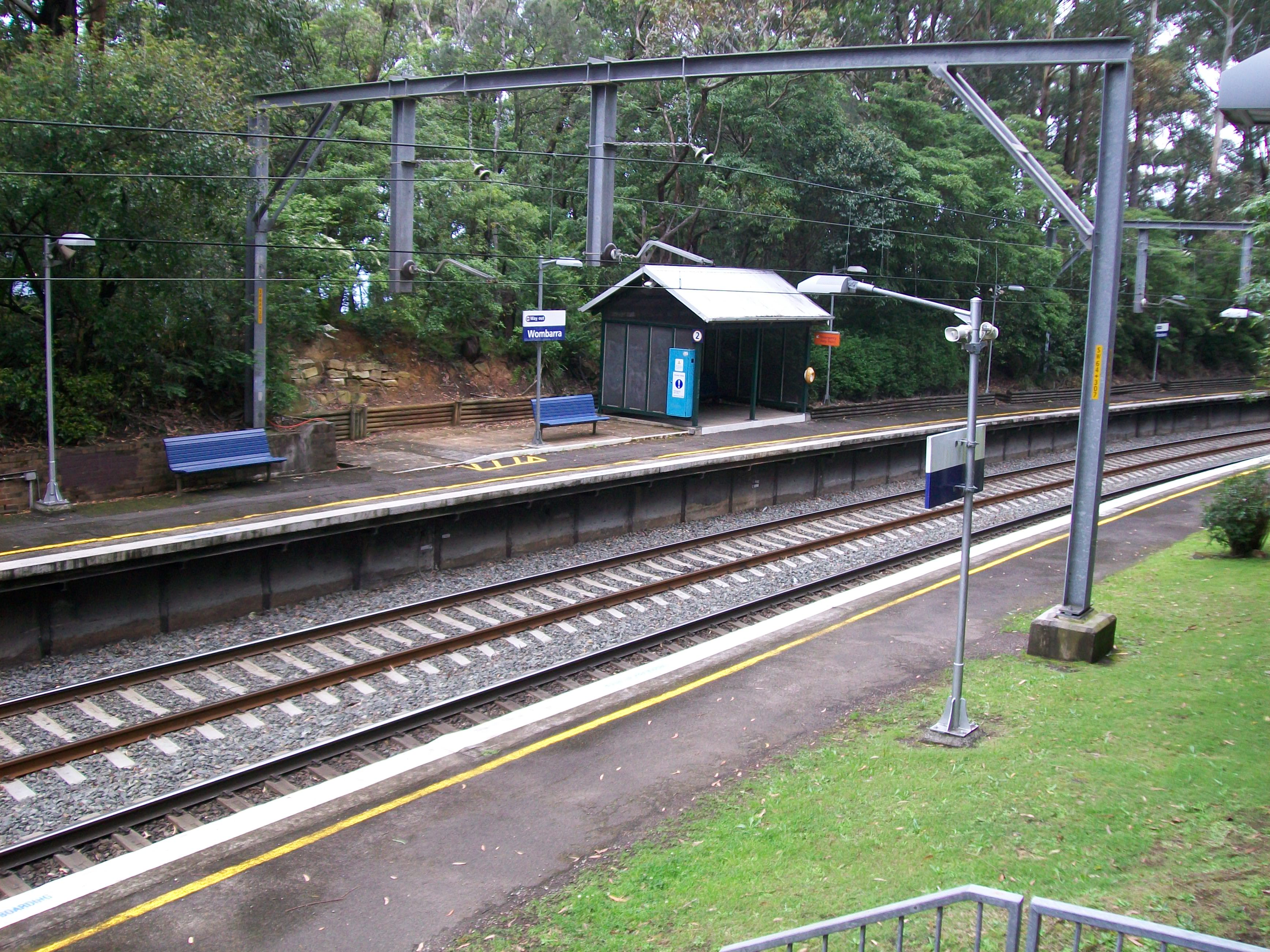
- Southbound view from Platform 2, October 2011

General information
- Location: Morrison Avenue, Wombarra; Australia
- Coordinates: 34°16′32″S 150°57′12″E
- Elevation: 65 metres (213 ft)
- Owner: Transport Asset Manager of New South Wales
- Operator: Sydney Trains
- Line: South Coast
- Distance: 64.36 kilometres (39.99 mi) from Central
- Platforms: 2 side
- Tracks: 2

Construction
- Structure type: Ground

Other information
- Station code: WMJ
- Website: Transport for NSW

History
- Opened: 12 February 1917
- Former names: Brown's Ridge

Passengers
- 2023: 18,030 (year); 49 (daily) (Sydney Trains, NSW TrainLink)

Services
Preceding station	Intercity Trains	Following station
Coledale towards Kiama or Port Kembla	South Coast Line	Scarborough towards Central or Bondi Junction
Location

Wombarra railway station is located on the South Coast railway line in New South Wales, Australia. It serves the village of Wombarra opening for first miner passengers on the down line on 7 December 1916 named as Wombarra (Illawarra Mercury 15 December 1916).

== Platforms and services ==
Wombarra has two side platforms and is serviced by Sydney Trains South Coast line services travelling between Waterfall and Port Kembla. Some peak hour and late night services operate to Sydney Central, Bondi Junction and Kiama.

Platform	Line	Stopping pattern	Notes
1	SCO	services to Waterfall peak hour, late night & weekend services to Sydney Central & Bondi Junction	
2	SCO	services to Thirroul & Port Kembla peak hour, late night & weekend services to Kiama	
