= Austinmer =

- Suburb
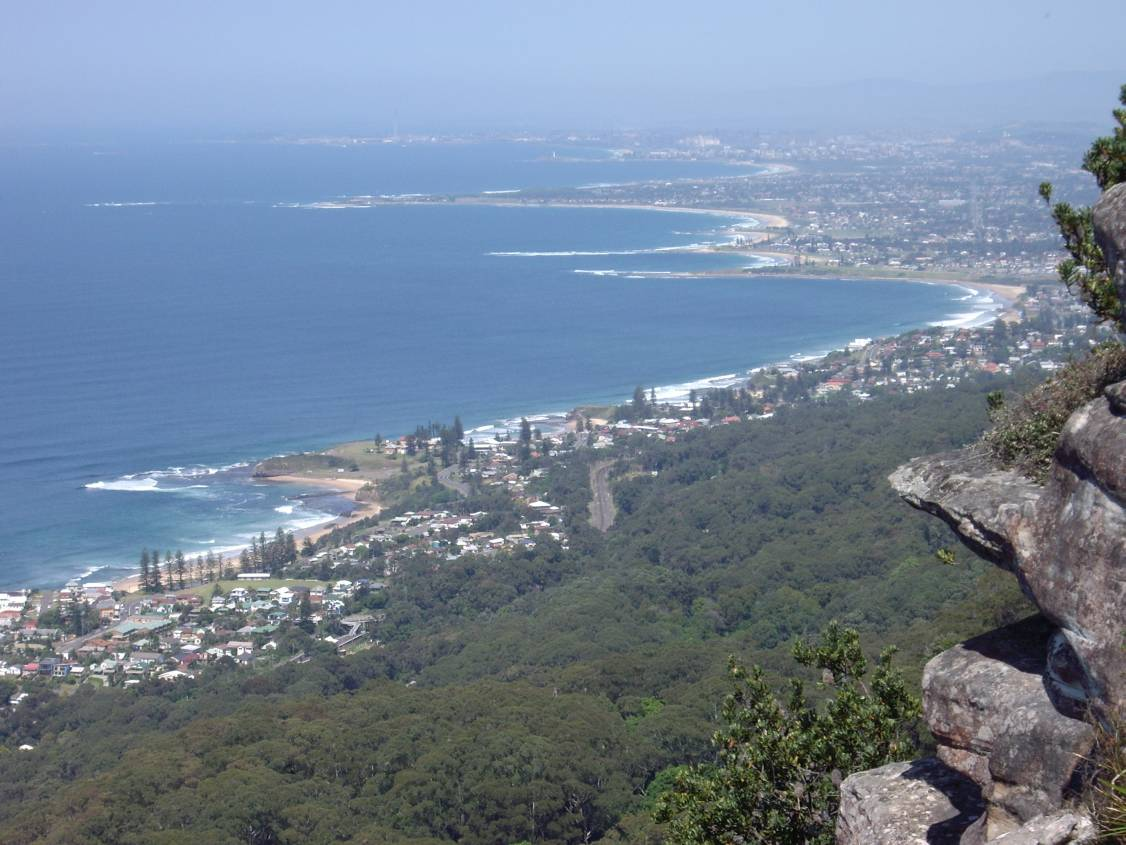
- Lookout from the Illawarra escarpment above Wombarra over the northern Illawarra plain viewing Austinmer in the foreground, Thirroul, Bulli, Wollongong up to Port Kembla in the far distance.

- Coordinates: 34.306311°S 150.93451°E
- Country: Australia
- State: New South Wales
- City: Wollongong
- LGA: City of Wollongong
- Location: 71 km (44 mi) S of Sydney; 15 km (9.3 mi) N of Wollongong

Government
  - State electorate: Heathcote
  - Federal division: Cunningham
- Elevation: 27 m (89 ft)

Population
  - Total: 2,725 (2021 census)
- Postcode: 2515
Suburbs around Austinmer
Coledale
Austinmer
Thirroul

Austinmer (/ɔːstənmər/) is a northern village of Wollongong on the south coast of New South Wales, Australia. It sits in the northern Illawarra region, south of Stanwell Park and immediately north of Thirroul.

The town's main beach is Austinmer Beach, a patrolled surf beach and a popular tourist beach. A second smaller and unpatrolled beach lies directly to the north of Austinmer beach. It is called Little Austinmer Beach, known locally as 'dog beach', as it is a popular off-leash zone for dog walking.

The main road through the town is Lawrence Hargrave Drive, which connects with the Princes Highway at Bulli Pass. Moore Street connects Austinmer railway station to Lawrence Hargrave Drive, and, along with a short stretch along Lawrence Hargrave Drive, constitutes Austinmer's commercial presence, as well as a police station, school, churches, and veterinary clinic.

The Headland Hotel to the north of Austinmer Beach was featured in the 2005 to 2006 television series headLand.

It is served by Austinmer railway station on the South Coast railway line which runs electric double deck train services to Sydney and Wollongong.

== History ==
By the 1860s, the area was simply called "North Bulli". The name was later changed to Austinmere (later dropping the final "e" and pronounced "mer", the French word for "sea"; Austin (the original mine owner/manager) by the sea) with the opening of the North Illawarra Coal Company's mine around 1887. Some have suggested that the area was originally called Sidmouth, named after the Devonshire birthplace of Robert Marsh Westmacott who owned land that now includes Austinmer. It turns out that a future owner, one Biddulph Henning, named it Sidmouth after where he had been staying in 1891 just prior to his return to Australia and subsequent purchasing of the land in Austinmer. As the historian Joseph Davis explained, the name "Sidmouth" is unrecorded prior to Henning's purchase of the property.

Austinmer was the site of the Hicks Point coal jetty from 1886 to 1915, when it was destroyed by fire. Iron dowel pins that secured the timber uprights of the wharf to the bedrock and an iron mooring ring set into in the rock are all that remain of it today.

== Demographics ==
In the 2021 Census, there were 2,725 people in Austinmer, 81.2% of whom were born in Australia. The next most common country of birth was England at 5.8%. 93.7% of people only spoke English at home. The most common responses for religion were No Religion 53.2%, Catholic 18.6% and Anglican 13.2%.

== Glastonbury Gardens ==
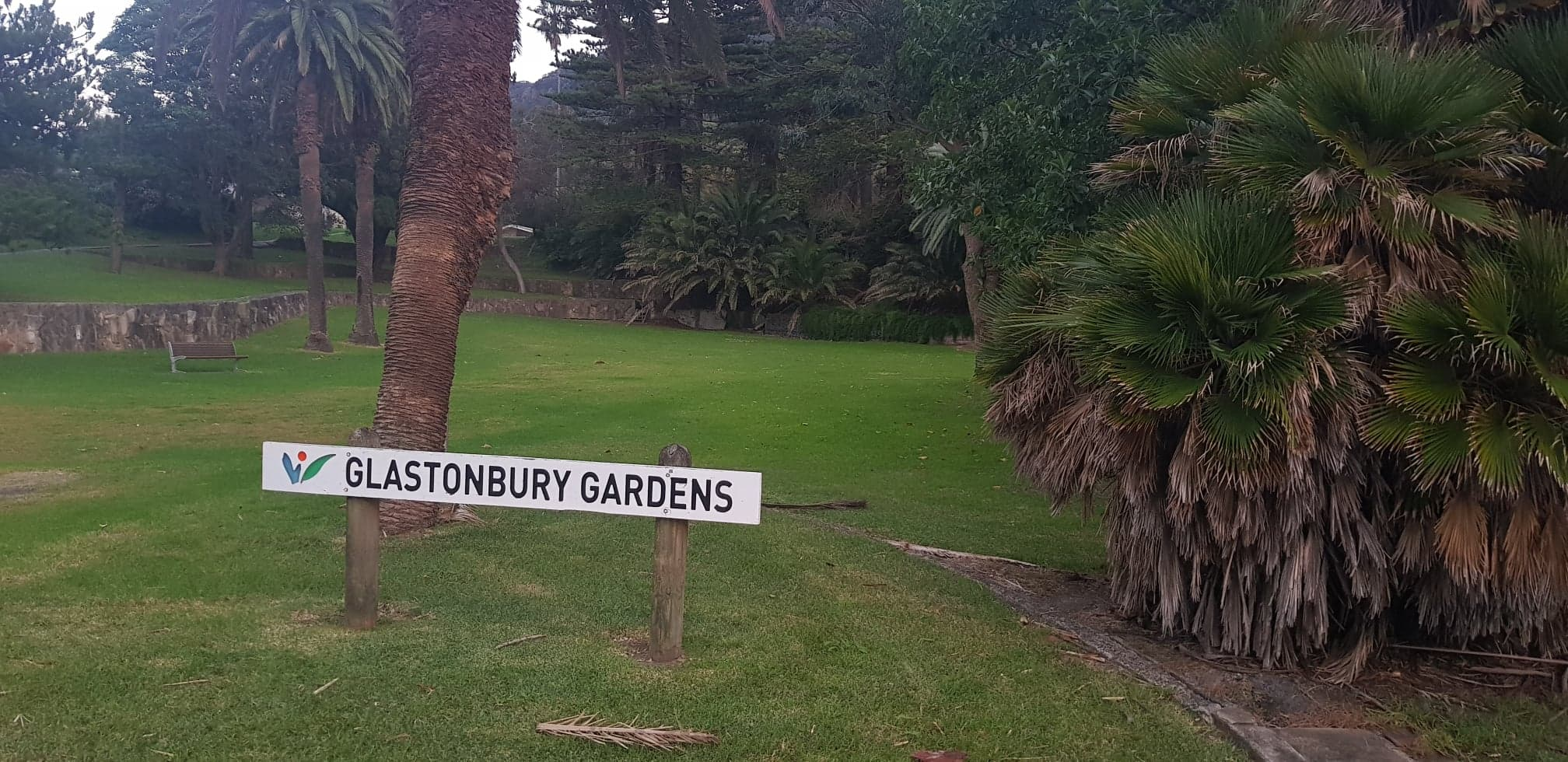
Glastonbury Gardens, Austinmer NSW, Australia

Established in 1965, the park is a historical part of Austinmer as it was the site for colliery dam. Adjacent to the Lawrence Hargrave Drive, the public park consists of Sabal palms, Norfolk Island pines (Araucaria heterophylla) and Canary Island date palm Phoenix canariensis. It was dedicated to Reg Glastonbury, the Wollongong City Council City Engineer from 1947 to 1962 and was named after him.

== Schools ==
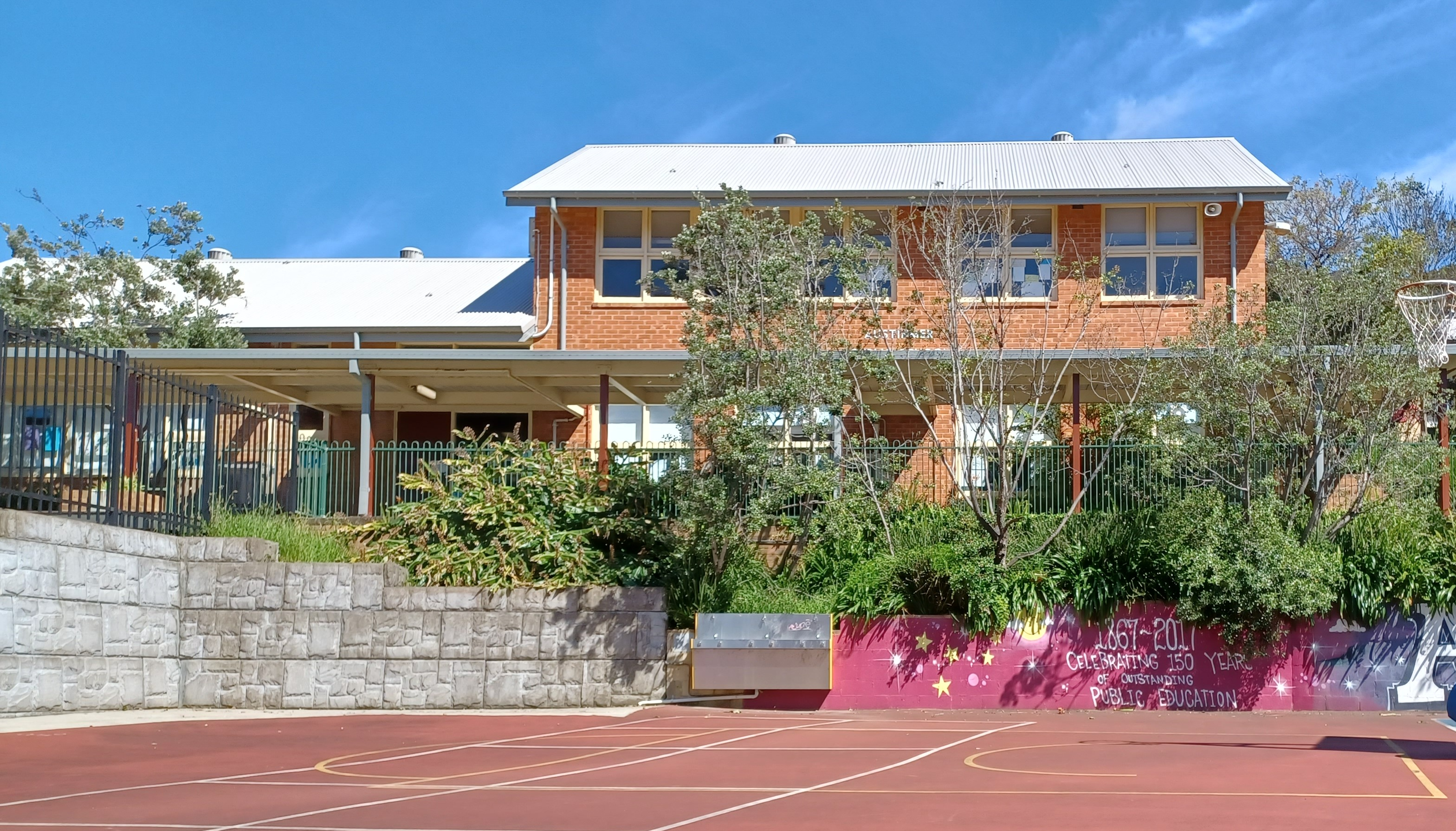
Austinmer Public School

- Austinmer Public School

== Churches ==
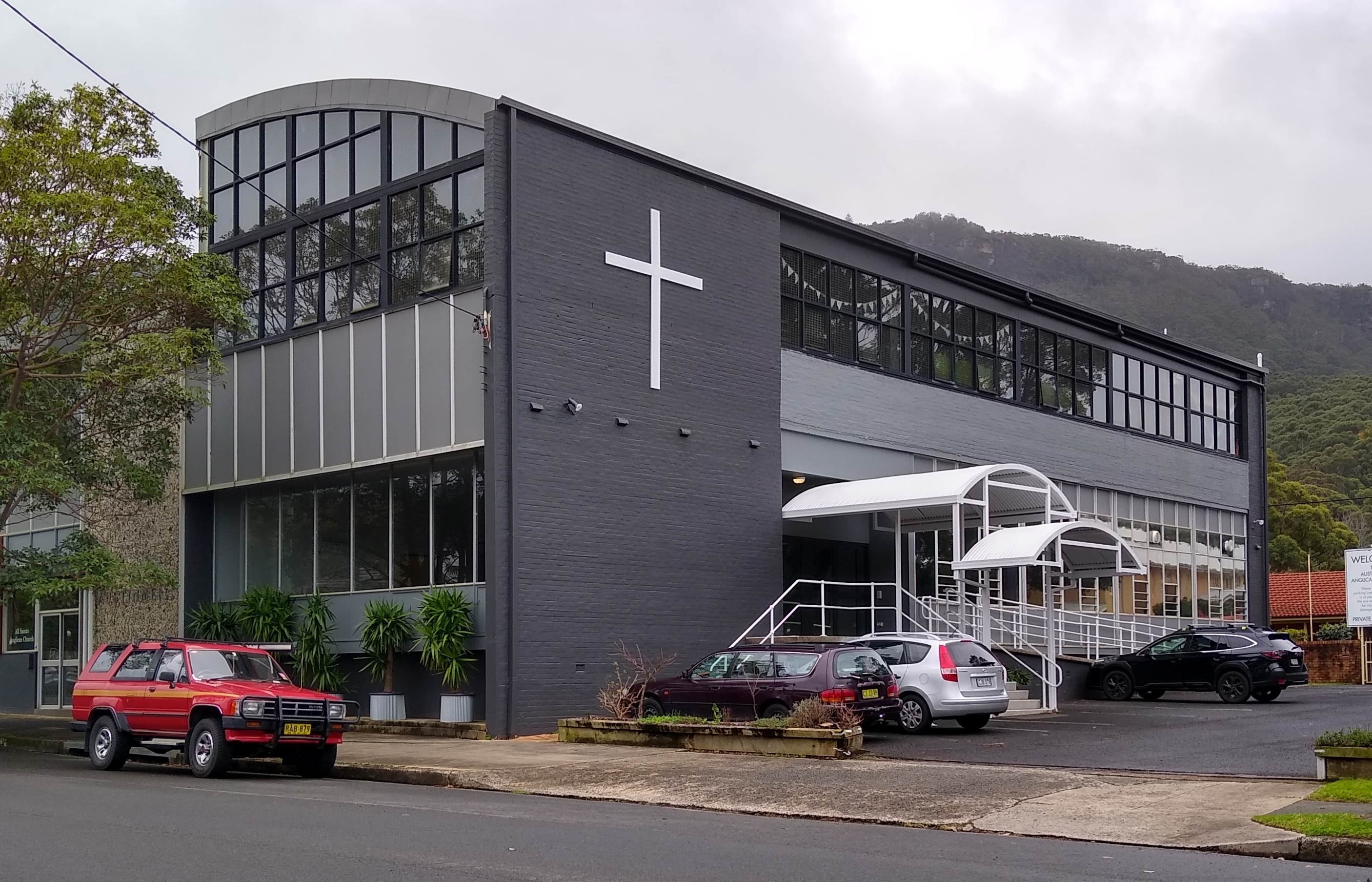
Austinmer Anglican Church

- All Saints Anglican Church

== Notable people ==
Notable people from or who have lived in Austinmer include:

- Sydney de Kantzow, co-founder of the Cathay Pacific Airline
- Frenchy, comedian and YouTuber.
- Juilee Pryor, street artist
