= Austinmer railway station =

Railway station in New South Wales, Australia

Austinmer
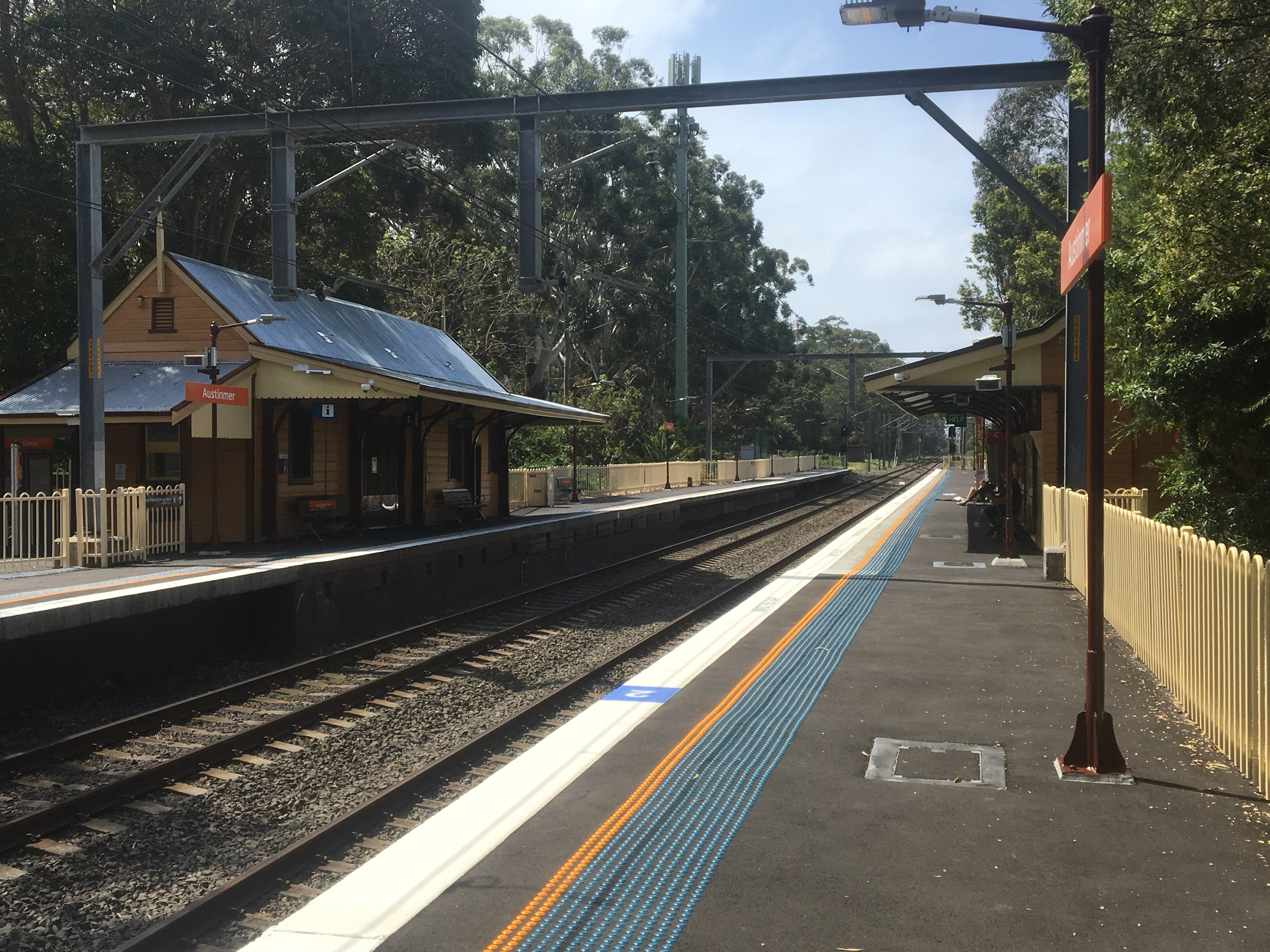
- Platforms in October 2019

General information
- Location: Railway Avenue, Austinmer; Australia
- Coordinates: 34°18′23″S 150°55′45″E
- Elevation: 21 metres (69 ft)
- Owner: Transport Asset Manager of New South Wales
- Operator: Sydney Trains
- Line: South Coast
- Distance: 68.59 kilometres (42.62 mi) from Central
- Platforms: 2 side
- Tracks: 2
- Connections: Bus

Construction
- Structure type: Ground
- Accessible: Assisted access

Other information
- Status: Weekdays: Staffed: 5.35am to 9.35am: Weekends and public holidays: Unstaffed
- Station code: AUR
- Website: Transport for NSW

History
- Opened: 1 September 1887

Passengers
- 2025: 46,810 (year); 128 (daily) (Sydney Trains, NSW TrainLink)

Services
Preceding station	Intercity Trains	Following station
Thirroul towards Kiama or Port Kembla	South Coast Line	Coledale towards Central or Bondi Junction
Location
- Location within New South Wales

Austinmer railway station is a heritage-listed railway station located on the South Coast railway line in New South Wales, Australia. It serves the northern Wollongong suburb of Austinmer. It was added to the New South Wales State Heritage Register on 2 April 1999.

== History ==
The name Austinmer came into official being in 1895. Originally, this area was called Sidmouth after the name of the house built there by Robert Marsh Westmacott in 1837. Sidmouth was the name of Robert Marsh Westmacott's hometown, in Devon, on the Channel coast of England. By the 1860s, a small rural settlement had developed in the area and was called North Bulli. The name changed to Austermere with the opening of the North Illawarra Coal Company's mine. As Sir John Leckey's estate at Moss Vale was also known by this name, the spelling Austinmere was adopted by the local newspapers in 1887. The name is linked to Henry Austin, one of the three Directors of the Board of the Illawarra Mining Company. When the railway platform was built in September 1887, the name Austinmer was placed upon it, omitting the final "e".

The station opened on 1 September 1887 as a single-line waiting station with an unattended single platform on the isolated Scarborough (Clifton) to Wollongong line in 1887 due to the difficulty being experienced in linking up with the Sydney to Waterfall section of the line. The connection was finally achieved with the single line to Waterfall being opened on 3 October 1888.

In November 1887, the year the station was built, the "Township of Austinmer" estate, a subdivision of a portion of the property of the North Illawarra Coal Coy., at North Bulli, Parish of Southend, County of Cumberland, was advertised for sale. Further subdivisions took place in 1906 (Kennedy's Estate, Austinmer); in 1913 The Very Cream of Austinmer 2nd subdivision was advertised as "Fronting the ocean, close to the railway station"; and in 1914, Austinmer 3rd subdivision was similarly advertised. Austinmer became known in the early 20th century as a fashionable holiday resort, the "Brighton of New South Wales".

The line was duplicated to Austinmer in 1915, resulting in the construction of the existing standard design timber buildings on each platform connected by a steel-framed overbridge. The works included the construction of the concrete arch overbridge for road traffic and the closure of the goods siding. In 1917, as part of the new Thirroul yard, the goods siding was transferred to the Nowra side of the overbridge that replaced the original level crossing at the Sydney end.

== Platforms and services ==
Austinmer has two side platforms and is serviced by Sydney Trains South Coast line services travelling between Waterfall and Port Kembla. Some peak hour and late night services operate to Sydney Central, Bondi Junction and Kiama.

Platform	Line	Stopping pattern	Notes
1	SCO	services to Waterfall peak hour, late night & weekend services to Sydney Central & Bondi Junction	
2	SCO	services to Thirroul & Port Kembla peak hour, late night & weekend services to Kiama	

== Transport links ==
Dion's Bus Service operates two routes via Austinmer station, under contract to Transport for NSW:

- 90: to Wollongong
- 91: to University of Wollongong

== Description ==
The station complex consists of type 11-design station buildings on Platform 1 and Platform 2, two platforms and the Hill Street overbridge, all of which date from 1915.

Austinmer Railway Station is located northeast of the Hill Street overbridge, between Gilchrist Street (southeast) and Railway Avenue (northwest). There are small car parks on both sides of the station. There is no footbridge, and therefore access between the platforms is via the Balfour Road overbridge. The setting of the railway station is heavily vegetated, with many mature trees adjacent to the station, some overhanging the platforms. The Austinmer platform buildings have been recently repainted in a heritage colour scheme (2009). The perimeter of the railway station is fenced with modern powder-coated aluminium pool fencing.

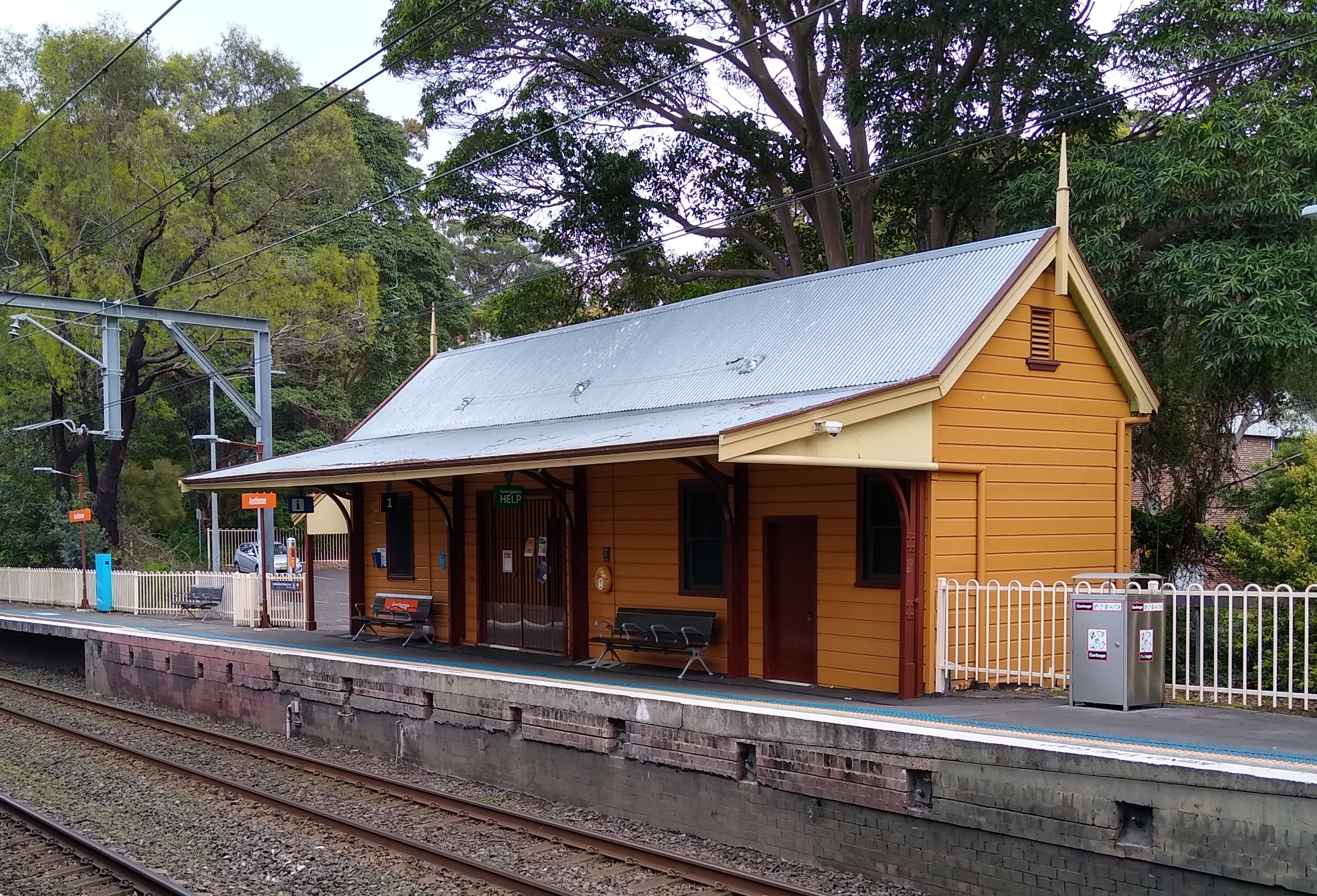
Platform 1 building

Platform 1 Building (1915)

This is the smaller west platform building. This is a weatherboard single storey building with a gabled corrugated steel roof, cantilevered awning on the platform (east) side on steel brackets mounted on steel posts. The gable ends to north and south have rectangular timber louvred vents. To the south end of the building is a skillion roofed awning, and the south elevation features two ticket windows, one of which has a rare original timber ticket window frame (though a later aluminium ticket window has been installed within and partly overlapping the original frame). The building has timber framed double hung windows, and features timber 4-panel doors with multipaned fanlights with square coloured glass panes.

Internally, the building was originally planned with a booking office, general waiting room, ladies room and ladies toilets, with a water tank at the southern end of the building. The building generally has timber weatherboard internal wall linings. The waiting area has a timber tongue & grooved board ceiling, modern steel double security doors, modern timber veneer wall panelling, modern floor tiling, a timber 4-panel internal door.

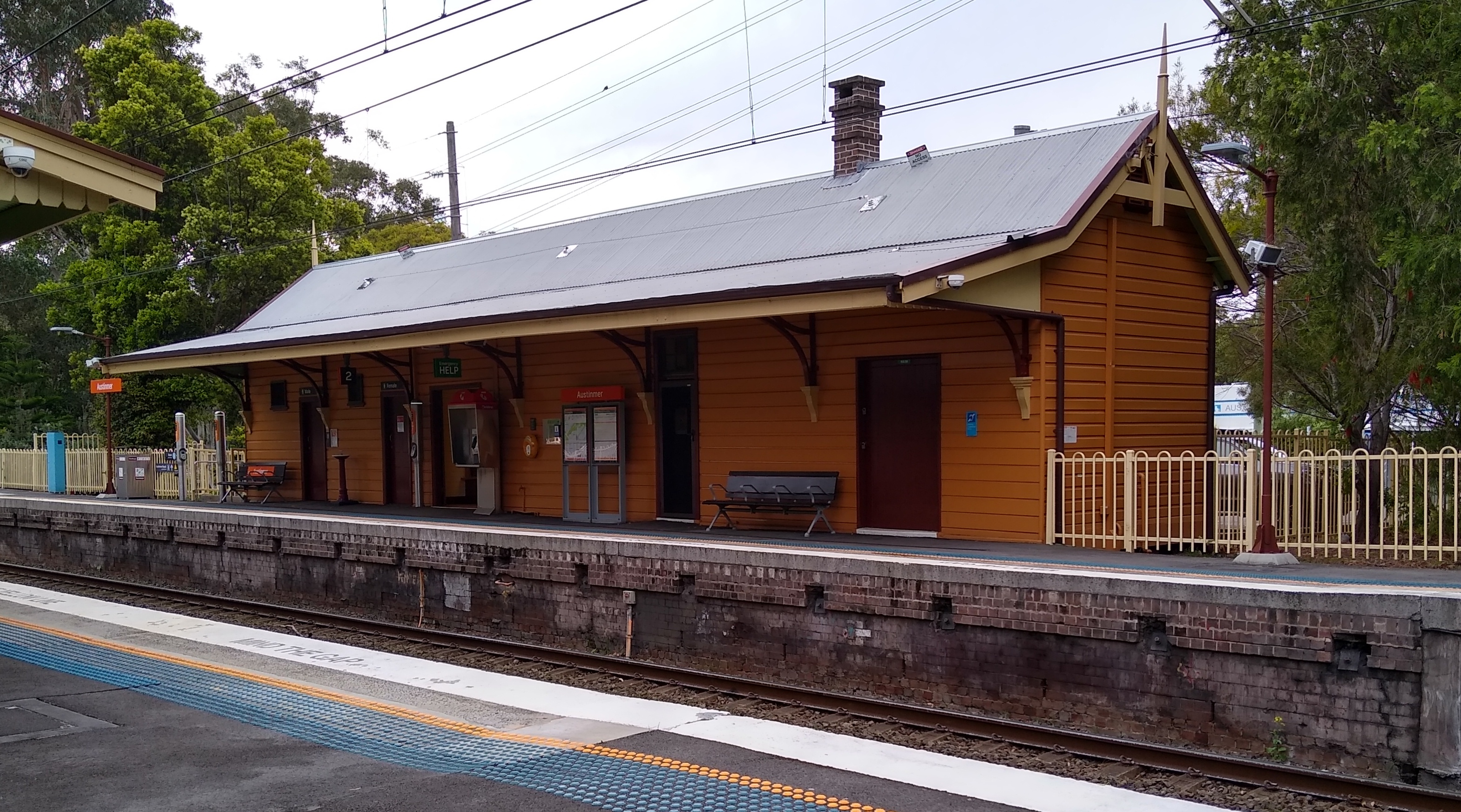
Platform 2 building

Platform 2 Building (1915)

This is the larger east platform building. This is a weatherboard single storey building with a corrugated steel gabled roof and a skillion roofed platform awning cantilevered on steel brackets mounted on decorative timber wall brackets. The gable ends to north and south have rectangular timber louvred vents. There is one brick chimney towards the southern end of the roof ridge. The building features large tongue & grooved timber sliding doors at the southern end, facing the platform, timber 4-panel doors with 6-paned fanlights with coloured glass panes. The building has exposed timber rafter ends. Windows are timber framed double hung with 9-paned top sashes with coloured glass panes.

Internally, this building was originally planned with gents and ladies toilets, a general waiting room, booking office and Out-of-room, and water tanks at each end. The waiting area has been modernised, with a modern ceiling and timber veneer panelling.

Platforms (1915)

Two perimeter platforms with asphalt surfaces. The platforms have brick edges with concrete capping in the central sections, with modern concrete platform extensions to the north ends of both platforms. Access between the platforms is via the Balfour Road overbridge.

Hill Street Overbridge (1915)

A brick arched overbridge at the southern end of the railway station. The bridge has brick abutments and a curved concrete arch.

Landscape/Natural Features

The station is sited within a leafy environment below the Illawarra escarpment. Large native trees provide an immediate backdrop to the station and the platform buildings. Views of the escarpment are available from the Hill Street overbridge and the station itself.

Condition

The station buildings, platforms and Hill Street overbridge were all reported to be in good condition as at 28 May 2009.

The platform buildings are externally intact, though altered internally. They have integrity as a pair of platform buildings from the 1915 reconstruction of the station.

=== Modifications and dates ===
- 1914–1915: entire station rebuilt
- 1985: brick platform raised
- 2008: Platform 1 building- brick chimney collapsed, removed and roof repaired

== Heritage listing ==
Austinmer Railway Station - including its platforms and platform buildings - is of State heritage significance as a rare example of a station with weatherboard platform buildings. Austinmer Railway Station is of historical significance as an early station (1887) on the Illawarra line, as an intact group of railway structures dating from the 1915 duplication of the Illawarra line, for its role in the naming of Austinmer, and as a transport hub for the village of Austinmer since 1887. Austinmer Railway Station is also of historical significance for its role in the development of Austinmer as a tourist resort since the early 20th century. The 1915 platform buildings at Austinmer Railway Station are of aesthetic significance as rare examples of Federation period weatherboard standard railway design platform buildings, and as a grouping of perimeter platforms, platform buildings and road overbridge which form a cohesive railway precinct within a significant landscape setting. The 1915 Hill Street overbridge is of technical significance as a bridge structure of this period with innovative use of concrete.

Austinmer railway station was listed on the New South Wales State Heritage Register on 2 April 1999 having satisfied the following criteria.

The place is important in demonstrating the course, or pattern, of cultural or natural history in New South Wales.

Austinmer Railway Station is of historical significance as an early station on the Illawarra line (1887), for its role in the naming of Austinmer, and as a transport hub for the village of Austinmer since 1887, though there are no physical remains from this period. Austinmer Railway Station is of historical significance as an intact group of railway structures dating from the 1915 duplication of the Illawarra line, and for its role in the development of Austinmer as a tourist resort since the early 20th century.

The place is important in demonstrating aesthetic characteristics and/or a high degree of creative or technical achievement in New South Wales.

The 1915 platform buildings at Austinmer Railway Station are of State aesthetic significance as rare examples of Federation period weatherboard standard platform buildings, and as a grouping of perimeter platforms and platform buildings and overbridge which form a cohesive railway precinct within a significant landscape setting. The 1915 Hill Street overbridge is of technical significance as a bridge structure of this period with innovative use of concrete.

The place has strong or special association with a particular community or cultural group in New South Wales for social, cultural or spiritual reasons.

The place has the potential to contribute to the local community's sense of place, and can provide a connection to the local community's past.

The place possesses uncommon, rare or endangered aspects of the cultural or natural history of New South Wales.

Austinmer is rare as one of only four stations on the Illawarra Line (Austinmer, Oatley, Penshurst and Thirroul) with weatherboard platform buildings, and (with Penshurst) has the most intact examples.

The place is important in demonstrating the principal characteristics of a class of cultural or natural places/environments in New South Wales.

Austinmer Railway Station is representative as a Federation period rural railway station, with weatherboard platform buildings, externally intact. The railway stations at Austinmer, Penshurst, Oatley and Thirroul on the Illawarra line have examples of this type of weatherboard platform building, with those at Austinmer and Penshurst being the most intact of these.
