= Scarborough, New South Wales =

Scarborough
- Suburb
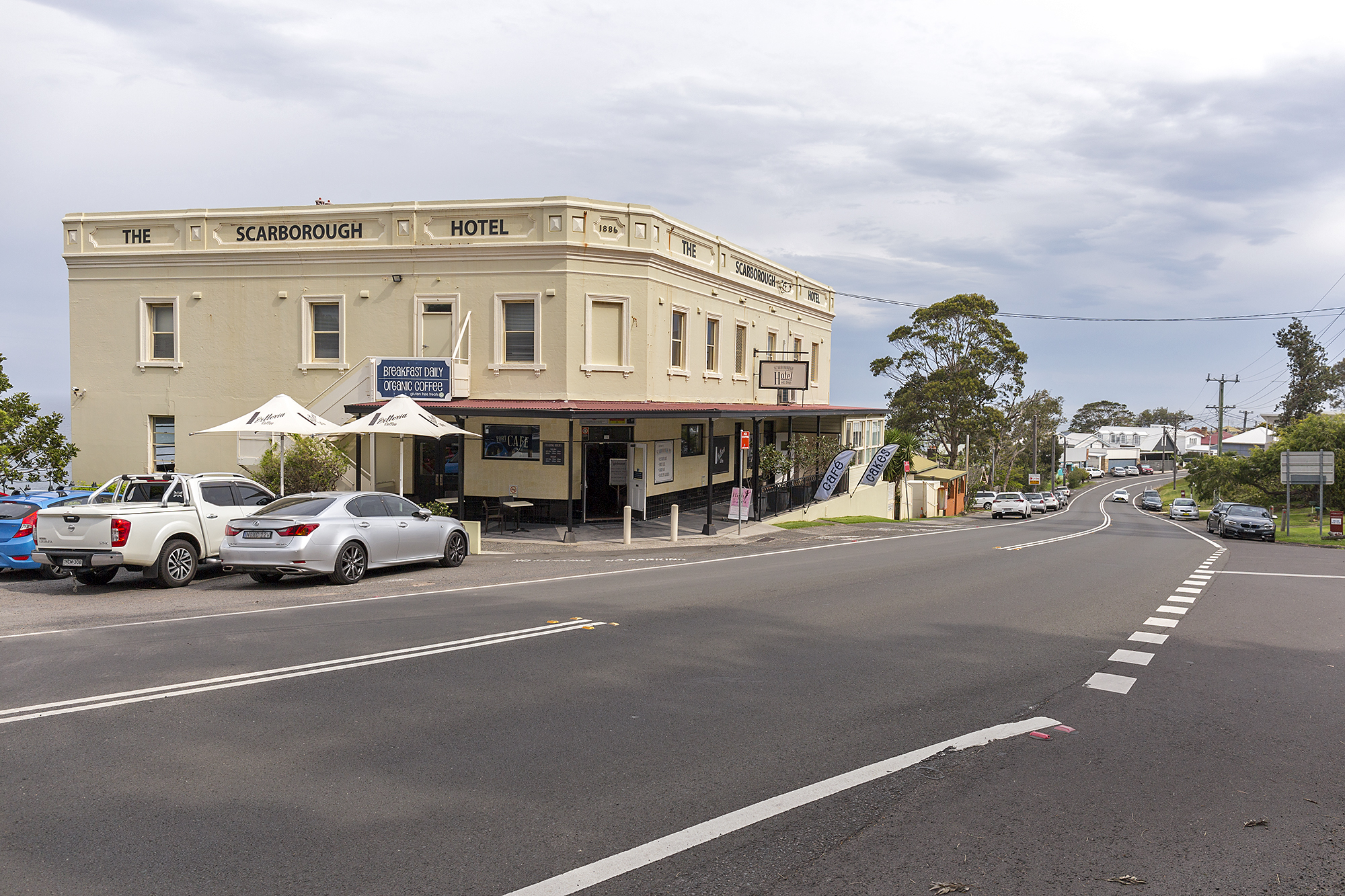
- Scarborough Hotel on Lawrence Hargrave Drive in 2018

- Coordinates: 34°16′14″S 150°57′37″E
- Country: Australia
- State: New South Wales
- City: Wollongong
- LGA: City of Wollongong
- Location: 65 km (40 mi) S of Sydney; 20 km (12 mi) N of Wollongong
- Established: 1903

Government
  - State electorate: Heathcote
  - Federal division: Cunningham
- Elevation: 78 m (256 ft)

Population
  - Total: 325 (2021 census)
- Postcode: 2515
Suburbs around Scarborough
	Clifton	Tasman Sea
Madden Plains	Scarborough	Tasman Sea
	Wombarra	Tasman Sea

Scarborough (/skɑːrbəroʊ/) is a small northern seaside suburb of Wollongong on the south coast of New South Wales, Australia. It sits in the northern Illawarra region on a narrow stretch between the Illawarra escarpment and sea cliffs.

== History ==
The Scarborough Hotel, opened in 1887, still stands. It was named the Scarborough Hotel at the time, before the name stuck to the town itself. The South Clifton (Scarborough) Mine was opened in 1891 by the Illawarra Coal Company, and closed in 1921. A new adit was established about 2 kilometres further south and this came to be known as South Clifton Tunnel Colliery. From 1898 to 1908 a post office was operated at the railway station. In 1913 construction began on a Clifton-Scarborough public school, and finished in 1914. It was opened by the Minister for Education of the time. From 1 January 1915, the Clifton Public School was renamed Scarborough Public School. In 1952, an employee at South Clifton Tunnel Colliery, said that the mine was under the control of the Operations Branch of the Joint Coal Board who were in the process of upgrading to enable it to supply the new Tallawarra Power Station then being built. In 1954 mechanical pillar extraction of coal commenced at Scarborough. In 1963 the jubilee of the school was celebrated.

== Heritage listings ==
Scarborough has a number of heritage-listed sites, including:

- First Street: Scarborough railway station

== Sport ==
Scarborough hosts a number of surfing competitions. It has a railway station and Scarborough Public School is the town's public primary school. The town used to be called South Clifton but in 1903, to avoid confusion between the railway stations, it was renamed. The escarpment behind Scarborough is approximately 300 metres above sea level.

Scarborough is home to the Northern Suburbs Rugby League Club known as the Bulldogs. The Bulldogs' home ground is the Jim Allen Oval located in Monash St, the same road as Scarborough Beach. The Norths Bulldogs as they are commonly known were runners up in the 2013 Illawarra Coal Shield Competition. The Bulldogs often see spectator numbers for home games easily surpass the 5000 mark.

Scarborough is also home to the Scarborough boardriders club and host a monthly surfing competition with notable big wave surfer Michael Tory being a participating member.

== See also ==
- Wollongong
