= Coledale railway station =

Railway station in New South Wales, Australia

Coledale
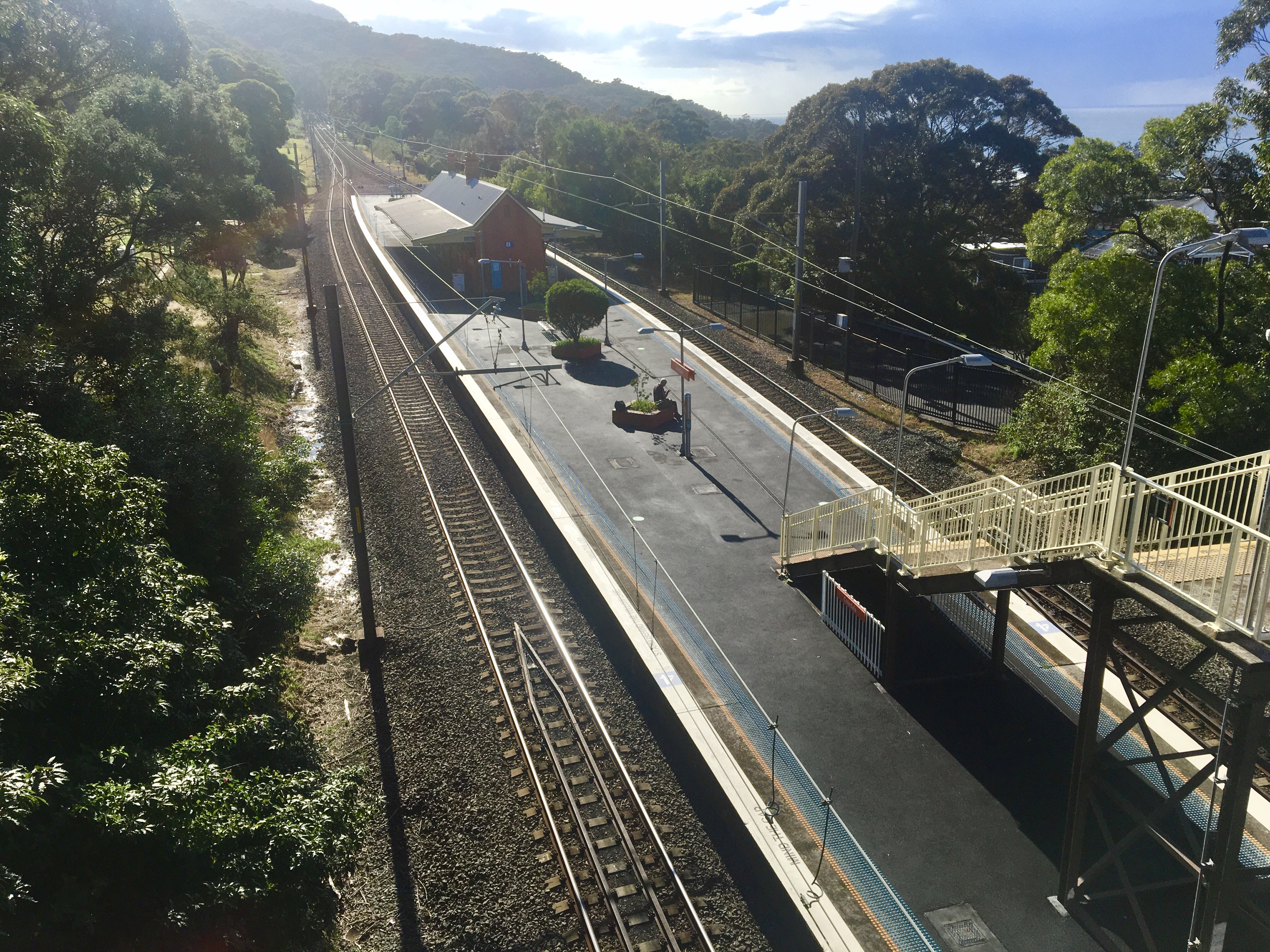
- Northbound view of Platform 2, July 2020

General information
- Location: Cater Street, Coledale; Australia
- Coordinates: 34°17′22″S 150°56′36″E
- Elevation: 40 metres (130 ft)
- Owner: Transport Asset Manager of New South Wales
- Operator: Sydney Trains
- Line: South Coast
- Distance: 66.23 kilometres (41.15 mi) from Central
- Platforms: 2 (1 island)
- Tracks: 2

Construction
- Structure type: Ground

Other information
- Station code: COL
- Website: Transport for NSW

History
- Opened: July 1902

Passengers
- 2023: 19,860 (year); 54 (daily) (Sydney Trains, NSW TrainLink)

Services
Preceding station	Intercity Trains	Following station
Austinmer towards Kiama or Port Kembla	South Coast Line	Wombarra towards Central or Bondi Junction
Location

Coledale railway station is a heritage-listed railway station located on the South Coast railway line in New South Wales, Australia. It serves the seaside village of Coledale opening in July 1902. The station building was built in 1915 when the line was duplicated.

== Platforms and services ==
Coledale has one island platform with two faces. It is serviced by Sydney Trains South Coast line services travelling between Waterfall and Port Kembla. Some peak hour and late night services operate to Sydney Central, Bondi Junction and Kiama.

Platform	Line	Stopping pattern	Notes
1	SCO	services to Waterfall peak hour, late night & weekend services to Sydney Central & Bondi Junction	
2	SCO	services to Thirroul & Port Kembla peak hour, late night & weekend services to Kiama	
