= Coledale, New South Wales =

Coledale
- Suburb
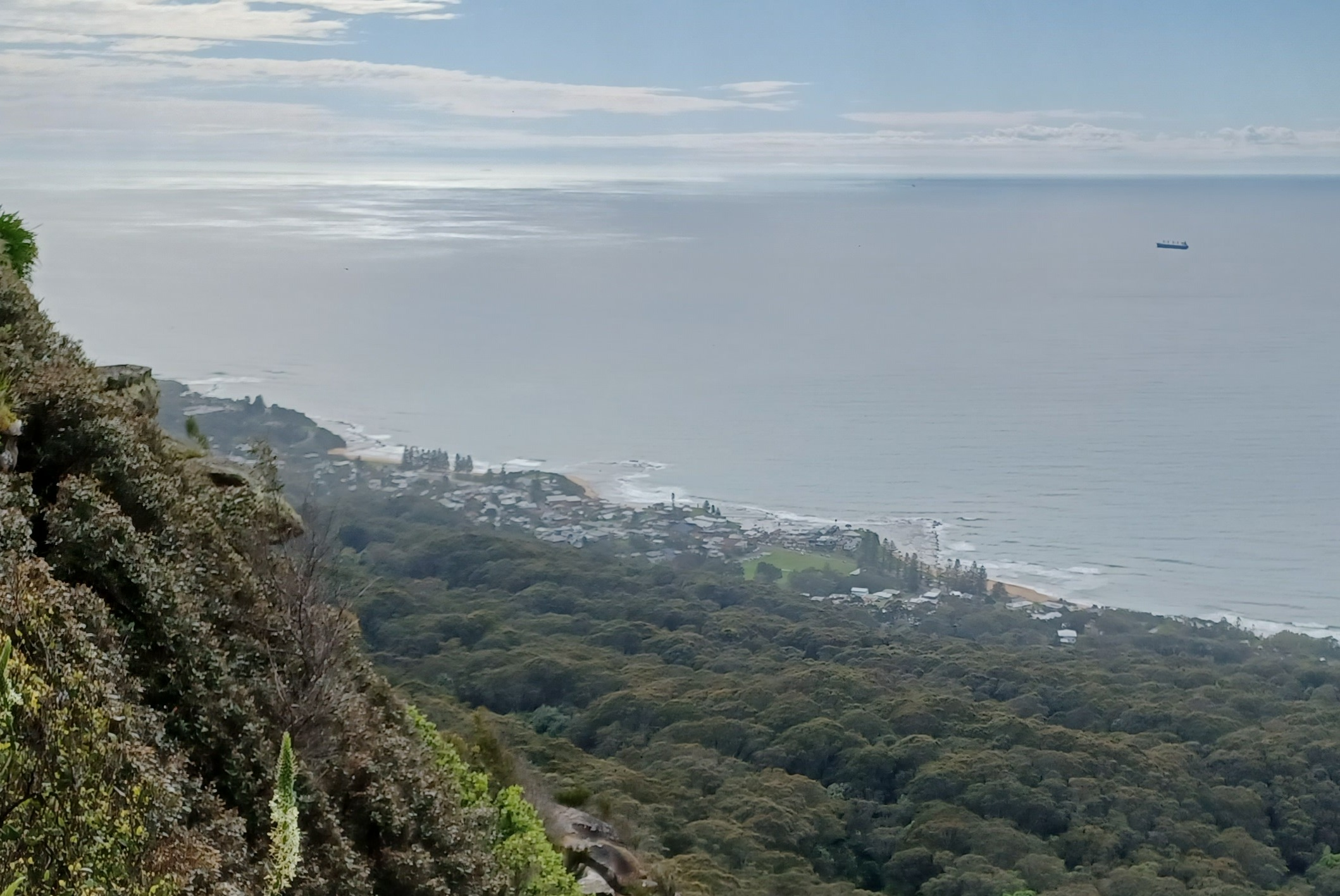
- A view of Coledale from Sublime Point

- Interactive map of Coledale
- Coordinates: 34°17′27″S 150°56′41″E
- Country: Australia
- State: New South Wales
- City: Wollongong
- LGA: City of Wollongong
- Location: 67 km (42 mi) South of Sydney; 17 km (11 mi) North of Wollongong

Government
  - State electorate: Heathcote
  - Federal division: Cunningham
- Elevation: 21 m (69 ft)

Population
  - Total: 1,372 (2021 census)
- Postcode: 2515
Suburbs around Coledale
		Wombarra
	Coledale
Austinmer

Coledale is a costal village in the Illawarra region of New South Wales, Australia, approximately 18 kilometres (11 mi) north of Wollongong and 52 kilometres (32 mi) south of the Sydney Central Business District. It is located along the Princes Highway and the South Coast railway line. Coledale is part of the City of Wollongong and lies between the villages of Wombarra and Austinmer.

Coledale hosts several businesses along Lawrence Hargrave Drive as well as a Returned and Services League (RSL) club, public hall, fire station, and public hospital. Coledale's shops include a newsagent and cafe, gift store, and homeware items shop. Other businesses include a beauty salon, hair dresser, fish & chip shop, bottle shop, and other cafes. Coledale also has a small public school.

Coledale also has a playing field for soccer, cricket and netball: St. James Park is the home ground for the Coledale Waves (formerly known as the Coledale Rosebuds) soccer teams, and was where Australian athlete Kerryn McCann trained.

== History ==
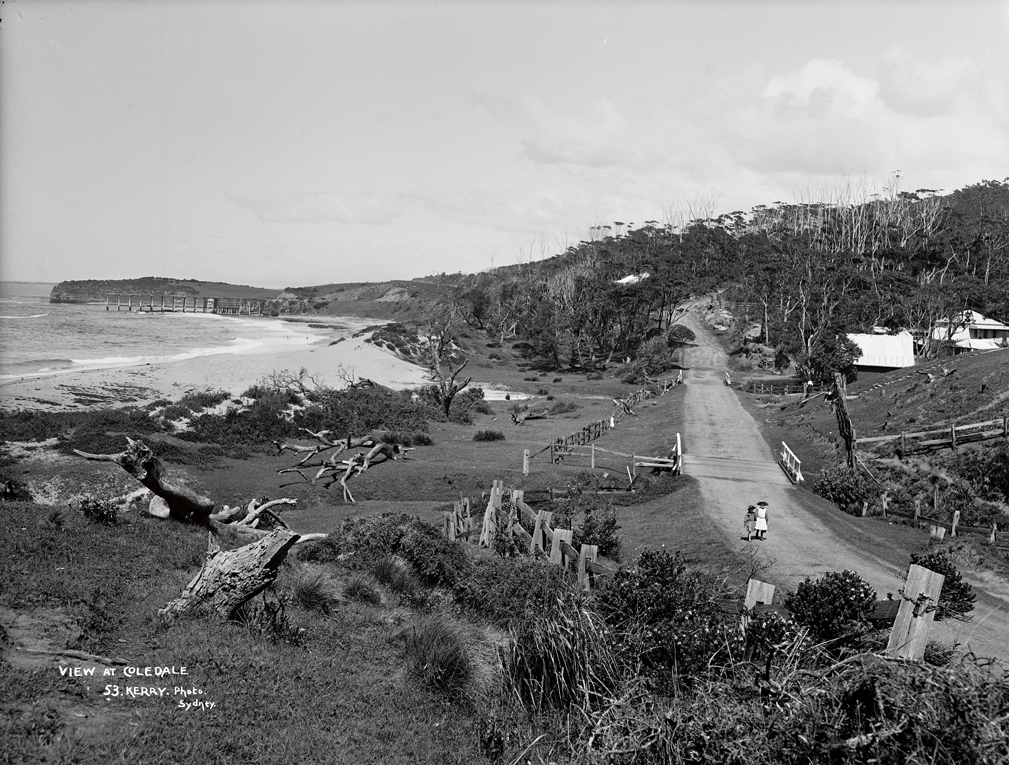
A view at Coledale, circa 1900.

The early development of Coledale and the surrounding areas of the Illawarra was largely due to the coal mining industry. The first mine in the area opened in 1889, but closed due to issues with groundwater. It was redeveloped in 1902 as the North Bulli Colliery, which closed in 1926. The mine employed around 100 workers.

== Population ==
In the 2021 census, there were 1,372 people in Coledale. 81.4% of people were born in Australia and 90.0% of people spoke only English at home. The most common responses for religion were No Religion (53.4%), Catholic (17.9%) and Anglican (11.2%).

== Recreation ==
Coledale has two sandy beaches, Coledale Beach and Sharkey's Beach (also Sharky Beach or Sharkies Beach). Coledale Beach is located to the north of the village and is patrolled during the summer months by the local surf life saving club (SLSC). Sharkey's Beach is a smaller, unpatrolled beach located to the south of the village. It is a popular area for surfing and fishing, and also hosts local markets every four weeks. The SLSC operates a nearby campground to receive funding.

== Infrastructure ==
=== Transport ===
Rail transport was first established in 1887, running between Coledale and Clifton, from which many colliery workers commuted by foot or horse before the opening of the railway. Services extended to Sydney and Wollongong in 1889. Coledale railway station is located halfway up Cater Street, off Lawrence Hargrave Drive. The station is operated by Sydney Trains. It is located on the South Coast railway line and receives South Coast (SCO) services from Central and Wollongong.

=== Hospital ===
Coledale Hospital opened in 1917, after construction began in 1915. It was originally named the Illawarra Cottage Hospital or Miner's Hospital and dealt with injuries from the nearby coal mines. The hospital, which initially had only 15 beds, was funded by both the government and fundraising efforts by local residents.

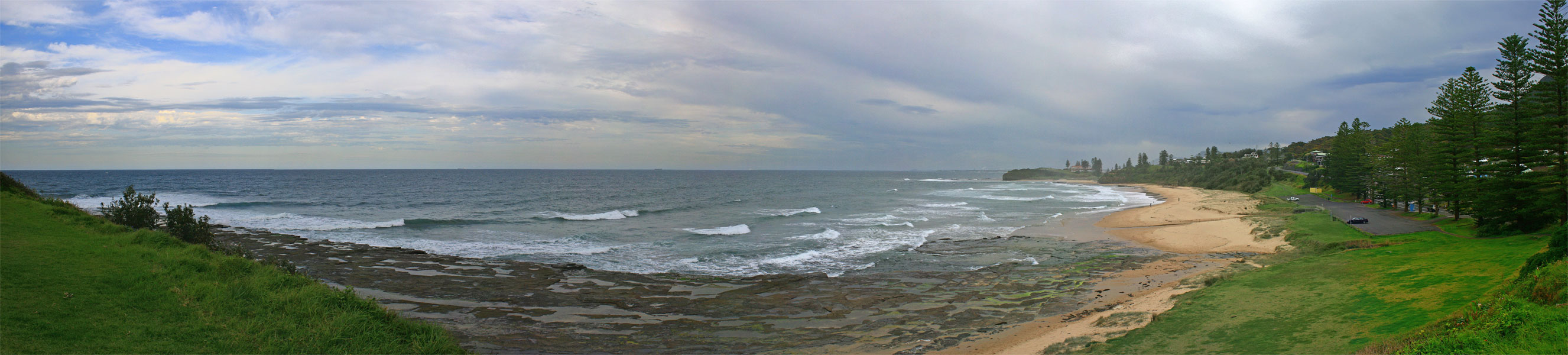
A panorama overlooking Sharkey's beach facing south in the direction of the Headlands Hotel, which is a 20-30 minute walk from the Coledale shops. There is also a cycle path that continues to Wollongong.
