= List of towns and cities in Australia by year of settlement =

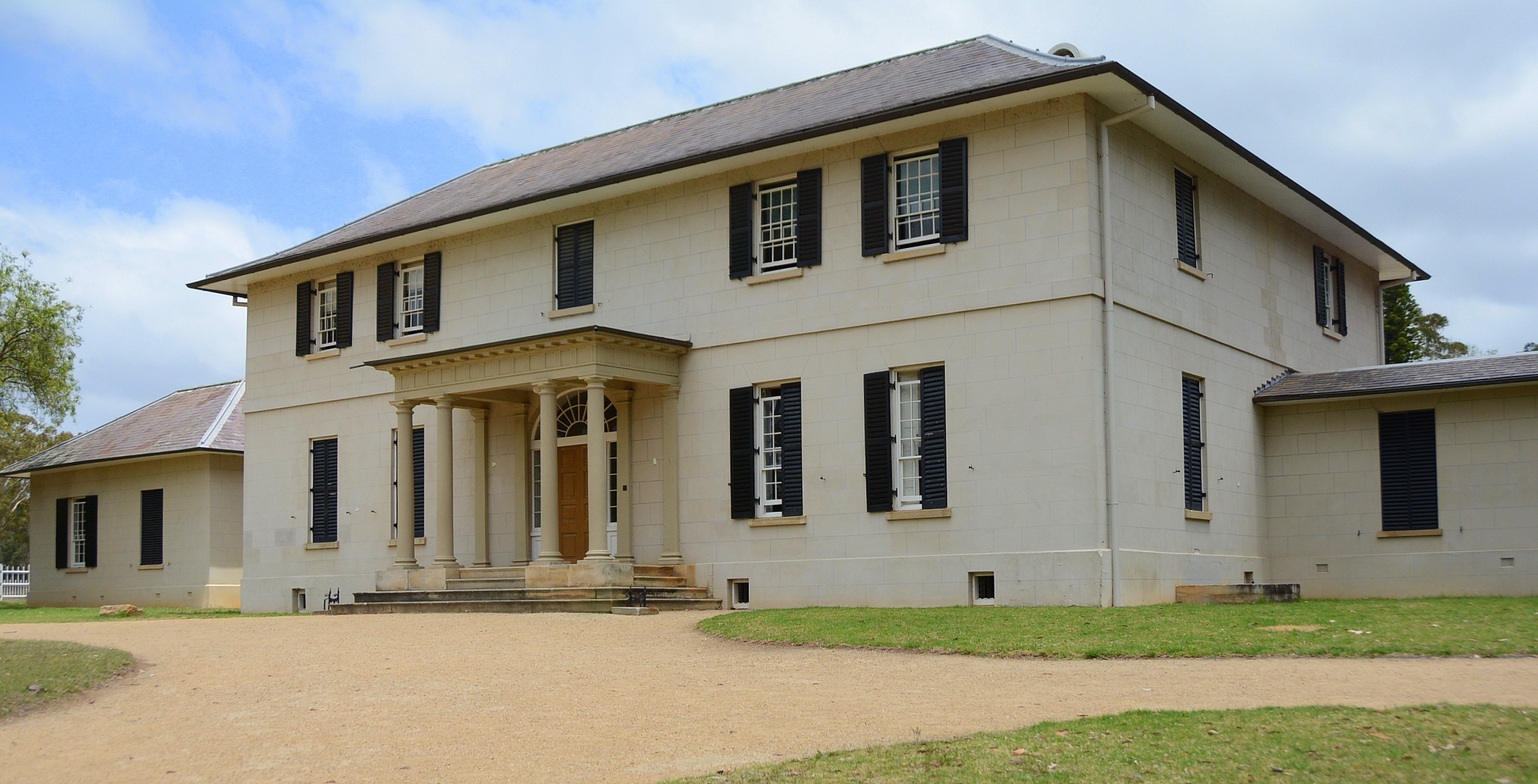
Old Government House, Parramatta, circa 1799

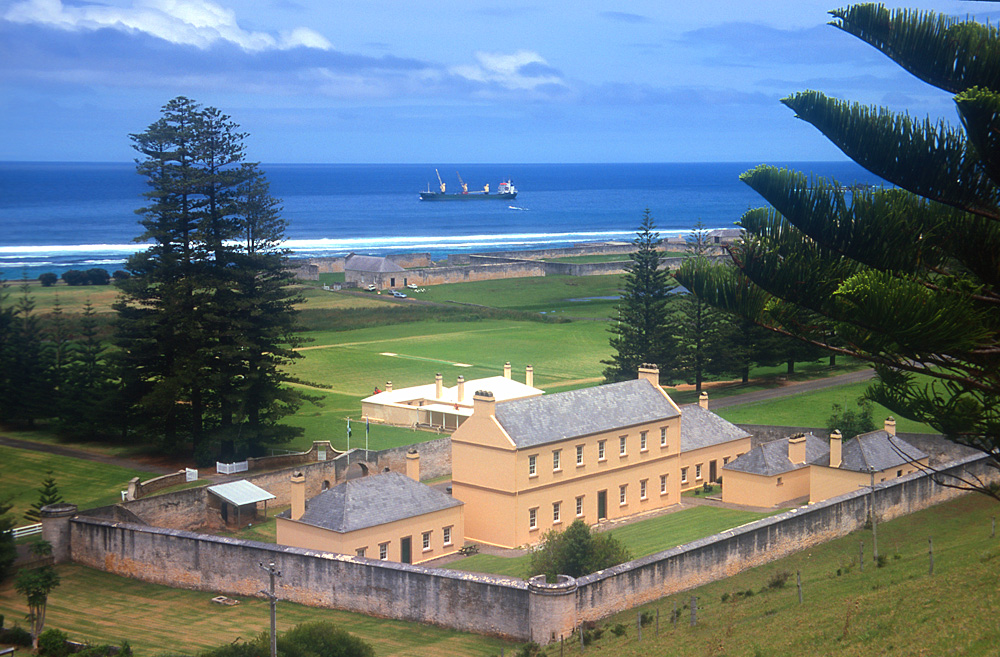
Old Military Barracks, now Legislative Assembly Chambers, Kingston, Norfolk Island

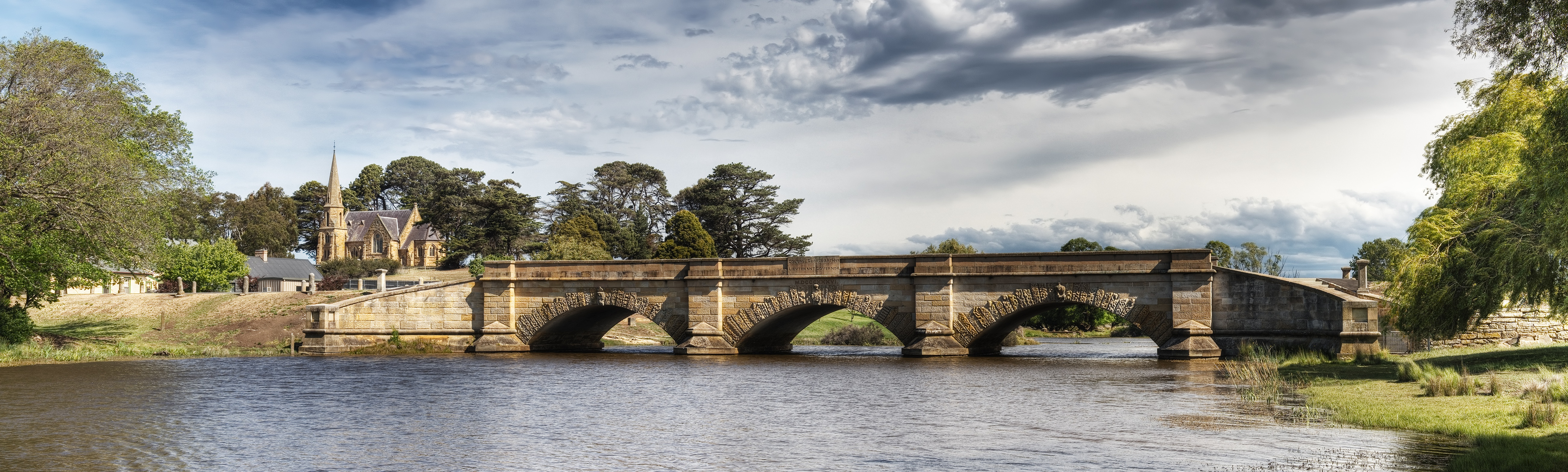
Historic Ross Bridge with the Uniting Church in the background

This is primarily a list of towns and cities in Australia by year of settlement. The article also contains information on permanent settlements established in Australia before British settlement commenced in 1788.

== Pre-European settlements ==
=== Australia proper ===
For 40,000–70,000 years, the Australian mainland and Tasmania have been inhabited by the Australian Aboriginal people, and the Torres Strait Islands (now part of Queensland) by Torres Strait Islanders. Aboriginal people were hunter-gatherers and fire stick farmers who travelled between seasonal settlements inside country boundaries. Many groups had more permanent camps that they lived in for much of the year. Torres Strait Islanders engaged in some agriculture and had permanent villages. In 1788, the British Empire began colonising Australia, constructing permanent towns and farms. Aboriginal people began living in permanent settlements, some by choice while others were forced.

=== External territories ===
The Cocos-Keeling Islands and Christmas Island have only been inhabited since the 1880s. Information for them can be found in the table below. Norfolk Island was first settled by Polynesians in the 13th or 14th century. In 1788 the British colonised the island, by that time the Polynesians had been gone for hundreds of years. Jervis Bay Territory is located on the Australian mainland and has two small villages. Prior to British settlement, the area was inhabited by Yuin aboriginal people. The Coral Sea Islands, Heard Island and McDonald Islands and the Australian Antarctic Territory have never had permanent inhabitants, but do have weather and research stations where people temporarily live and work. The Ashmore and Cartier Islands have never been inhabited, but are regularly visited by traditional Indonesian fishers.

=== Former territories ===
From 1947 to 1966, Australia administered the island of Nauru, which has been inhabited for at least three thousand years. The Nauruan people traditionally lived in permanent villages. Nauru is now an independent sovereign country formally called the Republic of Nauru. Australia governed the Territory of New Guinea (1920–1941), Territory of Papua (1902–1945) and then the Territory of Papua and New Guinea (1945–1979), which were all located on the island of New Guinea. Many of the native Papuan people traditionally lived in permanent settlements. In 1979 these territories became the independent sovereign country of Papua New Guinea.

== 18th century ==
Year	Town/City	State/Territory	Notes
1788	Sydney	New South Wales	First permanent Australian city. Largest city in Australia, capital of New South Wales.
1788	Parramatta	New South Wales	Second-oldest settlement in Australia. Now a part of the Sydney urban area.
1788	Kingston	Norfolk Island	Island settled as part of the Colony of New South Wales. It is now a separate territory of Australia.
1791	Windsor	New South Wales	Part of the City of Hawkesbury and Sydney urban area
1794	Richmond	New South Wales	Originally known as Richmond Hill, which is part of the City of Hawkesbury and Sydney urban area
1794	Pitt Town Bottoms	New South Wales	Originally known as Mulgrave Place. Part of the City of Hawkesbury.
1798	Liverpool	New South Wales	Now part of the greater Sydney metro area.

== 19th century ==
=== 1800s ===
Year	Town/City	State/Territory	Notes
1801	Newcastle	New South Wales	Original settlement abandoned in 1802. Resettled in 1804.
1803	Hobart	Tasmania	Hobart is Australia's second oldest capital city. Largest city and capital of Tasmania. Originally settled at Risdon Cove, the settlement was moved to Sullivans Cove in 1804.
1803	George Town	Tasmania	
1806	Launceston	Tasmania	
1807	New Norfolk	Tasmania	
1808	Sorell	Tasmania	

=== 1810s ===
Year	Town/City	State/Territory	Notes
1812	Ross	Tasmania	
1813	Longford	Tasmania	
1814	Bathurst	New South Wales	Oldest inland settlement in Australia
1815	Blackheath	New South Wales	
1817	Shellharbour	New South Wales	
1818	Penrith	New South Wales	

=== 1820s ===
Year	Town/City	State/Territory	Notes
1820s	Singleton	New South Wales	
1820	Campbelltown	New South Wales	Now part of the greater Sydney metro area.
1820	Maitland	New South Wales	
1821	Morpeth	New South Wales	
1821	Port Macquarie	New South Wales	
1821	Mudgee	New South Wales	
1821	Perth	Tasmania	
1822	Bothwell	Tasmania	
1823	Gosford	New South Wales	One of the two mergers of the Central Coast with Wyong
1823	Richmond	Tasmania	
1823	Wellington	New South Wales	
1824	Redcliffe	Queensland	First European settlement in Queensland
1825	Brisbane	Queensland	Largest city and capital of Queensland.
1826	King George's Sound (Albany)	Western Australia	Oldest settlement in the western half of Australia
1826	Burrangong Station (Young)	New South Wales	Settled as Burrangong Station, in Lambing Flat. Gazetted as Young in the 1860s.
1827	Burnie	Tasmania	Settled as Emu Bay, renamed in the early 1840s to Burnie after William Burnie.
1827	Oceania House, Home Island	Cocos-Keeling Islands	The islands were uninhabited prior to 1827. They became a territory of Australia in 1955.
1827	Tarago	New South Wales	
1829	Clarence	Western Australia	Abandoned in the early 1830s.
1829	Fremantle	Western Australia	
1829	Perth	Western Australia	Established as Swan River Colony. Largest city and capital of Western Australia.
1829	Guildford	Western Australia	

=== 1830s ===
Year	Town/City	State/Territory	Notes
1830	Augusta	Western Australia	
1830	Berrima	New South Wales	
1830	Port Arthur	Tasmania	
1831	Mandurah	Western Australia	
1831	Taree	New South Wales	
1832	Busselton	Western Australia	
1833	Northam	Western Australia	
1833	Goulburn	New South Wales	First Inland city
1833	Muswellbrook	New South Wales	
1834	Portland	Victoria	Oldest European settlement in Victoria.
1834	Wollongong	New South Wales	
1834	Pinjarra	Western Australia	
1835	York	Western Australia	
1835	Melbourne	Victoria	Second-largest city in Australia and capital of Victoria.
1836	Adelaide	South Australia	Largest city and capital of South Australia.
1836	Bunbury	Western Australia	
1836	Gawler	South Australia	
1836	Holbrook	New South Wales	
1836	Kempsey	New South Wales	
1836	Kingscote	South Australia	Oldest European settlement in South Australia
1836	Littlehampton	South Australia	
1836	Sunbury	Victoria	
1836	Wauchope	New South Wales	
1837	Bungendore	New South Wales	
1837	Colo Vale	New South Wales	
1837	Dandenong	Victoria	Now part of the greater Melbourne metro area.
1837	Southport	Tasmania	Most southern township in Australia.
1837	Yass	New South Wales	
1838	Buninyong	Victoria	
1838	Geelong	Victoria	
1838	Gundagai	New South Wales	
1838	Queanbeyan	New South Wales	
1839	Albury	New South Wales	
1839	Braidwood	New South Wales	
1839	Echunga	South Australia	
1839	Gumeracha	South Australia	
1839	Hahndorf	South Australia	
1839	Mount Barker	South Australia	
1839	Port Lincoln	South Australia	
1839	Seymour	Victoria	
1839	Thebarton	South Australia	

=== 1840s ===
Year	Town/City	State/Territory	Notes
1840s	Benalla	Victoria	
1840s	Dalby	Queensland	
1840s	Traralgon	Victoria	
1840s	Toowoomba	Queensland	
1840s	Ulladulla	New South Wales	
1840s	Wee Waa	New South Wales	
1840	Macclesfield	South Australia	
1840	Melrose	South Australia	Oldest town in the Flinders Ranges.
1840	Oakbank	South Australia	
1842	Ballina	New South Wales	
1842	Caboolture	Queensland	
1842	Horsham	Victoria	
1842	Kapunda	South Australia	
1842	Lobethal	South Australia	
1843	Boydtown	New South Wales	
1843	Eden	New South Wales	
1843	Wangaratta	Victoria	
1844	Bacchus Marsh	Victoria	
1844	Tweed Heads	New South Wales	
1844	Wingham	New South Wales	
1845	Jimboomba	Queensland	
1845	Port Pirie	South Australia	
1845	Burra	South Australia	
1846	Cowra	New South Wales	
1846	Grafton	New South Wales	
1846	Ipswich	Queensland	
1846	Orange	New South Wales	
1846	Swan Hill	Victoria	
1847	Temora	New South Wales	
1847	Maryborough	Queensland	
1847	Rockingham	Western Australia	
1847	Wagga Wagga	New South Wales	
1848	Birdwood	South Australia	Originally named Blumberg.
1848	Nanango	Queensland	
1849	Armidale	New South Wales	
1849	Cooma	New South Wales	
1849	Dubbo	New South Wales	
1849	Gayndah	Queensland	
1849	Surat	Queensland	

=== 1850s ===
Year	Town/City	State/Territory	Notes
1850s	Boggabri	New South Wales	
1850s	Casino	New South Wales	
1850s	Woodside	South Australia	
1850	Cessnock	New South Wales	
1850	Deniliquin	New South Wales	
1850	Geraldton	Western Australia	
1850	Meadows	South Australia	
1850	Warwick	Queensland	
1850	Tamworth	New South Wales	
1851	Bega	New South Wales	
1851	Bendigo	Victoria	
1851	Ballarat	Victoria	
1851	Castlemaine	Victoria	
1851	Hamilton	Victoria	
1851	Horsham	Victoria	
1851	Moama	New South Wales	
1851	Sale	Victoria	
1851	Tenterfield	New South Wales	
1852	Bordertown	South Australia	
1852	Daylesford	Victoria	
1852	Glen Innes	New South Wales	
1852	Lismore	New South Wales	
1852	Mount Gambier	South Australia	
1852	Nowra	New South Wales	
1852	Port Augusta	South Australia	
1852	Port Elliot	South Australia	
1852	Walcha	New South Wales	
1852	Wodonga	Victoria	
1853	Beechworth	Victoria	
1853	Goolwa	South Australia	
1853	Stawell	Victoria	
1853	Currajong (Parkes)	New South Wales	Originally founded as Currajong, but known as "Bushman's". Renamed to Parkes in 1873.
1853	Port Gregory	Western Australia	
1854	Colac	Victoria	
1854	Camperdown	Victoria	
1854	Devonport	Tasmania	
1854	Echuca	Victoria	
1854	Gladstone	Queensland	
1854	Stirling	South Australia	
1854	Tinonee	New South Wales	
1854	Yamba	New South Wales	
1855	Gatton	Queensland	
1855	Samford	Queensland	
1855	Warrnambool	Victoria	
1856	Gunnedah	New South Wales	
1856	Inverell	New South Wales	
1856	Quirindi	New South Wales	
1857	Ararat	Victoria	
1857	Ulverstone	Tasmania	
1858	Chiltern	Victoria	
1858	Laidley	Queensland	
1858	Rockhampton	Queensland	
1858	Corowa	New South Wales	
1859	Allora	Queensland	
1859	Barmera	South Australia	
1859	Hay	New South Wales	
1859	Scottsdale	Tasmania	
1859	Walgett	New South Wales	

=== 1860s ===
Year	Town/City	State/Territory	Notes
1860s	Glenrowan	Victoria	
1860s	Mangalore	Victoria	
1860	Bairnsdale	Victoria	
1860	Barnawartha	Victoria	
1860	Shepparton	Victoria	
1860	Narrabri	New South Wales	
1861	Cootamundra	New South Wales	Officially settled in 1847 as a stock run, incorporated in 1861.
1861	Bowen	Queensland	
1861	Bowral	New South Wales	
1861	Forbes	New South Wales	
1861	Moss Vale	New South Wales	
1862	Inglewood	Queensland	
1862	Moree	New South Wales	
1862	St George	Queensland	
1862	Tharwa	Australian Capital Territory	Oldest official settlement in the Australian Capital Territory
1863	Cossack	Western Australia	First town in northwest Australia
1863	Springsure	Queensland	
1863	Tambo	Queensland	Oldest town in western Queensland
1863	Victor Harbor	South Australia	
1863	Walhalla	Victoria	
1864	Clermont	Queensland	
1864	Northampton	Western Australia	
1864	Ingham	Queensland	
1864	Mitchell	Queensland	
1864	Somerset	Queensland	No longer inhabited.
1865	Burketown	Queensland	
1865	Charleville	Queensland	
1865	Roebourne	Western Australia	
1865	Townsville	Queensland	
1866	Beenleigh	Queensland	
1866	Mount Victoria	New South Wales	
1867	Cloncurry	Queensland	
1867	Nambucca Heads	New South Wales	
1867	Normanton	Queensland	
1867	Roma	Queensland	
1868	Bridgetown	Western Australia	
1868	Cunnamulla	Queensland	
1868	Gympie	Queensland	
1868	Yeppoon	Queensland	
1869	Bourke	New South Wales	
1869	Darwin	Northern Territory	Largest city and capital of the Northern Territory.
1869	Walla Walla	New South Wales	

=== 1870s ===
Year	Town/City	State/Territory	Notes
1870s	Beaudesert	Queensland	
1870s	Coffs Harbour	New South Wales	
1870s	Eucla	Western Australia	
1870	Gulgong	New South Wales	
1870s	Lithgow	New South Wales	
1870s	Mackay	Queensland	
1870s	Morwell	Victoria	
1870	Bellingen	New South Wales	
1870	Bundaberg	Queensland	
1870	Cobar	New South Wales	Name derives from the Ngiyambaa language of the Wangaibon and Weilwan peoples.
1870	Hughenden	Queensland	
1870	Medlow Bath	New South Wales	
1870	Nagambie	Victoria	
1870	Nambour	Queensland	
1870	Oakey	Queensland	
1870	Yandina	Queensland	
1871	Charters Towers	Queensland	
1871	Cossack	Western Australia	
1871	Forsayth	Queensland	
1871	Landsborough	Queensland	
1871	Tewantin	Queensland	
1872	Adelaide River	Northern Territory	
1872	Alice Springs	Northern Territory	Second-largest city in the Northern Territory
1872	Condon	Western Australia	Abandoned 1927, in favour of Port Hedland
1872	Esk	Queensland	
1872	Forster	New South Wales	
1872	Lowood	Queensland	
1872	Stanthorpe	Queensland	
1873	Cooktown	Queensland	
1874	Southport	Queensland	
1876	Cairns	Queensland	
1876	Crows Nest	Queensland	
1876	Kyabram	Victoria	
1876	Pittsworth	Queensland	
1876	Winton	Queensland	
1877	Chinchilla	Queensland	
1877	Mareeba	Queensland	
1877	Warragul	Victoria	
1878	Farina	South Australia	
1878	Killarney	Queensland	
1878	Miles	Queensland	
1879	Boulia	Queensland	
1879	Dunsborough	Western Australia	
1879	Emerald	Queensland	
1879	Innisfail	Queensland	
1879	Katoomba	New South Wales	
1879	Moe	Victoria	

=== 1880s ===
Year	Town/City	State/Territory	Notes
1880s	Canungra	Queensland	
1880s	Gordonvale	Queensland	
1880	Milparinka	New South Wales	
1882	Ayr	Queensland	
1882	Boonah	Queensland	
1882	Hall	Australian Capital Territory	
1882	Mount Morgan	Queensland	
1883	Broken Hill	New South Wales	
1883	Broome	Western Australia	
1883	Caloundra	Queensland	
1883	Captains Flat	New South Wales	
1883	Carnarvon	Western Australia	
1883	Coolangatta	Queensland	
1883	Derby	Western Australia	
1883	Edmonton	Queensland	
1883	Narromine	New South Wales	
1884	Alpha	Queensland	
1884	Camooweal	Queensland	
1884	Karridale	Western Australia	
1884	Wyalong	New South Wales	
1885	Barcaldine	Queensland	
1885	Batemans Bay	New South Wales	
1885	Childers	Queensland	
1885	Cooroy	Queensland	
1885	Guyra	New South Wales	
1885	Old Onslow	Western Australia	Abandoned in 1925.
1885	Wallangarra	Queensland	
1886	Wyndham	Western Australia	
1887	Birdsville	Queensland	
1887	Blackbutt	Queensland	
1887	Eidsvold	Queensland	
1887	Mildura	Victoria	
1887	Mittagong	New South Wales	
1887	Southern Cross	Western Australia	
1888	Flying Fish Cove	Christmas Island	Island was uninhabited prior to 1888. Became a territory of Australia in 1958.
1888	Goondiwindi	Queensland	
1888	Kilcoy	Queensland	
1888	Kuranda	Queensland	
1888	Longreach	Queensland	
1888	North Star	New South Wales	
1888	Uranquinty	New South Wales	
1888	Woolgoolga	New South Wales	
1889	Nannup	Western Australia	

=== 1890s ===
Year	Town/City	State/Territory	Notes
1890s	Kingaroy	Queensland	
1890s	Margaret River	Western Australia	
1890s	Mount Hope	New South Wales	
1890	Eumundi	Queensland	
1890	Innamincka	South Australia	
1890	Oodnadatta	South Australia	
1890	Tarcutta	New South Wales	
1891	Maleny	Queensland	
1892	Bomaderry	New South Wales	
1892	Coolgardie	Western Australia	
1893	Kalgoorlie	Western Australia	
1893	Tuncurry	New South Wales	
1895	Norseman	Western Australia	
1895	Waroona	Western Australia	
1896	Esperance	Western Australia	
1896	Port Hedland	Western Australia	
1897	Gwalia	Western Australia	Abandoned.
1898	Katanning	Western Australia	
1898	Waverley	Western Australia	
1899	Quindalup	Western Australia	

== 20th century ==
Year	Town/City	State/Territory	Notes
1900s	Fitzroy Crossing	Western Australia	
1901	Tarcoola	South Australia	
1904	Kyogle	New South Wales	
1904	Renmark	South Australia	
1908	Maroochydore	Queensland	
1910	Dwellingup	Western Australia	
1910	Koojan	Western Australia	
1910	Wonthaggi	Victoria	
1911	Berri	South Australia	
1911	Batchelor	Northern Territory	
1913	Canberra	Australian Capital Territory	Largest inland city, capital of the Australian Capital Territory and of Australia.
1913	Leeton	New South Wales	
1915	Coober Pedy	South Australia	
1916	Griffith	New South Wales	
1917	Quilpie	Queensland	
1919	Yerrinbool	New South Wales	
1920	Port Augusta	South Australia	
1920	Whyalla	South Australia	
1921	Monash	South Australia	
1922	Tin Can Bay	Queensland	Originally known as Wallu.
1923	Mount Isa	Queensland	
1924	Onslow	Western Australia	Moved from Old Onslow.
1924	Biloela	Queensland	
1924	Monto	Queensland	
1924	Murray Bridge	South Australia	
1925	Cowaramup	Western Australia	
1926	Katherine	Northern Territory	
1926	Carbunup River	Carbunup River	
1934	Tarraleah	Tasmania	
1936	Seventeen Seventy	Queensland	
1940	Loveday	South Australia	
1946	Wittenoom	Western Australia	Closed in 2007 due to asbestos contamination.
1947	Bronte Park	Tasmania	
1947	Woomera	South Australia	
1953	Bindoon	Western Australia	
1956	Jurien Bay	Western Australia	
1960s	Tom Price	Western Australia	
1961	Kununurra	Western Australia	
1961	Weipa	Queensland	
1963	Gracetown	Western Australia	
1965	Churchill	Victoria	
1965	Dampier	Western Australia	
1965	Goldsworthy	Western Australia	Former mining town. Abandoned in 1992.
1966	Newman	Western Australia	Originally named Mount Newman until 1981.
1967	Exmouth	Western Australia	
1968	Karratha	Western Australia	
1969	Moranbah	Queensland	
1970	Ravenswood	Western Australia	
1971	Nhulunbuy	Northern Territory	
1972	Shay Gap	Western Australia	Former mining town. Closed in 1994.
1973	Dysart	Queensland	
1980s	Joondalup	Western Australia	
1981	Palmerston	Northern Territory	
1982	Jabiru	Northern Territory	
1987	Roxby Downs	South Australia	

== See also ==
- History of Australia
- List of cities by time of continuous habitation
