= Wombarra =

- Suburb
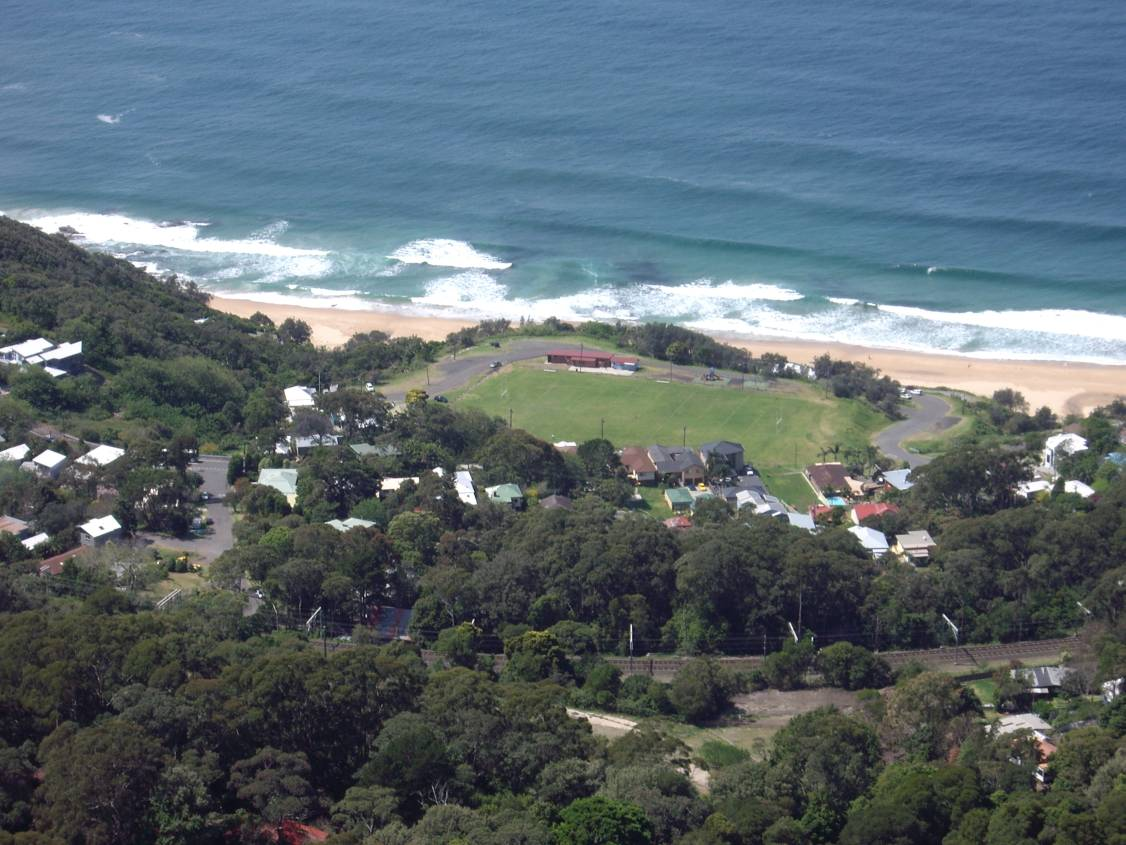
- View of Wombarra from the Illawarra Escarpment

- Coordinates: 34°16′30″S 150°57′12″E
- Country: Australia
- State: New South Wales
- City: Wollongong
- LGA: City of Wollongong
- Location: 66 km (41 mi) S of Sydney; 19 km (12 mi) N of Wollongong

Government
  - State electorate: Heathcote
  - Federal division: Cunningham
- Elevation: 33 m (108 ft)

Population
  - Total: 944 (2021 census)
- Postcode: 2515
Suburbs around Wombarra
Scarborough
Wombarra
Coledale

Wombarra (/wɒmbærə/) is a northern seaside suburb of Wollongong, on the south coast of New South Wales, Australia. Its main street is Lawrence Hargrave Drive. Wombarra is a Dharawal term meaning 'black duck'.

Wombarra has a cemetery, lawn bowling club, Catholic church and a railway station.

== Notable residents ==
- Kathy Jackson, former national secretary of the Health Services Union and Fair Work Commissioner Michael Lawler
- Anh Do, a Vietnamese-born Australian author, actor, comedian, and painter.
