= Disappearance of Cheryl Grimmer =

1970 Australian unsolved kidnapping case

Cheryl Grimmer
- Cheryl and her father, Vince
- Born: Cheryl Gene Grimmer; 1966; Knowle, Bristol, England, UK
- Disappeared: 12 January 1970 (aged 3); Fairy Meadow Beach, Wollongong, New South Wales, Australia
- Status: Declared dead in absentia 2011 (aged 45)
- Known for: Kidnapping victim
- Parents: Vince Grimmer (father); Carole Grimmer (mother)

Cheryl Gene Grimmer (30 October 1966 – disappeared 12 January 1970; declared legally dead 2011) was a three-year-old British toddler who was kidnapped from Fairy Meadow Beach in Wollongong, New South Wales, in January 1970. She had been in the shower block at the beach when witnesses claim a man took her and ran off.

Cheryl's disappearance had been without explanation for over forty-five years, until a suspect was arrested and charged in March 2017. The suspect, who had previously made a false confession about an unrelated murder, claimed that he, then aged 16, had strangled Cheryl to death in the nearby suburb of Balgownie about an hour after her abduction. At a court appearance, the man pleaded not guilty. His trial was expected to take place at the Supreme Court of New South Wales in May 2019, but a judge declared that a key piece of evidence was inadmissible, leading to the prosecution dropping the charges against the suspect in February 2019.

== Life ==
Cheryl Grimmer's family emigrated to Australia from Knowle, a suburb of Bristol, England, in the spring of 1968; Cheryl was two years old at the time of the relocation. The Grimmers were living in Fairy Meadow Migrant Hostel near the beach where she disappeared. The other members of the family were mother Carole (26), father Vince (24), and sons Ricki (7), Stephen (5), and Paul (4).

== Disappearance ==
On the morning of 12 January 1970, the Grimmer family went to the beach at Fairy Meadow in Illawarra, except for Vince, who was away working as a sapper for the Australian Army. When the weather turned at 1:30 pm, Carole decided it was time to go home. The children all went to the shower block together while Carole packed up their belongings. Ricki went back to Carole ten minutes later saying that Cheryl was refusing to come out of the shower block. She immediately followed Ricki back to the shower block to find that Cheryl had disappeared. There was no phone nearby, so Carole made her way to a house on nearby Elliotts Road and asked the residents to call the police.

At the time, witnesses claimed that a man was seen holding Cheryl up to drink from a water fountain and then ran off with her wrapped up in a towel. Those claims are now seen as unlikely. Cheryl's brother, Ricki, recalled picking up his sister so that she could drink from the fountain and so it is believed that witnesses had conflated the two occurrences. It was also claimed that Cheryl was spotted in a white car.

== Investigation ==
Cheryl's disappearance sparked a massive search. A day after investigations began, the New South Wales Police announced that they had four theories as to Cheryl's whereabouts: that she was hiding and had fallen asleep, that she had wandered into the ocean and was carried away by currents, that she had fallen into a waterway, or that she had been kidnapped. After a day of searching, all but the latter theory were dismissed and police began pursuing relevant leads, such as the sighting of a blue Volkswagen Type 2 van near the scene of the crime. On the third day, police received a note demanding $10,000 and stating that the child was unharmed. They staged a drop for the money in Bulli, but the purported kidnapper never showed up, despite police believing that the note was credible. Officers disguised themselves as council workers for the ransom drop and originally feared that had led to the kidnapper being spooked, and that the large police operation may have deterred the person from coming forward. However, the writer of the note never contacted police again and it was assumed the note was a hoax. The case became famous in Australia and, to escape the notoriety, the Grimmer family returned to England for ten years afterwards.

Although the police had three main suspects, none could be positively identified as the man witnesses had seen. In 1971, just under 18 months after Cheryl's disappearance, a local teenager, then 17, confessed to abducting and killing her. The man gave an overview of what occurred that day, describing a tubular steel gate, a cattle guard, a track, and a small creek near the scene of the murder. He took police to the corner of Brokers and Balgownie roads and claimed the body was buried there, but noted that the area had undergone residential development and so he couldn't be sure. Police interviewed the owner of the property, who contradicted the suspect's description and stated that there was no cattle guard in place at the time of the murder and that there had never been a tubular gate of any kind. The inconsistencies eventually led to police to conclude that the confession was false. A police report at the time, written by Detective Sergeant Phillip Findlay, stated:

On the whole it is considered without some material evidence to directly connect him with the missing child it would not be desirable to take any action against him in respect to this matter at this time.

In spite of numerous appeals, and a $5000 reward offered by the New South Wales government, there was no breakthrough in the inquiry and the case went cold.

== Later developments ==
In the 2000s, New South Wales Police Minister, Mike Gallacher, stated that it was entirely possible that both Cheryl and her kidnapper were dead but expressed the hope that someone might know the truth. He also theorised that Cheryl might be alive and free, and encouraged anybody who believed they might be her to come forward. One of Cheryl's characteristics that was cited as a possible identifier was a belly button which protruded one centimetre, due to a medical condition, which may or may not have been corrected by surgery. In 2008, a woman came forward, believing that she might be Cheryl, but a swab taken from her inside cheek proved not to match Cheryl's DNA.

In May 2011, a coroner formally ruled that Cheryl had died shortly after going missing, due to an undetermined cause, and recommended that police reopen the investigation. Carole Grimmer said that she believed her daughter was still alive. In response, police posted a $100,000 reward for information regarding Cheryl's disappearance, and Wollongong detectives and the Homicide Squad's Unsolved Homicide Team combined into a new task force called "Strike Force Wessell". Shortly after the investigation was reopened, both Carole and Vince Grimmer died without knowing what happened to Cheryl.

In 2016, a review of the evidence was carried out and all of it, including witness statements, was computerised for the first time. The review uncovered many leads and brought to light information that appeared not to have been pursued thoroughly enough in the original investigation, particularly the 1971 confession. Police returned to the property where the teenager alleged that he had committed the murder and questioned the owner's son, who, contradicting his father, said that the cattle guard was "certainly" in place at the time and that he recalled a tubular gate, as well as a track leading over a creek into the property.

In late 2016, police announced that three witnesses had come forward who recalled a male teenager loitering around the shower block, and said that they had a credible lead on a man who was seen carrying a fair-haired child at the time of Cheryl's disappearance. Police noted that the man would be in his 60s by then and appealed for him to come forward.

In January 2017, police turned their attention to the Mount Penang Training School for Boys, a reformatory school which it was believed the suspect attended in the early 1970s. They implied that they had been provided with information by somebody who alleged that former staff or residents of the school would be able to help with the inquiry.

== Arrest of suspect and court proceedings ==
On 23 March 2017, it was announced that a man had been arrested in the Melbourne suburb of Frankston at 1pm the previous day, and was being extradited from Victoria. He was charged at Wollongong Police Station with Cheryl's abduction and murder, and was incarcerated at the Silverwater Correctional Complex. Police said it was unlikely that Cheryl's body would ever be found because, in the 47 years since the abduction, there has been substantial development of the once-rural area.

In April 2017, New South Wales police announced that they were trying to trace a family who gave a witness statement on the day of the abduction. Soon after Cheryl's disappearance, the family moved to Papua New Guinea and then back to their native Nottinghamshire in England. Interpol assisted in tracing efforts, eventually finding them. Their testimonies were expected to be crucial in the court case.

In May 2017, it was revealed that the suspect who had been arrested in March was the same person who had confessed to Cheryl's abduction and murder in 1971, but whose confession had been dismissed due to inconsistencies. The accused was a 63-year-old man, who was born in Britain and has been in Australia since the late 1960s. He was not named, because he was around 15 years old at the time of the alleged offence and therefore a minor.

In his original 1971 statement, the man, who allegedly told doctors in 1970 that he had "urges to kill himself and kill other people", said that, after the abduction, he had hidden with the toddler in a nearby drain for about 35 minutes, gagging her with a handkerchief and tying her hands behind her back with a shoelace. After emerging from the drain, he took her three kilometres on foot to the suburb of Balgownie, where, according to prosecutor Emilija Beljic, he intended to have sexual intercourse with her. The accused denied the latter claim, calling it "bullshit". In his original confession, he had told police that after he took the gag off Cheryl she started to scream, so he put his hands around her neck and told her to "shut up", eventually strangling her to death. He apparently panicked, took off her clothing, and placed "bushes and dirt" over the body before heading back to Fairy Meadow Beach.

The confession also included information which, the prosecution claimed, the man could not have known without being present at the beach when the abduction occurred. That included a description of the royal blue bathing suit Cheryl was wearing, and of the white towel she was carrying, as well as mention of the fact that somebody had picked up Cheryl so that she could drink from a water fountain, which her brother Ricki had confirmed he did.

The defence argued that the accused was significantly mentally unwell at the time of the confession so it was inadmissible in court. They claimed that he had also made a confession to the murder of a prison guard, which had been determined to be false.

The defendant appeared via video link at the Supreme Court of New South Wales on 7 September 2018, and spoke only to confirm his name and enter a not guilty plea. His trial was due to occur in the same court in May 2019, but a judge declared a key piece of evidence inadmissible, being that the confession was not obtained in the presence of a parent or guardian (which at the time was not a requirement but the judge ruled that it be applied retroactively), leading to the prosecution dropping the charge against the suspect in February 2019.

== Developments following the court case ==
An inquiry into unsolved murders and long-term missing persons cases was established on 15 October 2025 by the Parliament of New South Wales. The inquiry would be looking at cases from 1965-2010 within New South Wales. Cheryl Grimmer's case was named alongside others in the terms of reference for the inquiry, with members being asked to consider if the criminal justice system had impacted the delivery of justice to families.

On 23 October 2025, the previously-charged suspect - known by the pseudonym "Mercury" - was named in the New South Wales Legislative Council under parliamentary privilege. It followed an ultimatum the previous week from Grimmer's family to "Mercury" to either admit guilt for Cheryl's murder, or explain how he knew details of the crime that had not been made public at the time of his 1971 confession. Council member Jeremy Buckingham named "Mercury", read out the confession, and called for a new investigation into the case.

In February 2026, Sally Dowling, the serving Director of Public Prosecutions, announced her office would be conducting a special review into the case. This was despite the case being past the normal time limit that families are allotted to request a review.

== Media ==
In January 2022, the BBC released an eight-part documentary podcast series called Fairy Meadow covering the details of the case.

== See also ==
- List of people who disappeared
