= Fairy Meadow =

Fairy Meadow may refer to:

- Fairy Meadow, New South Wales, a suburb of Wollongong
  - Fairy Meadow railway station, a railway station there
- Fairy Meadows, a scenic location in Gilgit-Baltistan, Pakistan
- Bill Putnam hut, an alpine hut in Canada also known as the Fairy Meadow hut
