= North Wollongong railway station =

Railway station in Australia

North Wollongong
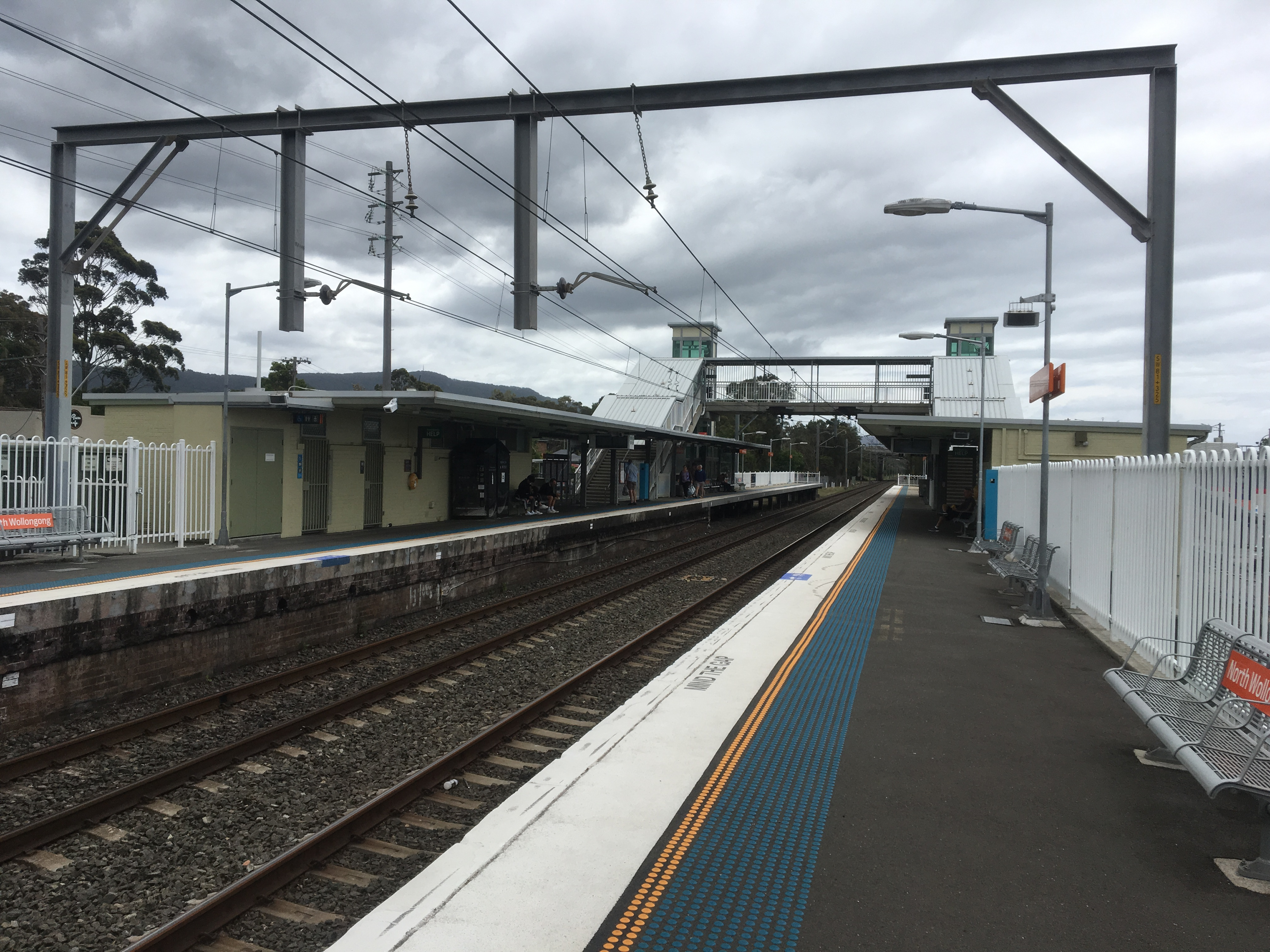
- Northbound view from Platform 2, October 2018

General information
- Location: Porter Street, North Wollongong; Australia
- Coordinates: 34°24′44″S 150°53′28″E
- Elevation: 6 metres (20 ft)
- Owner: Transport Asset Manager of New South Wales
- Operator: Sydney Trains
- Line: South Coast
- Distance: 81.32 kilometres (50.53 mi) from Central
- Platforms: 2 side
- Tracks: 2
- Connections: Bus

Construction
- Structure type: Ground
- Parking: Yes
- Cycle facilities: Yes
- Accessible: Yes

Other information
- Status: Weekdays: Staffed: 5.35am to 9.35pm: Weekends and public holidays: Staffed: 7am to 3pm Saturday
- Station code: NHW
- Website: Transport for NSW

History
- Opened: 19 July 1915

Passengers
- 2023: 718,130 (year); 1967 (daily) (Sydney Trains, NSW TrainLink)

Services
Preceding station	Intercity Trains	Following station
Wollongong towards Kiama or Port Kembla	South Coast Line	Fairy Meadow towards Central or Bondi Junction
Wollongong towards Kiama	South Coast Line Express	Thirroul towards Central or Bondi Junction
Location

North Wollongong railway station is located on the South Coast railway line in New South Wales, Australia. It serves the Northern Wollongong suburb of North Wollongong, opening on 19 July 1915. It is the primary station for the University of Wollongong.

== Platforms and services ==
North Wollongong has two side platforms serviced by Sydney Trains South Coast line services travelling between Sydney Central, Bondi Junction and Kiama, as well as local services from Waterfall and Thirroul to Port Kembla.

Platform	Line	Stopping pattern	Notes
1	SCO	services to Thirroul, Waterfall, Sydney Central & Bondi Junction	
2	SCO	services to Port Kembla & Kiama	

== Transport links ==
Busabout operates one bus route via North Wollongong station, under contract to Transport for NSW:

- 887: Campbelltown station to Wollongong station via Appin & Bulli Pass

Dion's Bus Service operates three bus routes via North Wollongong station, under contract to Transport for NSW:

- 9: Shuttle to University of Wollongong Ring Road
- 90: Austinmer station to Wollongong
- 92: Bulli station to Wollongong via East Woonona

Premier Charters operates one bus route via North Wollongong station, under contract to Transport for NSW:

- 2: Stanwell Park to Wollongong

Premier Illawarra operates seven bus routes via North Wollongong station, under contract to Transport for NSW:

- 3: Wollongong to Balgownie via Towradgi, Bellambi Point & Corrimal anti-clockwise loop
- 6: Wollongong to University of Wollongong via Mount Pleasant
- 7: Wollongong to Cabbage Tree Lane via Bellambi, Corrimal & Balgownie
- 8: Wollongong to Towradgi via Balgownie, Corrimal & Bellambi clockwise loop
- 10: Wollongong to Keiraville via Gwynneville
- 55A: Wollongong Shuttle anti-clockwise loop (weekends only)
- 55C: Wollongong Shuttle clockwise loop (weekends only)
