= NHW =

NHW may refer to:

- Department of National Health and Welfare, a Canadian federal department from 1944 to 1993
- Non-Hispanic whites in the United States
- Huasteca Nahuatl, a language spoken in Mexico, by ISO 639-3 code
- North Wollongong railway station, a train station in Wollongong, New South Wales, Australia
- Northeast Health Wangaratta, integrated hospital and health services in Wangaratta, Victoria, Australia
