= Wollongong Botanic Garden =

Boranic garden in New South Wales, Australia

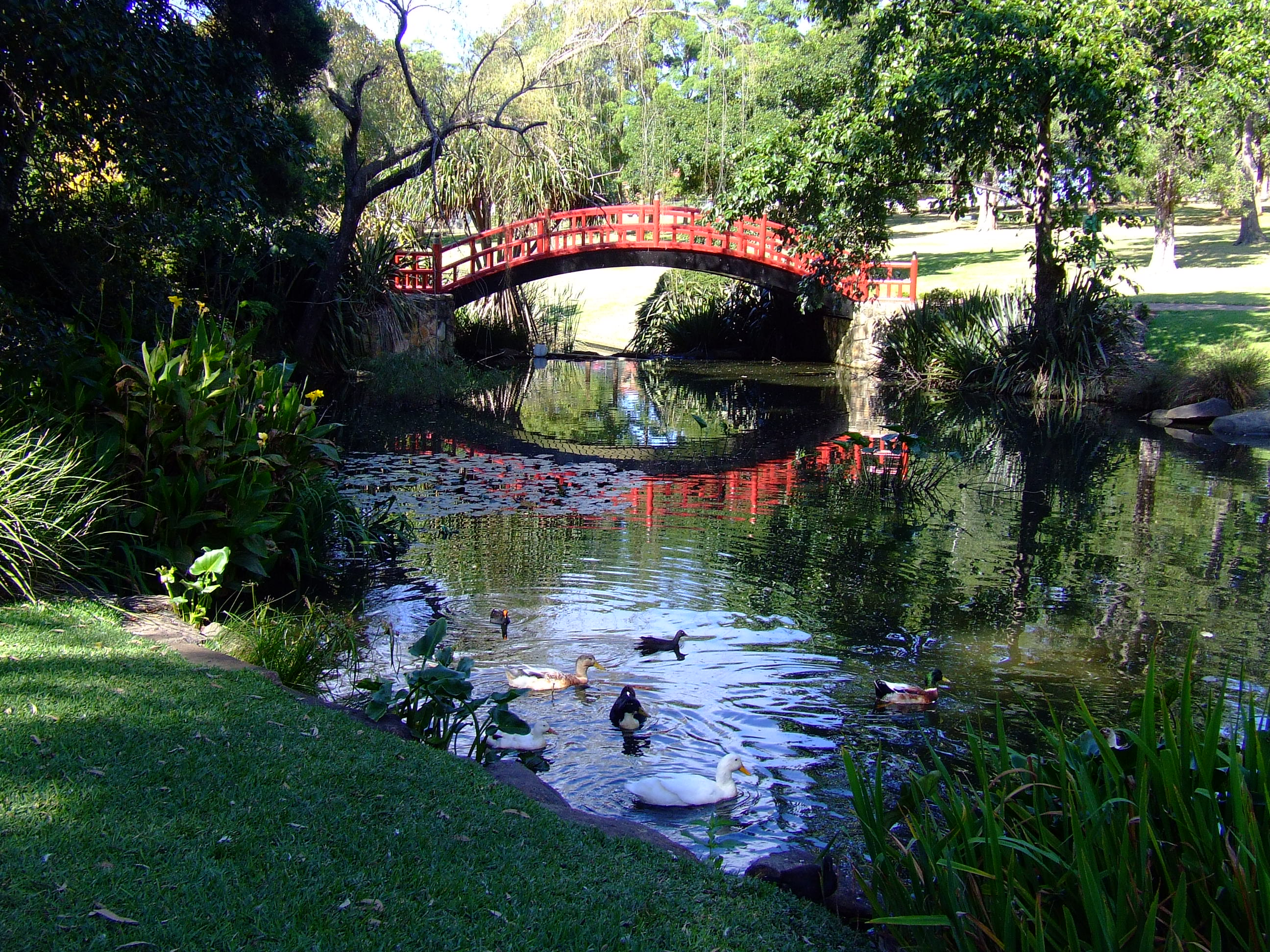
- Water fowl at the garden's Autumn Lake

- Location within New South Wales Location within Australia
- Type: Botanical garden
- Location: Wollongong, New South Wales, Australia
- Coordinates: 34°24′36″S 150°52′39″E
- Opened: 1964
- Website: Official website

The Wollongong Botanic Garden is located in the Wollongong suburb of Keiraville at the foot of Mount Keira in New South Wales, Australia. It is the local botanical gardens of the Illawarra and was established in 1964. It was opened in September 1970.

The garden is co-located with the historic Gleniffer Brae house, used for functions and the Wollongong Conservatorium of Music.

A number of annexes are managed by the garden - Puckeys Estate Reserve in Fairy Meadow, the Korrongulla Wetlands in Primbee and the Mount Keira Summit Park.

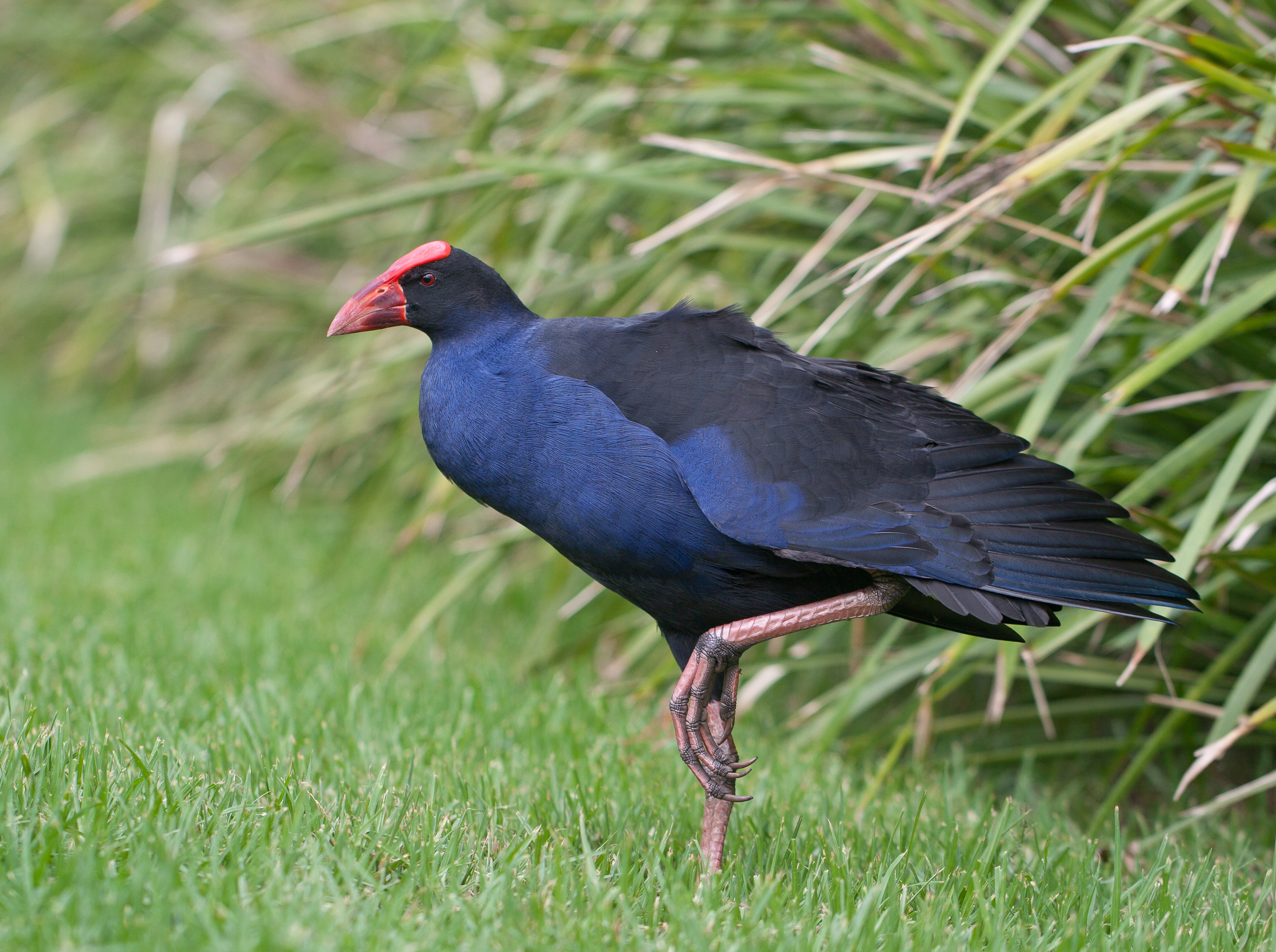
A purple swamphen in Wollongong Botanic Garden

== Garden features ==
Botanic Garden logo

The garden features various themed areas, including a rose garden, woodland garden, azalea bank, succulent plants and several rainforest areas, divided into Illawarra rainforest, subtropical rainforest, dry rainforest and exotic rainforest. A creek runs through the garden and into a small lake. This creek joins Para Creek and runs into Puckeys Estate Reserve.

In 1993, a Japanese-style wooden bridge was gifted to the City of Wollongong by Wollongong's sister city in Japan, Kawasaki, to mark the 5th anniversary of the sister city relationship. It sits over the creek in the Wollongong Botanic Garden, near the Rose Garden. The bridge has been restored twice, in 2005 and 2026.

The Mercury Fountain, also known as the Mercury Five Islands Fountain, is a dry fountain that sits at the northern entrance of the gardens. Initially installed in Rest Park in 1980 to commemorate the Illawarra Mercury's 125th anniversary, it was moved to the Wollongong Botanic Garden in 1984. The design of the fountain is inspired by the nearby Five Islands. The fountain has not been in operation since 2009.

The lake, commonly referred to as the duck pond, is a local attraction and features a boardwalk to a rotunda in the centre. It is inhabited by ducks, geese, eels, and turtles.

== Sculpture in the Garden Wollongong ==
The Wollongong Botanic Garden has hosted the free Sculpture in the Garden Wollongong exhibition every two years since 2016. Each exhibition, the winning sculpture is acquired by the Wollongong City Council to become part of the city's permanent art collection, becoming a permanent installation in the Wollongong Botanic Garden.

Previous winners include:

- King Coal, by Louis Pratt (2016)
- Steel City, by Michael Purdy (2018)
- Curious Dream of an Architect, by Fatih Semiz (2021)
- Banksia, by Deborah Redwood (2023)
- Affinity, by Jenny Reddin (2025)

== See also ==
- Auburn Botanical Gardens
- Puckeys Estate Reserve
- List of botanical gardens
