= Dion's Bus Service =

Australian bus company in Wollongong

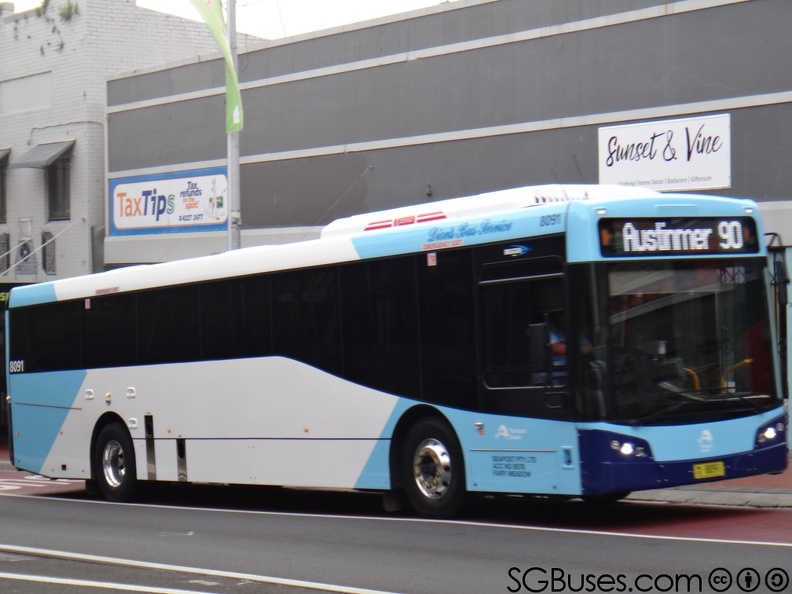
- Dion's Bus Service Bustech bodied Volvo B8RLE in November 2020
- Parent: Dion family
- Commenced operation: 1923
- Headquarters: Fairy Meadow
- Service area: Wollongong
- Service type: Bus operator
- Routes: 3
- Depots: 1
- Fleet: 22 (April 2019)
- Website: www.dions.com.au

Dion's Bus Service is an Australian bus company operating services in Wollongong.

== History ==
Dion's Bus Service was founded in 1923 when Thomas Dion commenced operating a service from Wollongong to Balgownie followed by a service to Bellambi. It is currently the oldest operating bus operator in the Illawarra.

From December 1927 until 1931 a coach service was operated to Sydney. In January 1928 it commenced operating route 1 services from Wollongong to Austinmer, along with five other operators. In August 1929, Barney Dion commenced operating a service from Wollongong to Kiama.

In the late 1940s, the Balgownie and Bellambi routes were sold. By 1964, through a number of acquisitions, the Austinmer service was operated jointly by Dion's and Jim Hill. In December 1976, Dion's became the sole operator of the service and in the same year, selling the Kiama service to John J Hill at the same time. On 24 February 1992, route 4 Wollongong to Bulli was purchased from John J Hill.

== Services ==
Dion's operates services in the Outer Sydney Metropolitan Bus Service Region 12, which was part of Region 9 when the latter was created in 2008.

They operate 4 routes in the northern and central suburbs of Wollongong: On 1 April 2019 their routes were renumbered as follows:

- 90: Wollongong, Fairy Meadow, Corrimal, Woonona, Bulli, Thirroul and Austinmer.
- 91: Austinmer to University via Princes Highway.
- 92: Wollongong, Fairy Meadow, Corrimal, Woonona, East Woonona and Bulli.
- 93: Bulli to University via Princes Highway, East Woonona and Corrimal. (Since ceased).
- 94N: Friday and Saturday nights only late night service between Wollongong and Thirroul via Princes Highway. (Since ceased).

In addition they operate two free shuttle services from North Wollongong Station to Wollongong University via Kids Uni, URAC, Creative Arts Building and Hope Theatre:-

- 9: UOW North Gong Shuttle
- 9N: UOW North Gong Shuttle

(Since 2024 these shuttles are operated by Premier Illawarra.)

A number of community and government stakeholders funded Dion's "Wollongong Summer Bus", a late night bus service run in central Wollongong during the summer months. The Summer Bus was a drink-drive and drink-walk prevention strategy supported by licensed venues as well as local government, health, police and transport authorities. It was superseded by route 94N which operated for extended hours on Friday and Saturday nights. Route 94N was discontinued from 8 Sept 2019.

Route 93 was discontinued from 3 August 2026 in favour of additional services on routes 90 and 92.

== Fleet ==
As at April 2019, the fleet comprised 22 buses. The fleet livery was blue and white until 1989 when a metallic grey, blue and black livery was introduced. In 2010, the Transport for NSW white and blue livery was adopted.

In the 1950s and 1960s, Dion's built their own bodies on second-hand Leyland Comet truck chassis. In 1989, Dion's purchased two Hinos, these were the first new buses in over 40 years.
