= Mount Pleasant, New South Wales =

Mount Pleasant
- Suburb
- Coordinates: 34°23′44″S 150°52′01″E
- Country: Australia
- State: New South Wales
- City: Wollongong
- LGA: Wollongong
- Location: 84 km (52 mi) from Sydney; 6 km (3.7 mi) from Wollongong

Government
  - State electorate: Keira
  - Federal division: Cunningham

Area
  - Total: 1.0 km^{2} (0.39 sq mi)
- Elevation: 194 m (636 ft)

Population
  - Total: 1,397 (2021 census)
  - Density: 1,400/km^{2} (3,620/sq mi)
- Postcode: 2519
Suburbs around Mount Pleasant
	Balgownie	Fairy Meadow
	Mount Pleasant	Mount Ousley
Mount Keira		Keiraville

Mount Pleasant is a hilly suburb in the city of Wollongong, New South Wales, Australia. It is situated on the northern flank of Mount Keira extending across to the Illawarra escarpment and is exclusively residential. It is home to the Rhododendron Park, found on Parrish Avenue. Mount Pleasant has a small local primary school Pleasant Heights Public School which has approximately 180 enrolled students. The suburb is locally notable for its commonly known Brokers Road which is amongst the steepest roads in New South Wales.

== History ==
John Dingwall owned land in the Mount Pleasant area. He named it after another estate which belonged to him. The village of Mount Pleasant, located on the mountainside, developed after the opening of the Mount Pleasant mine in 1861. Mount Pleasant is a stable, quiet suburb which is economically non existent, and few residential developments occur.

== Sport ==
During the 2022 UCI Road World Championships cycling in Wollongong, Mount Pleasant was the main climb on the local tour of 17 km, that was ridden several times during the race.
