= Wollongong Conservatorium of Music =

Music conservatorium in Wollongong, New South Wales, Australia

Coordinates: 34.410181°S 150.872386°E

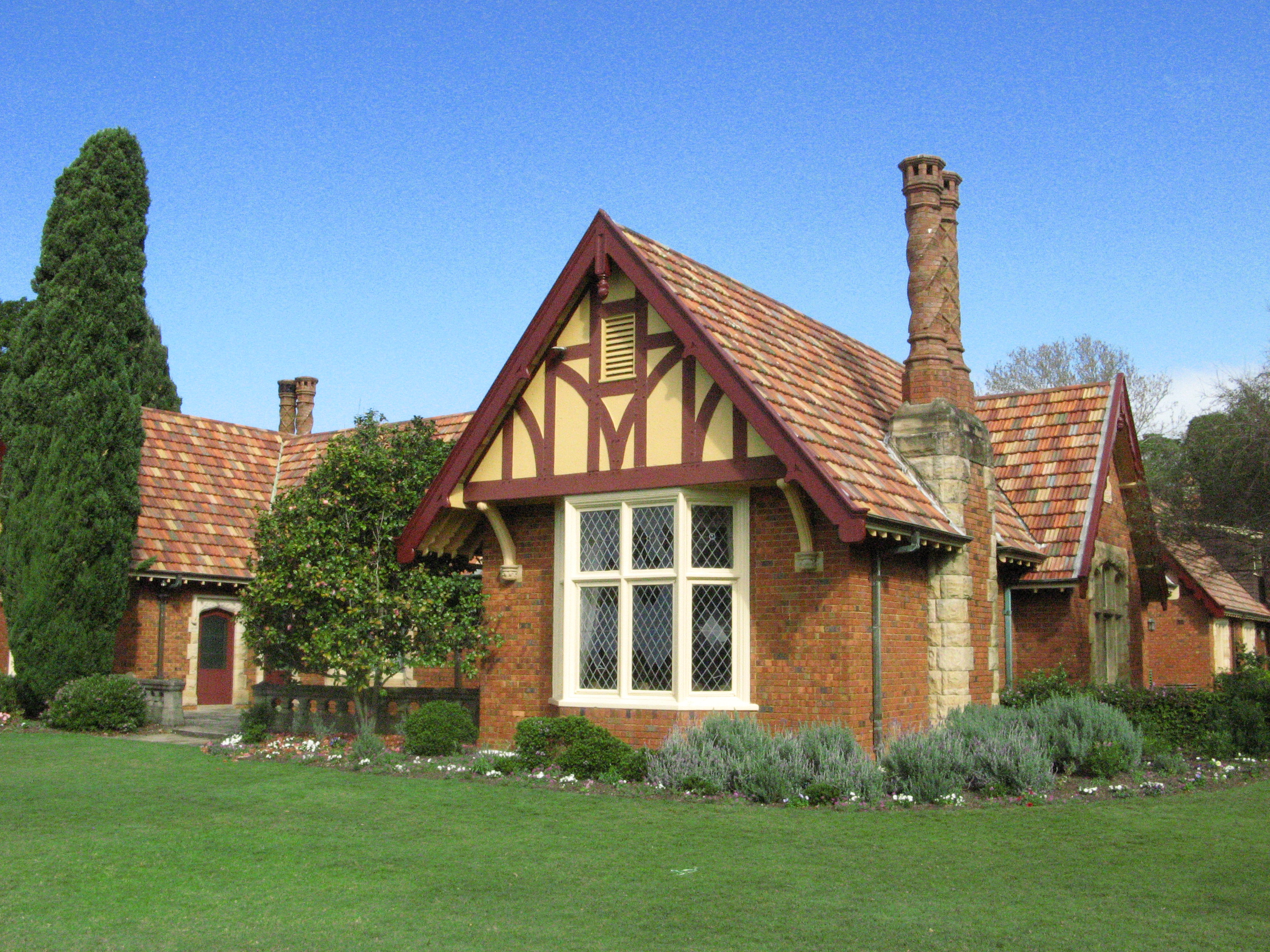
Gleniffer Brae Manor House, home to the Wollongong Conservatorium of Music

Wollongong Conservatorium of Music is a centre for music education, community music-making and performance, serving the city of Wollongong, New South Wales, Australia.

It is currently on the Register of Cultural Organisations (ROCO), as listed by the Australian Government.

It is located in the heritage listed English Tudor style Gleniffer Brae Manor House and grounds, part of the Wollongong Botanic Gardens in the suburb of Keiraville. Built in 1938, it was originally the family home of Arthur Sidney Hoskins, who established the steel making industry in Wollongong. The garden around the house was designed by renowned 20th Century landscaper Paul Sorensen.

== History ==
The Conservatorium was first established on 11 September 1972 as a Wollongong branch of the then New South Wales State Conservatorium of Music, with James Powell as first Hon. Principal. The Conservatorium moved its operations to Gleniffer Brae in a ceremony marked on 2 June 1980 by then Premier of NSW Neville Wran. Later, the Conservatorium split from its parent organisation, and instead became affiliated with the University of Wollongong, becoming known as the University Conservatorium of Music. In 1996, the Conservatorium split from the University and became incorporated as the Wollongong Conservatorium of Music.

In 2022, the Conservatorium will mark 50 years in Wollongong.

=== Past Directors ===
1972-1993 : James Powell (first honorary principal)

1993-1998 : Penelope Chapple (Senior Music Administrator)

1998-2001 : Claudio Pompili (Director)

2001-2008 : Graham Drayton (Director)

2008-2013 : Andrew Snell (CEO)

2014-2020 : Joe Gaudiosi (CEO)

Oct 2020 - April 2021: Justin Ankus (CEO)

2021-2024 : David Francis (CEO)

2024-present : Annette Brown (CEO)

== Description ==
The Wollongong Conservatorium of Music provides a wide range of programs, instrumental and vocal music tuition in contemporary, classical and jazz styles. It caters for individuals and groups ranging from pre-school to mature-age. Music theory tuition is also provided.

Wollongong Conservatorium of Music is one of the largest regional Conservatoriums in NSW and belongs to a network of 18 Regional Conservatoriums part-funded by the NSW government.

Individual lessons and classes are complemented by student participation in various instrumental and vocal ensembles, catering to different styles and levels of proficiency, including the BlueScope Steel Youth Orchestra conducted by Nigel Edwards, which has toured internationally.

The conservatorium runs over 50 events each year, most featuring students and/or professional artists. Student concerts include Performance Saturday, Instrumental Saturdays, Showcase Concerts, Open Day, Christmas at the Manor and the Mega Band. The Conservatorium's professional concerts focus on jazz and chamber music.

The Conservatorium is also active in community music. It hosted a Community Music Conference in partnership with the Music In Communities Network (a program of the Music Council of Australia) and maintains an active role in supporting local community music. Student and community ensembles perform regularly in concert venues around Wollongong including The Wollongong City Art Gallery, The Wollongong Town Hall, and at local arts festivals including; The Illawarra Folk Festival, HONK! Oz Street Music Festival and Viva La Gong.

=== Programs ===
- CHIME Early Childhood Music
- Instrumental/Vocal : Individual & Group Tuition

==== Student Ensembles ====
- Llewellyn String Orchestra
- Powell String Orchestra
- Bluescope Youth Orchestra
- Friday Camerata
- Beginner Band
- Junior Band
- Concert Band
- Wind Ensemble
- Jazz Band
- Introduction to Jazz Improvisation
- Latin Jazz Ensemble
- Conservatorium Jazz Orchestra
- Jazz Combos
- The Hummingbirds (Jazz Vocal Combo)
- Youth Theatre Chorus
- Conservatorium Guitar Ensemble

==== Community Ensembles ====
- The Con Artists
- Curious Rendition Orchestra
- The WollCon Symphony Orchestra (Wollcon Community Orchestra)
- Five Islands String Orchestra
- The Minor Swing Band
- The Conchords Community Choir

==== Theory ====
- Junior Theory
- High School Theory
- HSC Support
- Jazz Theory
- Theory For Adults

==== Con Schools Program ====
The Con collaborates with local public schools to run school bands and other music programs. In 2019 The Conservatorium collaborated with staff from the NSW Department of Education to present the 50th annual 'Combined Schools Instrument Festival' in the Wollongong Town Hall.

== Bluescope Steel Youth Orchestra ==
BlueScope has supported the BlueScope Youth Orchestra since 1986, making it one of the longest running cultural sponsorship in Australia and enabling the Wollongong Conservatorium of Music to offer a unique youth orchestra program in regional Australia with specialist tutors, scholarships to assist the development of young musicians and new works written for the orchestra.

Bluescope Steel received the Orchestras Australia 2006 Enlightened Support Award in recognition of its 20-year sponsorship of the BlueScope Steel Youth Orchestra.

== Jazz Program ==
Jazz Violinist Don Harper ran the first Jazz Program in the 80's at the Wollongong Con. The Conservatorium Show Band held regular concerts around Wollongong including in the Town Hall with guests Bob Barnard and Don Burrows

The current jazz program established in 2001 by Eric Dunan includes individual lessons in jazz, small jazz groups, and big bands. Students range in age from 11 years to adult. The advanced level Wollongong Conservatorium Jazz Orchestra toured China and Japan in 2005. James Morrison toured Japan with the band on the Japan portion of the trip and the band played with Morrison at the World Expo in Aichi Japan on 21 April. (This links to a Expo 2005 in wiki). The Jazz Orchestra has also toured to America in 2009, 2012, and 2017.

Notable alumni from the Con Jazz Orchestra include; Jodie Michael - Jann Rutherford Award winner, Nick Garbett - Freedman Fellowship Winner / National Jazz Award Finalist, Novak Manoljovic - Freedman Fellowship winner, Matt Smith - National Jazz Award Finalist / guitarist with Thirsty Merc

The Wollongong Conservatorium of Music auditorium has become a notable jazz venue, with the annual jazz concert series hosting significant local, interstate and international artists including:

Mark Levine / Eugene Wright / Joe Farnsworth / The Bad Plus / Mike Nock / Bob Montgomery / Rodney Whitaker / Lakecia Benjamin / Yoshio Suzuki / Vincent Gardner / Florian Ross / Sandy Evans / Shannon Barnett / Ingrid Jensen / Jane Bunnet / Paul Grabowski / Lionel Loueke / Phil Slater
