= North Wollongong =

- Suburb
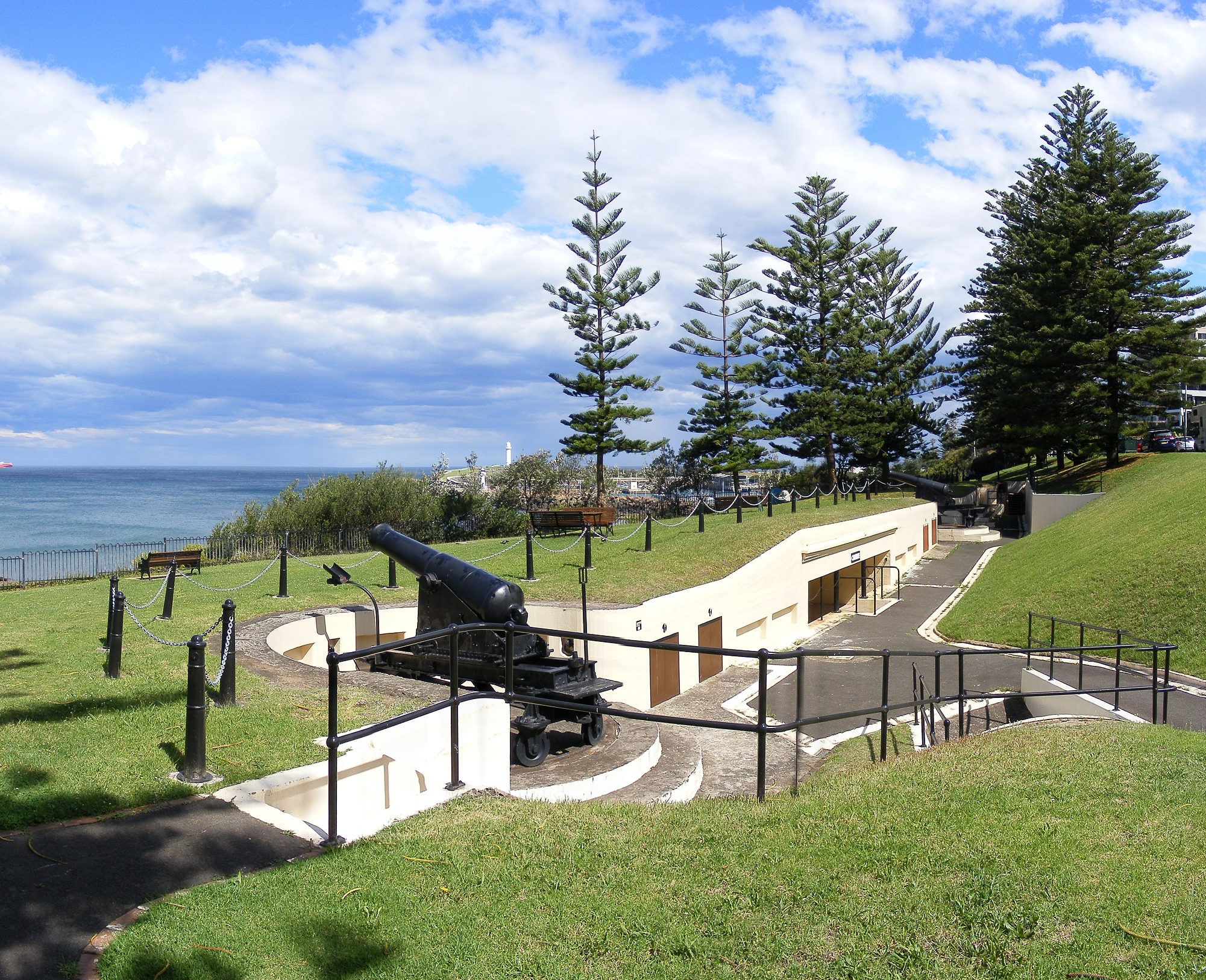
- Smiths Hill Fort

- Coordinates: 34°25′S 150°53′E
- Country: Australia
- State: New South Wales
- City: Wollongong
- LGA: City of Wollongong
- Location: 84 km (52 mi) S of Sydney; 2 km (1.2 mi) N of Wollongong

Government
  - State electorate: Wollongong, Keira
  - Federal division: Cunningham
- Elevation: 7 m (23 ft)

Population
  - Total: 2,299 (2021 census)
- Postcode: 2500
Suburbs around North Wollongong
Mount Ousley	Fairy Meadow	Pacific Ocean
Keiraville	North Wollongong	Pacific Ocean
Gwynneville	Wollongong	Pacific Ocean

North Wollongong is a coastal suburb of the City of Wollongong, New South Wales, Australia. It is immediately to the north of the Wollongong city centre. Although North Wollongong is an official suburb with precise boundaries, the term North Wollongong may refer to northern areas of Wollongong which are not part of the suburb.

== Geography ==
The suburb has a beach, North Wollongong Beach, or simply North Beach, with adjacent cafes and restaurants as well as the Novotel Northbeach Hotel.

Most of North Wollongong is commercial or residential with many of Wollongong's highrises situated there. The main commerce is along a strip on the Princes Highway near North Wollongong Station and the overpass as well as another strip on the north (western) side of the overpass including food stores. North Wollongong is the terminal of Mount Ousley Road, the main route to Sydney.

== History ==
In 1893 Smiths Hill Fort was built to fend off possible Russian attack; two of the three original cannons remain.

The suburb achieved tourist popularity in the 1920s, and many Norfolk Island pines planted during that era still remain. A bather's pavilion was opened in 1936.

== Amenities ==
North Beach is a popular surfing and swimming destination with a year-round surf patrol. The North Wollongong beachfront is also the beginning of the Heartcare Foundation section of the Wollongong to Thirroul Bike Track, which runs adjacent to the coast to Thirroul to the north. West of North Beach is a small strip of park along the cliff that runs between Cliff Road and the bike track; this is the location of Smiths Hill Fort.

North Wollongong has a beachside recreation ground, Stuart Park, which also houses the headquarters of Skydive the Beach. North of the park is Puckeys Estate Reserve.

== Heritage listings ==
North Wollongong has a number of heritage-listed sites, including:

- Cliff Road: North Beach Precinct
