= Puckeys Estate Reserve =

Nature reserve in New South Wales, Australia

Coordinates: 34°24′20″S 150°54′04″E

Puckey's Estate Reserve is a coastal nature reserve in North Wollongong, New South Wales, Australia. It is mainly she-oak forest, but also has sand dune and wetland areas, including areas along Para Creek. It is located in the suburb of Fairy Meadow and is bounded by Fairy Meadow Beach to the east, Squires Way to the west, Elliotts Road to the north and Fairy Lagoon to the south.

Puckey's Estate was traditionally used by the Wadi Wadi people, the Aboriginal tribe in Wollongong. It was once owned by a Mr Courtenay Puckey for use as an experimental saltworks and still contains the historic site of Puckey's graduation tower and house, a jetty site he built and plaques on Aboriginal and European historic uses for the area.

The area is used by many locals and visitors as a recreation area. It is also used for educational purposes; schools and community groups work there, and on some days including Australia Day, runs are held through the reserve, along the main track. The south end of the main track, running through the reserve, comes to a wooden boardwalk, from which Fairy Lagoon, Mount Keira, Stuart Park and parts of North Wollongong can be viewed. Cyclists generally take the paved Squires Way route.

The reserve is also locally famous for its bird-watching opportunities, having over 120 species recorded. It is important to local flora and fauna, but is also the scourge (dealt with by local volunteer groups) of bitou bush, lantana and other imported weeds such as prickly pear.

Puckey's is managed as a separate section (annexe) of the Wollongong Botanic Garden.

== History ==
Courtenay Puckey, bought the area of land known today as Puckey's Estate by 1905 and set about constructing his saltworks. Puckey's graduation tower stood at 9.15 metres (30.0 feet) high and used a centuries-old process to extract salt. A wind powered pump at the lagoon entrance pumped salt water to the top where it would trickle down through the wooden structure filled with tightly packed tea tree brush-wood branches until it reached several evaporation basins for heating and final salt extraction. Remnants of these basins, Puckey's house, wall and jetty, and the cement base of the tower, are still visible. Puckey had previously experimented with similar saltworks at North Wollongong Beach during the mid-1890s.

== Walking Tracks ==
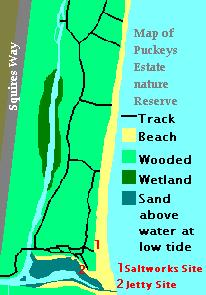
Map of Puckeys Estate

The Main Track starts (from south to north) at the boardwalk beginning at the northern end of the bridge over Fairy Creek, part of Squire's Way and following a route hugging the northwest side of the lagoon for a hundred metres or so. At this section there are several wooden seats and fishing is a not uncommon practice from the boardwalk. From the boardwalk one can see the southern part of the reserve, the lagoon entrance and North Wollongong. From here it crosses the creek at a wooden bridge and turns into a track on the other side. In high tide and flood conditions this small portion may flood. From here it goes left (north), following the east side of the creek through she-oak woodland and other common coastal plants before going towards the coast through coastal banksia and acacia growth. Then it returns to the creek until it reaches the split to two paths heading to Fairy Meadow Beach picnic area. The left hand one goes along the creek and to a bridge that reaches a small island with a picnic area in the creek, the second up a five or so metre high hill and along through coastal bush. Benches for bird watching and enjoying nature may be found along the path at several intervals. The right hand track to the picnic ground has excellent 360 degree views of the plain, sea and the escarpment.

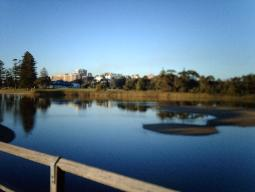
View from bridge across creek

From the entrance sign another track forms. This one goes to the beach to the east, and several minor tracks branch from it to history plaques, picnic areas and seats, including a seat under a prominent pine at the lagoon edge from where views of Wollongong can be had, and the sites of Puckey's constructions and the remnants of his house and saltworks. This area has two prominent pines which can be seen from North Wollongong.

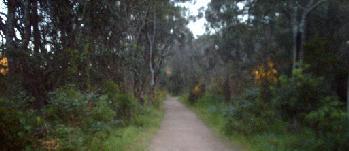
Main track

From the saltworks a track, overgrown mildly with bitou bush, though easy to follow, goes just west of the dunes and then joins the main track about halfway up the reserve. Several short tracks join the main track to the beach and are marked by posts. Much of the dunes have been protected with signs declaring a restabilisation project.

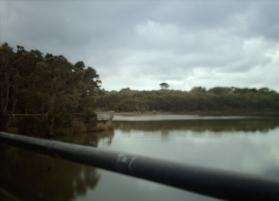
Lagoon and boardwalk seen from Squires Way bridge

== Flora ==
The reserve contains several examples of ecosystem. On the eastern side adjacent to Fairy Meadow Beach there is a dune environment dominated by the invasive bitou bush and the native Banksia as well as succulents such as Pigface and other native plants. In the extreme southern end are two pine trees. Also in the southern end is a third prominent tree jutting from the normal height of the bush, clearly visible from the other side of the lagoon at Stuart Park. Along the creek and immediately about it a wetland environment is present, attracting spoonbills and herons as well as the odd ibis. This area is dominated by Casuarina (She-Oak) and reed grasses, deadly nightshade and other grasses, as well as ground dwelling plants such as warrigal greens. In the western section and the middle eastern section the bushland is formed by a combination of native and invasive plants. Native plants include casuarina, Banksia and native bean plants. Also prevalent is a large amount of acacias, known as wattles. There are some smooth barked eucalypts as well, though these are a minority

== Fauna ==
Birds are common here and over 136 species have been recorded, including pelican, ibis, spoonbill, heron, raven and others. Lizards abound and include skinks and bluetongues. Rabbits, a foreign pest, also abound in large numbers. Possums are also present. many species of insect and spider reside there

== Weeds and Problems ==
Bushcare groups are tackling weed infestations. Weeds that have become a problem are bitou bush, Lantana, and prickly pear. There is also a substantial infestation of groundsel bush. Other less problematic weeds include Deadly Nightshade. Signs declaring the importance of plants in the reserve and the active work by Bushcare groups in tackling weeds and litter have been put up along the boardwalk at the southern entrance in 2007.

Littering has becomes a major problem here. At high tide or in flood conditions litter collects at the shore revealing the problem. Currently a plan is being made by council to stop this by using litter stoppers.
