= Gleniffer Brae =

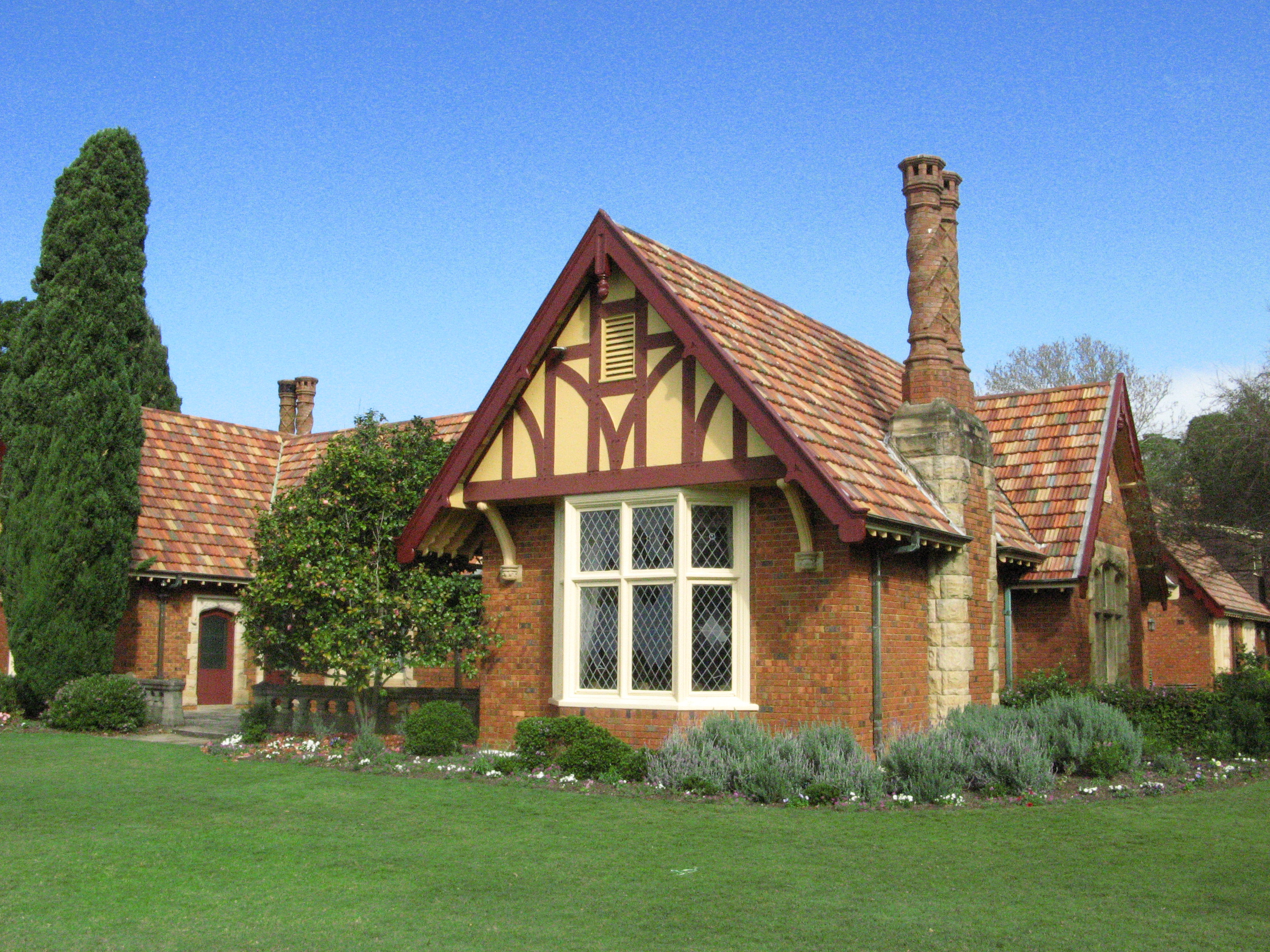

- Location within New South Wales Location within Australia
- 34.4094°S 150.8729°E
- Location: Murphys Avenue, Keiraville, City of Wollongong, New South Wales, Australia

History
- Built: 1937–1939

Site notes
- Architect(s): Geoffrey D. Loveridge (of G.D.Loveridge & Associates)
- Architectural style: Inter-war Old English
- Owner: Wollongong City Council

New South Wales Heritage Register
- Official name: Gleniffer Brae; Glenifer Brae; Wollongong Conservatorium of Music
- Type: state heritage (complex / group)
- Designated: 2 April 1999
- Reference no.: 557
- Type: Historic Landscape
- Category: Landscape - Cultural
- Builders: Mr L Benbow; Joinery: W.W.Todd & Son; Bricks/tiles: W.Wilson & Co.; Stone: Hawkesbury Sandstone Co.

Gleniffer Brae is a heritage-listed former residence, school and now conservatorium of music and function centre on Murphys Avenue in the Wollongong suburb of Keiraville, New South Wales, Australia. It was designed by Geoffrey D. Loveridge and built from 1937 to 1939 by L. Benbow in conjunction with W. W. Todd & Son (joinery), W. Wilson & Co. (bricks/tiles) and Hawkesbury Sandstone Co. (stone). It is also known as Glenifer Brae and Wollongong Conservatorium of Music. The property is owned by Wollongong City Council. It was added to the New South Wales State Heritage Register on 2 April 1999.

== History ==
=== Early history ===
The land that would become Gleniffer Brae and the Wollongong Botanic Garden was originally inhabited by the Dharawal Aboriginal people. 2000 acres of land including this site were purchased by James Spearing in 1825. In the 1830s the estate was sold and subdivided.

The site of Gleniffer Brae was originally part of a Crown grant of 1000 acres to Robert and Charles Campbell in 1841. The land went through a number of different owners until 1928. James Fitzgerald bought 75 acres in 1919, building Cratloe, the cottage on the Wollongong Botanic Gardens site now used as the Gardens' Discovery Centre.

In 1928, Arthur Sidney (known as Sidney) Hoskins a founder of the Australian Iron and Steel works at Port Kembla, came from Lithgow with his brother Cecil. Sidney Hoskins purchased 75 acres of Fitzgerald's dairy farm around Murphy Lane, Wollongong and began plans for a family home, the same year the steel works commenced operation. Hoskins was born in 1892 and joined the family's steel firm in 1907. He became joint managing director with his elder brother in 1924 and was directly involved with the move of the company to Port Kembla and the erection of the new works.

Sidney Hoskins married Helen Madoline (known as Madge) Loveridge in 1934 and a son was born to them at Edgecliff in 1936.

=== Residence ===
Hoskins commissioned his brother-in-law, Geoffrey Loveridge (1893–1989), to design Gleniffer Brae Manor House and had the gardens designed by Paul Sorensen. The name Gleniffer Brae comes from a small village in Paisley, Scotland, the birthplace of Mrs Hoskins' grandfather. Gleniffer Brae was designed by architect Geoffrey Loveridge, brother of Mrs Hoskins. The building of the residence began in 1937 through a tender by L. Benbow. The surveying work was undertaken by George Dunwoodie. The house was completed in 1939.

Unlike most architects of his time, Geoffrey Loveridge had long and thorough training in the building. This involved both a strong family tradition and personal experience. His building expertise was evident in his selection of the tradesmen for Gleniffer Brae: Benbow as builder, Todd and Son for joinery, Wilson's bricks and the Hawkesbury Sandstone Company. There is anecdotal evidence of Loveridge's careful supervision of the high quality detailing of Gleniffer Brae. Loveridge was not simply a new architect working for wealthy relatives who knew what they wanted. He designed the houses that Cecil and Sidney Hoskins intended: "Stockbroker Tudor" for Cecil and a bungalow complex for Sidney. In the latter case, at least, there are abundant signs of highly competent architectural design, giving unity to an array of single storey buildings. The Tudor features are carefully adapted to the basic design. Gleniffer Brae bears a mature Loveridge stamp.

The extensive landscaped gardens surrounding the manor were largely attributed to the landscape designer Paul Sorensen, a Danish-Australian garden designer who had worked for Hoskins' brother Cecil at his estate "Invergowrie", Exeter and who had become known to Cecil Hoskins through his work for Henri Van der Velde at "Everglades", Leura.

Sidney Hoskins had a reliable and loyal gardener for Gleniffer Brae, named Eric Winter. In 1921 Hoskins gave Winter 2.5 acres of land on the eastern boundary of his property that included a house named Cratloe, which stands today as the Botanic Gardens Discovery Centre. Council purchased this land in 1966 from the owner, who had bought it off Winter.

The impressive location and style of Gleniffer Brae was in keeping with the position of the Hoskins family with the social and financial circles of the day. In the immediate post-war years distinguished guests such as the Duke and Duchess of Gloucester, the Archbishop of York and Lady Baden-Powell were hosted at Gleniffer Brae.

=== School ===
With the death of Sidney, part of the property was donated for use as a Botanic Garden while the house and remaining grounds were sold to the Anglican Diocese of Sydney for its girls grammar school (SCEGGS) in 1954. This was a significant addition to the educational facilities of the region. The church operated SCEGGS at the site until 1975, when the school merged with The Illawarra Grammar School. The house was later listed for sale, before the school grounds were acquired by Wollongong City Council in 1978. Along with land previously bought from the school in 1976, the purchase allowed for the extension of the Wollongong Botanic Garden.

A memorandum of understanding was finalised in 1954 with Wollongong City Council for approximately 32 acres of land extending from Murphys Avenue to Northfields Avenue for the purposes of a Botanic Garden. It would take many years to see Hoskins' dream become a reality: the Botanic Gardens did not open to the public on a regular basis until 1971.

On 10 December 1959 R. H. Anderson, Director of the Royal Botanic Gardens, Sydney visited the Keiraville site and declared it good and recommended that expert advice be sought to prepare a design for a Botanic Garden. Ultimately the expert chosen was Professor Peter Spooner of the University of New South Wales. Spooner came up with an idea of a geographically based garden layout; which was unusual. Plants were grouped according to their country of origin rather than the more usual botanic family groups (Australasia; Indonesia and Malaysia; Pacific Islands; Europe; India; Africa; China & Korea; The Americas).

The first planting was an azalea (Rhododendron indicum cv. and R.kurume cv's), established in 1964 by original gardener, Jack Woodgate. In 1966, Council purchased Cratloe and in 1968 built the Sir Joseph Banks glasshouse. The Wollongong Botanic Garden was officially opened in September 1970, with 6000 people visiting in the first year.

Later when the Gardens were expanded and Council had hired Deane Miller as Parks & Gardens Controller and Director of Wollongong Botanic Gardens, it was determined that the geographical based garden concept was not working well and that a habitat planting system would better suit the expanded site. It was possible to develop microclimates in the garden - from the exposed dryland of the highest hill, to stone filled gullies and open grassland.

In 1976 a financial crisis forced SCEGGS to sell nearly 15.5 acres to Wollongong City Council and in 1978, the remaining grounds, including Gleniffer Brae passed into Council's possession via a notice of resumption. As a result, Council owned all the land that now comprises Gleniffer Brae, the University Soccer Fields (Kooloonbong Oval) and the Botanic Garden by 1978.

Since 1980, part of the manor house, school buildings and auditorium have been used as the Wollongong Conservatorium of Music and function centre under lease from Wollongong City Council. The remainder of the manor house and surrounding gardens have operated as a function venue by Wollongong City Council.

Hoskins was civic-minded and desired that Gleniffer Brae be used for educational purposes and that the surrounding land would become a botanic garden once his family no longer used the residence. Under Hoskins' will, part of the property became the nucleus of Wollongong Botanical Gardens.

The grounds have been subdivided with over half of the area, now known as Hoskins Park, being used as the Wollongong Botanic Gardens (open to the public on a regular basis from 1971. Apart from the Spinney, which is readily recognisable as part of the original garden, the changes necessary to adapt a domestic garden, no matter how big, to use as a public park have disguised Sorensen's work so that his hand is no longer visible over large areas. The simplification of maintenance around the conservatorium has also reduced his impact.

== Description ==
House

A picturesque single storey Tudor Revival style building designed by architect Geoffrey Loveridge, of complex plan, built of red textured brick with rock-faced sandstone trims (doors, window surrounds). A steep multi-gabled roof of multi-coloured Marseille tiled roof has projecting rafters, elaborate twisting chimneys. The roof's slit gable vents, ornately carved bargeboards and twisted chimneys are reminiscent of Edwin Lutyens. Tudor arched diamond patterned windows have sandstone mullions and facing the rear courtyard is a leadlighted bay window with deliberate archaizing breaks in the panes.

The interior has excellent carved doors and a central room with carved timber frieze and ribbed ceiling with stone bosses. The internal joinery i.e. panelling and framings including doors and frames being part of the panelling were constructed of using "Swedish Oak". Other details of note are pull-up flyscreens hidden in window sills, bathroom with original tiling and rainwater heads decorated with fleur-de-lis.

Grounds

Extensive grounds, courtyards, garden, stone walls and paving.

Garden Shed

Timber shed with tile roof built as part of the original estate.

Old Soils Testing Laboratory

Split level brick building first built as part of the girls' school then used by Council as a laboratory to test soils.

School Buildings

A double storey and a single storey school buildings in brick were built during the school era.

Auditorium

This is a 1970s brick building of one large room around 13x12m with 2 small auxiliary rooms.

Old Caretaker's Residence

This was originally brought from Mangerton and placed on the site as headmistress' residence c.1960. After the school closed it was occupied by the Council caretaker on site until 1992. It is leased as a private residence now.

Garden/Site

Immediately around the house are original stone walls and terraces, a fountain in a sunken circular area to the rear, sandstone driveway (2 tracks), gate pillars and a doll's house.

The site slopes north-east gently into a valley, rising on the far side to form a low hill which screens the suburbs of Wollongong from the house. Behind the house the dramatic view of Mount Keira rises to 460 metres provides a unique backdrop. The garden (4 acres around the house, out of 75 acres - mostly grazing land) was designed by Danish-Australian garden designer Paul Sorensen for/with the Hoskins family. Sorensen began tree planting as soon as the house was completed in 1938. Firstly he transplanted from the surrounding bush several large Illawarra flame trees (Brachychiton acerifolius) for immediate shelter and an appearance of maturity. Some of these survive (1990), and could be the earliest successful example of transplantation of mature Australian native trees, a process still regarded as almost impossible.

Also planted at this time were many brush box (Lophostemon confertus), wild plum (Harpephyllum afrum), London planes (Platanus × hispanica), silky oak (Grevillea robusta) and Jacaranda mimosifolia trees. An area known as the spinney, low on the nearside of the valley, was planted with hundreds of azaleas growing in the shade of a natural grove of turpentines (Syncarpia glomulifera). Sorensen's interest in native plants is revealed by the dominance of native species in this list and the presence in a prominent location of a very large specimen of coastal cypress pine (Callitris columellaris) which still survives in excellent health.

The driveway sweeping up the hill to the front of the house was constructed in a similar low-key fashion to that at Invergowrie, Exeter (Hoskins' brother Cecil's estate), with the drivestrips in this instance formed by sandstone flagging, carefully fitted together with lawn grasses creeping between the flags further visually subduing the whole drive.

Behind the house is an almost circular lawn with central pond and stone borders in a more formal manner. This is surrounded by trees and shrubs framing the view of Mount Kiera. Service areas to the south-east are separated from the formal garden with stone walls of similar construction and detailing as those at Everglades, Leura. This quarter was heavily planted for shelter from prevailing winds. Across the formal garden from the house a romantic playhouse for the children sits comfortably within the shrubs on the axis to the mountain, fulfilling the role of a summer house as a visual accent in the vegetation.

Other significant features of the garden are gravel paths, boundary wall, rustic "dolls house" of roughcast-covered fibro with unsawn timber posts and tiled roof, rustic gardener's shed of vertical boards with unsawn coverstrips and rafters, leadlight windows and tiled roof.

Condition

The physical condition of the property was reported as good as at 1 October 1997. The archaeological potential was assessed as low.

=== Modifications and dates ===
- 1937 – building began
- 1939 – construction completed
- 1954 – The house and grounds became a branch school for the Sydney Church of England Girls Grammar School
- 1978 – The school closed and was acquired by Wollongong City Council in 1978. The house is now used as a Conservatorium of Music and function centre.
- 1980+ – The grounds were subdivided with over half of the area, now known as Hoskins Park, being used as the local Botanic Gardens.

== Heritage listing ==
Gleniffer Brae is intimately associated with that period of Illawarra's history which saw the beginning of major economic development. It is associated with the Hoskins family and particularly Arthur Sidney Hoskins, pioneers of the steel industry and responsible for its creation and development at Port Kembla. The estate is thus not only a gentleman's residence but the manager's house for a large industrial complex. Sidney Hoskins, for whom the house and garden was designed and built, was instrumental establishing the Illawarra steel industry and made a significant contribution to the community life of Wollongong.

Gleniffer Brae forms a well designed residential estate in sympathy with the surrounding site which was selected for its topographical setting. It is associated with architect Geoffrey Loveridge and landscape designer Paul Sorensen. Gleniffer Brae exhibits a high quality of craftsmanship in the fabric of the original buildings. The detailing represents the finest in Australian building skills of the pre-war period and this is enhanced by the fact that its original fabric is more or less intact. The open space around the house permits a full appreciation of the scale and design of the house. The grounds' original garden design are very attractive in their own right.

The house constitutes a example of the Inter-war period English Tudor or Elizabethan Revival style of architecture, influenced by English architecture and adapted to the requirements of a single storey complex. The English Tudor or Elizabethan Revival style very much reflected the orientation and values of wealthy families in the period to World War II, who tended to look to Britain as the "Home" country, who had Royalist sympathies and who promoted attachment to "King and Empire".

The gardens constitute an integral part of the design and setting of the house and show the outcome of an integrated association between architect and landscape designer. The grounds' original garden design is representative of designer Paul Sorensen's ability to incorporate the surrounding landscape and flora into the overall design and to capture and extend the dramatic effect of the natural landscape through spatial planning, planting and construction of hard landscape elements. In the execution of the landscape design, Sorensen transplanted from the surrounding bush several large Illawarra flame trees (Brachychiton acerifolium), that is reputed to be one of the earliest successful examples of transplantation of mature Australian native trees, a process still regarded as almost impossible.

The estate's current use as now the Wollongong Botanic Gardens precinct and the house's current use as home of the Wollongong Conservatorium of Music continue the estate's association with the community and educational life of Wollongong and the Illawarra region.

Few capitalists associated with the mining and industrial development chose to live in the Illawarra. Gleniffer Brae stands apart as the only example of a "grand house" on a grand estate in the City of Wollongong. Gleniffer Brae together with Invergowrie at Exeter are a unique pair, both estates being the outcome of the collaboration between architect Geoffrey Loveridge and landscape designer Paul Sorensen, both built for two brothers Cecil and Sidney Hoskins family who each married a sister of Geoffrey Loveridge. Their rarity is heightened by the fact that the pair of estates survive as relatively intact outstanding examples of Interwar period architecture and landscape design

Gleniffer Brae was listed on the New South Wales State Heritage Register on 2 April 1999 having satisfied the following criteria.

The place is important in demonstrating the course, or pattern, of cultural or natural history in New South Wales.

Gleniffer Brae is intimately associated with that period of Illawarra's history which saw the beginning of major economic development. Sydney Hoskins for whom the house was designed and built was instrumental in establishment of the Illawarra steel industry and made a significant contribution to the community life of Wollongong. Gleniffer Brae is associated with architect Geoffrey Loveridge and landscape designer Paul Sorenson.

The place is important in demonstrating aesthetic characteristics and/or a high degree of creative or technical achievement in New South Wales.

Gleniffer Brae exhibits a quality of craftsmanship in the fabric of the original buildings. The detailing represents Australian building skills of the pre-war period and this is enhanced by the fact that its original fabric is more or less intact. The open space around the house permits appreciation of the scale and design of the house. The grounds original gardens design are attractive in their own right.

The place has strong or special association with a particular community or cultural group in New South Wales for social, cultural or spiritual reasons.

The English Tudor or Elizabethan revival architectural style of Glennifer Brae very much reflected the orientation and values of wealthy families in the period to WWII, who tended to look to Britain as the "Home" country, who has Royalist sympathies and who promoted attachment to "King and Empire". Its elaborate style displays wealth and power much as the manor did in English context. Few capitalists associated with mining and industrial development chose to live in the Illawarra. Glennifer Brae stands apart as the only example of a "grand house" in the City of Wollongong.

The place possesses uncommon, rare or endangered aspects of the cultural or natural history of New South Wales.

There is nothing else in the City of Wollongong comparable to this house, particularly from the 1930s.
