= Smiths Hill Fort =

Coordinates: 34°24′58.62″S 150°54′5.80″E

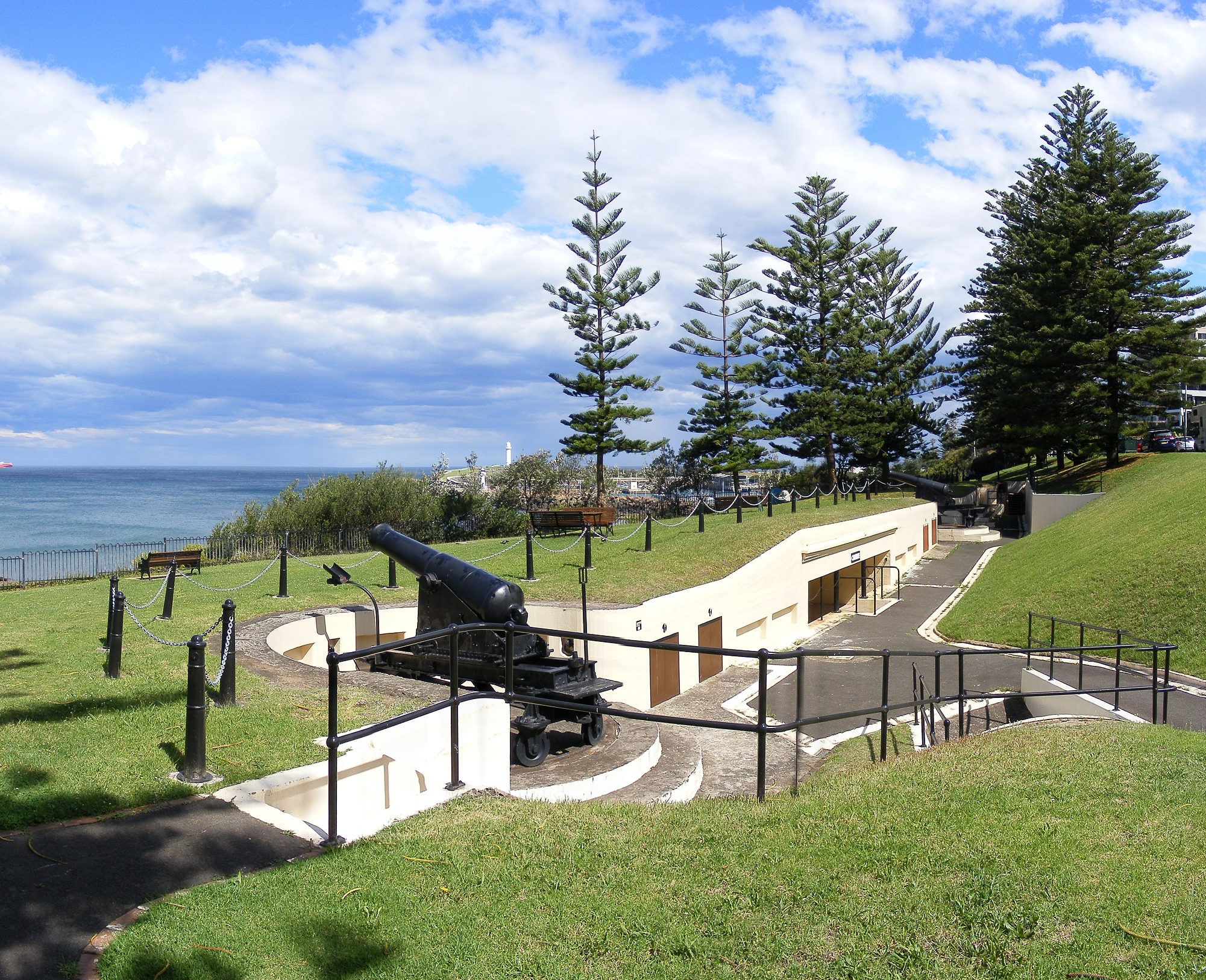
RML 80-pounder 5 ton (converted) gun at Smiths Hill Fort

Smiths Hill Fort is a former fort at North Wollongong, New South Wales, Australia. The fort was also known as Wollongong Fort.

== History ==
Built between 1891 and 1893 to provide a deterrent to a possible Russian attack upon Wollongong Harbour.

The fort is a concealed battery on high ground above Wollongong Harbour with underground rooms for supplies, ammunition and shelter with emplacements for two 80-pound cannons on iron carriages, and a 1 1/2 inch quick firing gun.

It was used extensively for company training and maintained by the Wollongong-Bulli Half Company.

In 1946, the fort was filled with rubble and dirt. The fort was dug out and restored in 1988 and two cannons were restored and reinstalled at the fort.

== Armaments ==
- 2 x RML 80 pound guns
- 1 x 1 1/2 inch Nordenfelt quick firing gun

== See also ==
- Military history of Australia
