= Mount Ousley Public School =

Primary Public School in NSW, Australia

Coordinates: 34.3989°S 150.8882°E

Location
- 31 McGrath St Fairy Meadow NSW 2519; Wollongong City Council, NSW

Information
- Type: Government co-educational Apple-distinguished primary government public day school
- Mottoes: Ever Higher; A small school with big opportunities
- Established: c. 1959
- School number: 02 4285 4211
- Principal: Emily Jones
- Staff: 30 Staff (2023)
- Grades: Kindergarten to grade six
- Gender: Co-educational
- Enrollment: 175 Students (2022)
- Classes: 8 Classes (2022)
- Average class size: 21 Students (2022)
- Colors: Green; Yellow
- Newspaper: https://mtousley-p.schools.nsw.gov.au/newsletter.html
- Budget: $1,928,426 (2022)
- Website: https://mtousley-p.schools.nsw.gov.au/

Mount Ousley Public School is a Kindergarten to grade six primary school, located in Fairy Meadow, New South Wales. The school was established in 1959, commonly known as 'MOPS'. In 2022, there were eight classes with 175 students in total, and 30 staff. The school is a secular government school primarily funded by NSW Department of Education and Parents and Citizens' Association (P&C).

== Apple-Distinguished Schools and the Use of Technology ==
MOPS is and has been an Apple-Distinguished School since 2011. The school made the use of iPads and MacBooks compulsory for all students, including kindergarteners since 2015, many students already had devices before this and the school provided students without iPads with iPads anyway. In 2018, MOPS was named NSW's Digital Lighthouse School, at the Technology 4 Learning Awards. The Illawarra Mercury has labelled the school as "trailblazing" and the "future".

== Canteen ==
MOPS offers a canteen for all students and staff to use, the canteen is offered in conjunction with NSW's Healthy School Canteens Strategy. The school offers sandwiches, wraps, hot foods including toasties, burgers and pizzas, salads, drinks and snacks.

== Timetable ==
The school opens its gates at 8:30 am, and classes start at 9 am. Shortly after, students will have a "Crunch and Sip break" (Crunch&Sip) which promotes health eating. Students will be allowed to go outside into the courtyard during lunch and recess. Classes will finish at 3 pm.

== Assessments ==
The school participates in Grade 3 and Grade 5 NAPLAN, New South Wales' Best Start Kindergarten Assessment and New South Wales' Validation of Assessment for Learning and Individual Development or commonly known as VALID. And helps students also participate in NSW Selective high schools and opportunity classes.

== Uniform ==
Uniform is compulsory for students of all ages, this is in conjunction with NSW Department of Education’s School Uniform Policy. Uniform can be purchased on Monday afternoons at the school, or uniform can be ordered online with the My School Connect app. Because the school is co-educational, uniform is offered for males and females. And since the school offers physical education classes in coordination with the NSW Education Standards Authority (NESA), they have dedicated sport uniform for all of the four houses.

== Diversity ==
Percentage (%) of Diversity of Students
1. Non-English speaking background (28.0%)
2. Aboriginal and Torres Strait Island background (3.00%)
3. English speaking background (69.0%)

MOPS boasts a highly diverse cohort and group of staff. The 2022 Annual Report states that, 28% of the currently enrolled students are from non-English speaking backgrounds, and a further 3% coming from Aboriginal and Torres Strait Island background. 3.7% of teachers and support staff also identify as coming from Aboriginal and Torres Strait Island background.

== NAPLAN ==
Mount Ousley participates in NAPLAN. In 2022, all year 3 and year 5 NAPLAN scores have increased from 2014.

Year 3 NAPLAN Scores
Year	Reading	Writing	Spelling	Grammar	Numeracy
2022	488	438	435	489	430
2021	480	442	454	468	441
2020	Cancelled due to COVID				
2019	465	426	428	485	427
2018	456	434	434	434	405
2017	444	416	424	441	414
2016	418	418	413	408	380
2015	455	428	395	442	397
2014	412	425	415	412	386

Year 5 NAPLAN Scores
Year	Reading	Writing	Spelling	Grammar	Numeracy
2022	521	535	507	508	483
2021	537	499	480	515	493
2020	Cancelled due to COVID				
2019	509	480	510	508	499
2018	512	478	506	514	481
2017	513	480	490	494	499
2016	498	463	483	483	473
2015	531	511	536	537	481
2014	511	472	480	507	480

== See also ==
- Keira High School
- Department of Education (New South Wales)
- NAPLAN
