= Mount Ousley =

- Suburb
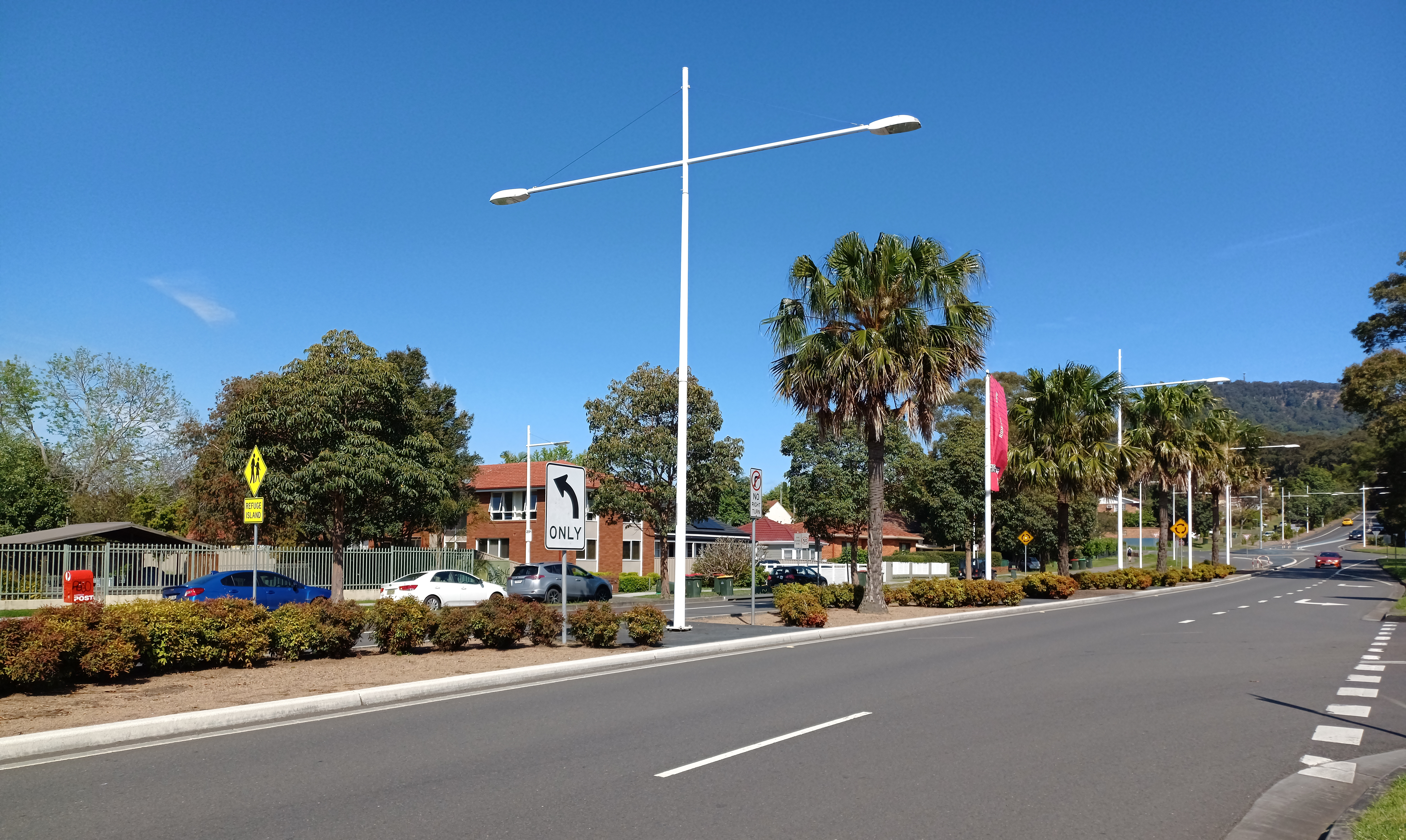

- Coordinates: 34°24′S 150°52′E
- Country: Australia
- State: New South Wales
- City: Wollongong
- LGA: City of Wollongong
- Location: 80 km (50 mi) from Sydney; 4 km (2.5 mi) from Wollongong

Government
  - State electorate: Keira
  - Federal division: Cunningham
- Elevation: 45 m (148 ft)

Population
  - Total: 1,611 (2021 census)
- Postcode: 2519
Suburbs around Mount Ousley
Mount Pleasant		Fairy Meadow
	Mount Ousley	Fairy Meadow
Mount Keira	Keiraville	North Wollongong

Mount Ousley is a residential suburb situated on the foothills of Mount Keira about four kilometres northwest from the city of Wollongong, New South Wales, Australia. It is also the name of the road which crosses the nearby Illawarra Escarpment and is adjacent to the University of Wollongong. Mount Ousley has a public school, Mount Ousley Public School in Fairy Meadow.
