= Electoral district of Keira =

Keira New South Wales—Legislative Assembly
- Interactive map of district boundaries from the 2023 state election
- State: New South Wales
- Dates current: 1988–present
- MP: Ryan Park
- Party: Labor
- Namesake: Mount Keira
- Electors: 58,824 (2019)
- Area: 204.43 km^{2} (78.9 sq mi)
- Demographic: Provincial
Electorates around Keira:
Wollondilly	Heathcote	Pacific Ocean
Wollondilly	Keira	Wollongong
Wollondilly	Shellharbour	Wollongong

Keira (/ˈkɪərə/) is an electoral district of the Legislative Assembly in the Australian state of New South Wales. It is currently represented by Ryan Park of the Labor Party.

== History ==
Keira was established in 1988 largely as a replacement to the seat of Corrimal. Like its predecessor, it is a safe seat for the Labor Party. Labor have only ever fallen below 60 percent of the two-party preferred vote three times; twice to the Liberal Party in 1988 and 2011 and once to an independent in 1999.

== Geography ==
Keira is a northern Illawarra electorate, currently taking in the northern and western Wollongong suburbs of Figtree, Keiraville, Mount Ousley, Mount Pleasant, Balgownie, Corrimal, Bellambi, Woonona, Bulli, Thirroul, Austinmer and Coledale.

== Members for Keira ==
Member	Party	Term
Col Markham	Labor	1988–1999
David Campbell	Labor	1999–2011
Ryan Park	Labor	2011–present

== Election results ==
2023 New South Wales state election: Keira
Party	Candidate	Votes	%	±%
Labor	Ryan Park	28,938	57.8	+4.3
Liberal	Noah Shipp	10,924	21.8	−5.7
Greens	Kit Docker	7,297	14.6	+1.7
Sustainable Australia	Andrew Anthony	2,867	5.7	+1.7
Total formal votes		50,026	96.9	+0.2
Informal votes		1,589	3.1	−0.2
Turnout		51,615	89.6	−2.0
Two-party-preferred result
Labor	Ryan Park	34,592	74.2	+5.9
Liberal	Noah Shipp	12,059	25.8	−5.9
Labor hold		Swing	+5.9	
