= Keiraville =

- Suburb
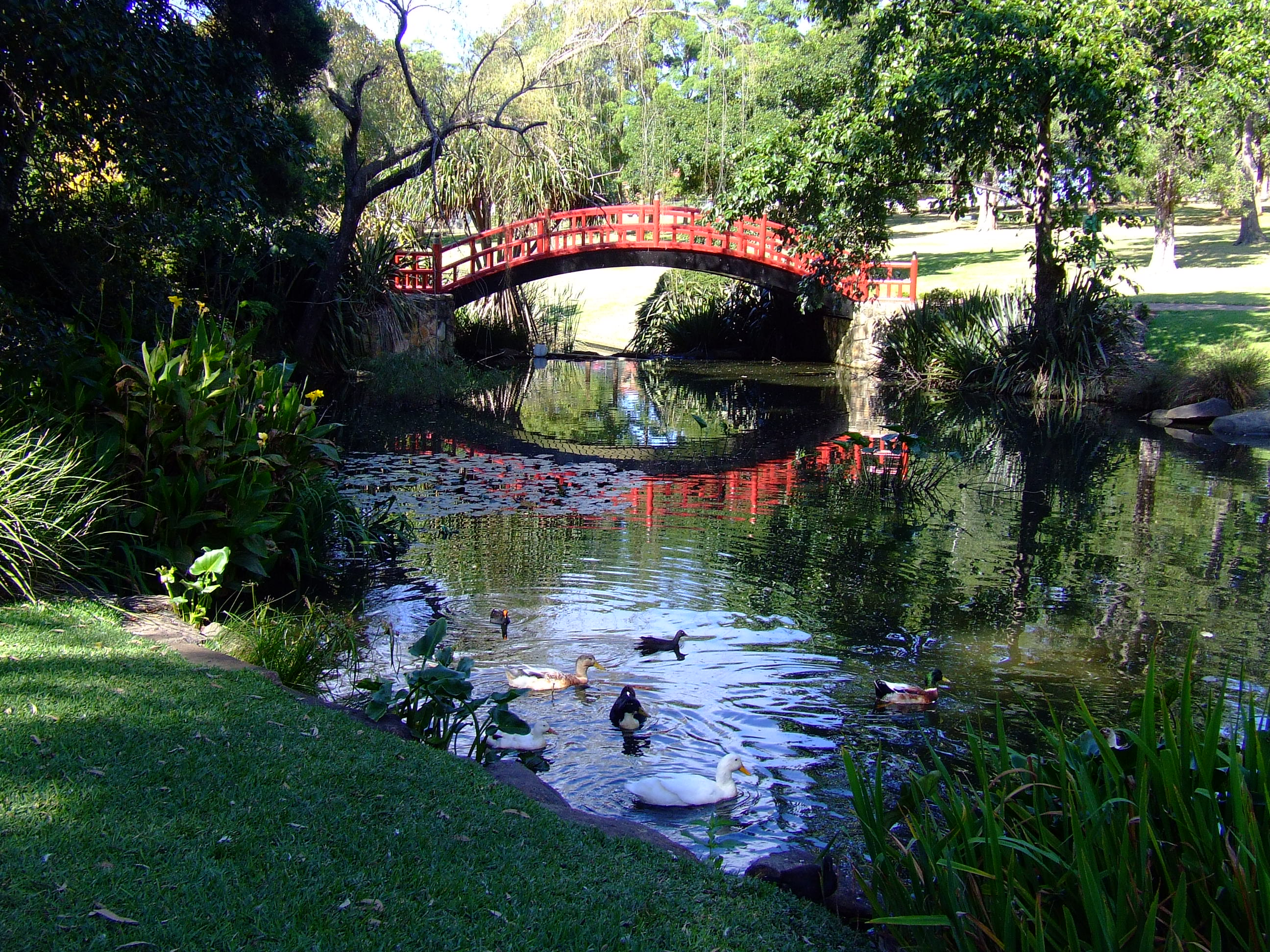
- Wollongong Botanic Garden

- Coordinates: 34°23′S 150°52′E
- Country: Australia
- State: New South Wales
- City: Wollongong
- LGA: City of Wollongong
- Location: 84 km (52 mi) from Sydney; 3 km (1.9 mi) from Wollongong

Government
  - State electorate: Keira
  - Federal division: Cunningham

Area
  - Total: 3.3 km^{2} (1.3 sq mi)
- Elevation: 40 m (130 ft)

Population
  - Total: 4,001 (2021 census)
  - Density: 1,212/km^{2} (3,140/sq mi)
- Postcode: 2500
Suburbs around Keiraville
Mount Pleasant	Mount Ousley
Mount Keira	Keiraville	North Wollongong, Gwynneville
	West Wollongong

Keiraville is an inner suburb of the city of Wollongong, New South Wales, Australia in the Illawarra region. It is situated in the foothills of Mount Keira, approximately three kilometres northwest of Wollongong.

== Description ==
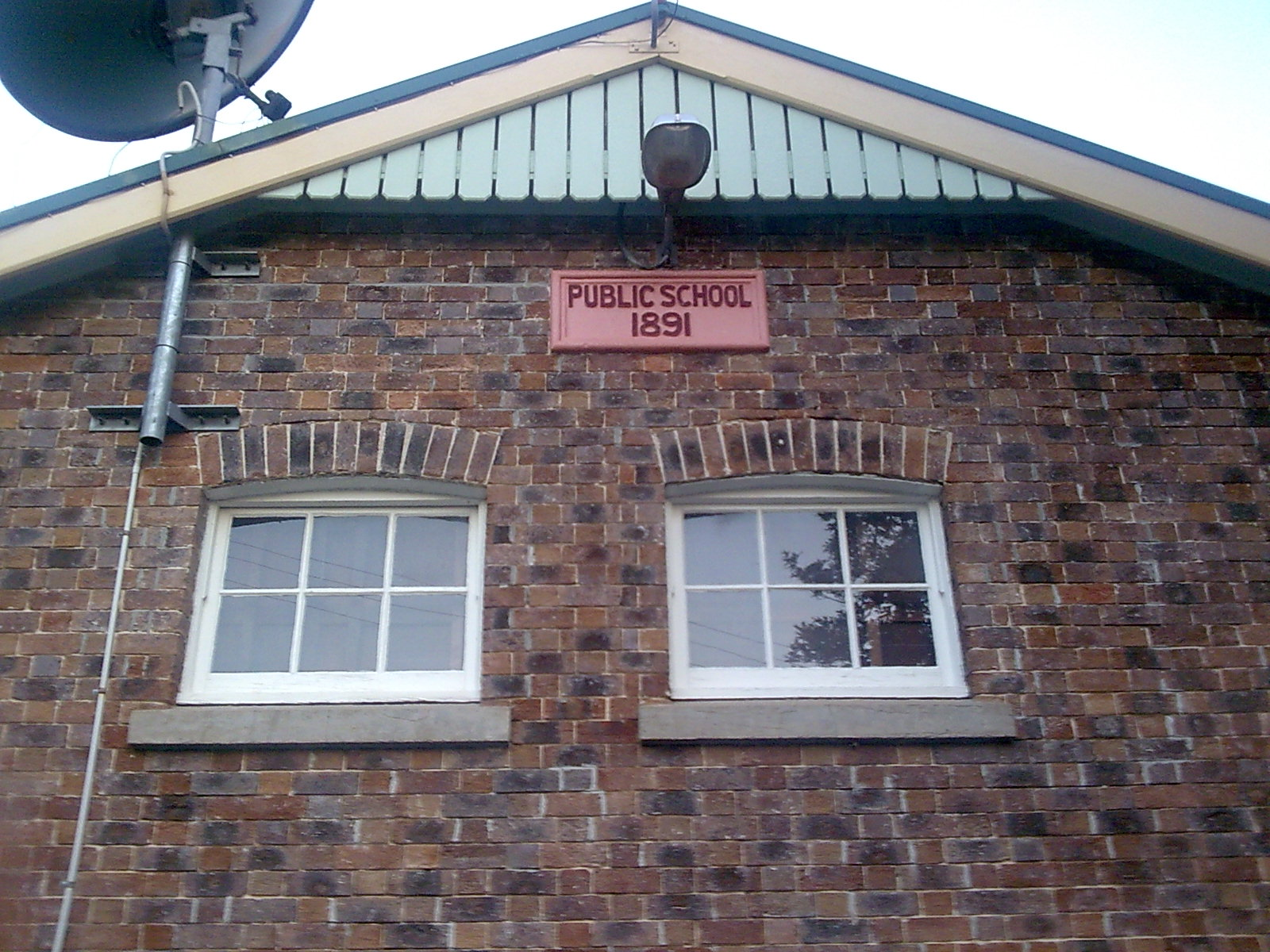
Original Keiraville Public School building

Keiraville has a public school (the Keiraville Public School), post office and several shops located on Gipps Road.

Keiraville (and its neighbour Gwynneville) is known as a university town, home to the main campus of the University of Wollongong.

Another major landmark, Wollongong Botanic Garden, is situated between Northfields Avenue and Murphys Avenue, and includes the Wollongong Conservatorium of Music.

== Keiraville Public School ==
The local Keiraville Public School was established in 1891 for the local farmers, miners and their families of the area (particularly of Port Kembla and other coal mining areas).

The grounds consist of two fields and a series of demountables and fixed buildings.

== Heritage listings ==
Keiraville has a number of heritage-listed sites, including:

- Murphys Avenue: Gleniffer Brae

== Population ==
In the 2021 Census, there were 4,001 people in Keiraville. 66.4% of people were born in Australia. The next most common countries of birth were India 4.0% and China 3.2%. 71.0% of people spoke only English at home. Other languages spoken at home included Mandarin at 4.0%. The most common responses for religion were No Religion 41.1%, Catholic 17.0% and Anglican 11.0%.

== See also ==
- University of Wollongong
- Wollongong Botanic Garden
- Wollongong Conservatorium of Music
