= Keira High School =

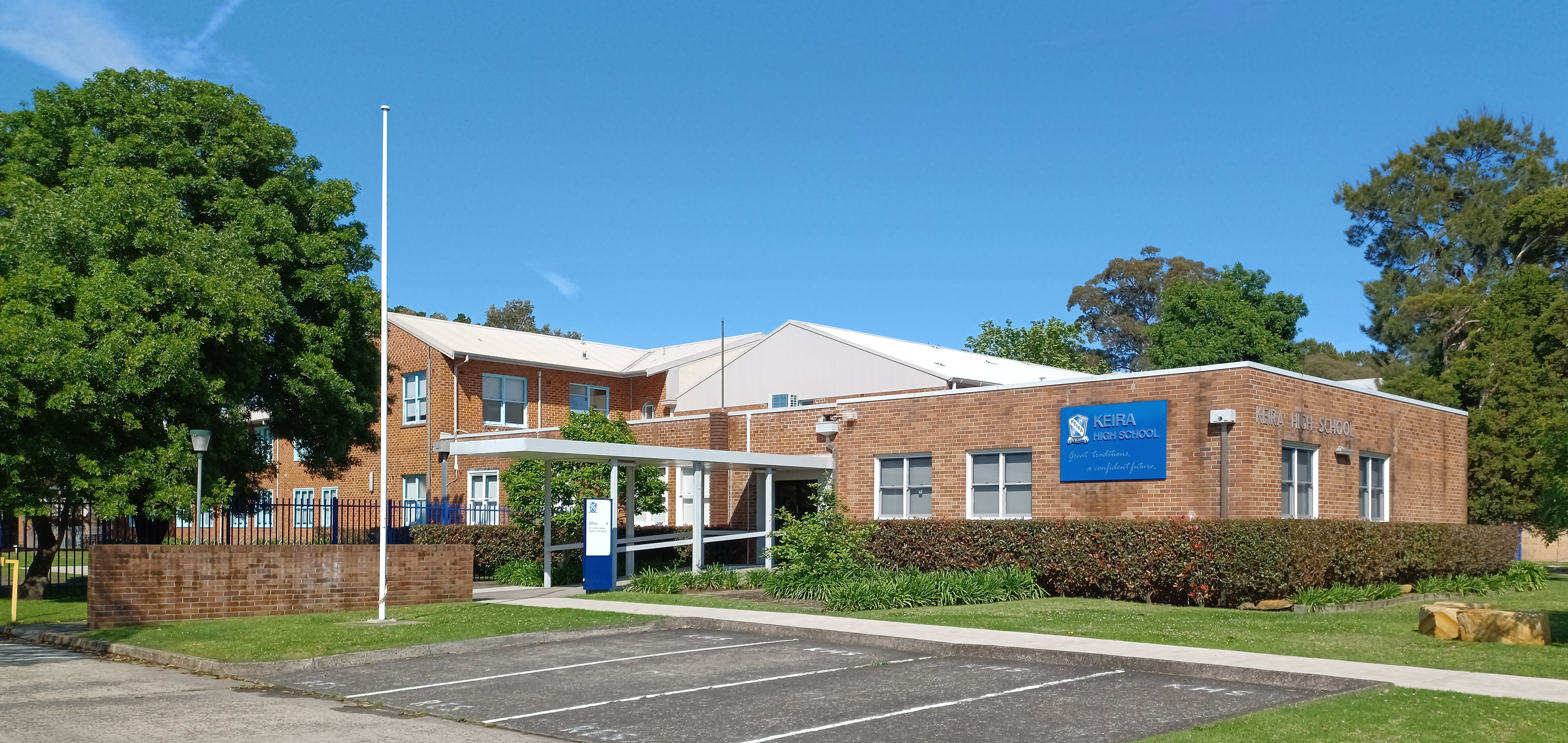

Location
- Lysaght Street, North Wollongong, New South Wales; Australia
- 34°24′21″S 150°53′16″E

Information
- Former names: Wollongong Junior Secondary Technical School; Wollongong Technical College; Keira Boys' High School; Wollongong Secondary Technical School; Keira High School; Keira Technology High School
- Type: Government-funded co-educational comprehensive secondary day school
- Motto: Latin: Excelsior (Reaching Higher)
- Established: 1917; 109 years ago (as Wollongong Junior Secondary Technical School)
- School district: Illawarra
- Educational authority: New South Wales Department of Education
- Principal: Scott Frazier
- Teaching staff: 68.7 FTE (2018)
- Years: 7–12
- Enrolment: 899 (2018)
- Campus: Suburban
- Colours: Light blue, navy blue and white
- Slogan: Great traditions, a confident future
- Website: keira-h.schools.nsw.gov.au

Keira High School (abbreviated as KHS) is a government-funded co-educational comprehensive secondary day school, located in Lysaght Street, North Wollongong, in the Illawarra region of New South Wales, Australia.

Established in 1917 as the Wollongong Junior Secondary Technical School at a different location, the school enrolled approximately 900 students in 2018, from Year 7 to Year 12, of whom five percent identified as Indigenous Australians and forty percent were from a language background other than English. The school is operated by the New South Wales Department of Education.

== History ==
Keira High School was formed through the amalgamation of Wollongong Junior Secondary Technical School (1917–1945) and Wollongong Technical College (1945–1954), and Keira Boys' High School (1954–1984). The school then became known as Keira Boys High School, operating from the Lysaght Street site. At some point between 1954 and 1960, the school was briefly named as Wollongong Secondary Technical School; before reverting to Keira Boys' High School in 1960, and remained as such until 1984. Since that time the school has pioneered the integration of technology and design into the curriculum.

Since its establishment in 1917, the school has had a variety of names:

- Wollongong Junior Secondary Technical School (1917–1945)
- Wollongong Technical College (1945–1954)
- Keira Boys High School (1954–1984)
- Keira High School (1985–1990)
- Keira Technology High School (1990–2005)
- Keira High School (2005–present)

== Overview ==
Keira High School offers a wide range of subjects including Japanese and Japanese Cultural Understanding.

The KHS campus is located in the heart of Wollongong's education district. It is bordered on the west by the TAFE-Illawarra Institute, on the east by Wollongong High School of the Performing Arts, and is a three-minute walk from the University of Wollongong.

Student activities and achievements include:

- An inter-school Christian Fellowship was active during the 1960s
- An Interact Club was formed in 1967
- In 1967 the then principal, Jack Johnstone, introduced inter-school debating

== Notable alumni ==
- Kalervo Kummola (graduated 1962), Finnish ice hockey executive, businessman, and politician
- Jack Cockington - Water Polo player. Cockington played 11 Australian Water Polo League matches for the Cronulla Sharks Water Polo Club in the 2018 season.
- Sam Rolfe - Water Polo player. Rolfe currently plays in the Australian Water Polo League, making his debut for the UNSW Wests Magpies in the 2026 season.

== See also ==
- List of government schools in New South Wales: G–P
- List of schools in Illawarra and the South East
- Education in Australia
