= Balgownie Migrant Workers Hostel =

- Location within New South Wales Location within Australia
- 34.3974°S 150.8996°E
- Location: Squires Way, Fairy Meadow, City of Wollongong, New South Wales, Australia

History
- Built: 1950–1951

Site notes
- Architect: Peter Norman Nissen (Original Nissen Hut)

New South Wales Heritage Register
- Official name: Balgownie Migrant Workers Hostel: Huts 201, 204 and 210; Balgownie Migrant Workers' Hostel; Fairy Meadow Migrant Hostel; University of Wollongong Campus East; Science Centre; Nissen & Quonset Huts Wollongong
- Type: state heritage (complex / group)
- Designated: 28 August 2009
- Reference no.: 1767
- Type: Migrant Hostel
- Category: Transient Accommodation
- Builders: Concrete Constructions Pty Ltd

Balgownie Migrant Workers Hostel is a heritage-listed former migrant hostel at Squires Way, Fairy Meadow, in the Illawarra region of New South Wales, Australia. It was built from 1950 to 1951 by Concrete Constructions Pty Ltd. The surviving remnants of the hostel are Huts 201, 204 and 210. It is also known as the Fairy Meadow Migrant Hostel. The site is now used for student accommodation as part of the University of Wollongong's Campus East. It was added to the New South Wales State Heritage Register on 28 August 2009.

== History ==
The buildings numbered 201, 204, and 210 are remnants of the Balgownie Migrant Workers Hostel. The Hostel was constructed in late 1950 and 1951 as a migrant workers hostel to meet the demand for housing created by a Commonwealth government policy for increased immigration.

At the same time around the rest of the state there were numerous other hostels built to meet the demands brought about by the immigration policy. The Balgownie Migrant Hostel was built by Concrete Constructions Pty Ltd, the contract being let in October 1950 and occupied in December 1951. The hostel was later renamed Fairy Meadow Migrant Hostel and continued operation until 1982.

The property was purchased by the University of Wollongong for student accommodation in June 1987. About 1989 the building known as 201 a former dining hall was converted for use as the Science Centre and was later used as a childcare centre.

The first Nissen Hut was designed by Canadian Lieutenant Colonel Peter Norman Nissen in 1916. In World War II the Nissen Hut design was modified and extensively used in military activities. The Nissen Hut was copied by Americans in the Quonset hut and evolved to become quite different by the end of WWII.

The buildings numbered 201, 204 and 210 are remnants of the hostel completed in 1951. They were part of a large complex of huts divided into blocks around common dining room and laundry buildings.

== Description ==
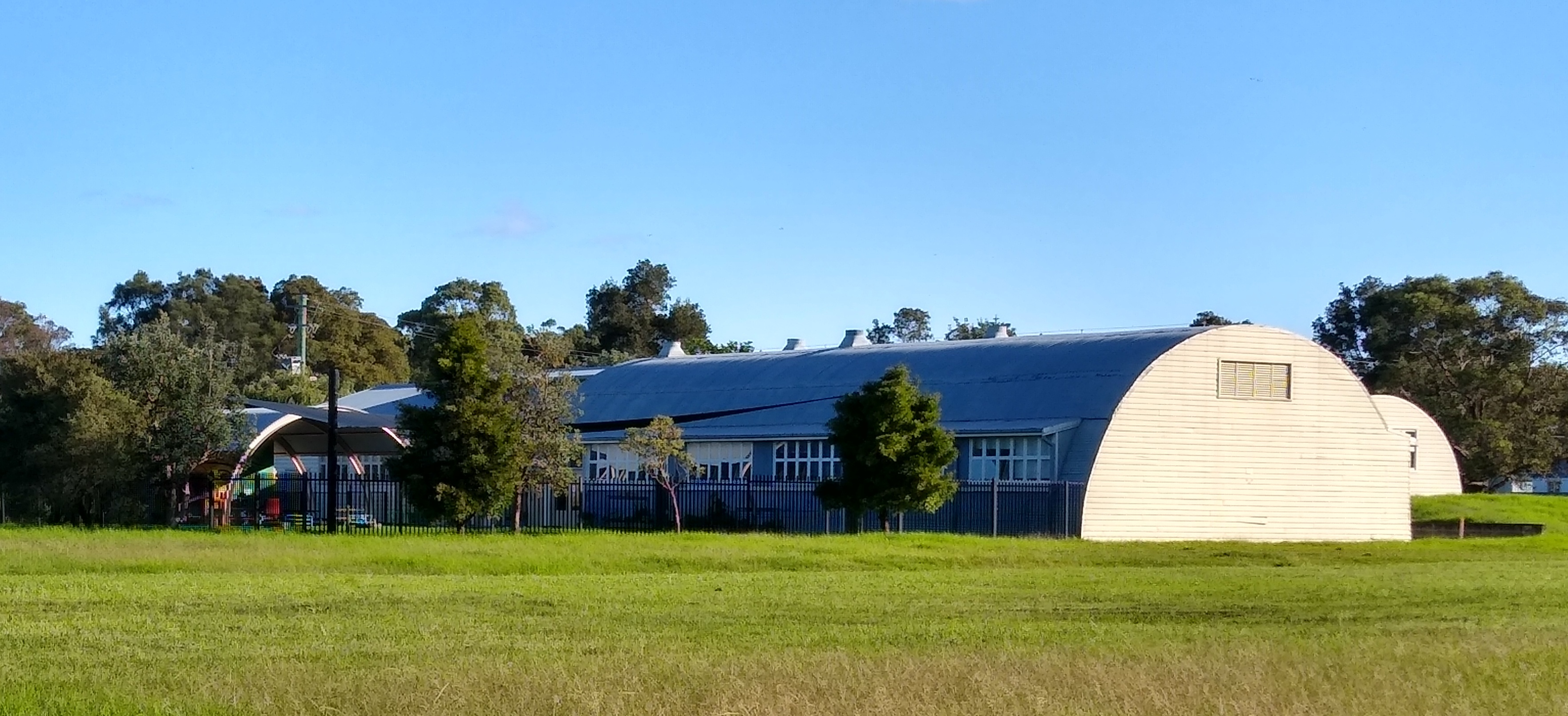
Building 201

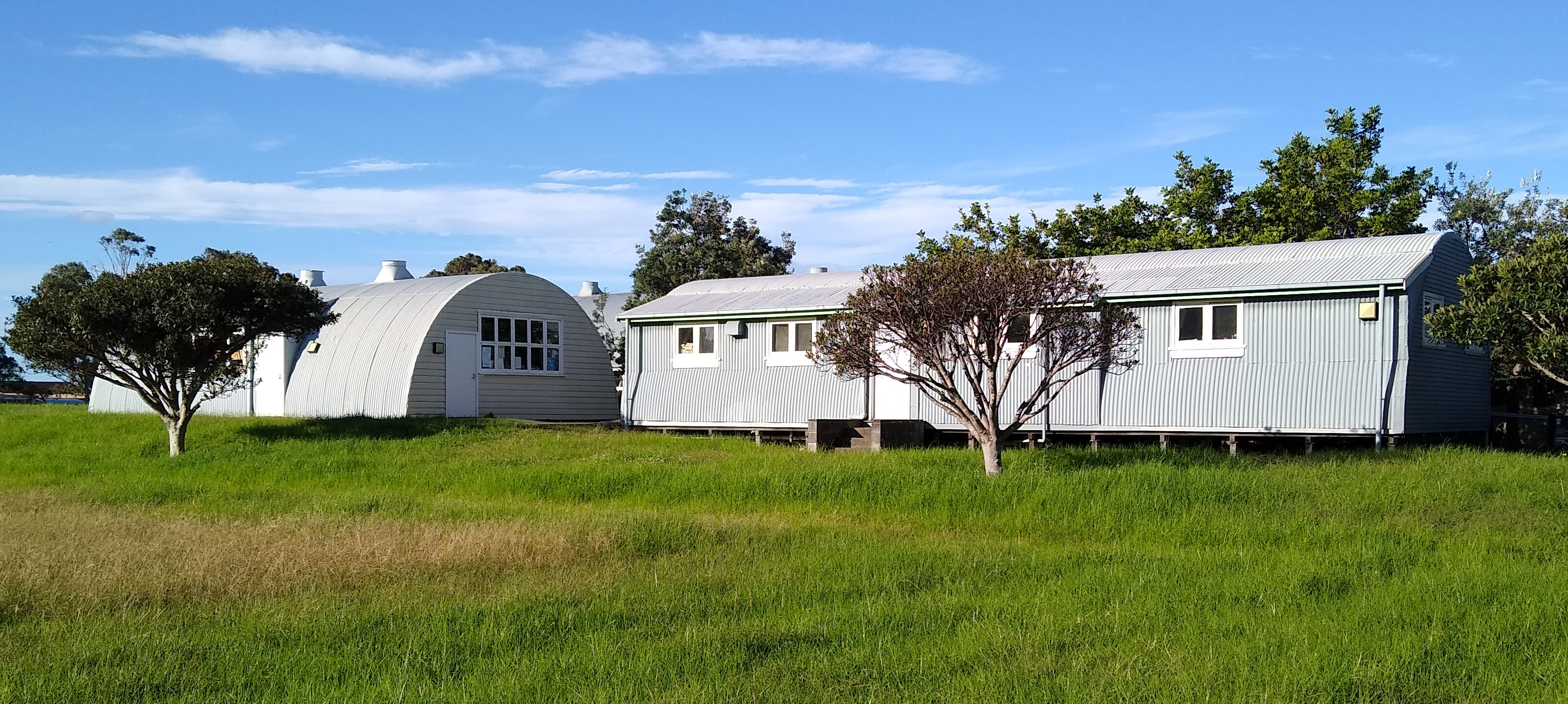
Buildings 204 and 210

Building 201

Former Migrant Hostel Kitchen/Dining Room, then a university science centre and currently conserved, refurbished and used as a child care facility. The building has three parts: a single storey weatherboard clad kitchen area with clerestory ventilation; a 100 ft × 41 ft (30 m × 12 m) Quonset hut with curved corrugated steel roof/walls; a gable roofed corrugated steel clad extension

Building 204

Former Migrant hostel Laundry Exchange, next the university library/ bookstore and now conserved and ready for occupation by unspecified university services. The building has two parts. The western section is a 25 ft × 43 ft (7.6 m × 13.1 m) Nissen hut. The eastern section c. 1980 concrete block and metal deck structure.

Building 210

Former Migrant Hostel staff residence, now conserved, refurbished and awaiting occupation by unspecified university services. This is a 21 ft × 53 ft (6.4 m × 16.2 m) Quonset hut.

=== Condition ===
The condition of the buildings was reported to be excellent as at 14 September 2006, following thorough conservation carried out in 2004/5. The larger Quonset hut (building 201) is in use as a childcare facility. Buildings 204 and 210 are ready for occupation by University of Wollongong services. Buildings 204 and 210 have been moved from their former flood-prone location to a raised berm near building 201. Improved site drainage protects building 201 from all but one-in-one-hundred-year flooding.

There is little archaeological potential however there is substantial documentary evidence available, and former residents of the hostel still around to be able to tell the story of the site without the need for archaeological work.

The huts are reasonably intact.

=== Modifications and dates ===
Since closure of the Hostel, in 1982, the buildings had been adapted, some repeatedly, for use by the University of Wollongong. All three buildings were conserved in 2005. The larger Quonset hut (building 201) is in use as a childcare facility. Buildings 204 and 210 are ready for occupation by University of Wollongong services. In 2005, buildings 204 and 210 were moved from their former flood-prone location to a raised berm immediately to the west of building 201. The berm also protects building 210 from flooding on its western side while improved site drainage to the north and east protects it from all but one-in-one-hundred-year flooding.

== Heritage listing ==
The Nissen hut (building 204) and the two Quonset huts (buildings 201 and 210) have historical significance as physical evidence of the Balgownie Migrant Workers Hostel that was constructed at Fairy Meadow in 1950 and 1951 (and in use until 1982) as part of an Australia-wide post-World War II immigration program. This immigration program had wide-ranging impacts upon the development and growth of Wollongong. The two Nissen huts and one Quonset are locally rare, as other buildings of the period have not survived at the other Wollongong migrant hostel sites set up at that time (in Unanderra and Berkeley). They are also rare on a Statewide basis as surviving Nissen and Quonset huts adapted for use at a former New South Wales migrant hostel site.

These structures have an historical association with author Mary Rose Liverani and with the community of migrants who started their Australian life at the hostel before moving on to become influential in the economic and cultural life of Wollongong.

The buildings have some technical significance relating to the adaptation of Nissen and Quonset huts which have been modified for use at a migrant hostel location.

The buildings and their location have social significance due to the community of past residents and their descendants who have strong emotional ties to the site and still live in the Wollongong district.

Balgownie Migrant Workers Hostel was listed on the New South Wales State Heritage Register on 28 August 2009 having satisfied the following criteria.

The place is important in demonstrating the course, or pattern, of cultural or natural history in New South Wales.

These buildings are the only physical evidence on site of the former Balgownie Migrant Workers Hostel as built in 1951. The pattern of migration after WWII is clearly evidenced by these buildings. The history of the development of Australia and particularly Wollongong was heavily influenced by migration. The evidence of migration at this period is rare. Nissen and Quonset huts were commonly used at hostel sites throughout NSW however there are very few examples surviving today.

The place has a strong or special association with a person, or group of persons, of importance of cultural or natural history of New South Wales's history.

The subject site has been the subject of a number of works of literature. Notably "The Winter Sparrows" by Mary Rose Liverani who documents her own experiences of growing up at the hostel. There is a significant community surviving today who have very strong connection with the former hostel.

The place is important in demonstrating aesthetic characteristics and/or a high degree of creative or technical achievement in New South Wales.

The Nissen and Quonset huts have some technical interest as examples of World War ii period prefabricated buildings which have been adapted for migrant hostel use. These buildings are the only surviving landmarks of the former Balgownie Migrant Workers Hostel.

The place has strong or special association with a particular community or cultural group in New South Wales for social, cultural or spiritual reasons.

The Wollongong community has a large number of people who were post-war migrants or are descended from post war migrants. This community has demonstrated esteem for these buildings through groups such as the Migration Heritage Project.

The place has potential to yield information that will contribute to an understanding of the cultural or natural history of New South Wales.

The Nissen and Quonset huts are good examples of prefabricated post World War II buildings which have been adapted for uses such as accommodation, laundry, dining and administration at a migrant hostel.

The place possesses uncommon, rare or endangered aspects of the cultural or natural history of New South Wales.

The buildings are the only surviving evidence of a migrant hostel in the local area. They are also rare at a state level as only known surviving Nissen and Quonset huts at a migrant hostel site.

The place is important in demonstrating the principal characteristics of a class of cultural or natural places/environments in New South Wales.

Buildings 201, 204 and 210 are relatively intact examples of Nissen and Quonset huts previously used as a migrant hostel. They exemplify the era of Government sponsored post-war migration to Australia and the provisions for implementation of that policy. As landmarks these structures are held in high esteem by the community, particularly by the descendants of the migrants themselves, many of whom continue to live in the area.
