= Fairy Meadow railway station =

Railway station in New South Wales, Australia

Fairy Meadow
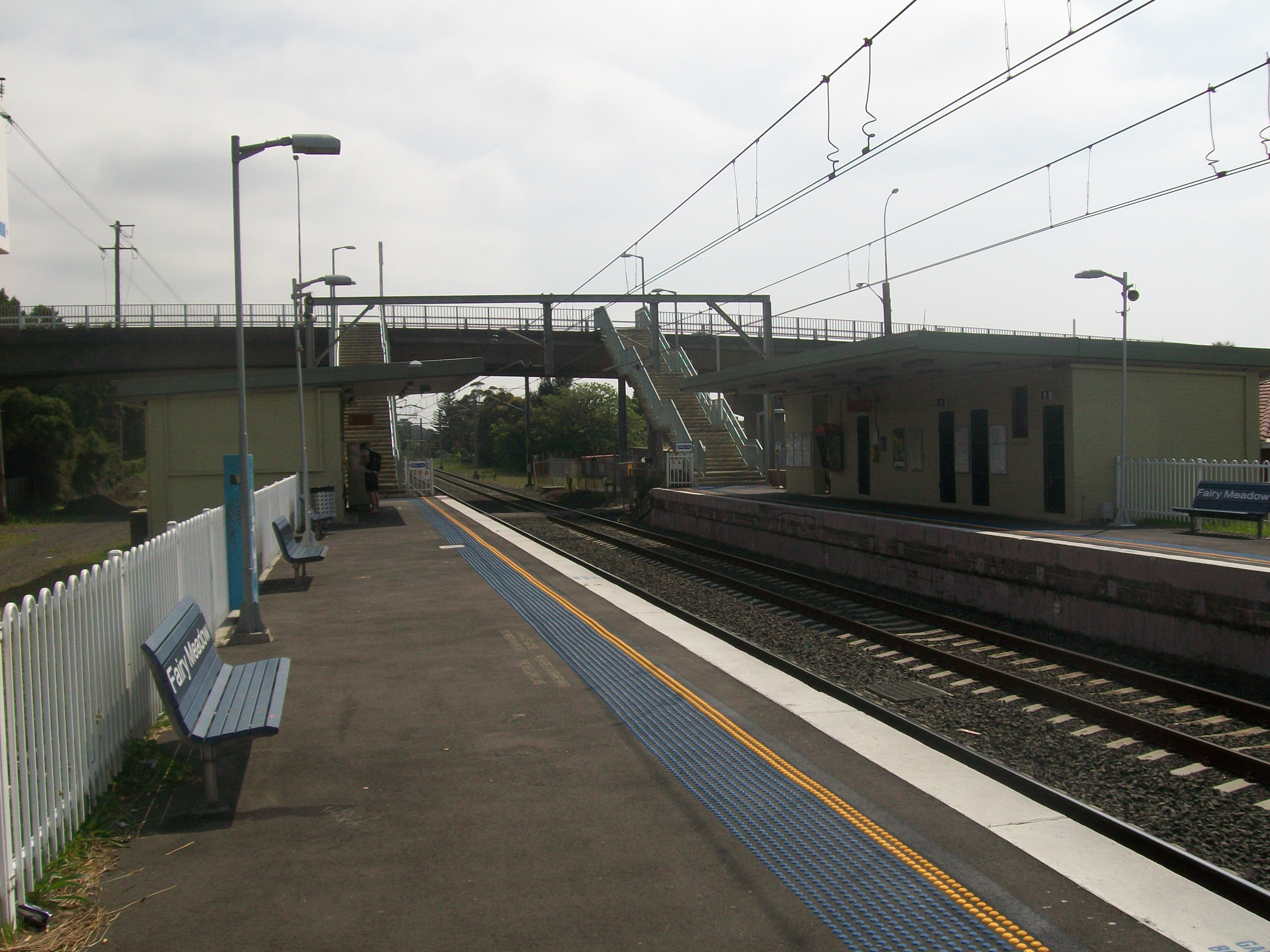
- Northbound view from Platform 1, October 2011

General information
- Location: Elliotts Road, Fairy Meadow; Australia
- Coordinates: 34°23′42″S 150°53′47″E
- Elevation: 7 metres (23 ft)
- Owner: Transport Asset Manager of New South Wales
- Operator: Sydney Trains
- Line: South Coast
- Distance: 79.36 km (49.31 mi) from Central
- Platforms: 2 side
- Tracks: 2

Construction
- Structure type: Ground
- Parking: Yes
- Accessible: Yes

Other information
- Status: Weekdays: Staffed: 5.35am to 9.35am, 2pm to 6pm: Weekends and public holidays: Unstaffed
- Station code: FNW
- Website: Transport for NSW

History
- Opened: 1887
- Former names: Cramsville (1887–1888); Para-meadow (1888–1909); Balgownie (1909–1956)

Passengers
- 2023: 63,040 (year); 173 (daily) (Sydney Trains, NSW TrainLink)

Services
Preceding station	Intercity Trains	Following station
North Wollongong towards Kiama or Port Kembla	South Coast Line	Towradgi towards Central or Bondi Junction
Location
- Location within New South Wales

Fairy Meadow railway station is located on the South Coast railway line in New South Wales, Australia. It serves the northern Wollongong suburb of Fairy Meadow opening in 1887 as Cramsville. It was renamed Para-meadow on 3 October 1888, Balgownie on 13 December 1909 and Fairy Meadow in January 1956.

The station underwent maintenance in 2011 which saw the resurfacing of platforms, new garden beds and the repainting of exterior surfaces. The pedestrian level crossing was upgraded in 2013. In 2019 the station received major accessibility upgrades. Two elevators to connect station platforms with the Elliott's Road overpass were installed, along with accessible toilets and updated security features. The pedestrian level crossing was removed.

== Platforms and services ==
Fairy Meadow has two side platforms serviced by Sydney Trains South Coast line services travelling from Waterfall and Thirroul to Port Kembla. Some peak hour and late night services operate to Sydney Central, Bondi Junction and Kiama.

Platform	Line	Stopping pattern	Notes
1	SCO	services to Thirroul & Waterfall peak hour & late night services to Sydney Central & Bondi Junction	
2	SCO	services to Port Kembla peak hour & late night services to Kiama	
