= Balgownie, New South Wales =

Balgownie
- Suburb
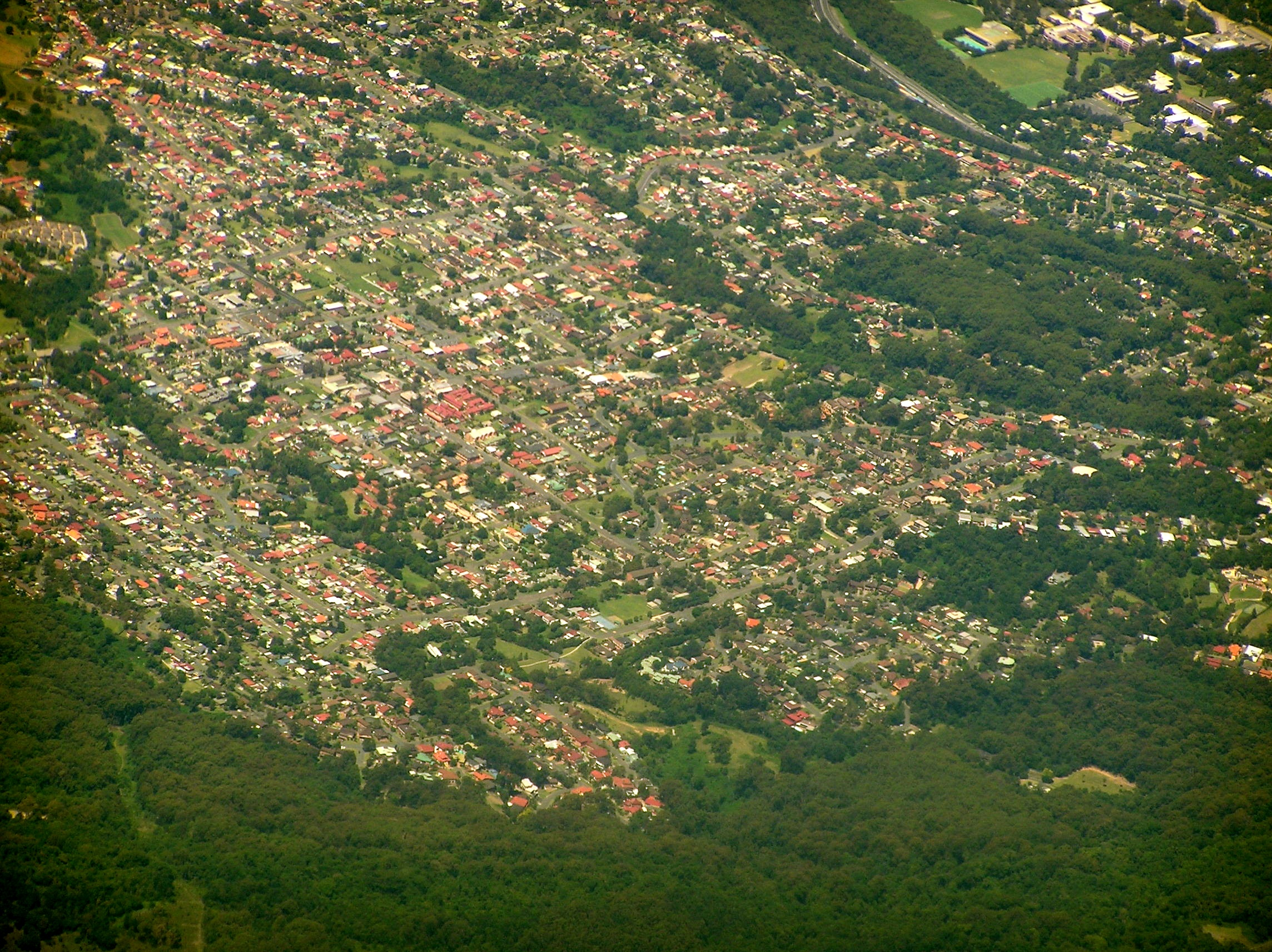
- Aerial photo

- Coordinates: 34°23′19.72″S 150°52′39.36″E
- Country: Australia
- State: New South Wales
- City: Wollongong
- LGA: City of Wollongong
- Location: 84 km (52 mi) from Sydney; 5 km (3.1 mi) from Wollongong

Government
  - State electorate: Keira
  - Federal division: Cunningham
- Elevation: 45 m (148 ft)

Population
  - Total: 5,722 (2021 census)
- Postcode: 2519
Suburbs around Balgownie
	Tarrawanna	Fernhill
	Balgownie	Fairy Meadow
Mount Keira	Mount Pleasant, Mount Ousley	Fairy Meadow

Balgownie (/bælɡaʊni/) is a small suburb of Wollongong, New South Wales, Australia.

Balgownie lies to the north-west of the Wollongong CBD. It stretches from the lower slopes of Mount Keira along the Illawarra escarpment to the base of the Broker's Nose promontory. To the east, Balgownie is bordered by the light industrial and commercial suburb of Fairy Meadow.

The main street, Balgownie Road, connects the suburb to the nearby Princes Highway. Balgownie is mostly residential with a small commercial centre known as the Balgownie Village.

Balgownie has a similar history to many towns on the NSW south coast. When first settled in the 19th century, Balgownie was the centre of local logging, coal mining and farming industries. With the economic and population growth of the 20th century Balgownie was overtaken by the expanding urban sprawl and transformed from a small country hamlet to a residential suburb.

Balgownie is home to citizens right across the socioeconomic spectrum, from public housing estates in the east to multimillion-dollar mansions on the escarpment. Sites of interest include the Balgownie Public School's museum.

Over the last five years, the Australian property market has exploded and as a result many of the open spaces and paddocks that once greened the suburb have been turned into town house or "villa" developments.

The area features the oldest active soccer club in Australia, Balgownie Rangers, founded in 1883.
