= Fairy Meadow, New South Wales =

Fairy Meadow
- Suburb
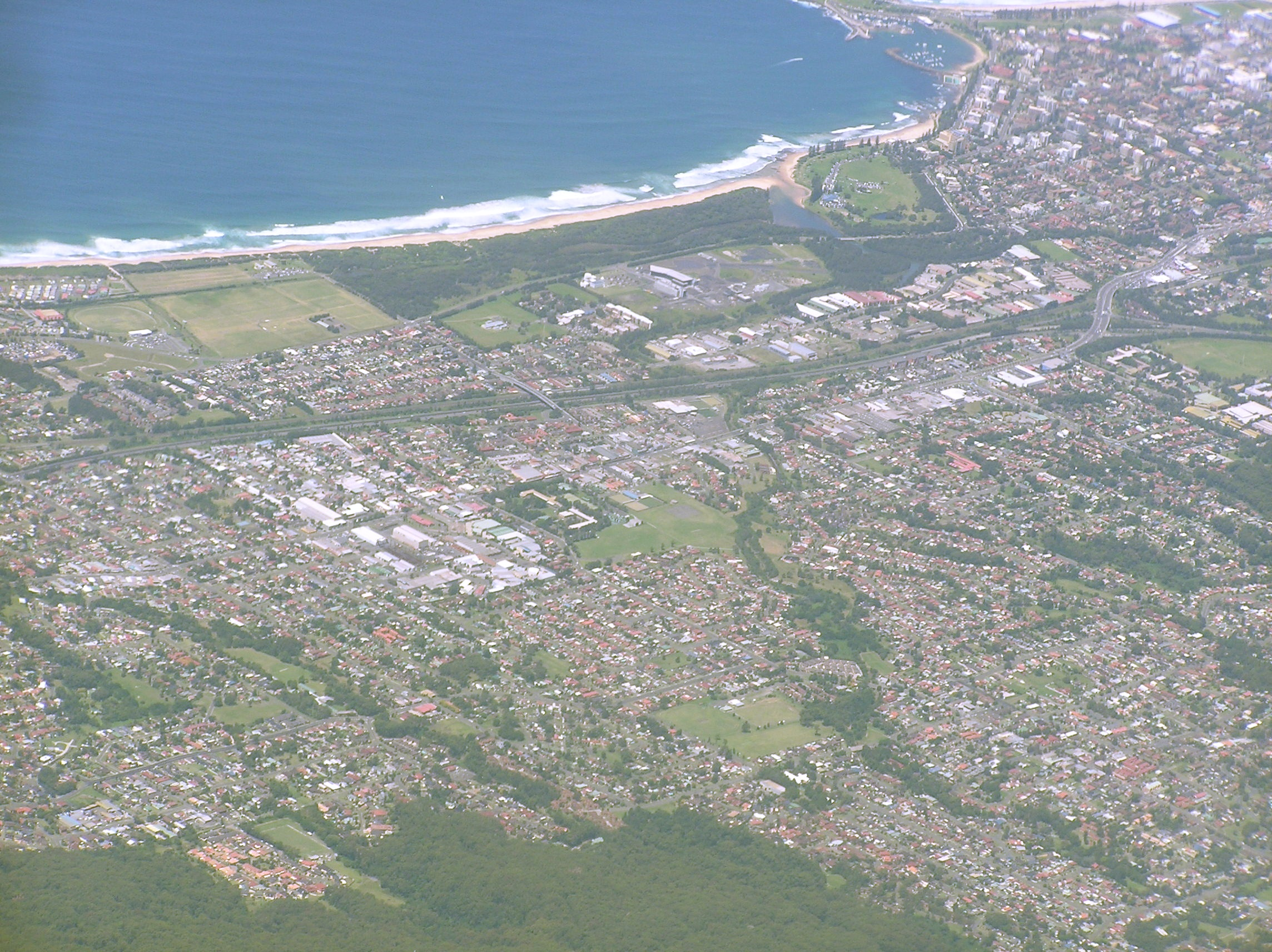
- Aerial photo

- Coordinates: 34.400570°S 150.891738°E
- Country: Australia
- State: New South Wales
- City: Wollongong
- LGA: City of Wollongong
- Location: 81 km (50 mi) from Sydney; 4 km (2.5 mi) from Wollongong

Government
  - State electorate: Wollongong
  - Federal division: Cunningham

Area
  - Total: 4.4 km^{2} (1.7 sq mi)
- Elevation: 12 m (39 ft)

Population
  - Total: 7,512 (2021 census)
  - Density: 1,707/km^{2} (4,420/sq mi)
- Postcode: 2519
Suburbs around Fairy Meadow
Fernhill	Towradgi
Balgownie	Fairy Meadow
Mount Ousley	North Wollongong

Aerial views of Fairy Meadow from a paraglider.

Fairy Meadow is a suburb in the City of Wollongong, New South Wales, Australia. Located in the Illawarra region and only 4 km from the city centre, it is a mainly low-density residential area, with a large strip of commercial and industrial properties along and off the Princes Highway.

== Overview ==
Fairy Meadow is popular with tourists and surfers, due to its long beach (Fairy Meadow Beach) and views of Mount Keira, and Mount Kembla. Fairy Meadow residents live mainly in older-style houses, though apartments are now being built along the aforementioned strip. The main shopping area includes Coles, Woolworths and Aldi supermarkets and many smaller stores and boutiques. Guest Park which is located to the west of the Princes Highway commercial strip has a skate park, tennis courts, netball courts and a large soccer pitch. A local historical building is the old Northern Illawarra Council Chambers.

To the southeast of Fairy Meadow in North Wollongong is Puckeys Estate Reserve, a bush reserve known for bird watching and coastal environment protection, open to the public for walking on the tracks, once the site of a saltworks. The area is also bordered by a long beach which stretches from Towradgi Point in the north, to Wollongong in the south, interrupted only by the rocks at the Fairy Lagoon entrance.

North of Puckey's Reserve and east of Fairy Meadow is Fairy Meadow Beach, the picnic facilities, playground and toilets in 2007 went under upgrades along with several other beachside areas in the Illawarra. The beach is patrolled in summer and has a surf life saving club, established in 1951.

West of Puckeys Reserve is Brandon Park, a greyhound racing track and the Wollongong Science Centre and Planetarium complex as well as an area of university property. The science centre is known for its laser concerts. The science centre was opened on 15 May 2000 by MP Colin Markham. The centre building is overtly white and clearly visible from Wollongong's higher points. Outside the entrance there stands a sculpture called 'Southern Cross', featuring poles in the shape of the constellation with graphics on them. The science and planetarium centre contains two levels, including a laser theatre, observatory, dinosaur and fossil exhibit, electronics exhibit and other attractions such as a setup demonstrating solar power with a model railroad and a forest logging simulation game

Fairy Meadow churches include the historic 1928 Anglican church Crossroads Christian Community, the more recent 1952 St John Vianney's Catholic Church, and the Reformed Church.

== Population ==
According to the 2021 census of Population, there were 7,512 people in Fairy Meadow.

- Aboriginal and Torres Strait Islander people made up 2.2% of the population.
- 68.6% of people were born in Australia. The next most common countries of birth were England 3.0%, India 2.5%, Italy 2.4%, Vietnam 1.7% and China 1.7%.
- 72.3% of people spoke only English at home. Other languages spoken at home included Italian 2.9%, Turkish 2.2%, Vietnamese 1.9%, Mandarin 1.7% and Arabic 1.4%.
- The most common responses for religion were No Religion 35.3%, Catholic 25.7% and Anglican 9.8%.

== Transportation ==
The area is served by Fairy Meadow railway station on the South Coast Line, which is part of the NSW TrainLink railway network. The station is accessed via steps which climb to the road bridge on Elliot's Road that runs from Puckeys Estate/Fairy Meadow Beach Surf Lifesaving Club to Princes Highway.

Fairy Meadow is also located along Wollongong's free shuttle bus to North Wollongong railway station, and Keiraville University of Wollongong campus. The free shuttle bus service that serves Fairy Meadow includes City of Wollongong bus routes 55A and 55C.

== Education ==
The suburb hosts two primary schools – Good Samaritan Catholic Primary and Fairy Meadow Demonstration School – as well as two high schools: Keira Technology High School and Wollongong High School of the Performing Arts. Other nearby primary schools include Mount Ousley Public School and Towradgi Public School.

Fairy Meadow is home to University of Wollongong's Innovation Campus – iC. The campus houses a large part of UOW's student population in the Campus East housing complex. The Innovation Campus is home to the university's faculty of science. Among the iC campus' many features is the aforementioned Science Centre and Planetarium.

A TAFE site is also located adjacent to Keira high school.

== Heritage listings ==
Fairy Meadow has a number of heritage-listed sites, including:

- Squires Way: Balgownie Migrant Workers Hostel

== Notable residents ==
- Birthplace of cricketer Dave Gregory, captain of the first Australian cricket test team
- Birthplace of Dr Mary Puckey, the first female superintendent of an Australian hospital
