= Cambewarra Range Nature Reserve =

Nature reserve in New South Wales, Australia

Cambewarra Range Nature Reserve Part of Yuin Nation
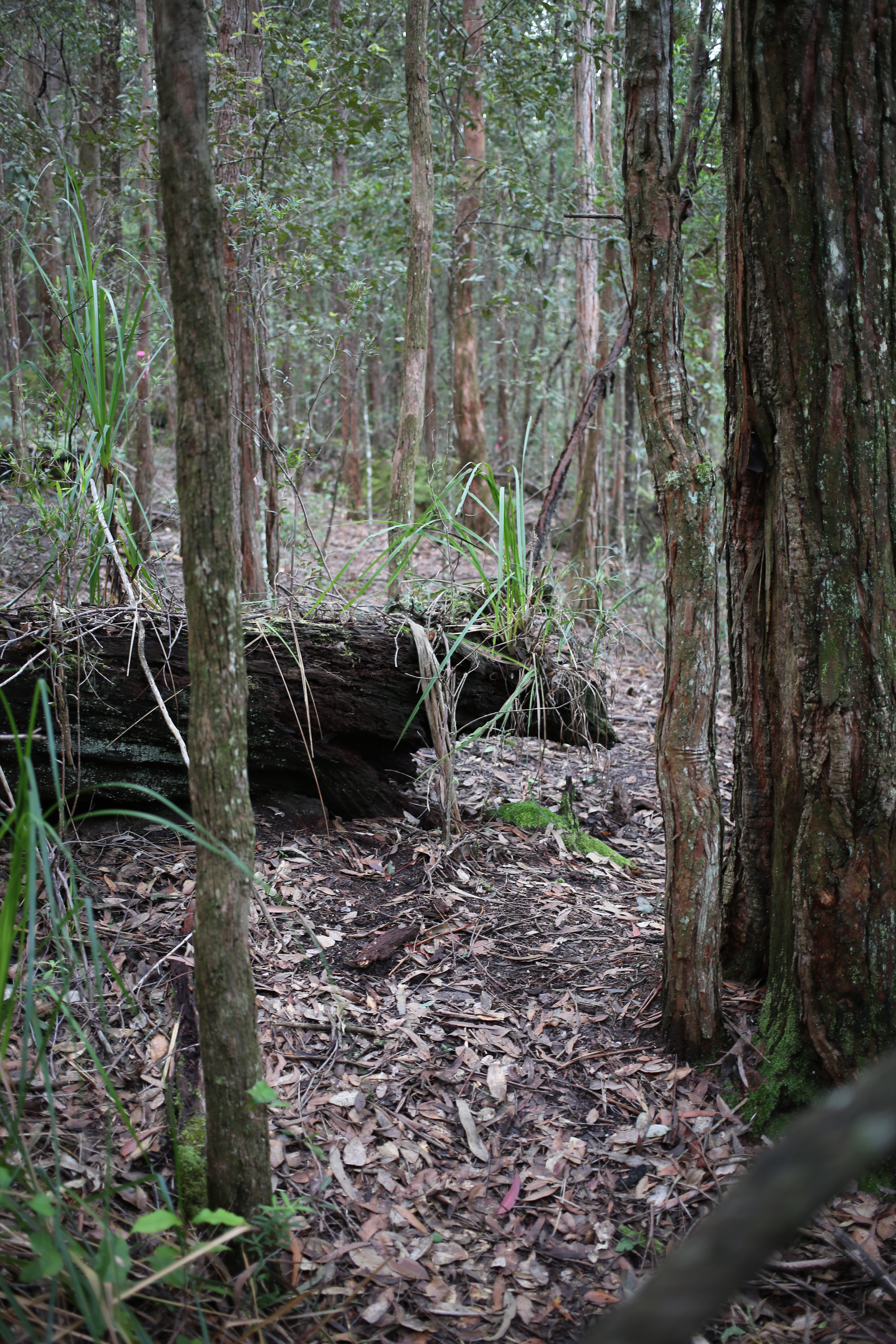
- Interactive map of Cambewarra Range Nature Reserve

Geography
- Location: Camden, South Coast of NSW, Australia
- Coordinates: 34°46′23″S 150°31′50″E
- Area: 1,400 ha (3,500 acres)

Administration
- Status: Nature Reserve
- Established: 2001
- Visitation: Open year round
- Authority: NSW National Parks and Wildlife Service
- Website: www.nationalparks.nsw.gov.au/visit-a-park/parks/Cambewarra-Range-Nature-Reserve

The Cambewarra Range Nature Reserve, as part of the Kangaroo Valley Group of Nature Reserves, is a protected area located on the cliffs and plateaus of the Kangaroo Valley in the Southern Highlands and South Coast regions of New South Wales in eastern Australia. The Reserve is situated approximately 150 kilometres (93 mi) south of Sydney, 50 kilometres (31 mi) southwest of Wollongong and 16 kilometres (9.9 mi) northwest of Nowra. The Reserve has a total area of 1684 hectares, and includes 11 privately owned properties. It is critical for it to be pristine for a variety of reasons, not the least the catchment of water, as the Reserve floor flows into the Kangaroo Valley River and the Shoalhaven River, from which the Sydney Water Authority draws water to supply large populations in Sydney and Wollongong.

Established in 2001, the Reserve is ecologically representative of the local Shoalhaven area, which is home to temperate rainforest and threatened species; such as the Brush-tailed rock-wallaby and the apex predator, the tiger quoll. It has a protective covenant placed on it, with the ultimate purpose to ensure the protection of the natural heritage of the area.

In 2003, Devils Glen, Red Rocks and Black Ash Nature Reserves were amalgamated into Cambewarra Range Nature Reserve. This is now a part of the Kangaroo Valley National Parks, consisting of the smaller refuges of Kangaroo River, Cambewarra Range, Barrengarry and Rodway Nature Reserves, which are covered by the Southern Regional Forest Agreement. The Illawarra-Shoalhaven subtropical rainforest occurs in the reserve.

Kangaroo valley is part of a system of conservation reserves, which includes Kangaroo River Nature Reserve and Barrengarry Nature Reserve. National parks in the area including the Morton National Park, Budderoo National Park and Barren Grounds Nature Reserve.

== Geology and soils ==
The Cambewarra Range Nature Reserve is located in the southern part of the Sydney Basin. The Sydney Basin is located on the central east coast of New South Wales, and it covers an area of 36240 km^{2}. The geological basin is filled with sandstones and shales from the Permian to Triassic periods that overlies older basement rocks of the Lachlan Fold Belt.

The southern part of the Sydney basin, the Permian deposits, are subdivided into two major units, the Shoalhaven Group and the Illawarra Coal Measures. The Shoalhaven Group consists of a thick succession of fine to medium-grained clastics passing upwards into a number of lava flows and interspersed volcanic flows, forced into the sandstones and originating from the Gerringong Volcanics. The Cambewarra Latite, which comprises highly feldspathic and sparsely porphyritic lava. It has the highest elevation of the group, situated in the Cambewarra Mountain region. The Illawarra Coal Measures originated from a fluvial environment; they have recognizable marine strata. The group is made up of lithic sandstones, siltstones, shales, and coal seams.

Above the Permian deposits overlie Triassic sediments, which are of fluvial origin. The Triassic deposits are subdivided into three major units: the Narrabeen Group, the Hawkesbury Sandstone and the Wianamatta shale. These groups are made up of volcanic rocks and lithic sandstones, with occasional dark coloured shales, but there is no presence of coal found in these groups. Also, soils of the Cambewarra Range Nature Reserve have good water holding capacity and are fertile.

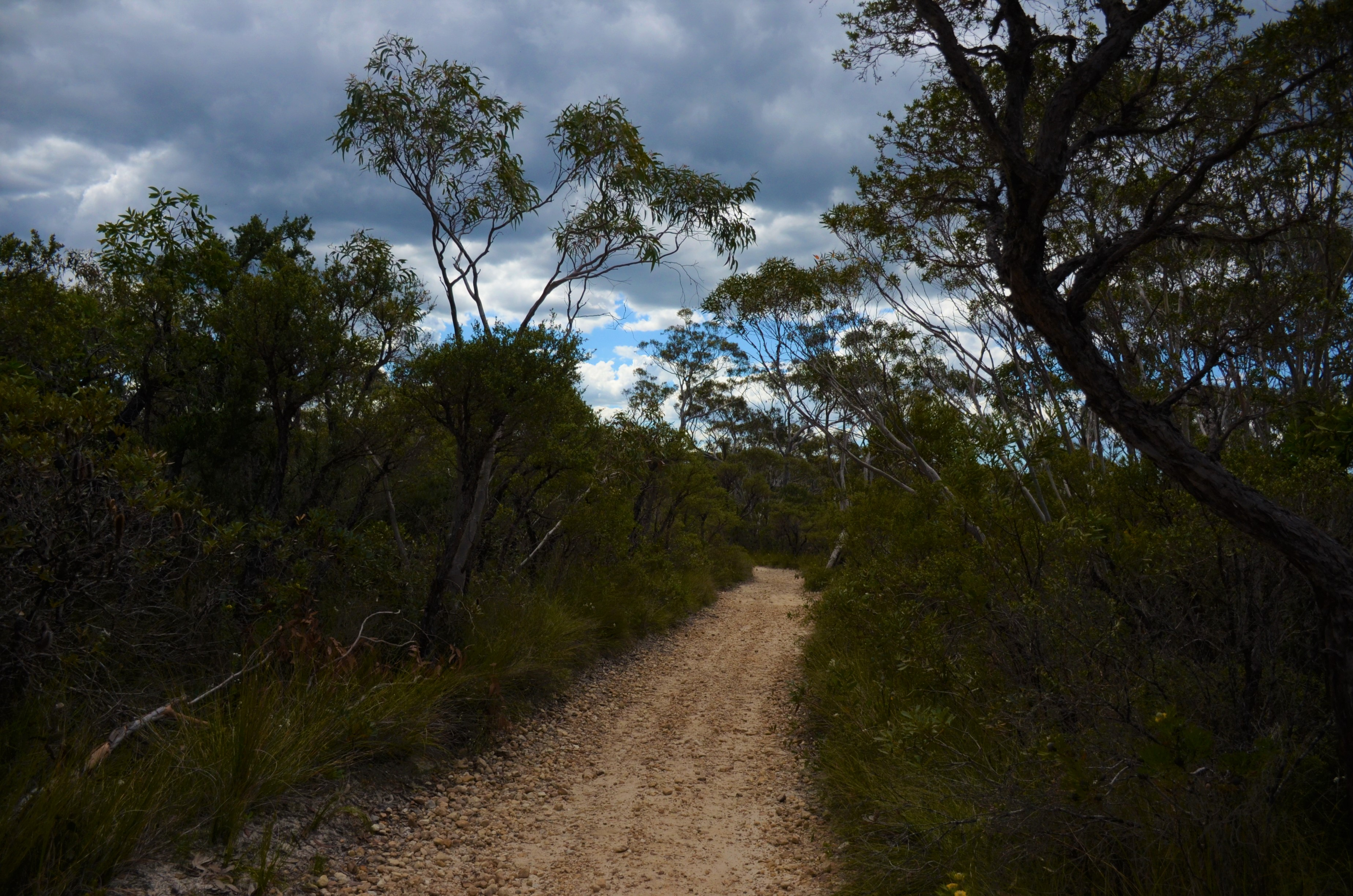
Soil and plants

== Climate ==
The average annual rainfall is above the 1200 mm level that applies around the South Coast. Snowfalls are common above than 1000 m on the Central and Southern tablelands through winter, and even as late as November in unusual falls. The mean yearly temperature remains nearly 16 °C along the Coastal plains. Occasional heat waves occur when the conditions like temperature inversions apply, especially in Kangaroo Valley, which acts as a basin, trapping air with inversion layers. The southern region coastal section around Kiama shows the highest rainfall in summer, whereas the western region has more rain in winter. The climate of the coastal region remains calmer and warmer than high rainfall in Kangaroo Valley. Prevailing winds during summer come from the north-east onshore, whereas winds come from the west and south-west throughout the winter season, particularly in July and August (the 'westerlies'). North Westerly winds occasionally arise in November, bringing dangerous bushfire conditions. The Coastal face of the region is colder in summer and less vulnerable to mist during winter than Kangaroo Valley, which is enshrouded in mist each morning until the sun lifts the mist layer. The South facing cliffs and plateaus of many sites receive scant sunshine and so are damp and cold in winter.

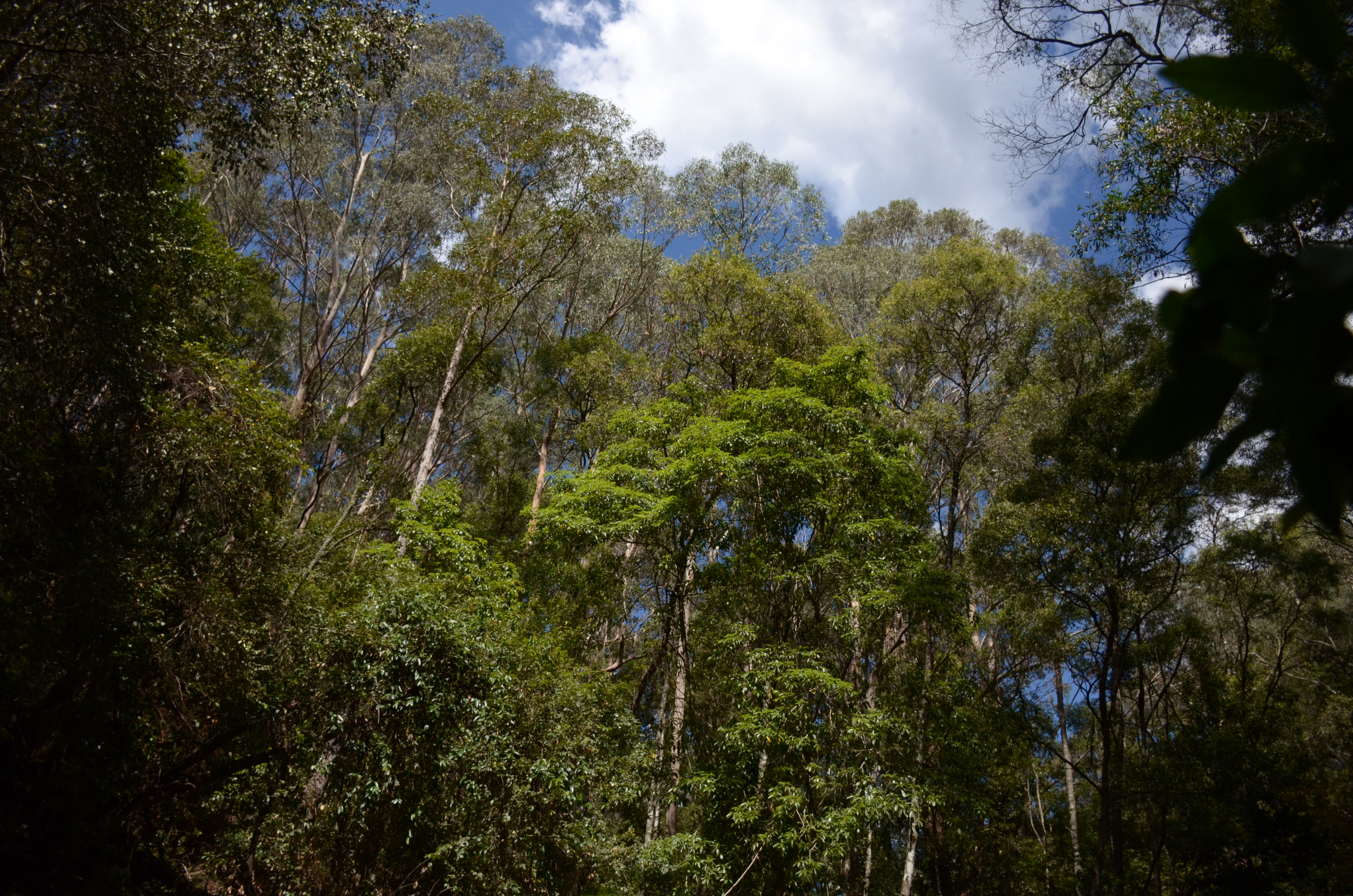
Sunshine

== Rivers and water quality ==
There are numerous small creeks, such as Nugents Creek and O’Hares Creek, flowing through Cambewarra Range Nature Reserve, which eventually flow into the Kangaroo River and Shoalhaven River and onto Lake Yarrunga that is created by Tallowa Dam. The Berry Mountain Section of Cambewarra Range Nature Reserve has private dams that provide water to nearby residences. The high rainfall brings fast filling of dams, which from the air or satellite imaging, can be seen dotted throughout the region. The Kangaroo River Sub-catchment is part of the drinking water catchment for Sydney, Illawarra and Shoalhaven Regions.

A water quality survey of benthic macroinvertebrates in Nugent's Creek and O’Hares Creeks conducted by students from the University of Wollongong in April 2016 revealed the presence of Mayfly, Stonefly, Caddisfly and Dragonfly larvae. The largest number of larvae found, were that of the mayfly and stonefly; these two species are sensitive to pollution and are therefore only found in areas where water is of high to good quality i.e. free of pollution.

During the summer, some parts of the river in Cambewarra dry or the water becomes black. 'Black' water is water with little or no oxygen in it. This water is dark in colour due to the destruction of plants and other organic matter so as to have high dissolved organic carbon from decomposing vegetation.

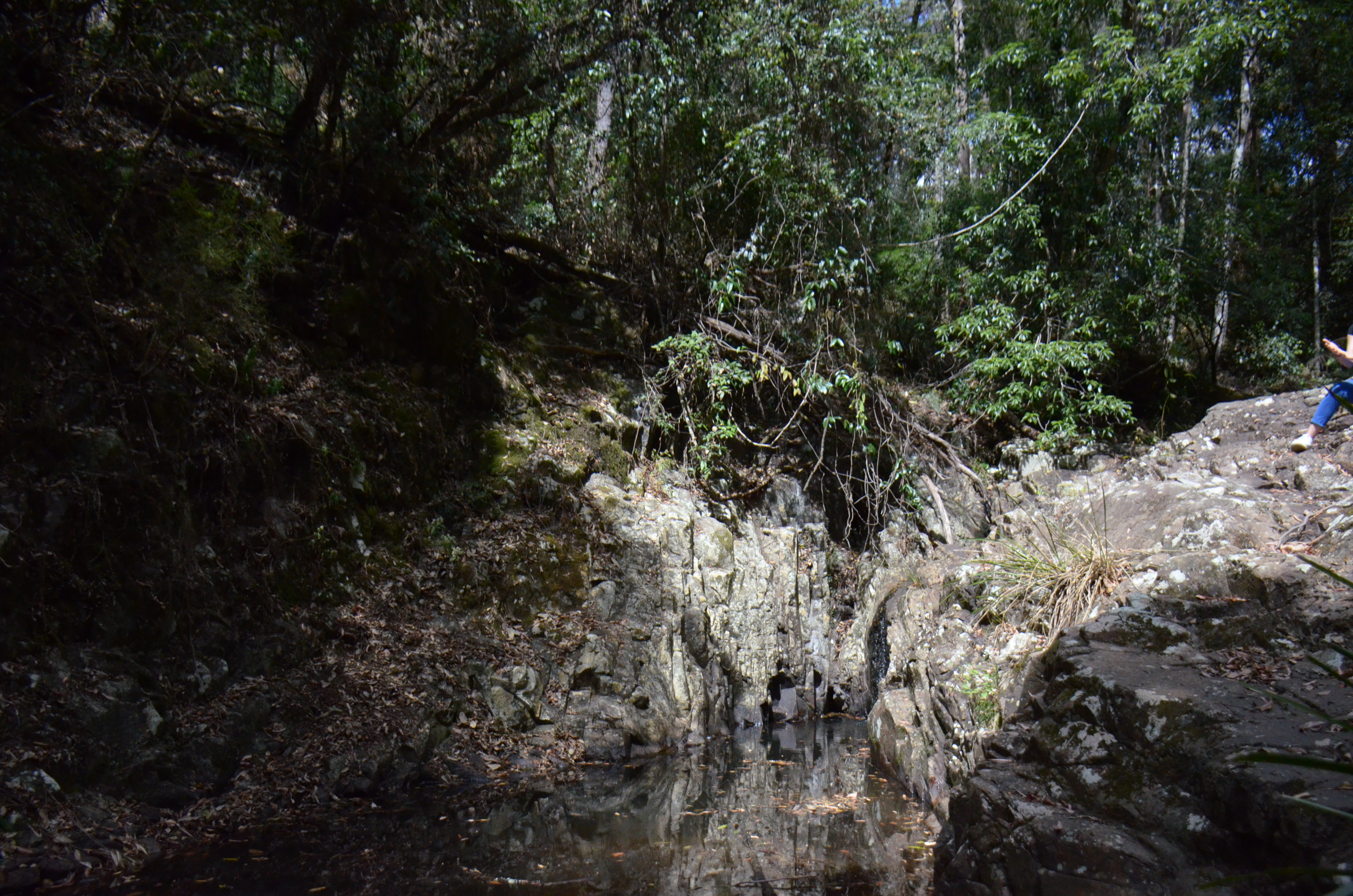
Nugents Creek in the middle of Cambewarra Range Nature Reserve

== History ==
The range was first in use in the 1800s for red cedar cutting. Mr Richard Brooks, who was a soldier-settler in the Kangaroo Valley, held the first licence to cut red cedar in the area in 1836; it is said that cedar was cut from the many arms of the Kangaroo Valley, with the Cambewarra Range likely to have been one such arm. Logging, burning and trampling of the soils continued with farming and stock. The land was cleared in 1861 with increasing settlements. Around the 1960s, it was partially used for gravel extraction. Today, the area is not under economic use anymore.

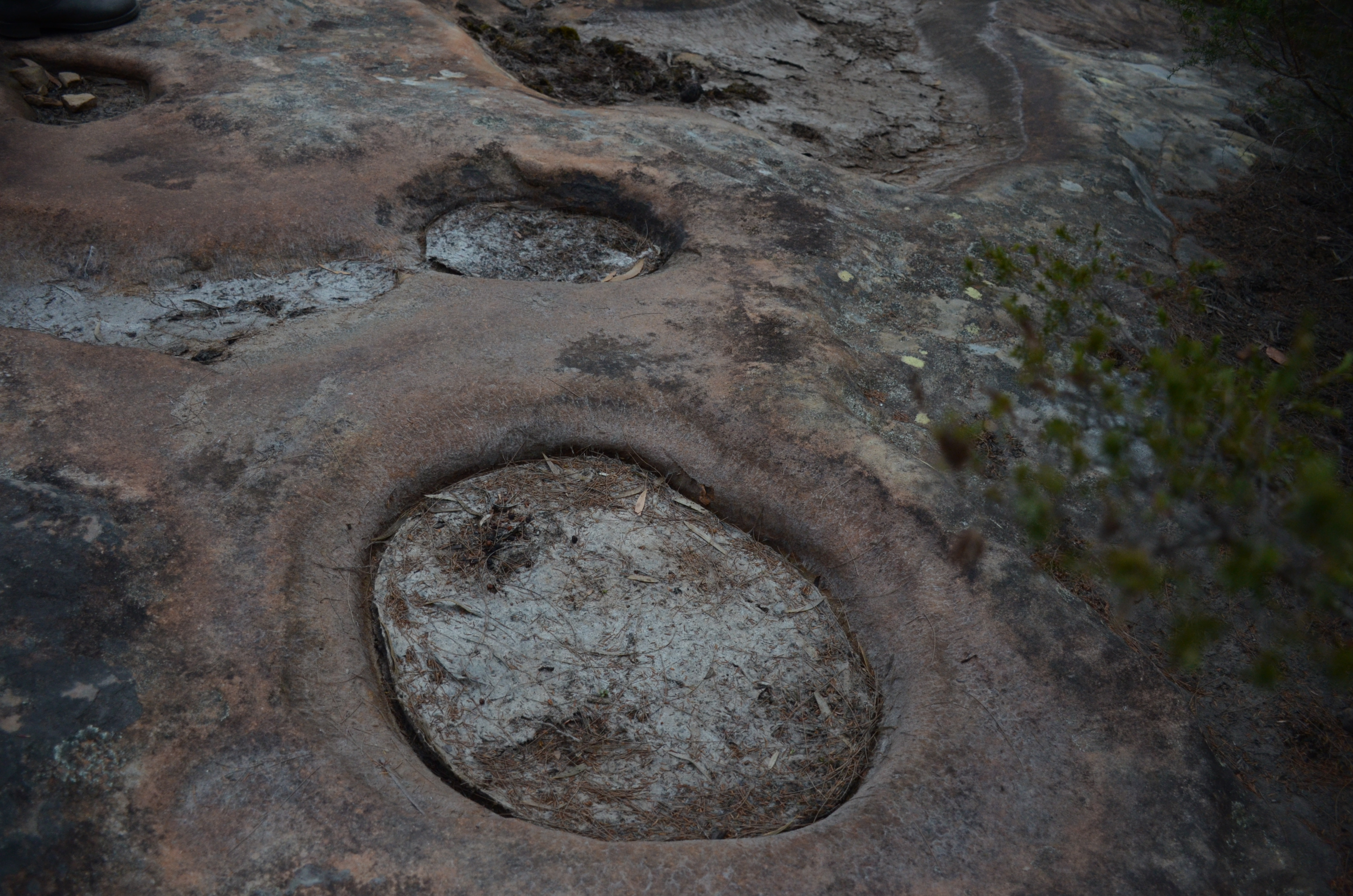
Aboriginal trails

The Tharawal (Dharawal) people, traditional custodians, gave the name of the area as Cambewarra. They dwelled as groups in coastal areas, now known as Sydney basin, where they relied on hunting and fishing. They hunted different Possums, Wallabies and Goannas, along with their eggs. Many berries and leafy foods are present in the Reserve, used for food and medicine. Modern covered drain, previously known as creeks, were the main source of fresh water for them.

The term 'Cambewarra' means 'mountain of fire'. So, these aboriginal people named the mountain, Cambewarra, because it was believed that volcano eruption once took place in the mountain. Another logic behind the name, Cambewarra, is that the apex of the mountain is mostly covered by the cloud which appears as the smoke coming from the top of the mountain.

== Habitat ==
Cambewarra Range Nature Reserve has mixed habitats but is dominated by coastal hinterland subtropical warm temperate rainforest consisting mainly of coachwood (Ceratopetalum apetulum) which occurs in protected slopes and gullies. The Red Rocks plateau (formerly known as Red rocks Nature Reserve) and Black Ash segment (Bellawongarah Mountain) of the reserve is also covered in parts by the lowland dry shrub forest, northern coast and hinterland moist heath shrubland. There are small areas of upland swamp on Bellawongarah Mountain and at the western end of the Red Rocks section. The Red Rocks Plateau in small areas also include Northern Coastal Hinterland Heath Shrub Dry Forest and a survey conducted in the area found seven forest communities categorized as: coachwood rainforest, Open heathland, Brown barrel (E. fastigata)/Sydney blue gum tall open forest, Silvertop ash woodland, Heathland sedge land, Sydney peppermint open forest and Open woodland-heathland. The Berry Mountain section of the reserve comprises three types of rainforest: mixed subtropical/warm temperate rainforest, warm temperate rainforest and dry rainforest. The reserve is providing suitable habitat for a large number of threatened animal species and regionally rare plant species.

== Flora ==
The Cambewarra Range Nature Reserve, a large portion of which is old growth forest, most commonly comprises coachwood (Ceratopetalum apetalum), Lilly pilly (Syzgium smithii), native laurel (Cryptocarya glaucescens) and sassafras (Doryphora sassafras).Lowland Dry Shrub Forest is found on the plateau tops and upper slopes in Rodway Nature Reserve and in the Red Rocks and Black Ash sections of Cambewarra Range Nature Reserve. Other common trees showing dominance in this region includes red bloodwood (Corymbia gummifera), the scribbly gum (Eucalyptus sclerophylla), brown barrel (E. fastigata), Sydney peppermint (E. piperita), silver quandong, brown beech (Pennantia cunninghamii), soapy box (Citronella moorei), and giant stinging tree (Dendrocnide excelsa).Small patches of Southern Escarpment Shrub/Fern/Herb Moist Forest also occur in these areas, dominated by brown barrel E. fastigata, whitetopped box E. quadrangulata and river peppermint E. elata. Two endangered plant species Solanum celatum and Cryptostylis hunteriana (vulnerable orchid) were also recorded in the Cambewarra Range Nature Reserve. The tall shrubland dominated by Melaleuca linariifolia, together with Leptospermum polygalifolium and Leptomeria acida on plateau tops of Black ash and Red Rocks sections shows significance due to restricted distribution. The Berry Mountain section of Cambewarra Range Nature Reserve showed three separate groupings: firstly, mixed subtropical/warm temperate rainforest on boulder and scree slope, with silver quandong Elaeocarpus kirtonii, maidens blush Sloanea australis and brush cherry Syzygium australe on deeper soil secondly, warm temperate rainforest of coachwood, crabapple Schizomeria ovata, sassafras, jackwood Cryptocarya glaucescens, bolly gum Litsea reticulata and lilly pilly on shallower soils and lastly, dry rainforest of whalebone tree Streblus brunonianus, deciduous fig Ficus henneana, red olive-berry Elaeodendron australe, grey myrtle Backhousia myrtifolia and water gum Tristaniopsis laurina on shallowest soils subject to water stress. In addition to trees, various types of beautiful flowers can be found in this region such as Sonchus asper (L.) Hill and Callistemon citrinus. The study stated that the Cambewarra Mountain area has one of the largest areas of subtropical rainforest remaining in the Illawarra-Shoalhaven. Much of the vegetation is old growth or mature forest but significant areas have been disturbed and there are small areas of regrowth. The disturbances are a result of fires and selective logging in parts of Cambewarra Range Nature Reserve in the early 1900s.

Two threatened plant species have been recorded in Cambewarra Range Nature Reserve. The endangered Solanum celatum was observed on Cambewarra Mountain early in the 20th century but it is not known if it still occurs there. The vulnerable orchid Cryptostylis hunteriana is found on the Red Rocks plateau.

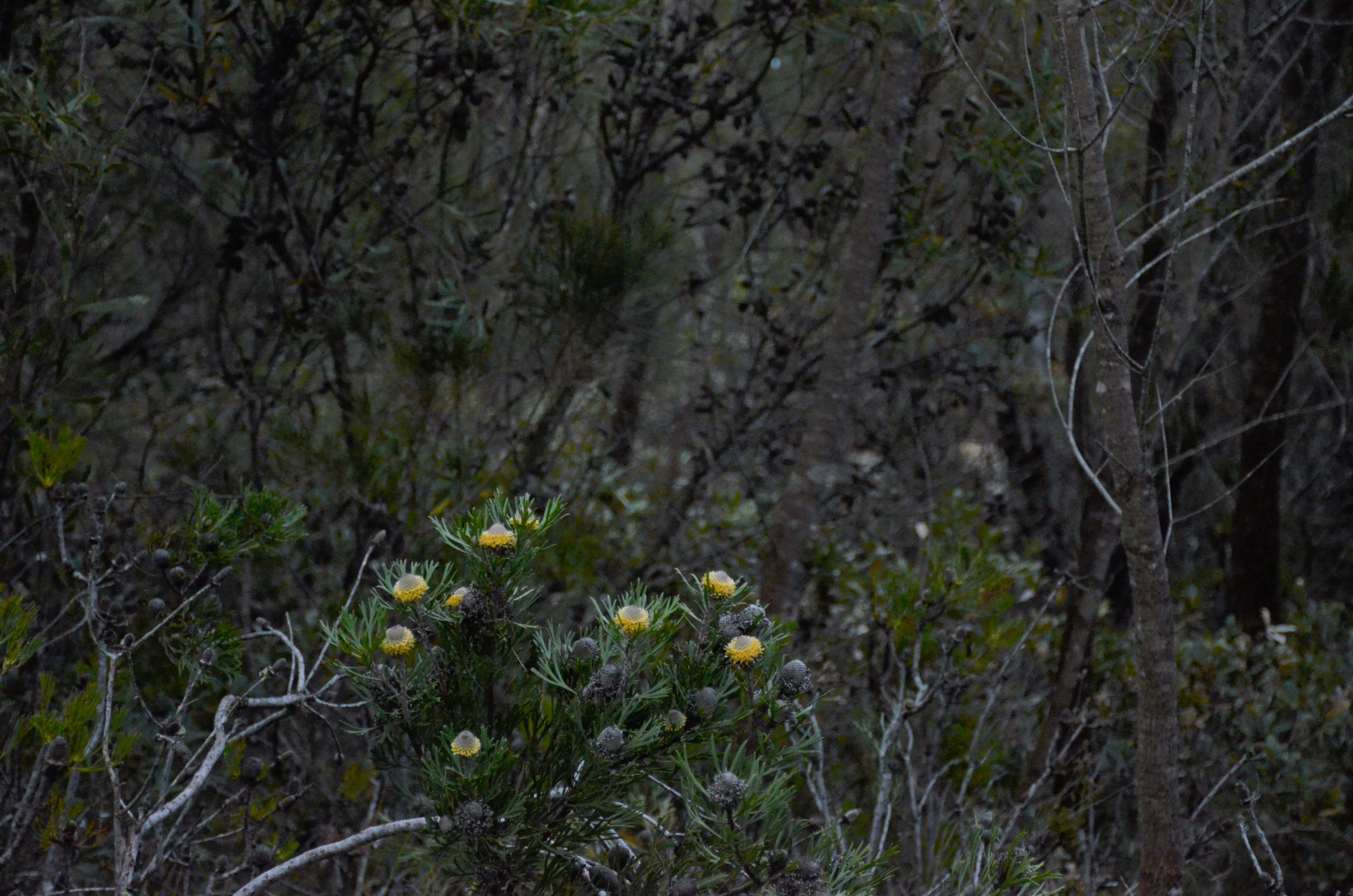
Sonchus asper (L.) Hill

== Fauna ==
Cambewarra Range Nature Reserve provides suitable habitat for diverse species of animals as it has a combination of different types of habitat; the diversity is particularly high in the case of birds and herpetofauna. Fauna surveys conducted in the area has revealed a total of 61 species in the Red Rocks section of the Reserve. Several endangered native animal species are found in Camberwarra Range Nature Reserve which includes eastern bristlebird (Dasyornis brachypterus), brush-tailed rock-wallaby (Petrogale penicillata), sooty owl (Tyto tenebricosa), powerful owl (Ninox strenua), giant burrowing frog (Heleioporus australiacus), olive whistler (Pachycephala olivacea), spotted-tail quoll (Dasyurus maculatus), eastern bent-wing bat (Miniopterus schreibersii), yellow-bellied glider (Petaurus australis) and long-nosed potoroo (Potorous tridactylus). Rock-wallaby numbers are declining and there is current only one known rock-wallaby colony remaining in the reserves – in the western part of Cambewarra Range Nature Reserve. Also, faunal surveys (using remote cameras and hair funnel traps) conducted by citizen scientists (staff and students from the University of Wollongong) since 2014 have revealed the following common native species in abundance: swamp wallaby (Wallabia bicolor), bush rat (Rattus fuscipes), Eastern swamp rat (Rattus lutreolus), brown antechinus (Antechinus stuartii), ringtail possum (Pseudocheirus peregrinus), squirrel glider (Petaurus norfolcensis), and sugar glider (Petaurus breviceps).

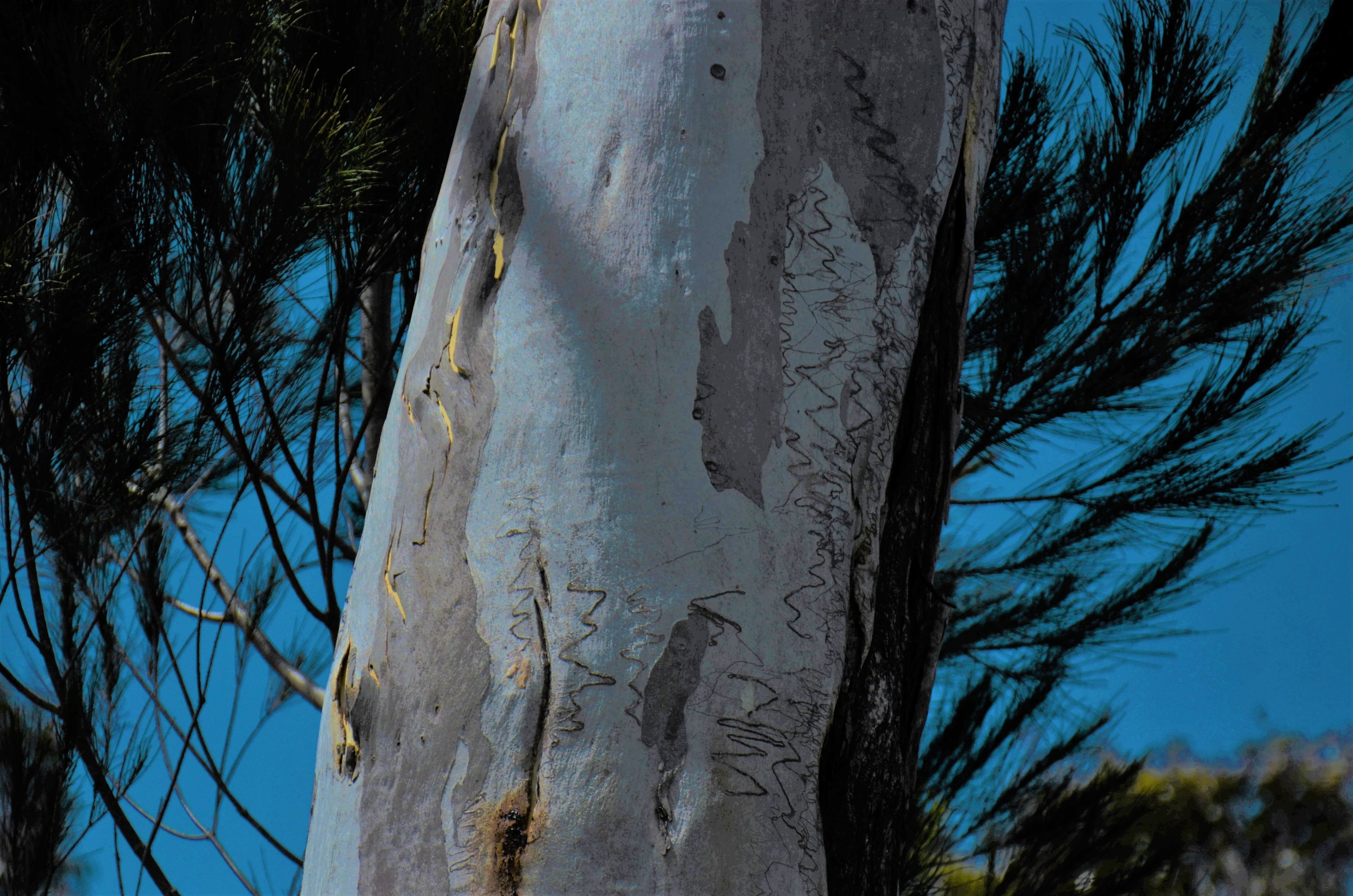
Traces of insects

== Human impacts ==
Cambewarra Range Nature Reserve is larger in area compared to other nature reserves in the same region and it is surrounded by private land. With this urbanization, native faunal and floral diversity has more trends to be influenced by humans. For example, clearing and incursion weed, agricultural pest control and introduced predators such as cats and foxes may affect the fauna and flora in the nature reserve. Lantana is a most common incursion weed type in wet forest margins of Cambewarra Range Nature Reserve. The native species of Brush-tailed rock-wallaby is threatened by foxes, but the fox control has been undertaken within the reserve. Cambewarra Range Nature Reserve has water catchment areas. There are creeks that flow in to Kangaroo river and hence to Lake Yarrunga (Tallowa Dam). That is a part of Shoalhaven Scheme. The dam supplies water for the residences around Cambewarra Range Nature Reserve. Although the nature reserve is known to have limited access and few facilities for public, it already has facilities for walking, bird watching, scenery viewing, horse riding (only on public roads within reserve) and educational use like research. A vehicle park and also publicly available vehicle access are available within the reserve. Leobold Hill road and Red Rocks Trig Trail are the roads across the reserve’s plateau which makes available the access through to the end of the cliff line. It makes significant damage to the trail where it crosses a poorly drained area. This happens especially in wet weather.

== Research and management ==
Cambewarra Range Nature Reserve has recently attracted attention from students and citizen scientists from the University of Wollongong. These student biologists conduct regular fieldwork and ecological research in the reserve to monitor habitat structure and biodiversity. Due to its high conservation values and the reserve holding some threatened species, it is critical to monitor the species population levels, as animals like foxes are capable of disrupting whole populations of native animals like the Rock Wallaby.

Sections of the Reserve were identified for suitability in long term ecological research (see LTER: Long Term Ecological Research Network), and since 2014 areas in the Reserve have been surveyed for its fauna, using various techniques, such as remote cameras and hair funnel traps. These were placed and retrieved for data by scientists and students from University of Wollongong. Twice a year (since 2014) the data is collected and some of it is represented in the gallery of fauna found on this page.

The legislation and policies for the management of nature reserves in NSW come under National Parks and Wildlife Act 1974 (NPW Act), the NPW Regulation, the Threatened Species Conservation Act 1995 (TSC Act), Environmental Planning and Assessment Act 1979 (EPA Act), and the policies of the National Parks and Wildlife Service (NPWS).

This area contains the Endangered Ecological Community known as the Illawarra Subtropical Rainforest (in the Sydney Basin Bioregion); see Schedule 2, Biodiversity Conservation Act 2016 no 63. The Illawarra Subtropical Rainforest is one of ten priority management sites which have been identified by the NSW Government Office of Environment and Heritage. Site 10: is the Cambewarra Range Nature Reserve. This site incorporates the slopes to the north of Cambewarra, including Cambewarra Range Nature Reserve, up to Tourist Road and extending east towards Jaspers Brush. The total site area is 1,322 (ha)

The developmental control of this Reserve is effectively exercised by the director of the National Parks and Wildlife Service (NSW). Cambewarra Range Nature Reserve management objectives are to protect and conserve the biodiversity, the geological features and the cultural values of landscapes. There is a rural-residential pressure on this area, as the landscape of Cambewarra Range consists of bushland, agricultural and urban elements. The pressure on the habitat, particularly on the quoll, is undergoing a slow but inevitable transformation towards a higher proportion of cleared land for residential and farm buildings, with gardens, grazing paddocks, and bushfire reduction areas through clearing around buildings. Although not as extensive as it once was, there is still some clearing for defined agricultural use, rather than the lifestyle, accommodation clearing that predominates throughout the region. Other land management issues include encroachment and introduction of weeds, invasion by feral cats, foxes and other introduced animals. There is a degree of difficulty in achieving effective fire protection, in avoiding disturbance from trail bikes and quads, and there can be pollution of streams (spillage, fertiliser runoff) and illegal forest clearing for timber that is sold for furniture manufacture, housing, fencing and boutique firewood use, like the special aromas coming from certain wood-fired ovens.

Given that the native carnivore, the spotted-tail quoll, has been sighted in the Reserve, as the native apex predator or apex carnivore, this species deserves special mention. It is now widely regarded that key objectives of many programmes, which seek to maintain ecosystem function, should include strategies to conserve such carnivores. The study by Glen and Dickman (2008) found that quolls foraged mainly in forested habitat, while introduced carnivores foraged mainly in cleared habitat. This study, although conducted in north-eastern NSW, is still applicable to the Cambewarra area. The study indicated there was a strong potential for competition between quolls and the non-native carnivores, like the fox and feline cat. Thus, continued monitoring, and where applicable, the eradication of pest species such as foxes, cats and dogs, including the use of poison ground baits, is recommended. The study also highlights the relationships between clearing of native habitat and the spread of introduced species

== Gallery ==
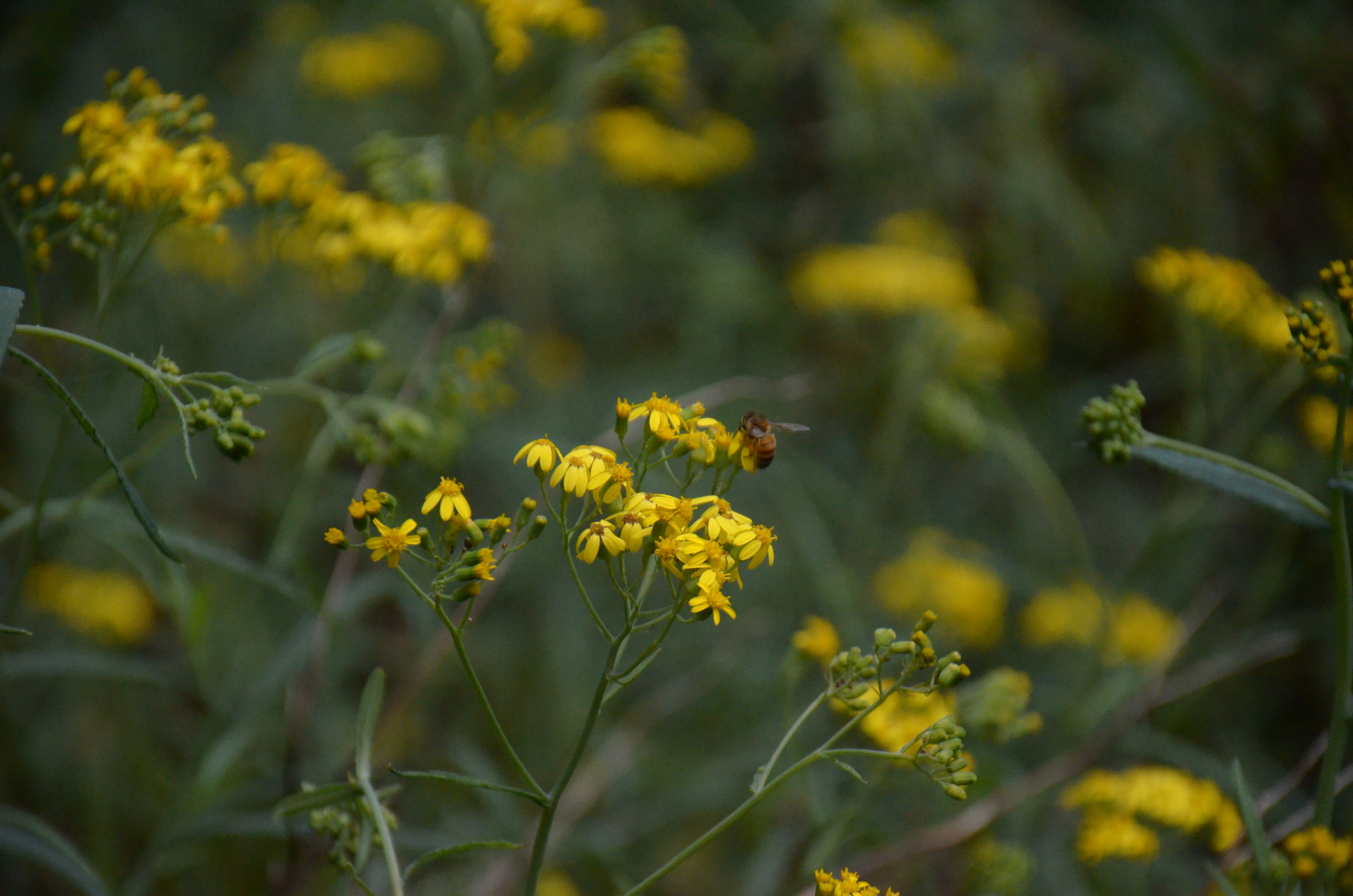
Callistemon citrinus

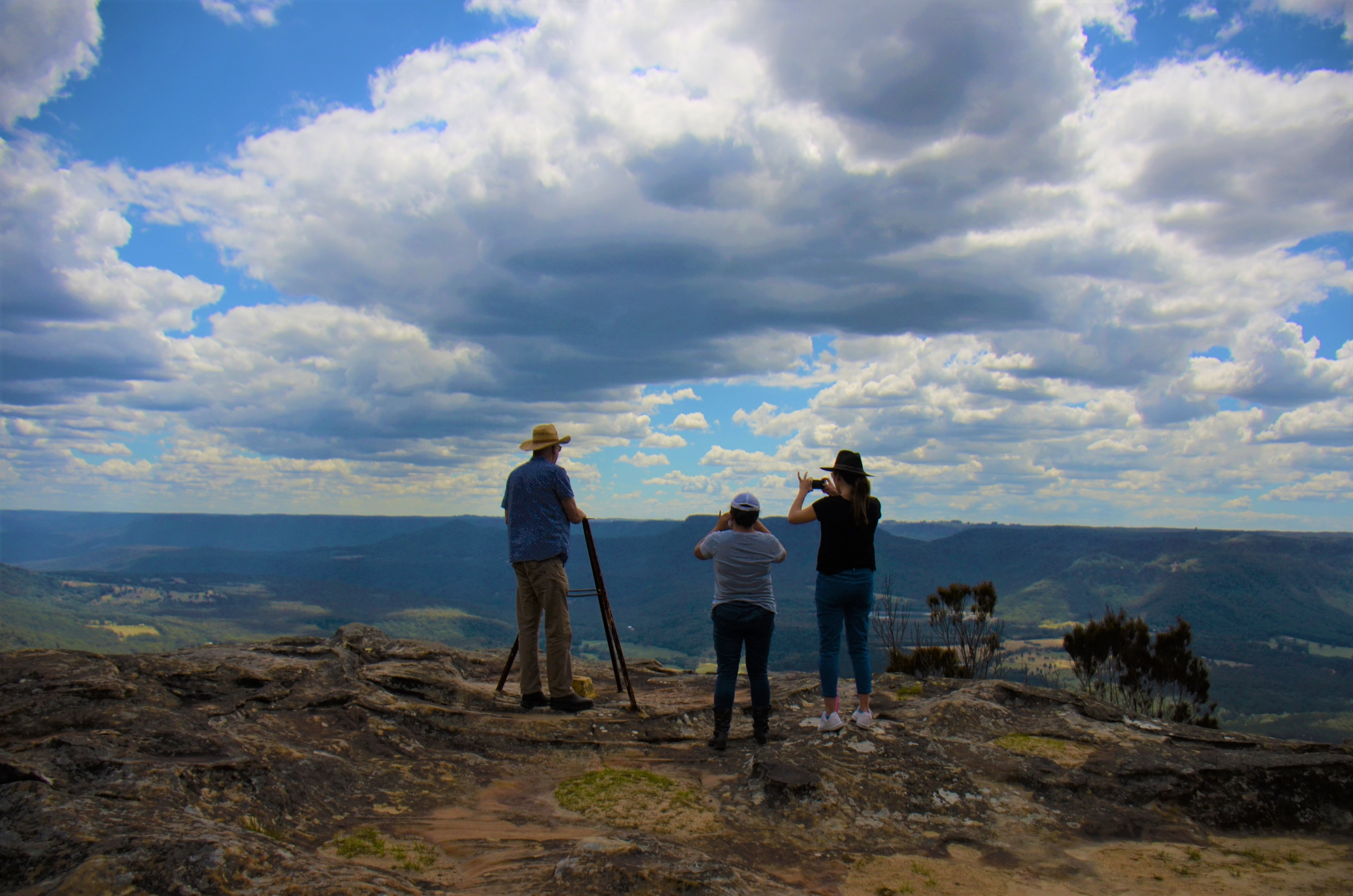
Cambewerra Nature Reserve Discovery

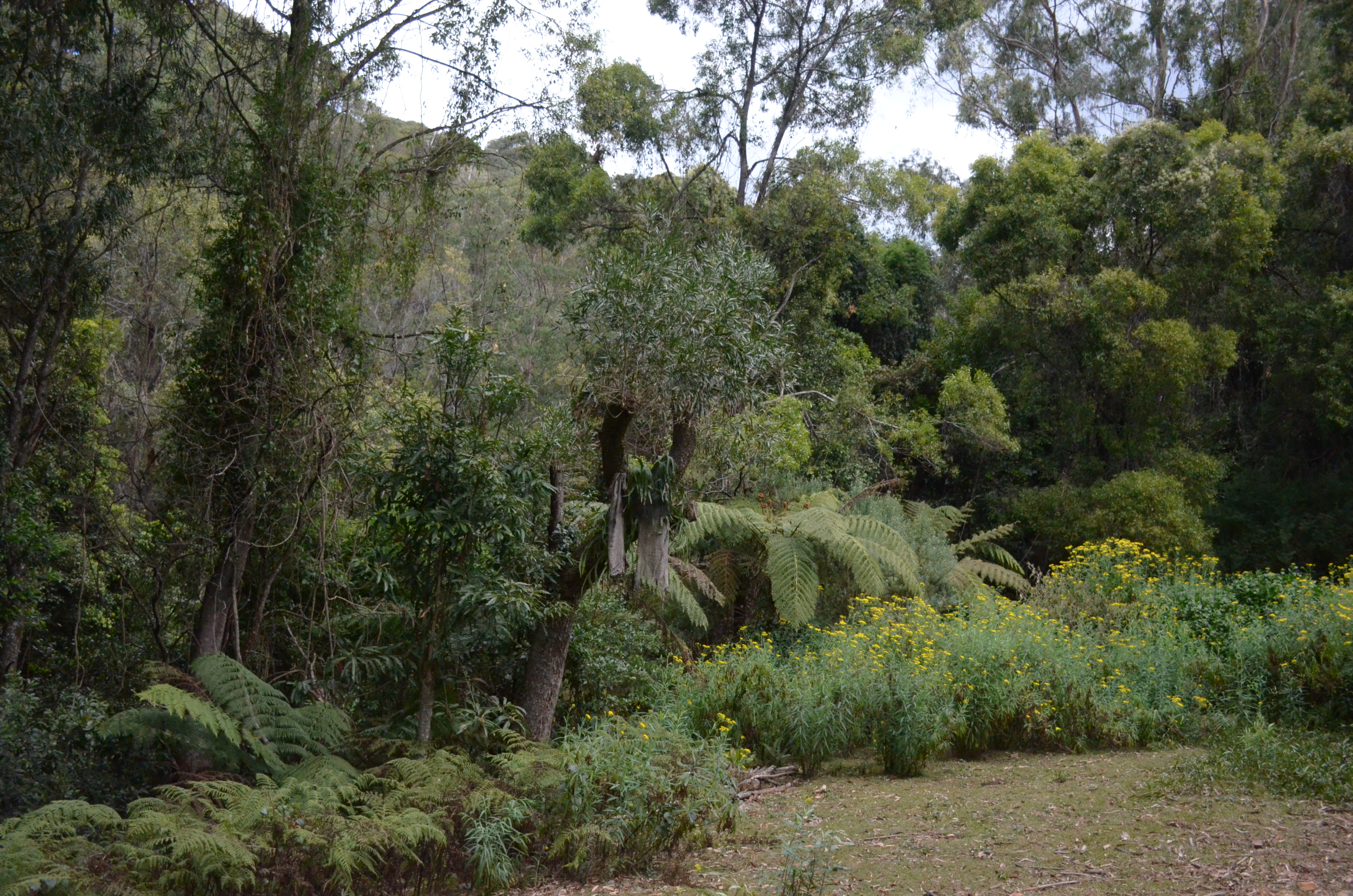
Field trip

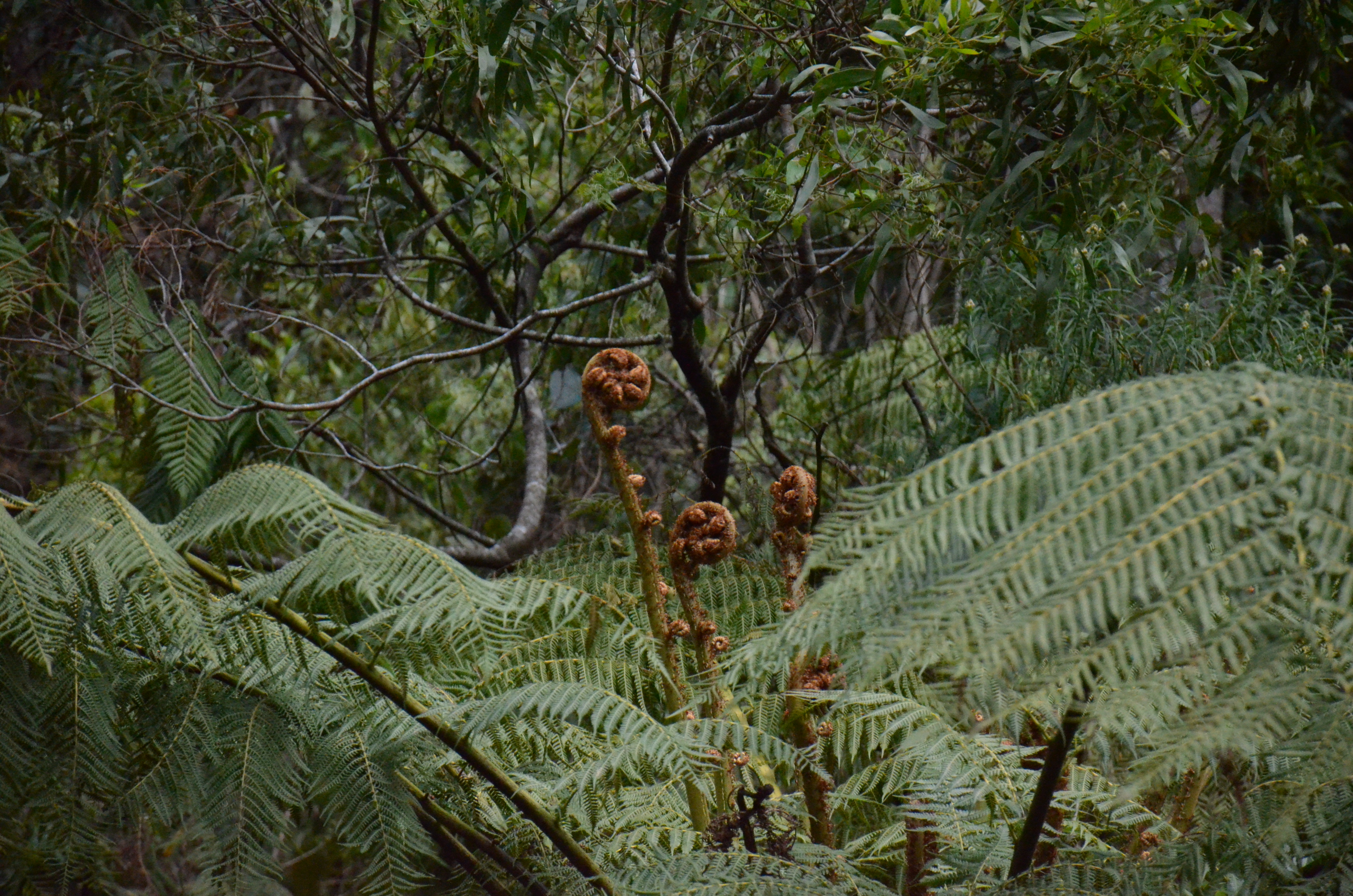
Plants

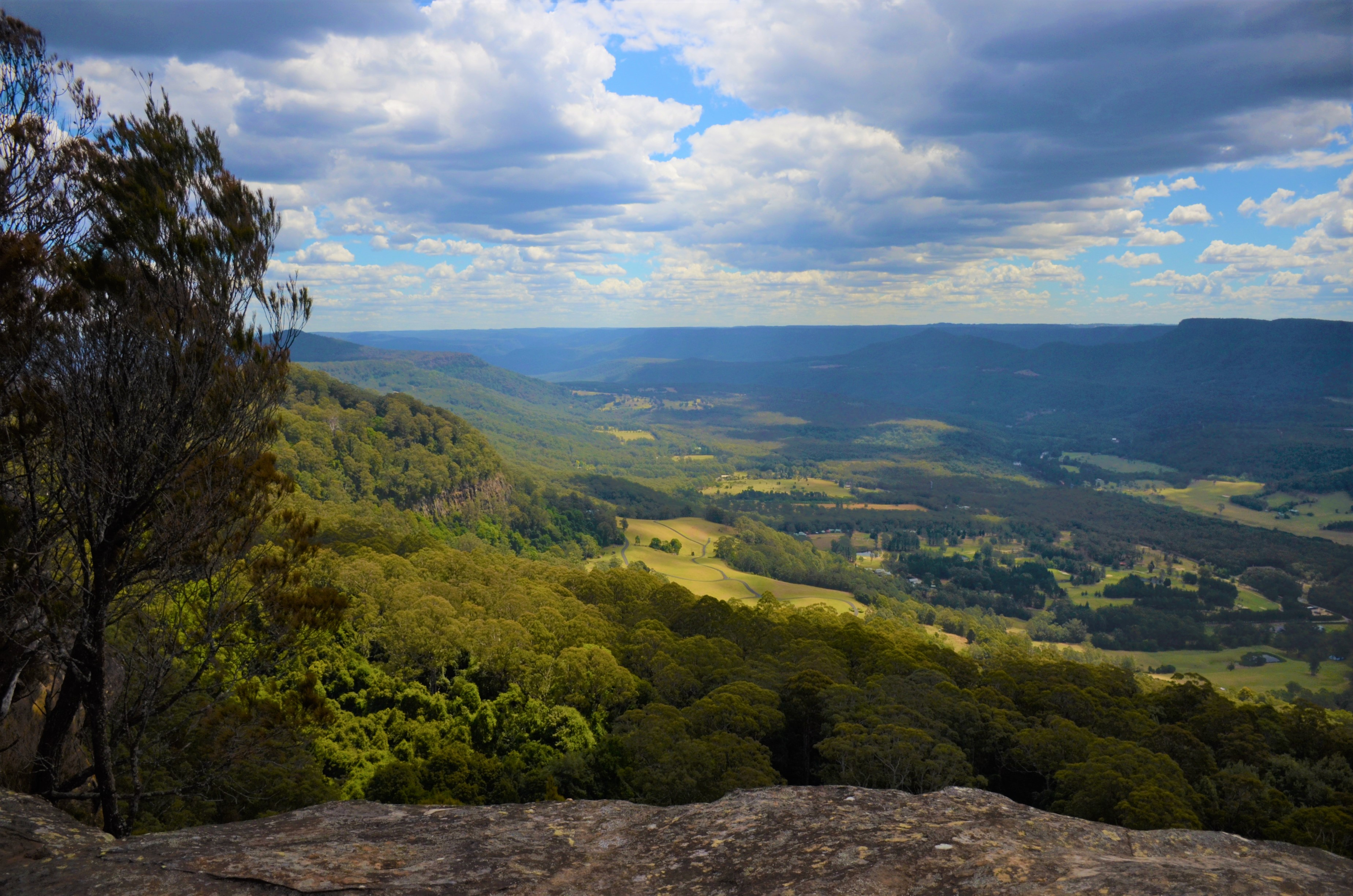
Landscape

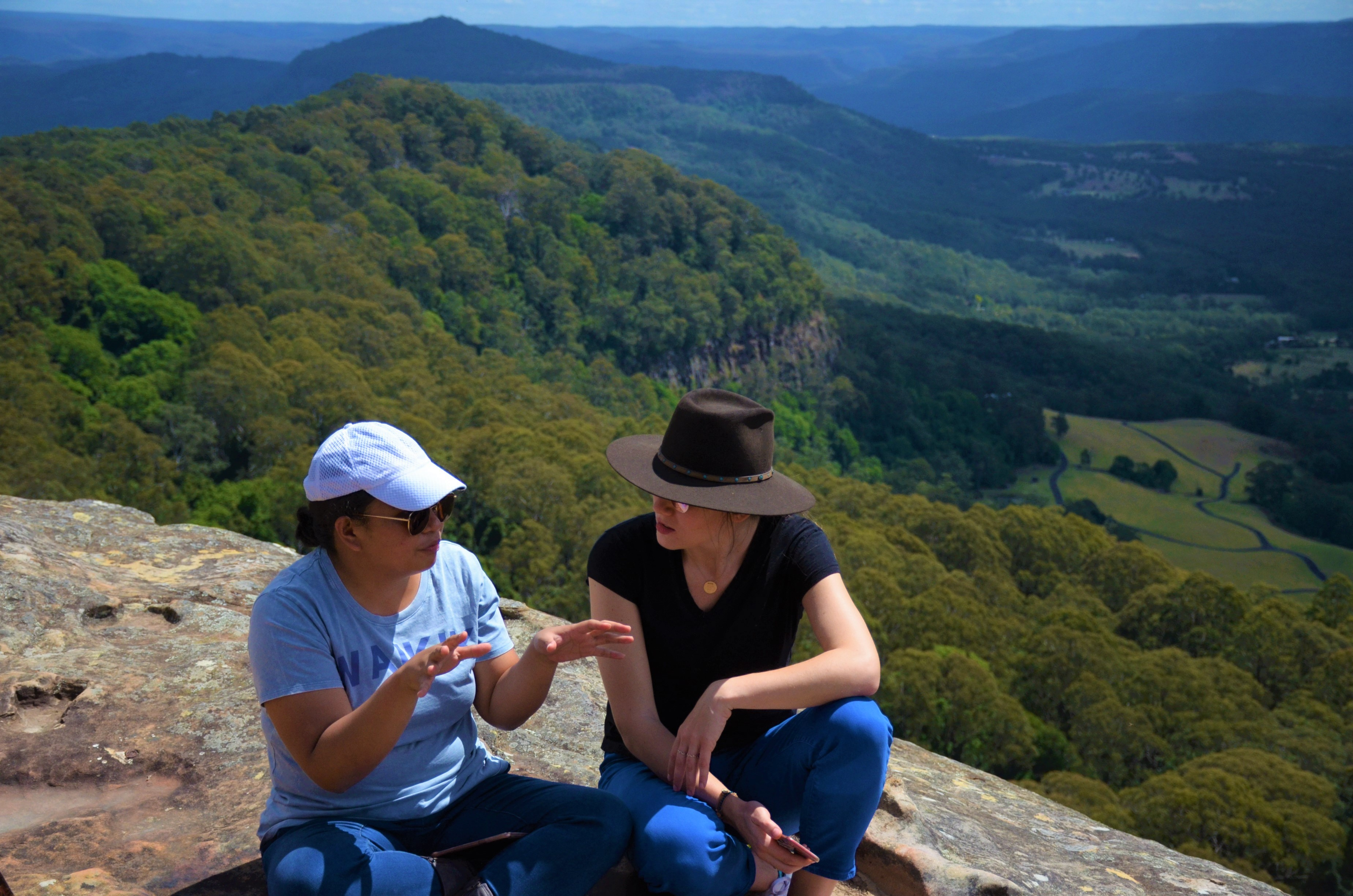
Enjoying the fresh air and the beautiful landscape while discussing the project

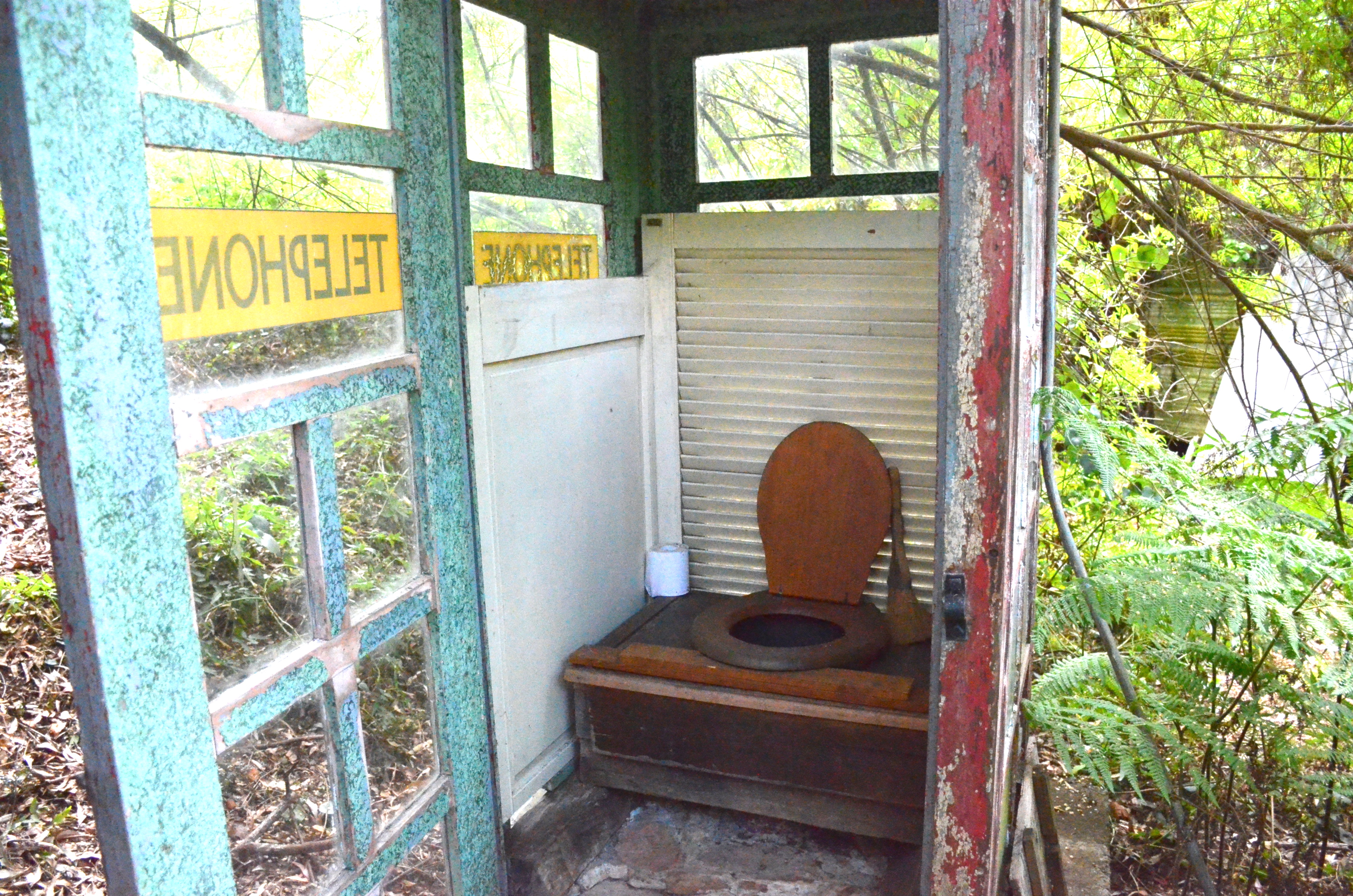
DIY toilet in nature

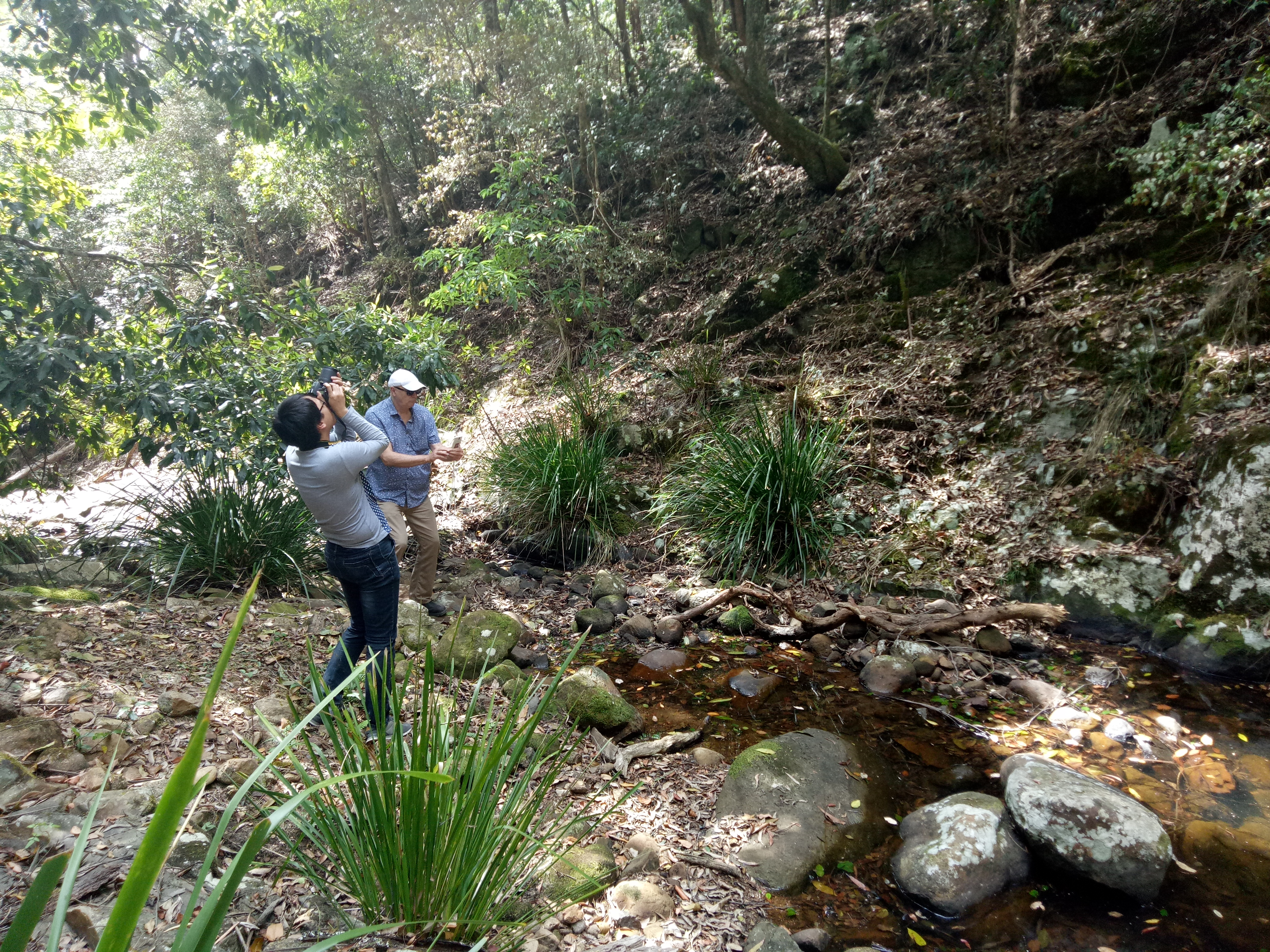
Zekai and David while taking photos of the waterfall
