= Illawarra-Shoalhaven subtropical rainforest =

Indigenous woodland community in Sydney, Australia

Illawarra-Shoalhaven Subtropical Rainforest of the Sydney Basin Bioregion
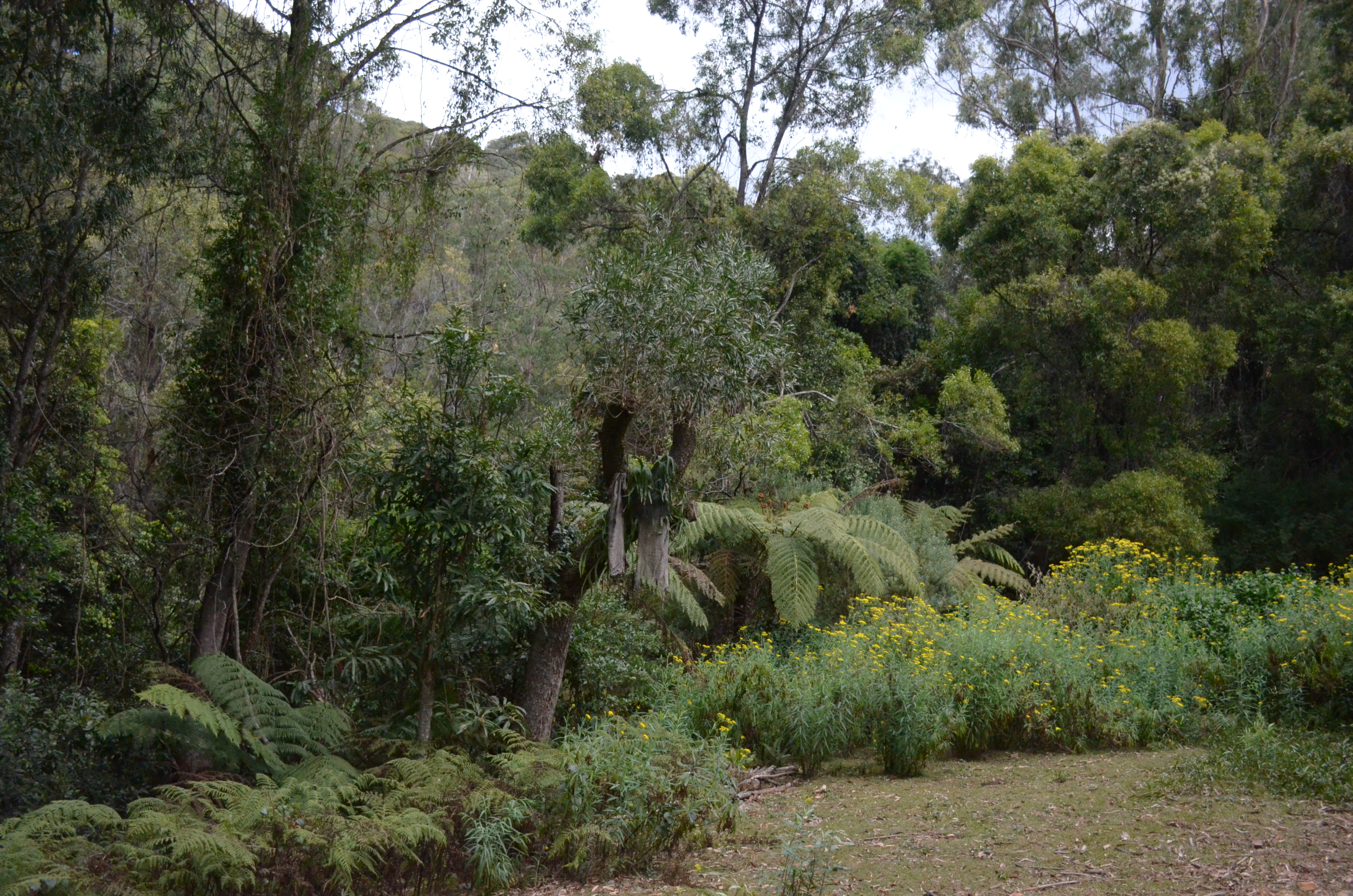
- Cambewarra Range Nature Reserve

Ecology
- Realm: Australasia
- Biome: Temperate broadleaf and mixed forests
- Borders: Blue Mountains and Southern Highlands Basalt Forests; Southern Highlands Shale Forest and Woodland

Geography
- Country: Australia
- Elevation: 50–400 metres (160–1,310 ft)
- Coordinates: 34.2°S 151.01°E
- Geology: Monzonite
- Climate type: Oceanic climate (Cfb)
- Soil types: Colluvium

The Illawarra-Shoalhaven subtropical rainforest, also called Illawarra Subtropical Rainforest (ISR) and Illawarra–Shoalhaven Subtropical Rainforest of the Sydney Basin Bioregion, is a scattered rainforest community in the Illawarra and Southern Sydney region of New South Wales, Australia. Occurring just south of Sydney, it spans from the Royal National Park (north of Wollongong) to the Milton-Ulladulla district in the south, albeit in scattered fragments. The Illawarra Escarpment Subtropical Rainforest is considered the most luxuriant rainforest community in the Greater Sydney region, although only small, isolated remnants occur within the Sydney metropolitan area.

== Geography ==
A mostly low to moderately tall closed rainforest with a dense mixed tree canopy, it is present on the coastal plain and on foothills beneath the precipitous slopes of the coastal escarpment, on comparatively fertile soils on the slopes and benches of the Illawarra Escarpment and across the Illawarra lowlands on the seaboard, seldom extending onto the upper slopes of the Escarpment.

Most of it is present between Gerringong and Stanwell Park, where it spans south to the Shoalhaven River and west into Kangaroo Valley, where other areas of fertile soils are present (e.g. volcanics, coal measures, or colluvial sediments from the escarpment). It is also found in on rocky scree and in deep gully lines. It is found in Local Government Areas (LGAs) of Kiama, Shellharbour, Shoalhaven, Sutherland and Wollongong; and may be present in contiguous LGAs such as Goulburn, Mulwaree and Wingecarribee. Examples of subtropical rainforest remnants in the Greater Sydney region occur at Picnic Point and along the Cedar Loop Track on Lady Carrington Drive in Royal National Park.

It is found in an area that is warm and humid, with higher rainfall in autumn, lower rainfall in late winter to spring and little possibility of severe frosts. Mean annual rainfall is greater than 1000 mm.

== Ecology ==
There is a scarcity of species from the genera Syncarpia, Acacia, Banksia, and Eucalyptus due to the moist, fertile soil. Canopy trees up to 35 m or more in height include Ficus spp., Dendrocnide excelsa, Toona ciliata, Dendrocnide excelsa, Streblus brunonianus, and Alphitonia excelsa.

Other smaller trees and shrubs include Alectryon subcinereus, Alphitonia excelsa, Baloghia inophylla, Brachychiton acerifolius, Citronella moorei, Claoxylon australe, Cryptocarya glaucescens, Cryptocarya microneura, Diospyros australis, Diospyros pentamera, Diploglottis australis, Ehretia acuminata, Elaeodendron australe, Guioa semiglauca, Myrsine variabilis, Pennantia cunninghamii, and Planchonella australis, in addition to climbers, forbs and native grasses.

=== Fauna ===
In addition to native bats, wallabies and possums, birds include Gerygone mouki, Pachycephala pectoralis, Meliphaga lewinii, Rhipidura albiscapa, Sericornis citreogularis, Acanthiza pusilla, Psophodes olivaceus, Monarcha melanopsis, Zosterops lateralis, Rhipidura rufifrons, Sericornis frontalis, Eopsaltria australis, Macropygia amboinensis, and Platycercus elegans.

Reptiles and amphibians include Intellagama lesueurii, Litoria citropa, Litoria peronii, Litoria phyllochroa, Litoria verreauxii, and Eulamprus quoyii.

== See also ==
- Temperate and subtropical rainforests of New South Wales
