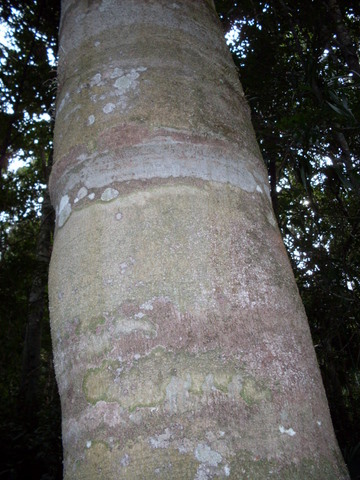
- A large Symplocos stawellii growing by the Hacking River, Australia

Scientific classification
- Kingdom: Plantae
- Clade: Tracheophytes
- Clade: Angiosperms
- Clade: Eudicots
- Clade: Asterids
- Order: Ericales
- Family: Symplocaceae
- Genus: Symplocos
- Species: S. stawellii

Binomial name
- Symplocos stawellii F.Muell.

Synonyms
- Symplocos cochinchinensis subsp. thwaitesii var. stawellii (F.Muell.) Nooteb.; Symplocos spicata Roxb. var australis Benth.; Symplocos cochinchinensis Lour. Moore var. stawellii F.Muell. Nooteb.

= Symplocos stawellii =

Species of tree

Symplocos stawellii, or the white hazelwood, is a rainforest tree growing in eastern Australia. It often grows along creeks in gullies, in tropical and sub-tropical rainforests. The natural distribution is from Gerringong Creek in the upper Kangaroo Valley (34° S) of New South Wales to the Atherton Tableland (17° S) in tropical Queensland. It also occurs in New Guinea.

== Description ==
A small to medium-sized tree, up to 30 metres tall and 80 cm in diameter, but usually much smaller. The trunk is straight and cylindrical, the butt is flanged in larger specimens.

The bark is fairly smooth; grey or fawn in colour. Often with horizontal bands. The outer surface sometimes has vertical pustules and horizontal cracks. Leaves alternate, firm and toothed, elliptic in shape 8 to 16 cm long with a rounded leaf tip. The leaf stalk is 9 to 20 mm and smooth. Veins are visible on both sides, more prominent below with the net veins visible.

The fragrant white flowers form in panicles between the months of April to July. The fruit is a fleshy drupe. Blue/black and egg shaped maturing in October to April. The brown pear-shaped seeds are 8 mm long. Fruit eaten by various rainforest birds such as rose-crowned fruit-dove and superb fruit-dove.

== Gallery ==
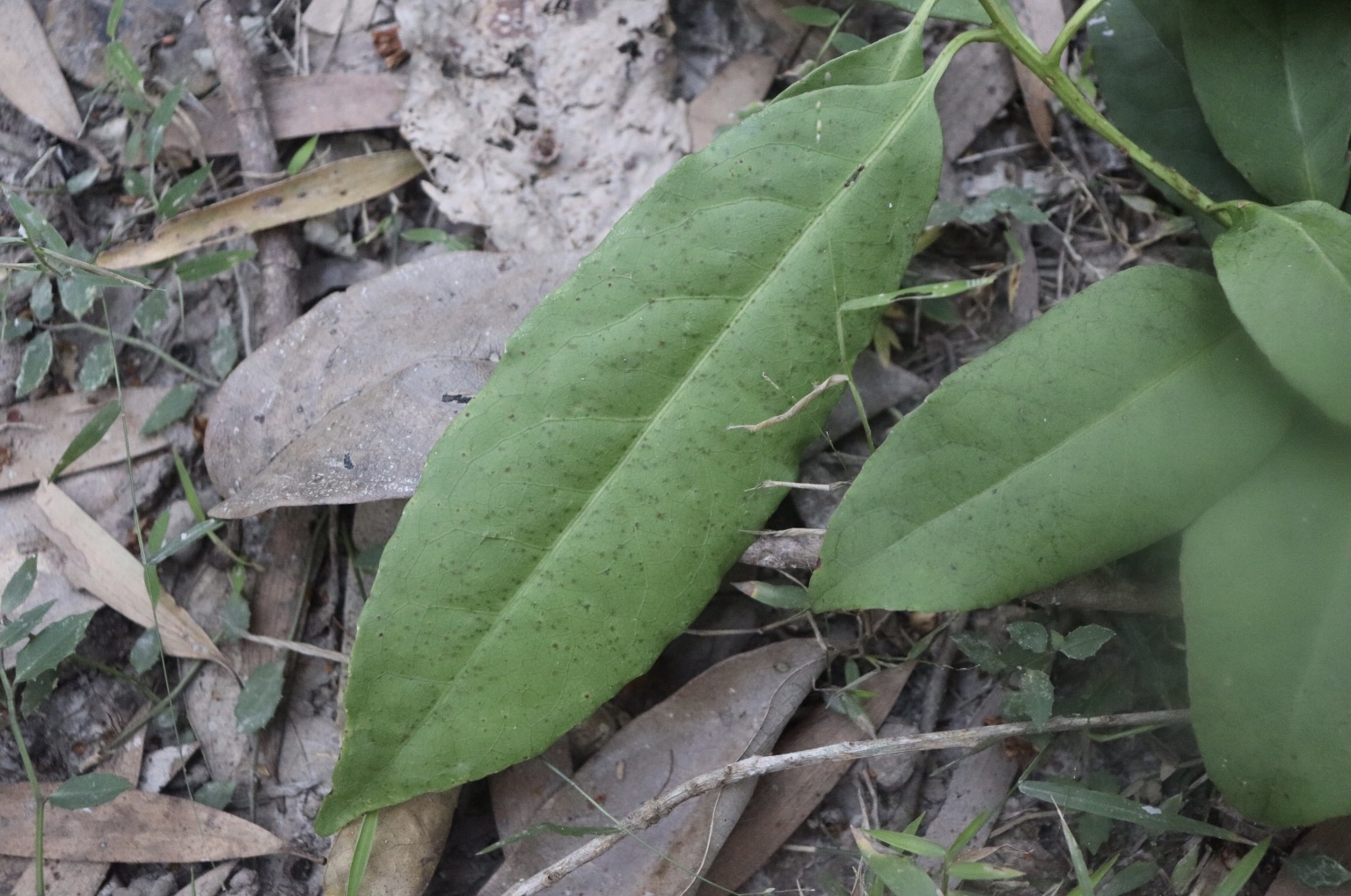
Symplocos stawellii leaf on forest floor, Little Mountain, QLD

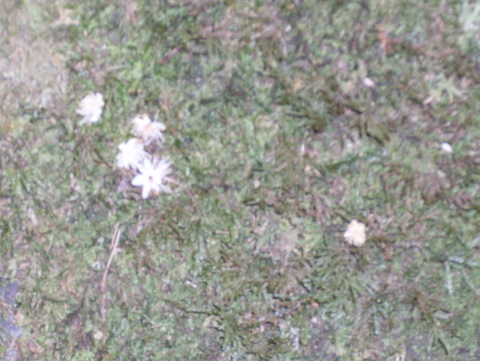
Symplocos stawellii flowers on the forest floor, Hacking River, Australia

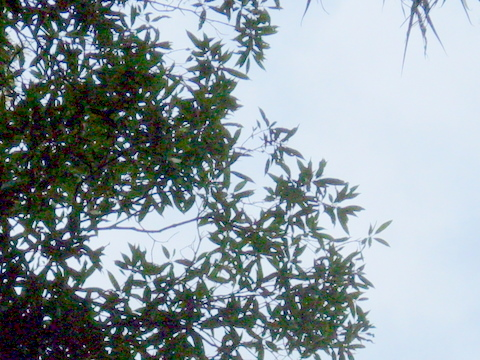
Symplocos stawellii foliage, photographed from the forest floor, Hacking River

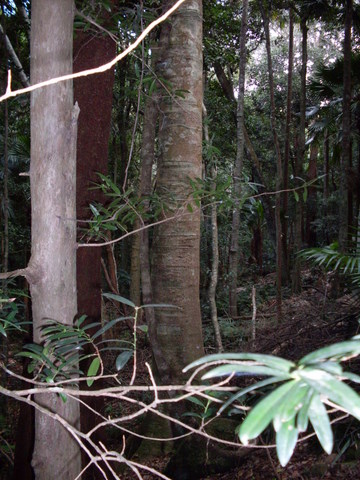
Podocarpus elatus (foreground left) and the trunk of Symplocos stawellii, Hacking River
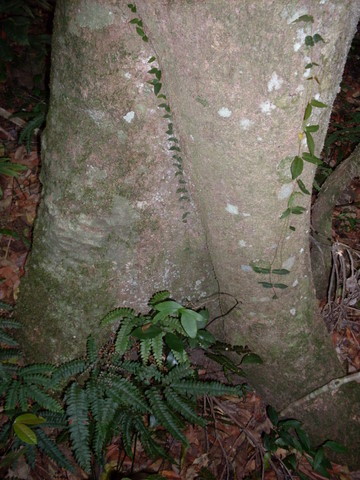
Symplocos stawellii base of tree, Hacking River

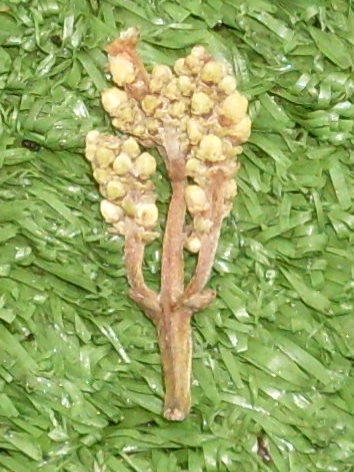
flower panicle of Symplocos stawellii

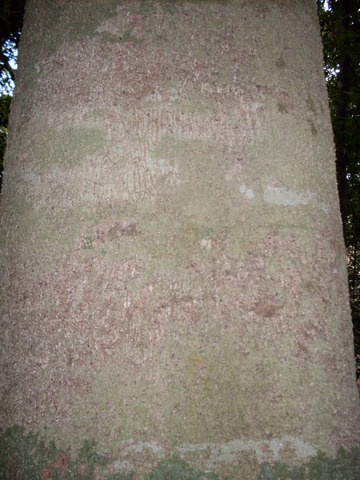
Symplocos stawellii close up of bark
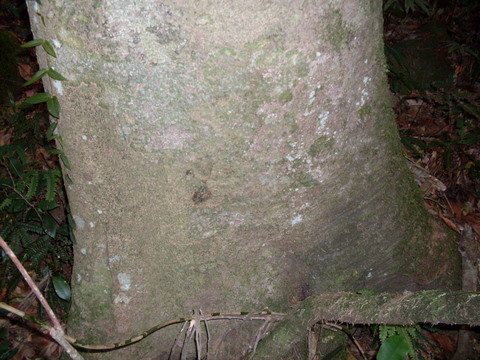
Symplocos stawellii base of tree, Hacking River

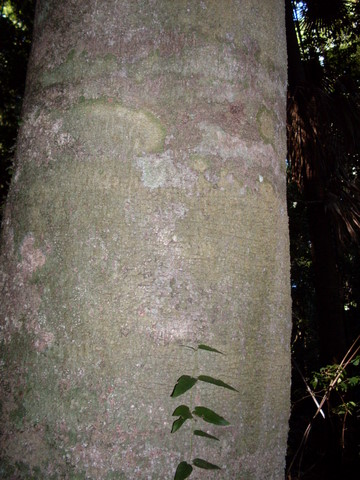
Symplocos stawellii, Hacking River
