= Kangaroo River Nature Reserve =

Protected area in New South Wales, Australia

- IUCN category Ia (strict nature reserve)
- Location within New South Wales
- Location: New South Wales
- Nearest city: Kangaroo Valley
- Coordinates: 34°43′50″S 150°27′12″E
- Area: 1.26 km^{2} (0.49 sq mi)
- Established: January 2001
- Governing body: NSW National Parks and Wildlife Service
- Website: Official website

The Kangaroo River Nature Reserve, part of the Kangaroo Valley Group of Nature Reserves, is a protected nature reserve that is located on the floor of the Kangaroo Valley in the Southern Highlands and South Coast regions of New South Wales in eastern Australia. The reserve is situated approximately 150 kilometres (93 mi) south of Sydney, 50 kilometres (31 mi) southwest of Wollongong and 16 kilometres (9.9 mi) northwest of Nowra. The reserve has a protective covenant placed upon it with purpose to ensure the protection of the natural heritage of this area. National parks in the area include the Morton National Park and the Budderoo National Park. Other nature reserves in the area include the Barren Grounds Nature Reserve, and the Cambewarra Range, Barrengarry and Rodway nature reserves – the latter three part of the Kangaroo Valley Group of Nature Reserves.

== Features ==
Reserves are a proactive approach to ensure environmental stressors can be removed which can avoid potential decline and extinction of the more vulnerable species but species that are common within a wide range of environmental conditions can still be susceptible to environmental changes resulting in their local decline or extinction. The National Trust have also listed the Kangaroo Valley, Barrengarry, Kangaroo River and parts of the Rodway and Camberwarra Range nature reserves as Scenic Protection Areas. The reserves help to protect areas of significance that are home to many communities, rainforest, deep gullies, waterfalls, cliffs with places of distinct beauty

== Ecology ==
There is an overlap of habitats of the coastal areas to east and the tablelands to the west with microhabitats created by the differing vegetation, creeks and rocky regions. These protected areas provide habitat that is of high quality for flora and fauna species. The reserves are covered by the Southern Regional Forest Agreement. Even though many reserves are not in themselves large, it is considered necessary to maintain viable populations with the beneficial supplementary nature of the smaller reserves which cannot be understated and in many cases may be the only option for the management of species under stressors that threaten survival. Kangaroo Valley is made up of wet sclerophyll forests, heath lands and rainforest. The rainforests are mainly in the gullies and creaks of the valley; with an abundance of cabbage tree palms (Livistona australis), epiphytes of birds-nest (Asplenium nidus) and tree ferns (Cyatheales). The leafless tongue orchid (Cryptostylis hunteriana) is considered vulnerable with sightings of this plant between Batemans Bay and Nowra.

One plant that exists adjacent to the Kangaroo River reserve is the Illawarra stinking arum (Typhonium eliosurum). This plant has been listed as a Rare or Threatened Australian Plant (RoTAP).

Most of the vegetation contained within the reserves in Kangaroo Valley with the exception of the Kangaroo River Nature Reserve, is mature, old growth forest. Previous logging activity, fires and gravel extraction within the Kangaroo River Nature reserve have created areas of disturbance with small regrowth areas that is evident in parts.

== Fauna ==
Below is a list of birds, amphibians and mammals that have been sighted within the reserves and are listed in the NSW Threatened Species Conservation Act 1995.

=== Birds ===
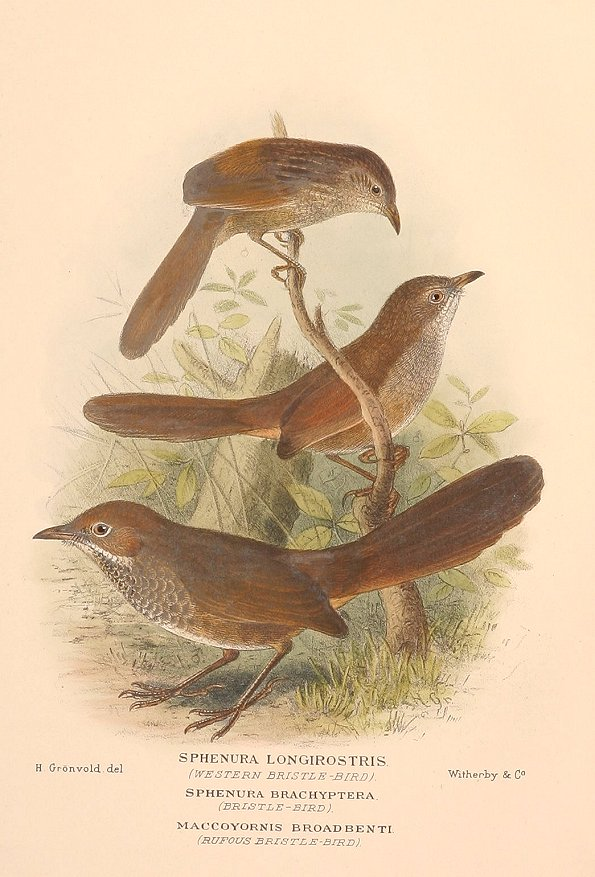
Eastern bristlebird (Dasyornis brachypterus brachypterus)

Eastern bristlebird (Dayornis brachypterus brachypterus), swift parrot (Lathamus discolour), powerful owl (Ninox strenua), sooty owl (Tyto tenebricosa), olive whistler (Pachycephala olivacea), regent honeyeater (Xanthomyza Phrygia), turquoise parrot (Neophema pulchella) and the Australian masked owl (Tyto novaehollandiae).

=== Amphibians ===
There is just the one amphibian the giant burrowing frog that is represented in the NSW Threatened Species Conservation Act 1995, with 2 reptiles listed also; the broad-headed snake and the heath monitor.

=== Mammals ===
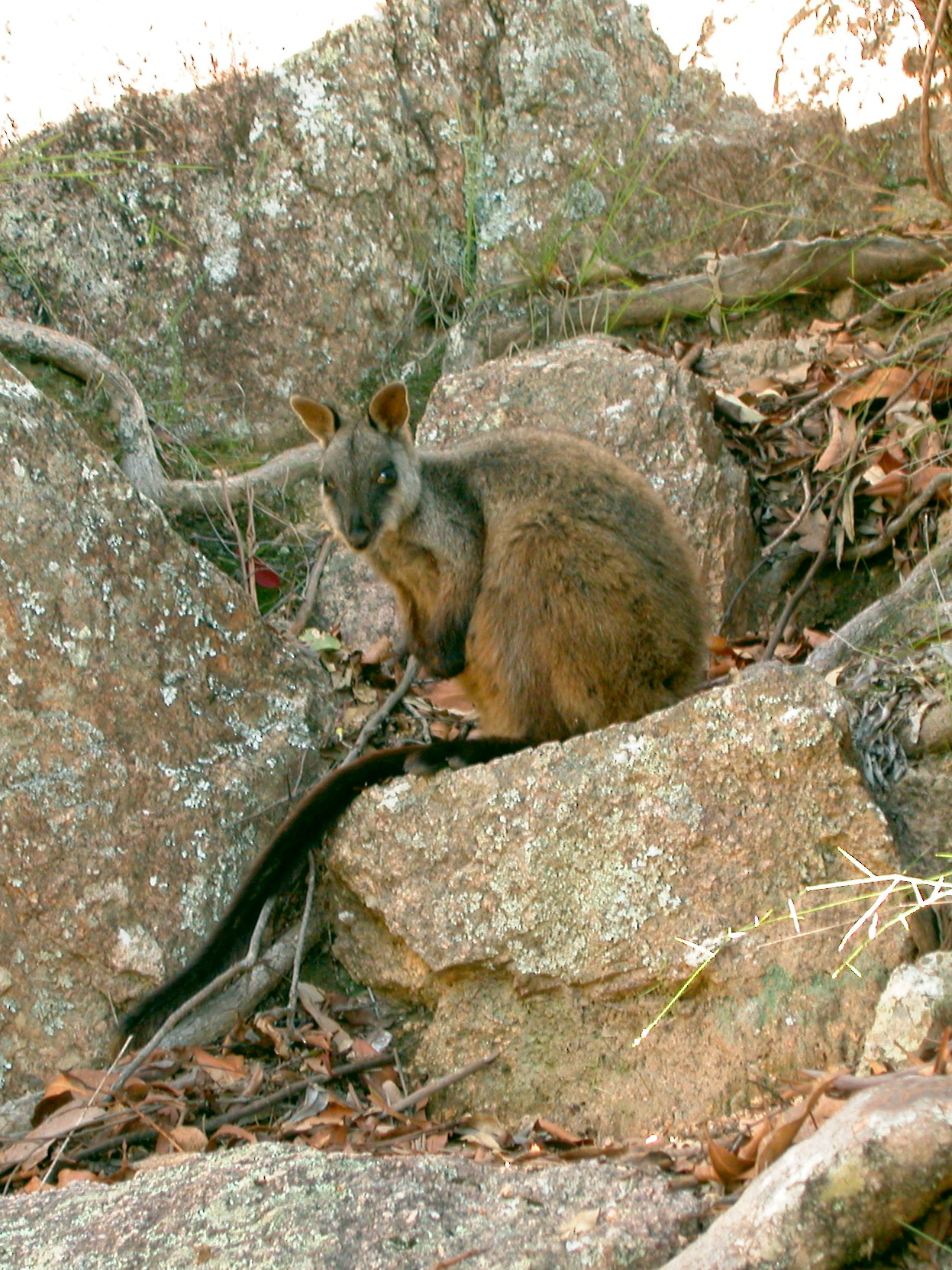
Brush-tailed rock wallaby (Petrogale penicillata)

Also on the list contained in the act are seven mammals. They are the; brushed tailed rock-wallaby (Petrogale penicullata), yellow-bellied glider (Petaurus australis), spotted-tailed quoll (Dasyurus maculates), long-nosed potoroo (Potoous trudactylus), eastern bent-wing bat (Miniopterus schreidersii), smoky mouse (Pseudomys fumeus), greater broad-nosed bat (Scoteanax rueppellii).

The yellow-bellied glider (Petaurus australis) and eastern bristlebird (Dasyornis brachypterus) are amongst other local fauna species that are considered regionally endangered. It is integral to the continued survival of the yellow-bellied glider that the sap trees that are used by the glider as well as non-sap trees such as the grey gum (Eucalyptus punctata) are conserved.

As the eastern bristlebird (Dasyornis brachypterus brachypterus) naturally inhabits the ground areas of dense fire prone areas, the primary reason for their population decline can be associated with fire, habitat loss and nest desertion. This then in turn indicates a need for great care to be taken in fire management in places there is eastern bristlebird habitation and to make sure there is unburned vegetation left to allow remaining birds a refuge One of the locally endangered species is the brush-tailed wallaby. This wallaby survives on naturally fragmented areas of rocky outcrops in small groups to a maximum of about 30 individuals

== Flora ==
The four reserves are home to five vegetation types; heathland, open forest, rainforest and tall moist forest. The areas vegetation is greatly affected by differing soil types and can be seen in the species taking advantage of the fertile volcanic areas, whilst the sandstone, siltstone and mudstone areas contain species that are more tolerant to shallow soils and water scarcity.

Species of note in the Kangaroo River Nature reserve are; scribbly gum (Eucalyptus sclerophylls), red bloodwood (Corymbia polycarpa) and grey gum (E. punctata). This reserve has in the past been used for grazing with a section of the north western area used to extract gravel for the construction of the Bendeela and Tallowa Dam roads. Regrowth from previous uses can be observed in this reserve.

Rodway Nature reserve has similar species, however, there are species specific to Rodway Reserve, such as; Sydney peppermint (E. piperita), silvertop ash (E. sieberi), turpentine (Syncarpia glomulifera), brown barrel (E. fastigata), white topped box (E. quadranulata), river peppermint (E. elata), flax leaf paperbark (Melaleuca linariifolia), yellow tea tree (Leptospermum polygalifolium) and currant bush (Leptomeria acida).

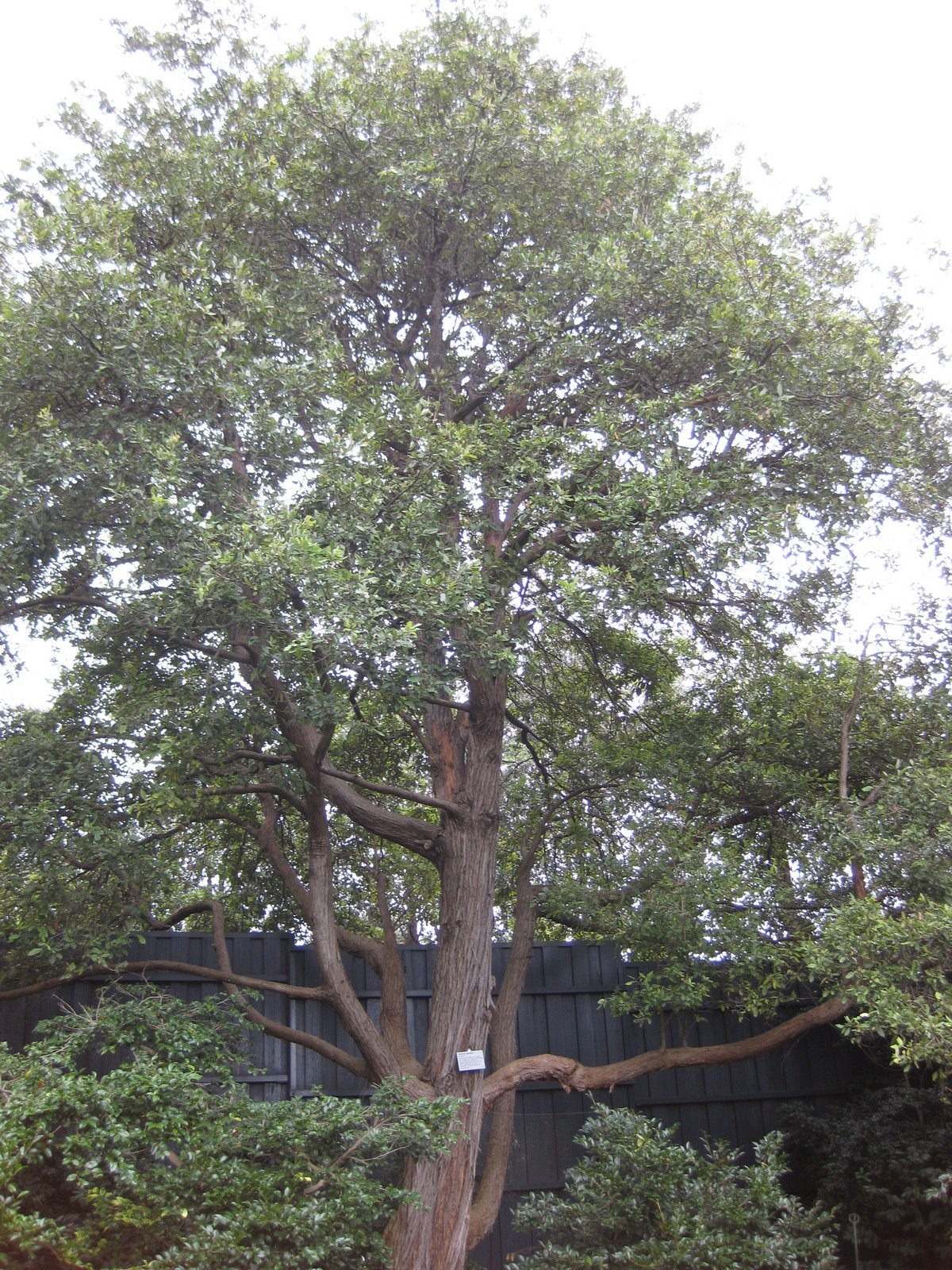
Turpentine (Syncarpia glomulifera)

The Cambewarra Range Nature reserve is the largest of these reserves being 1684 hectares of mostly old growth forest and shares certain species with some of the other reserves, but have some species of note that are more prevalent in this reserve. They are: coachwood (Ceratopetalum apetalum), sassafras (Doryphora sassafras), Lilly pilly (Syzgium smithii) and native laurel (Cryptocarya glaucescens).

The endangered shrub species Solanum celatum has also been recorded on the Cambewarra Range reserve, whilst the vulnerable, furred tongued orchid (Cryptostylis hunteriana) has been found at an area within the Cambewarra Range reserve called the Red Rock plateau.

Barrengarry Nature reserve has a remnant area of 21 hectares (52 acres) and contains the following tree species; Sydney blue gum-bangalay (Eucalyptus saligna), turpentine (Syncarpia glomulifera), spotted gum (Corymbia maculate), and the blackbutt (Eucalyptus pilularis).

== Environmental threats ==
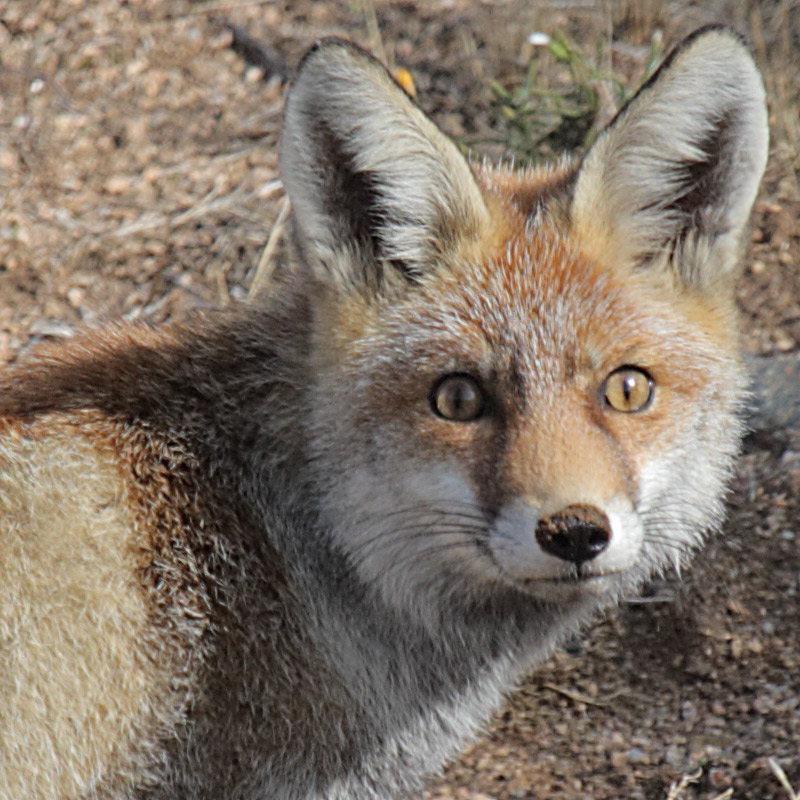
Fox (Vulpes vulpes vulpes)

The major threats to most of the plant and animal species in the valley are development, fire and introduced species. The Kangaroo River Nature Reserve was used for gravel extraction in the building of roads. It was also used for grazing.

Within the nature reserves of Barrengarry, Roday and Cambewarra Range reserve areas the threats from human settlement started with the logging of red cedar (Toona ciliate) trees in the early 1800s This was then followed by clearing of the forests for agricultural reasons.

Weeds and introduced fauna species such as foxes, feral goats and rabbits continue to be a problem. Edge effects occur where the reserves are next to areas of cleared forest allowing the proliferation of weeds and the incursion of stock and feral animals.

Bushfire prevention policies such as indiscriminate burning and the construction of roads, which cut through formally closed rainforest environments, are considerably damaging

Kangaroo Valley is a popular holiday recreational area which has also been known to put pressures on the natural areas by supporting tourist services such as campsites and walking trails.

== Management ==
The National Parks and Wildlife Act 1974 No.80 Part 5 is instrumental in the formation of management plans to ensure the protection of remnant areas of forest, endangered, critically endangered and vulnerable species and ecological communities. The Kangaroo Valley group of nature reserves has one such management plan. Section 72AA, of the National Parks and Wildlife Act 1974 No. 80, ‘Objective and content of the plans of management’, contains all matters that are required to be taken into consideration when constructing plans of management.

Environmental groups such as the Kangaroo Valley Environment Group Incorporated are vitally important in the maintenance and continued management of the reserves. They receive support and financial grants from various government agencies such as the Sydney Catchment Authority, Shoalhaven City Council and Shoalhaven Landcare Association. The other Landcare groups in the area are the Broger's Creek Landcare group, the Upper Kangaroo Valley Landcare Group, the Friends of the brush-tailed rock wallaby and the Kangaroo Valley Garden Group.

== See also ==
- Protected areas of New South Wales
