= Hacking River =

River in Sydney, New South Wales, Australia

Hacking
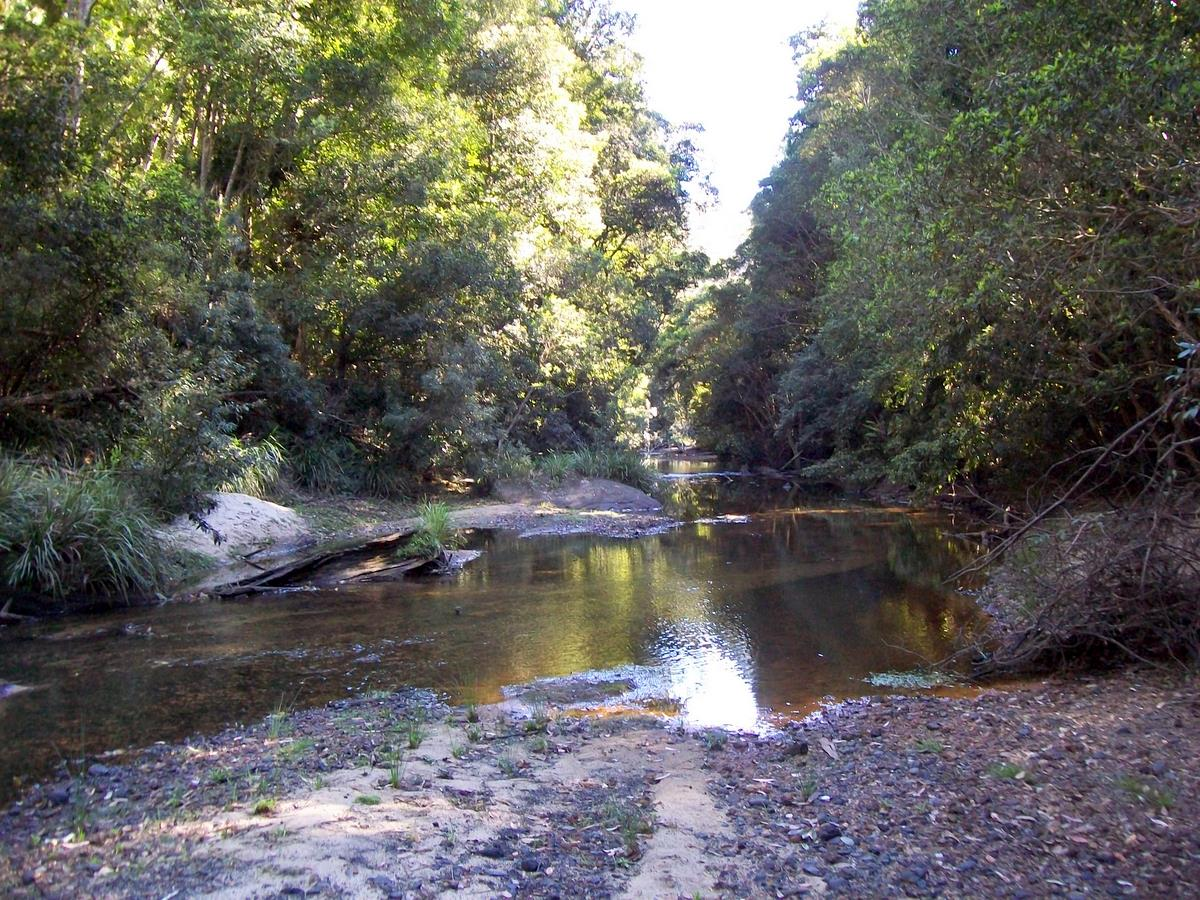
- Hacking River, midway through its journey in the Royal National Park, Australia
- Etymology: named after seaman Henry Hacking, a pilot at Port Jackson

Location
- Country: Australia
- State: New South Wales
- Region: Sydney basin (IBRA), Southern Sydney
- Local government areas: Wollongong, Sutherland

Physical characteristics
- Source: Kellys Creek
  - location: below Kellys Falls
  - coordinates: 34°12′45″S 150°58′45″E
  - elevation: 91 m (299 ft)
- Mouth: Port Hacking
  - location: west of Yowie Bay
  - coordinates: 34°3′40″S 151°6′0″E
  - elevation: 7 m (23 ft)
- Length: 26 km (16 mi)

Basin features
- National park: Royal National Park

The Hacking River is a watercourse located to the south of Sydney, New South Wales in Australia.

For thousands of years the indigenous Tharawal (or Dharwal) people called the river Deeban. British colonial settlers named the river after Henry Hacking, a British seaman, pilot at Port Jackson and explorer in colonial New South Wales, who killed the Aboriginal, Pemulwuy

== Course ==
Drawing its source from the east north-eastern runoff of the plateau above the Illawarra escarpment, drained via Kellys Creek and Gills Creek, both terminating in waterfalls adjacent to each other. The waters of both creeks combine in the valley below, forming the Hacking River. Kellys Creek rises bout 3 kilometres (1.9 mi) south of Helensburgh, east of the Princes Highway and west of Stanwell Tops. The Hacking River flows generally north north-east before reaching its estuary, Port Hacking, at a line between Grays Point and Point Danger, about 4 kilometres (2.5 mi) east of the suburb of Engadine, west of Yowie Bay. The river descends 84 metres (276 ft) over its 26-kilometre (16 mi) course. Although the Illawarra escarpment has a substantial rainfall, in dry periods, the river can be reduced to a mere trickle, resulting in connected puddles rather than a constant flow.

== Ecology and environment ==
Its upper reaches lie adjacent to the Garawarra State Conservation Area, where it is a narrow stream in a gully within rainforest. The river passes through a variety of plant communities, such as dry eucalyptus forest, tall wet eucalyptus forest and rainforests. Significant rainforest plants growing by the river banks include white beech, citronella, supplejack, Bangalow palm, jackwood and golden sassafras. The blackbutt, grey ironbark and bangalay are common eucalyptus trees. As it moves downstream, it flattens and widens before it reaches the estuary at Port Hacking.

A variety of molluscs, crustaceans, insects, fish and birds live in and around the river. Long finned eels migrate from oceanic spawning grounds as elvers. As adults they mature in the creeks and streams of the Royal National Park, sometimes to be seen in the river pools. Jollytail are common small fish. Platypus may occasionally be seen in the river, and azure kingfishers nest in the river banks. The land snail Meridolum marshalli is restricted to Royal National Park; its main habitat is wet areas near the river.

Platypus once found habitat in the Hacking River, until an oil spill on the Princes Highway in the 1970s saw the last platypus disappear. In May 2023, the species was returned to the national park under a relocation program jointly conducted by the University of New South Wales, NSW National Parks and Wildlife Service and the World Wildlife Fund.

Most of the river flows through Garawarra State Conservation Area and the Royal National Park. However, at its upper reaches, it has been subject to severe impacts of urbanisation (Helensburgh and Otford), timber cutting, clearing and rural activities, a large coal mine, gravel mines, leachates from Helensburgh tip and a private waste tip, sewer disposal sites, including Garrawarra Hospital, a night soil dump adjacent to Helensburgh tip and septic tank use, and the construction and use of the Princes Highway and Sydney to Wollongong railway.

The soft soils are vulnerable to erosion, which is exacerbated by bushwalking. Erosion is facilitated by relatively high rainfall in the Garrawarra State Conservation Area. Furthermore, runoff from the towns of Helensburgh, Otford and Stanwell Tops (which lie above the catchment) has also impacted on water quality in the river, resulting in increased turbidity and algal growth.

== History and human development ==
=== Aboriginal history ===
The river valley underwent significant change with sea level rise 18,000 to 7,500 years ago which completely displaced inhabitants of previous coastal and river valley areas and resulted in dramatic changes in distributions of peoples. For more than 8,000 years prior to 1840, the Tharawal (or Dharwal) people occupied the catchment area evidenced by hundreds of Aboriginal artefacts, middens, rock carvings and cave paintings.

The Gweagal people lived mainly by the saltwater bays and estuaries of Port Hacking. They also used the freshwater resources of the upper Hacking River, Heathcote Creek and the Woronora River. The Gweagal people were said to be the guardians of the sacred white clay pits on their territorial land, now known as the Kurnell Peninsula. They used the clay to make body paint, medicine and when mixed with local berries it was also used as a dietary supplement.

=== Post-British colonial settlement ===
In the mid-19th century shell grit was in high demand as a source of lime for building in the Sydney district. Consequently, mud and oyster rocks were collected in large numbers from Port Hacking catchment destroying a number of aboriginal midden sites in the region.

The river is crossed by four causeways at and near the village of Otford near its headwaters. At Otford below the railway station is a small dam, constructed for the supply of water for steam locomotives. A causeway is incorporated as part of the structure, which results in a substantial pond upstream. Other significant structures are the Upper Crossing (below Waterfall and above the confluence with Waterfall Creek) and at Audley. The causeway at Audley was built in 1899, within the Royal National Park. Here, mangrove flats were cleared to make way for boat-sheds and accommodation in the late 19th century. A boatshed and picnic grounds remain at Audley, having been used continuously since. Visitors can canoe and kayak further upstream along the Hacking River or its tributary Kangaroo Creek. Within the Royal National Park at Audley, visitors have enjoyed picnic and boating facilities for more than a hundred years.

A consequence of the weir was to divide the river into freshwater/saltwater tidal components. Impacts were to impede fish migration and to cause the accretion of sediment behind the weir. In flood, the road across the causeway is impassable, thus isolating the villages of Bundeena and Maianbar. As the Upper Causeway would also flood in these conditions, an all-weather bridge was built at the Upper Causeway.

The tide reaches the weir, and although there is some lag, there is virtually no tidal prism. From the weir, the river continues downstream in the main through the Royal National Park, although towards its fluvial delta at Grays Point, it flows on one side through the suburbs of Kirrawee and Grays Point. It is opposite Grays Point that Muddy Creek joins the River. From this point downstream the river is characterised by large stands of mangroves and an extensive fluvial delta. Historically, the fluvial sediments below the weir have been restrictive to navigation. After the declaration of the national park, the trustees were concerned to facilitate boat access to the new park and consequently training walls were built. Subsequently, as navigation increased, there was repeated pressure for dredging. The fluvial delta has not been dredged for many years. Nonetheless, there is a well-used boating facility at Swallow Rock (Grays Point).

== See also ==
- List of rivers of Australia
- List of rivers of New South Wales (A-K)
- Rivers of New South Wales
- Guide to Sydney Rivers site
