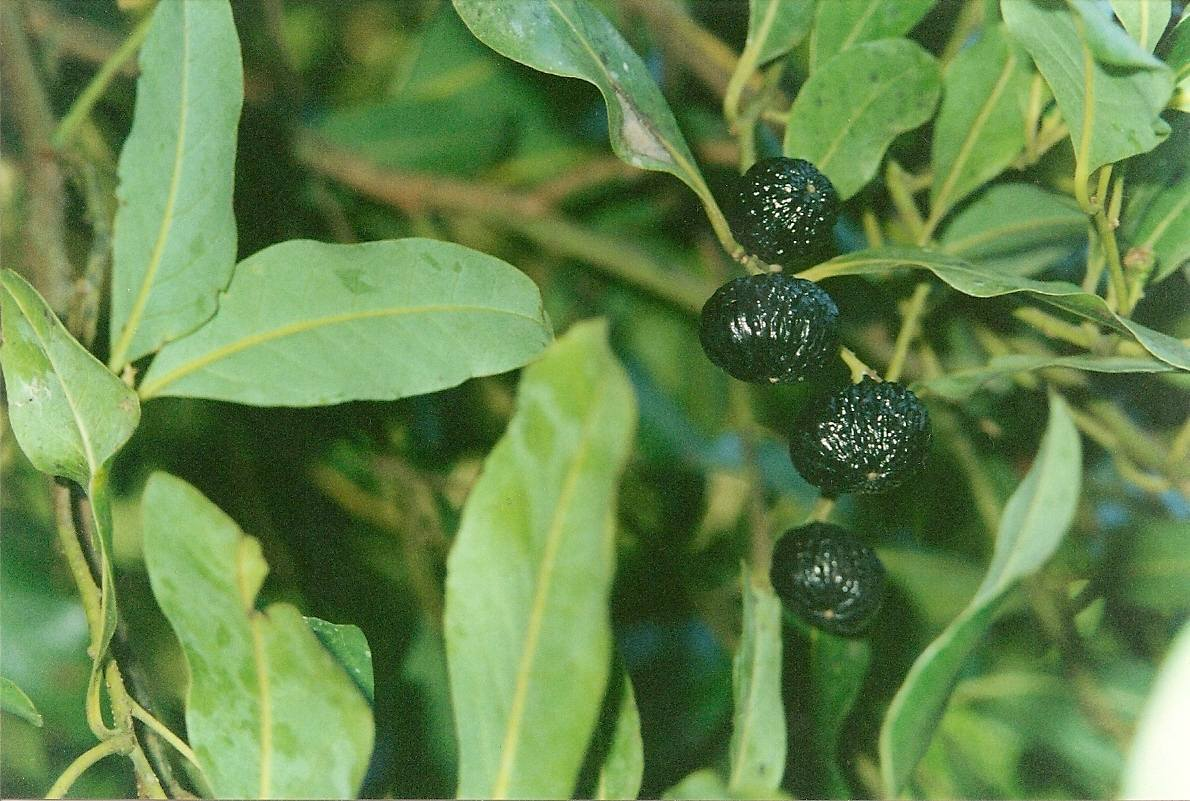
- Near the Hacking River

Conservation status
- Least Concern (IUCN 3.1)

Scientific classification
- Kingdom: Plantae
- Clade: Tracheophytes
- Clade: Angiosperms
- Clade: Magnoliids
- Order: Laurales
- Family: Lauraceae
- Genus: Cryptocarya
- Species: C. glaucescens

Binomial name
- Cryptocarya glaucescens R.Br.

= Cryptocarya glaucescens =

Species of tree

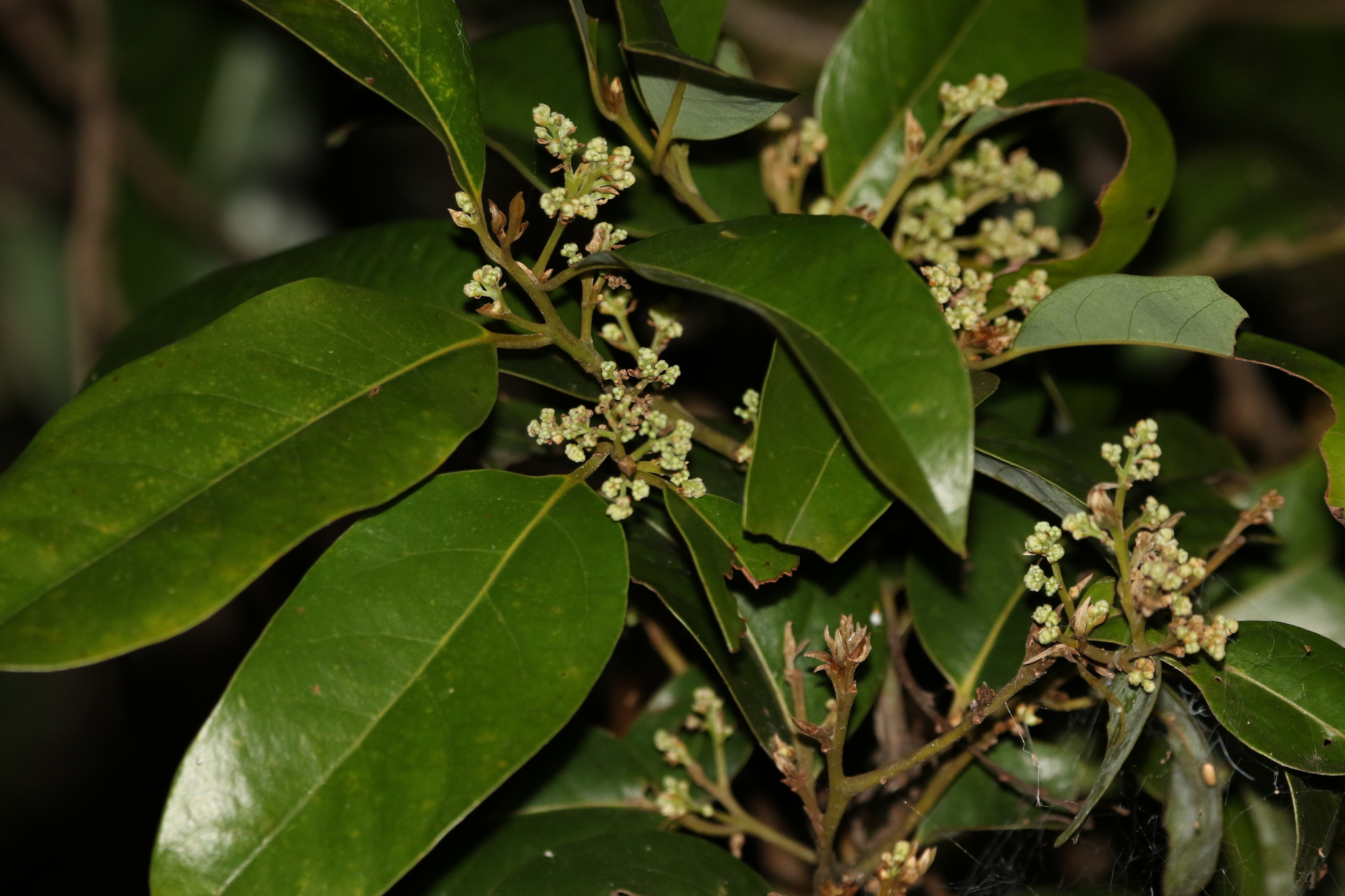
Flowers in Carindale

Cryptocarya glaucescens, commonly known as jackwood, silver sycamore, native laurel, brown beech, bolly laurel or brown laurel, is a species of flowering plant in the laurel family and is endemic to eastern Australia. Its leaves are lance-shaped to elliptic, the flowers cream-coloured or pale green, perfumed and tube-shaped, and the fruit a black drupe.

== Description ==
Cryptocarya glaucescens is a tree that typically grows to a height of up to 30 m (98 ft) with a trunk dbh of 90 cm (35 in), its stem sometimes buttressed. The bark is dark brown or reddish brown and often scaly. Its leaves are arranged alternately, lance-shaped to elliptic, 55–100 mm (2.2–3.9 in) long, 25–40 mm (0.98–1.57 in) wide on a petiole 5–9 mm (0.20–0.35 in) long and glaucous on the lower surface.

The flowers are cream-coloured to green, perfumed, arranged in panicles in leaf axils and usually shorter than the leaves. The perianth tube is 1.0–1.5 mm (0.039–0.059 in) long and 1.0–1.3 mm (0.039–0.051 in) wide, the outer tepals 0.5–0.6 mm (0.020–0.024 in) long and 0.4–0.5 mm (0.016–0.020 in) wide, the inner tepals 0.5–0.6 mm (0.020–0.024 in) long and 0.2–0.4 mm (0.0079–0.0157 in) wide. The ovary is 0.8–1.0 mm (0.031–0.039 in) long and 0.4–0.5 mm (0.016–0.020 in) wide and glabrous with a glabrous style. Flowering occurs in October and November, and the fruit is a laterally compress black drupe, 12–21 mm (0.47–0.83 in) long and 13–25 mm (0.51–0.98 in) wide.

== Taxonomy ==
Cryptocarya glaucescens was first formally described in 1810 by Robert Brown in his book, Prodromus Florae Novae Hollandiae. The specific epithet (glaucescens) means 'becoming bluish-grey or -green'.

== Distribution and habitat ==
Jackwood grows in rainforest, typically in poorer soils, from sea level to 1,000 m (3,300 ft) elevation, from Mount Dromedary (36° S) in southern New South Wales to Eungella National Park (20° S) in central Queensland.

== Ecology ==
The fruit of C. glaucescens is eaten by rainforest birds including the topknot pigeon. Fruit are ripe from March to June.
