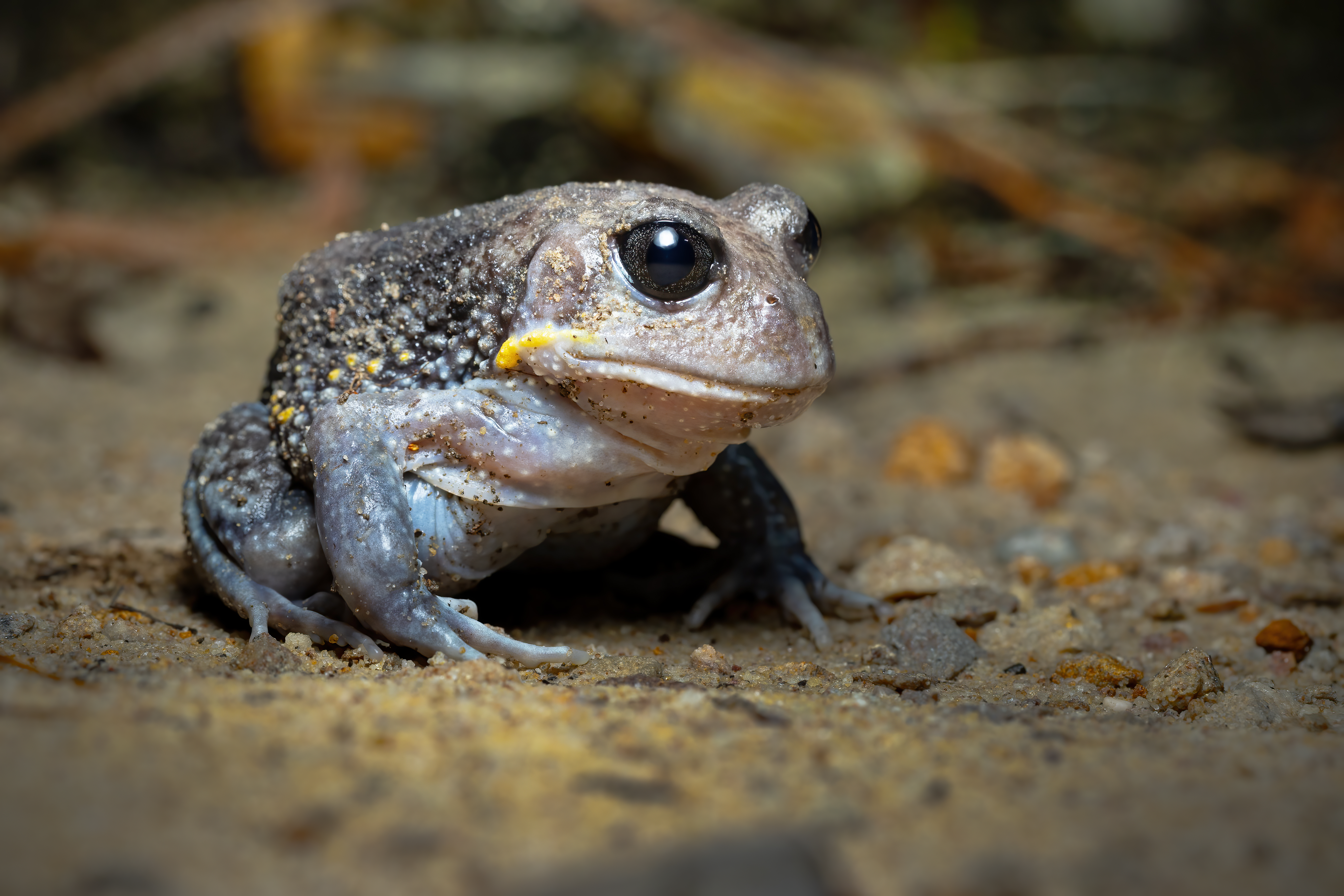

Conservation status
- Endangered (IUCN 3.1)

Scientific classification
- Kingdom: Animalia
- Phylum: Chordata
- Class: Amphibia
- Order: Anura
- Family: Limnodynastidae
- Genus: Heleioporus
- Species: H. australiacus

Binomial name
- Heleioporus australiacus Shaw & Nodder, 1795
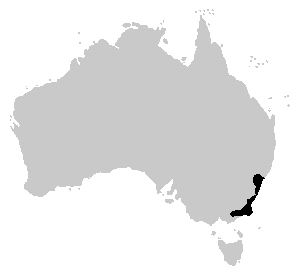
- Range of the giant burrowing frog

Synonyms
- Rana australiaca (Shaw and Nodder, 1795); Rana spinipes (Schneider, 1799); Bufo spinipes (Daudin, 1802); Philocryphus flavoguttatus (Fletcher, 1894); Heleioporus flavoguttatus Fletcher, 1894; Philocryphus australiacus (Shaw and Nodder, 1795)

= Giant burrowing frog =

Species of amphibian

The giant burrowing frog or eastern owl frog (Heleioporus australiacus) is a large frog species that occurs in coastal south-east New South Wales and Victoria in Australia. It is also known as the owl frog, southern owl frog, spotted owl frog, burrowing owl frog.

== Description ==
This is a large species of frog, up to 10 centimetres (3.9 in) in length. It is normally grey, dark brown or black on the back. It is white on the belly. There are yellow spots on the side and a yellow stripe on the upper lip, from the back of the eye to the back of the tympanum. In metamorph frogs, this stripe is pink-orange in colour. The skin is rough and bumpy, males often have black spines on their fingers during the breeding season. The iris is silver and the pupil is vertical.

This is quite a large species of frog and the largest frog in Victoria. It is often mistaken for the cane toad because of its large size and bumpy skin; however, cane toads do not have vertical irises, and the range of the cane toad currently does not overlap into giant burrowing frog habitat.

== Ecology and behaviour ==
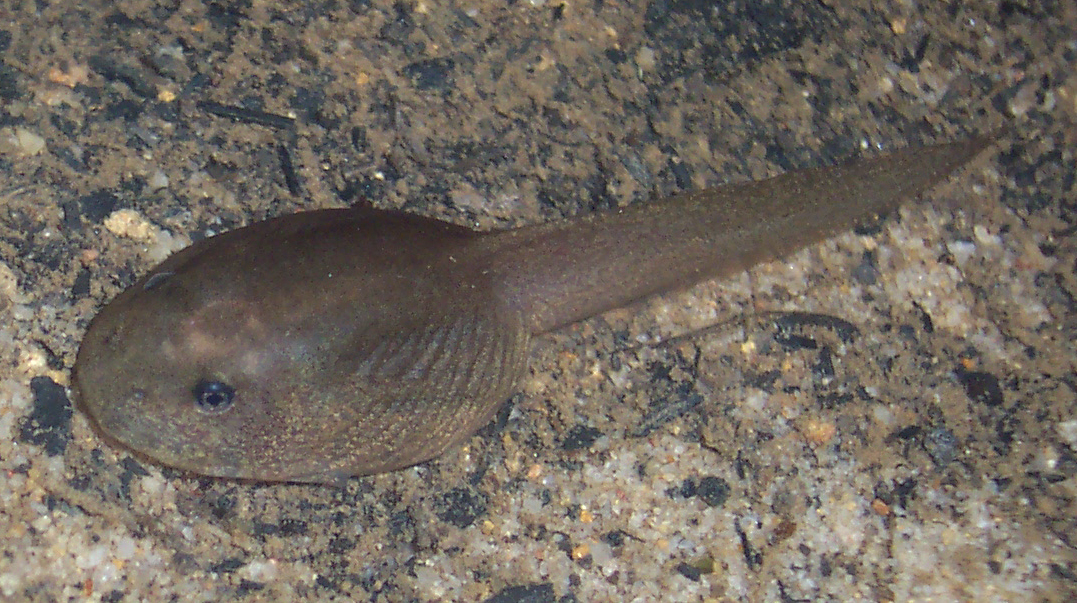
A giant burrowing frog tadpole

This species inhabits sandstone heathland, dry, and also wet sclerophyll forest from north of Sydney to eastern Victoria. They are called burrowing frogs because of their burrowing ability.

Males call from burrows on the edges of creeks during autumn and spring, usually after heavy rainfall. The call of the giant burrow frog is very low-pitched "ou-ou-ou-ou-ou", somewhat resembling that of an owl (hence the name), and only lasts one or two seconds. The spines on the males' fingers may be used for fighting.

The female lays between 750 and 1250 unpigmented eggs, either in inundated burrows or underneath heavy vegetation in dams, ditches, and slow-flowing streams. The tadpoles develop in the stream, escaping when it floods. The tadpoles are grey in colour, with grey fins with light flecks. They are very large in size, up to 80 millimetres (3.1 in), take 3 to 11 months to develop, and are very slow-moving. They have been observed in clear water with a pH of 4.3 to 6.5 and a temperature range of 8.5 to 26.5 °C.

These frogs are difficult to find, and best seen at night after thunderstorm activity in the summer or after substantial rainfall.

== Conservation ==
This species has declined due to urbanisation and is mostly restricted to national parks and state forests.

First assessed by the International Union for the Conservation of Nature as a vulnerable species in 2002, its status has since been changed to endangered as of 2023.

Since July 2000 the frog has been as vulnerable under the Commonwealth EPBC Act, with another assessment due on 30 September 2021. As of 2021 it is listed as vulnerable in New South Wales under the Biodiversity Conservation Act 2016 (NSW) and threatened under the Flora and Fauna Guarantee Act 1988 (Vic). It is also Listed as Critically Endangered on the Advisory List of Threatened Vertebrate Fauna in Victoria (2013 list).

=== Captive breeding program ===
After a population of frogs was located by a PhD student in East Gippsland in August 2020, Zoos Victoria biologists managed to locate some tadpoles and took them back to Melbourne Zoo. The first captive breeding program for the giant burrowing frog is under way as of 2021, managed by Melbourne Zoo and the Arthur Rylah Institute.
