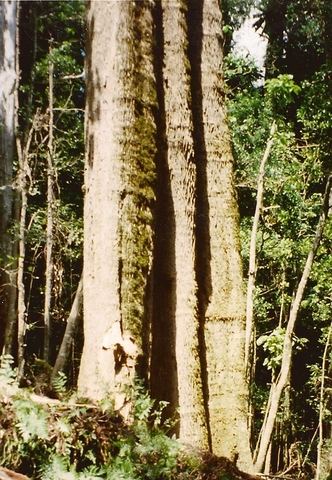
- At Allyn River, Barrington Tops, NSW

Scientific classification
- Kingdom: Plantae
- Clade: Tracheophytes
- Clade: Angiosperms
- Clade: Eudicots
- Clade: Asterids
- Order: Aquifoliales
- Family: Cardiopteridaceae
- Genus: Citronella
- Species: C. moorei

Binomial name
- Citronella moorei F.Muell. ex Benth. & R. A. Howard

Synonyms
- Villaresia moorei F.Muell.; Chariessa moorei, Engl.

= Citronella moorei =

Species of tree

Citronella moorei is a rainforest tree growing in eastern Australia. Common names for this species include churnwood, citronella, soapy box, silky beech, and corduroy. It is easily identified in the rainforest by the extraordinary twisting and crooked trunk.

== Description ==
Citronella moorei is a large tree attaining a height of 50 metres and a diameter of 2 m. The crown is dark green and dense. The bark is fawn or greyish, fissured and corky. The trunk is prominently and irregularly channelled, twisting or fluted. Often the trunk is leaning and crooked. It is rarely round except in very young trees.

Branchlets are moderately slender, green and smooth, while young shoots are finely downy. The leaves are alternate and simple, 5 to 10 cm long and 4 to 6 cm broad. They are not wavy edged, and drawn out to a blunt point. Old leaves turn black on the forest floor. Venation is prominent on both surfaces. The midrib and four to six lateral veins are raised, conspicuous and paler beneath.

C. moorei is dioecious, with male and female flowers on separate plants. The flowering period is from May to September, with creamy green flowers forming in narrow panicles.

The fruit is a black drupe, about 2 cm long. The outer part is moist and fleshy, while the inner part is hard. Fruit ripen from December to June. They are eaten by green catbird, topknot pigeon and wompoo fruit dove.

Removal of the fleshy aril is advised. Germination of sown fresh seed is slow, beginning after about six months and being complete after 8 to 14 months yielding a 100% success rate.

== Distribution and habitat ==
Growing on volcanic soils or rich alluvial soils in tropical, subtropical and warm temperate rainforests, it is common in sheltered valleys and slopes. Citronella moorei is found from the Clyde River, New South Wales (35° S) to Mossman, Queensland (16° S) in the tropics.

== Timber ==
The timber is pale grey, close grained with conspicuous rays. The sapwood is susceptible to borers.

== Gallery ==
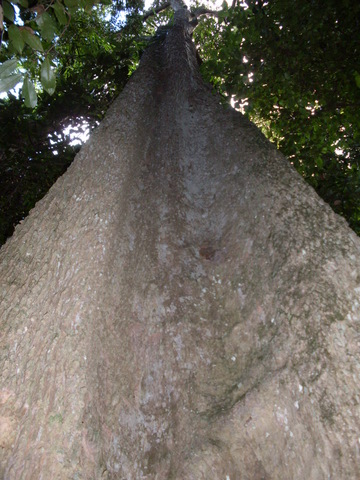
Citronella moorei growing by the Hacking River

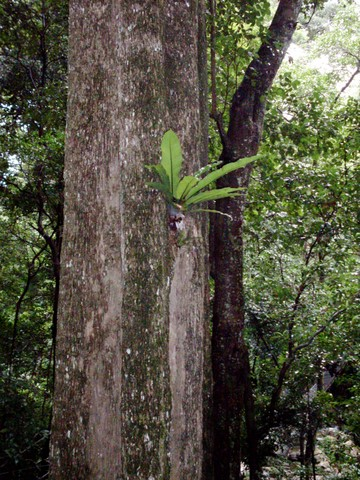
C. moorei growing by the Minnamurra River

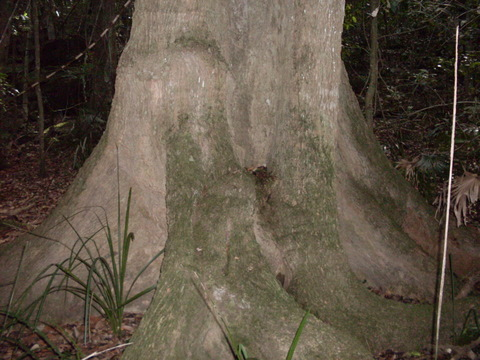
C. moorei growing by the Hacking River

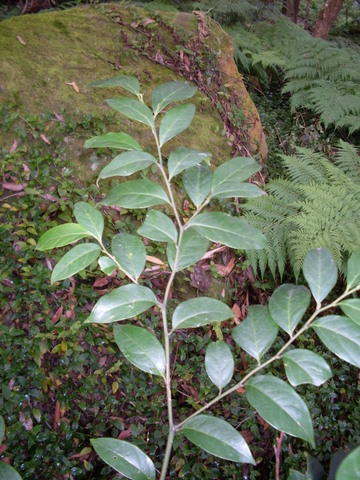
C. moorei juvenile
