= Helensburgh Glow Worm Tunnel =

Disused rail tunnel

Helensburgh Glow Worm tunnel
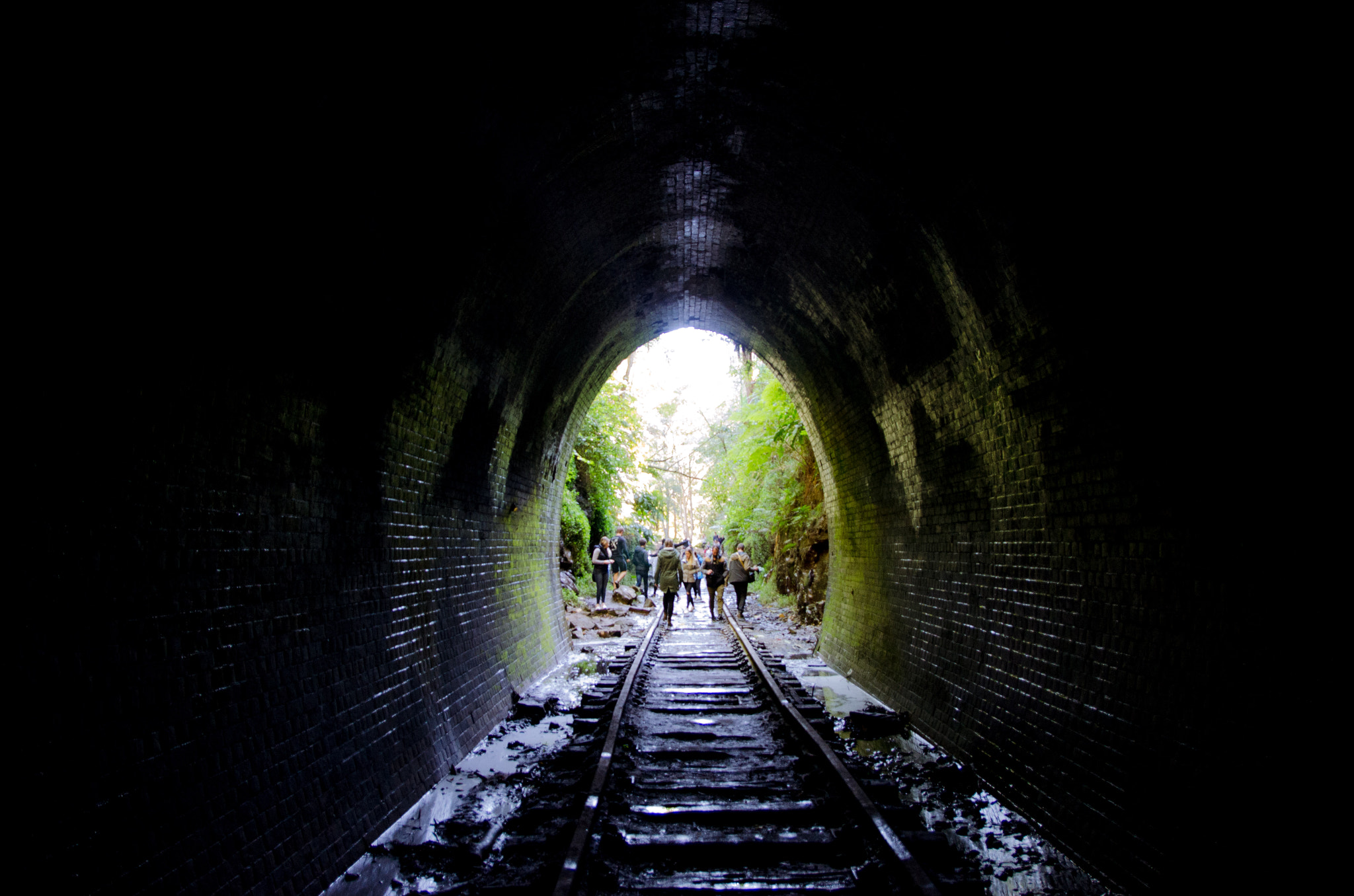
- Helensburgh Tunnel, in 2017
- Interactive map of Helensburgh Glow Worm tunnel

Overview
- Other names: Metropolitan tunnel; Tunnel No. 4
- Line: South Coast Line (subsequently deviated)
- Coordinates: 34°10′51″S 150°59′37″E

Operation
- Opened: 1 January 1889
- Closed: 1915 (as railway tunnels)
- Owner: Government of New South Wales
- Operator: Helensburgh Landcare

Technical
- Length: 624 metres (2,046 ft)
- Track gauge: 4 ft 8 1/2 in (1,435 mm) standard gauge

The Metropolitan Tunnel, also known as Helensburgh Glow Worm Tunnel, is a disused rail tunnel in Helensburgh, New South Wales. It is a popular tourist attraction due to its glow worm population.

It is considered crown land and managed by community group Helensburgh Landcare, who in early 2019, restricted access to the tunnel for the conservation of the glow worm colony.

== History ==
The Helensburgh Glow Worm tunnel was opened on 1 January 1889 and formed part of the town's first railway station. The original station was made up of two single-line tunnels; a short ‘Helensburgh tunnel’ that ran 80 metres (88 yd) in length; and the ‘Metropolitan tunnel’ which was 624 metres (682 yd) long. The latter is what is now locally known as the ‘Helensburgh Glow Worm tunnel’. The Metropolitan tunnel connected the local colliery to Helensburgh station as a way to transport mining produce uphill where it could be transported to suburbs to the north of Helensburgh.

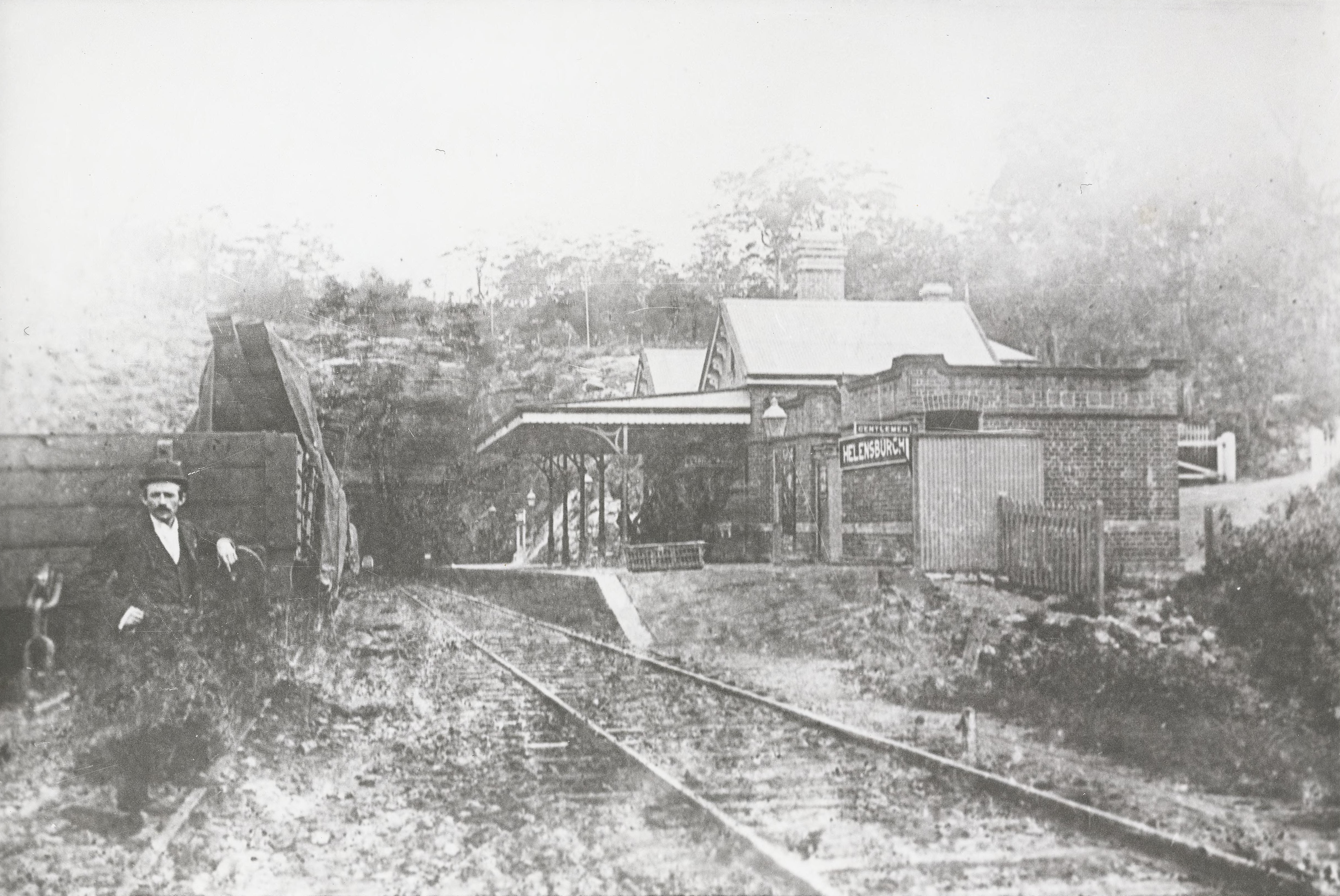
Old Helensburgh railway station, circa 1890–1905

The tunnels and station were closed in 1915 when the train line was duplicated and moved to combine and simplify the Sutherland to Wollongong journey; a necessity due to the increased coal mining operations from Helensburgh and down the South Coast. With the two tunnels no longer in use, the colliery turned the Metropolitan tunnel into a reservoir for mining purposes. In May 1928 a concrete plug was installed at the southern end of the tunnel which allowed the mine to control the water that would flood the tunnel from the northern end.

In April 1995, Metropolitan Colliery chose to clear years of debris and overgrowth at the northern entrance of the tunnel. After removing 2 metres (7 ft) of soil, several bricks from the original station platform were found. Helensburgh Landcare sought to excavate the site and was granted permission by the colliery to dig down to the original train track level.

In 2001, Helensburgh Landcare was awarded a Centenary of Federation grant allowing them to transform the site into a historical attraction. To recreate a realistic tunnel, the ground was laid with ballast and then parts of the original train track taken from the colliery side of the tunnel were put down in place of the original line. Landcare also restored what was left of the original ‘Helensburgh Station’ sign, found in a gully close to the area.

Over the years, the site became frequented by locals, historians, tourists, and photographers as well as colonies of glow worms. In 2012, the station sign was vandalised and removed, restored, and reinstalled in 2015. Within 18 months the sign was vandalised again.

In June 2018, a fence and gate were installed at the site in response to complaints made to the NSW Department of Industry, to discourage vandalism and destruction of the site and glow worm colony.

On 21 December 2018 a new reserve was issued by the NSW Government that marked the Metropolitan Tunnel and Helensburgh Tunnel had been set aside for "passive recreation, heritage purposes, environmental protection". Whilst Crown Lands retained ownership of the tunnels, this reserve appointed Helensburgh and District Landcare Group Inc as crown land managers, giving the group responsibility for the tunnels. Their first act as land management was to officially name the reserve, ‘Helensburgh Station Reserve’.

In early 2019, the group decided to close the Metropolitan Tunnel off from would-be visitors from 7 January to 3 February, by locking the fence and blocking access to the tunnel for conservation purposes.

=== Local superstitions ===
The Metropolitan and Helensburgh tunnels have become a popular attraction for those who believe in the paranormal. Some visitors report eerie feelings and supernatural encounters upon returning from either tunnel. These are purported to be related to the death of Robert Hails on 13 June 1895. Hails, a miner, died in a train tunnel after he was run over and split in two by a train whilst trying to pass through the tunnel on foot. It is unknown in which of the seven tunnels on the line the accident occurred, as multiple news sources were inconsistent when reporting the location of his demise.

On 15 June 1895, the local Illawarra Mercury reported on the trial:

The jury returned the following verdict – ‘That deceased came to his death by injuries accidentally received on the 13th of May through being run over by a passing train – No.67 – in No. 2 tunnel on the Illawarra line."

— Illawarra Mercury. 15 June 1895

At the time, the extended Helensburgh rail area had eight tunnels in total. The No. 2 tunnel was also known as the Cawley tunnel and is located to the north of the old Helensburgh station.

"He had stayed rather late in the township and on going home had to pass through the tunnel where the accident occurred."

The Cawley township was in the opposite direction of Hailes’ home in the suburb of Clifton. At the time, Cawley railway station was being used to receive goods for work on the railway and to deliver supplies to the colliery. The township of Cawley had begun to disappear in 1888 when the Cawley post office closed down. The reason for its closure was a lack of business; 7 years had passed since work had finished on that section of the line and workers had moved further down to work on the Otford and Clifton sections of the line. Although it is possible he was visiting a friend who remained in the township, there is speculation that Robert having died in the Cawley tunnel is incorrect.

There is reason to suggest that he may have travelled through either of the two Lilyvale tunnels, or the Metropolitan or Helensburgh tunnel. West Helensburgh had started to become a developed town which could have been a reason for him to go through the Metropolitan and Helensburgh tunnels. It is also argued that like many residents at the time, he may have used either of the two Lilyvale tunnels which lead to the neighbouring suburb of Bulgo. An article from The Australian Star, published on 14 June 1895 gives an alternate view of events to its Illawarra Mercury counterpart:

"A wire from Wollongong says: — News is just to hand of a train fatality which occurred in the first tunnel this side of Helensburgh this morning…"

— The Australian Star. 14 June 1895

offAs this news came from Wollongong, then "this side of Helensburgh" would refer only to tunnels south of Helensburgh; which would discount the Cawley tunnel. Interpretations of this may mean any of the four tunnels aforementioned. Another article by the South Australian Chronicle, published on 15 June 1895 stated:

“He had apparently gone to sleep on the line in a short tunnel as he was returning home late last night from work.”

— South Australian Chronicle. 15 June 1895

Local historians believe ‘short tunnel’ would imply that he either met his death in the Lilyvale tunnel or the Helensburgh tunnel, which are both 80 metres in length. However, ‘short’ is relative and it remains a mystery as to the true location of Hailes' death place. Out of these conflicting reports, a local legend that one can hear the footsteps of Robert Hailes trying to outrun the trains was conceived. The main Metropolitan tunnel and its companion the Helensburgh tunnel have since become a great source for ghost-tour operators in the south coast.

== Glow worms ==
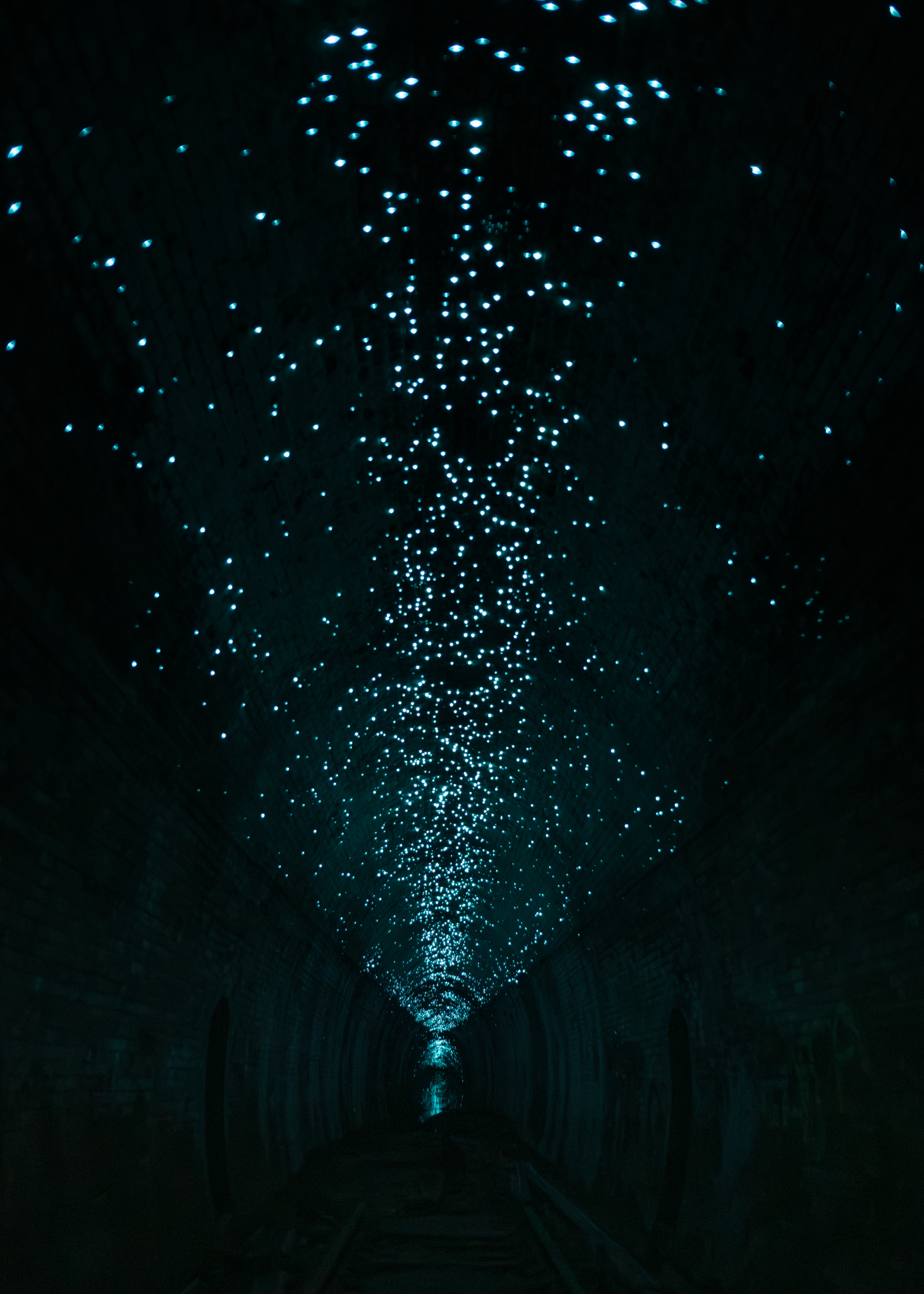
Glow worms in the tunnel

After the Metropolitan Tunnel was restored, a colony of glow worms began to inhabit the inner part of the 24-metre (79 ft) stretch of excavated tunnel. These glow worms, also known as Fungus Gnats are famous for their bioluminescence. It is the blue-green light that the worms emit, that attracts many visitors to the tunnel. It is also this light that lures the glow worm's prey – small invertebrates, for example, mosquitoes.

In June 2018 a fence was constructed at the base of the entrance to the old station by Don Campbell and Norm Purdy after "The [NSW Department of Industry] received reports of damage to heritage items on the platform, and there are concerns about the impact of light, noise, and pollution on the glow worms in the tunnel,".

The glow-worm populations have been reduced in recent years by spectators of the tunnel, interrupting the worms feeding processes by visitors’ beaming flashlights onto the roof of the tunnel, sending up flares and firecrackers for photography purposes, and graffitiing the inner tunnel wall. Access to the tunnels is at the discretion of the Helensburgh Landcare group. The group blocked the entrance to the tunnel for four weeks in January 2019 during the breeding season in an effort to allow the glow worm population to recover from years of poor treatment. When the gate is locked, trespassers who enter the tunnel may be liable for prosecution under the Inclosed Lands Protection Act (NSW) 1901.

== See also ==
- South Coast railway line, New South Wales
  - Otford railway tunnel
- Lithgow Glow Worm Tunnel
