= Helensburgh railway station =

Railway station in New South Wales, Australia

Helensburgh
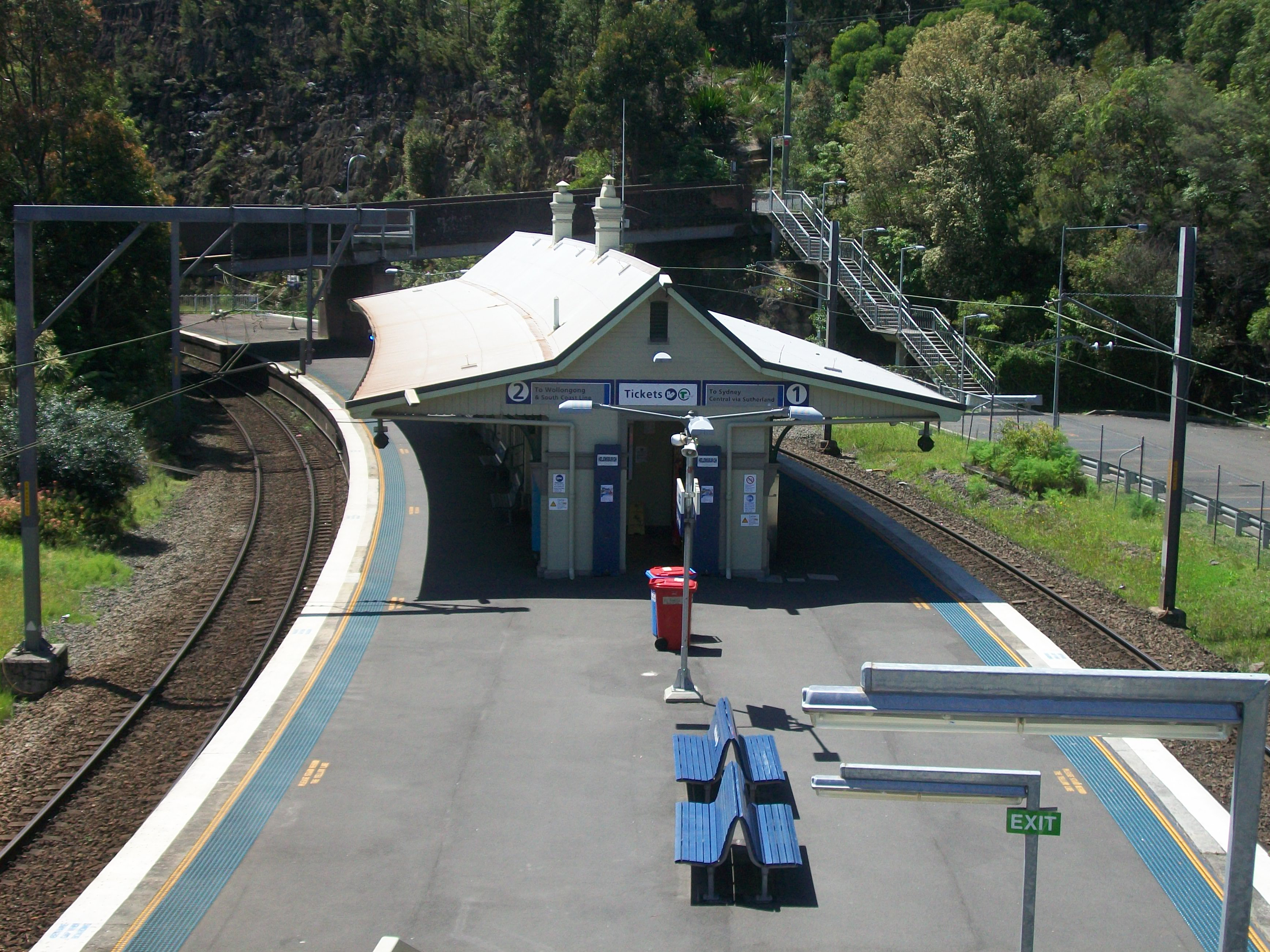
- Southbound view of the station platforms from the footbridge, January 2008

General information
- Location: Tunnel Road, Helensburgh, New South Wales; Australia
- Coordinates: 34°10′37″S 150°59′41″E
- Elevation: 149 metres (489 ft)
- Owner: Transport Asset Manager of New South Wales
- Operator: Sydney Trains
- Line: South Coast
- Distance: 46.38 kilometres (28.82 mi) from Central
- Platforms: 2 (1 island)
- Tracks: 2
- Connections: Bus

Construction
- Structure type: Ground
- Accessible: Yes

Other information
- Status: Weekdays: Staffed: 5.35am to 9.15pm: Weekends and public holidays: Staffed: 7am to 3pm
- Station code: HSB
- Website: Transport for NSW

History
- Opened: 1889
- Rebuilt: 1915

Passengers
- 2025: 207,103 (year); 567 (daily) (Sydney Trains)
- Rank: 188

Services
Preceding station	Intercity Trains	Following station
Otford towards Kiama or Port Kembla	South Coast Line	Waterfall towards Central or Bondi Junction
Thirroul towards Kiama	South Coast Line	Waterfall Limited express towards Central or Bondi Junction
Thirroul towards Kiama	South Coast Line Express	Sutherland towards Central or Bondi Junction
Former services
Preceding station	Former services	Following station
Lilyvale towards Bomaderry	South Coast Line (1890–1983)	Waterfall towards Sydney

New South Wales Heritage Register
- Official name: Helensburgh Railway Station Group
- Type: State heritage (complex / group)
- Designated: 2 April 1999
- Reference no.: 01168
- Type: Railway Platform / Station
- Category: Transport – Rail
Location

Helensburgh railway station is a heritage-listed railway station located on the South Coast railway line in New South Wales, Australia. It serves the town of Helensburgh. It was added to the New South Wales State Heritage Register on 2 April 1999.

== History ==
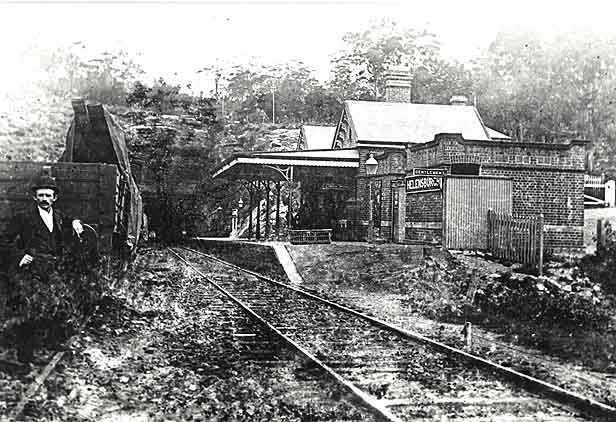
The original Helensburgh station.

Helensburgh was first known as "Camp Creek". It began as a tent town of railway workers who were constructing the Illawarra railway line. Explanations for the choice of the name "Helensburgh" include that the town was named after Helensburgh in Scotland, birthplace of the Cumberland Coal Mine's manager, Charles Harper; or that the town was named after Harper's daughter, Helen.

Helensburgh's first station opened in 1889 as the single line from Sutherland was progressively extended south towards Stanwell Park. It was built between the short Helensburgh Tunnel and the longer Metropolitan Tunnel to service the local Helensburgh township. A new site opened on 30 May 1915 when the line was duplicated and new tunnels were constructed between Waterfall and Otford. The first Helensburgh Station was built in 1889 on the first single line section of the Illawarra Railway, opening from Waterfall to Scarborough in 1888. This section of the line thereby provided a continuous line as far as Bombo by connecting up with the previously isolated section of line.

Early train operations from Clifton (Scarborough) to Waterfall required 8 tunnels penetrating ridges with high embankments between. Two of these tunnels, the Otford railway tunnel and the Metropolitan tunnel, were notorious for hot and suffocating conditions experienced by the crew of steam trains climbing to Waterfall from Thirroul. There were cases of enginemen burnt by the heat. Due to these conditions, the single line section became an operational bottleneck. To negotiate the steep terrain, train loads were reduced by up to 50% of capacity.

In order to provide a duplicated railway as far as Wollongong it was necessary to plan an entirely new section of the line that started at South Waterfall and ended at Lilyvale. Work commenced in 1914 to eliminate the original single line route south of Waterfall with its steep grades and poorly ventilated tunnels. Deviations requiring massive earthworks were built for a less severely graded double track, and this project was known as the "Helensburgh Deviation". Completion of the project was accomplished in 1920 when the worst of the tunnels (the Otford tunnel) was bypassed.

This project resulted in the construction of the present Helensburgh Railway Station, on a different site from the original Helensburgh Railway Station, which opened in 1915. The original Helensburgh and Metropolitan Tunnels, as well as remnants of the former Helensburgh Station platform remain southwest of the present station. The land is now no longer in RailCorp ownership and has been vested to the NSW Department of Lands.

Helensburgh Railway Station has an island platform with a standard brick single storey building being one of the longest of its type, the signal box section now being used as a waiting room. To the east is a brick and steel overbridge that originally connected the platform by way of a steel and pre-cast concrete footbridge and stairs.

Helensburgh became the temporary terminus of the electrified line when it opened from Waterfall on 6 May 1984. Electrification was extended through to Port Kembla in January 1986.

In 2007, at the western end of the platform, a reinforced concrete footbridge was built over the "down" line with stairs and lifts connecting between the platform and the car park on the southern side of the station. The staircase to the Wilsons Creek Road overpass was removed at this time.

== Platforms and services ==
Helensburgh has one island platform with two faces and is serviced by Sydney Trains South Coast line services travelling between Sydney Central, Bondi Junction and Kiama. It is also the terminating point for one weekday afternoon Sydney Trains service that is extended from Waterfall primarily to convey school students.

Platform	Line	Stopping pattern	Notes
1	T4	Service to Bondi Junction	One weekday service
1	SCO	Services to Waterfall, Sydney Central and Bondi Junction	
2	SCO	Services to Thirroul, Port Kembla and Kiama	

== Transport links ==
Premier Charters operates one route via Helensburgh station, under contract to Transport for NSW:

- 15: to Stanwell Park station via Helensburgh CBD.

== Description ==
The station complex includes the platform building, platform and Park Street overbridge, all completed in 1915, and the footbridge, completed in 2007.

Helensburgh Railway Station is virtually identical to Scarborough, however at Helensburgh both the platform and the platform building are slightly curved. The station is entered via a modern footbridge (2007) from the car park on the southern side of the station. The platform and platform building have their long axes east–west. The station is located in a bushland setting at the bottom of a valley.

Platform Building (1915)

There is a single painted brick island platform building, curved to follow the curve of the platform, with a gabled corrugated steel roof and skillion corrugated steel awning roofs on both sides. The building has two painted brick chimneys with pairs of unglazed terracotta chimney pots. There are rectangular timber vents to the gable ends of the building. The building features original timber framed double hung windows with 9-paned top sashes with coloured glass panes. The bottom sashes are 2-paned, one of the panes being coloured glass. Awnings on both sides of the platform building are cantilevered on steel brackets mounted on decorative sandstone brackets. There are timber valances to both ends of each awning.

The waiting area is at the western end of the building, and has previously been the location of the signal box. The interior of the waiting area is original, with a ripple iron ceiling with metal ceiling rose, moulded plaster chair rail, and a chimney breast (fireplace removed). The Station Master's office also has original internal fitout, with a ripple iron ceiling with metal ceiling rose and a moulded plaster chair rail, and chimney breast (no fireplace). Internal doors are original timber 4-panel doors.

Footbridge (2007)

A modern footbridge with stairs and lifts which provides platform access from the southern side of the line only.

Park Street Overbridge (1915)

Jack arch bridge with brick balustrade. Anti-throw steel screen installed.

Platform (1915)

A curved island platform with brick edges, with evidence of extension of the platform and of the previous signal application. Asphalt surface.

Landscape/Natural Features

Helensburgh Railway Station is located in a bushland setting at the bottom of a valley, within a railway cutting.

Condition

The platform building, platform and Park Street overbridge were all reported to be in good condition as at 25 June 2009.

Helensburgh Railway Station is remarkably intact. The platform building is remarkably intact externally (one doorway bricked up, security screens added), and internally (booking office waiting room and Station Master's office/booking office generally intact).

== Heritage listing ==
Helensburgh Railway Station – including its 1915 platform, platform building and Park Street overbridge is of historical significance for its role as a transport hub for Helensburgh since 1915. The rebuilding of Helensburgh Railway Station in 1915 is historically associated with the construction of the "Helensburgh Deviation" a massive NSW Railways construction project undertaken from 1914–1920 to eliminate the original single Illawarra line route south of Waterfall with its steep grades and poorly ventilated tunnels. Helensburgh Railway Station is of aesthetic significance for the unique curve of its platform and platform building, its bushland setting, and the fine quality of its representative Federation period platform building.

Helensburgh railway station was listed on the New South Wales State Heritage Register on 2 April 1999 having satisfied the following criteria.

The place is important in demonstrating the course, or pattern, of cultural or natural history in New South Wales.

The rebuilding of Helensburgh Railway Station in 1915 is historically associated with the construction of the "Helensburgh Deviation" a massive NSW Railway construction project undertaken 1914–1920 to eliminate the original single Illawarra line route south of Waterfall with its steep grades and poorly ventilated tunnels. Helensburgh Railway Station is also of local historical significance for its role as a transport hub for Helensburgh since 1915.

The place is important in demonstrating aesthetic characteristics and/or a high degree of creative or technical achievement in New South Wales.

Helensburgh Railway Station is of aesthetic significance for the unique curve of its platform and platform building, its bushland setting, and the fine quality of its Federation period platform building.

The place has strong or special association with a particular community or cultural group in New South Wales for social, cultural or spiritual reasons.

The place has the potential to contribute to the local community's sense of place, and can provide a connection to the local community's past.

The place possesses uncommon, rare or endangered aspects of the cultural or natural history of New South Wales.

The curve of the platform and platform building at Helensburgh is rare, and the landscape setting of the station unusual, however Helensburgh Railway Station is otherwise not rare (one of 12 stations on the Illawarra line with this type of brick platform building).

The place is important in demonstrating the principal characteristics of a class of cultural or natural places/environments in New South Wales.

Helensburgh Railway Station is a fine representative railway station with an early standard brick platform building, of which there are 12 examples on the Illawarra line (other examples at Banksia, Bulli, Carlton, Coledale, Erskineville, Kiama, Mortdale, Rockdale, Scarborough, Sydenham and Wollongong). The platform building at Scarborough is virtually identical to the platform building at Helensburgh, though that at Helensburgh is unique in being curved.

== See also ==
- List of regional railway stations in New South Wales
- Helensburgh Glow Worm Tunnel
