= Black Christmas bushfires =

Series of fires in 2001–2002 in New South Wales

Coordinates: 33°47′01″S 151°08′19″E

- Date: 24 December 2001 – 7 January 2002
- Location: New South Wales, Australia

Statistics
- Burned area: 753,314 hectares (1,861,480 acres)
- Land use: Urban/rural fringe areas; Farmland; Forest reserves

Impacts
- Deaths: Nil
- Injuries: 4
- Structures destroyed: 109 homes; 433 outbuildings
- Cost: A$70 million

Ignition
- Cause: Low humidity; Arson

In Australia, during winter and spring 2001, low rainfall across combined with a hot, dry December created ideal conditions for bushfires. On the day of Christmas Eve, firefighters from the Grose Vale Rural Fire Service (RFS) brigade attended a blaze in rugged terrain at the end of Cabbage Tree Rd, Grose Vale, believed to have been caused by power lines in the Grose Valley.

On Christmas Day, strong westerly winds fuelled more than 100 bushfires across the state, creating a plume of smoke that extended across Sydney. This plume of smoke would not clear for some days as the bushfires continued to burn, creating some of the worst pollution that Sydney has ever experienced, with a regional pollution index reading of: 200 in North-West Sydney; 120 in Central-East and South-West Sydney. The fires mainly burnt in Lane Cove National Park, the Royal National Park and Blue Mountains National Park. Approximately 753,314 hectares (1,861,480 acres) was burnt. 121 homes were destroyed across the state and 36 damaged, mostly in the lower Blue Mountains and west of the Royal National Park around Helensburgh. Arsonists were believed to be responsible for starting many of the fires, leading to harsher penalties for those who start bushfires.

The dry conditions that started the bushfires continued well into 2002, resulting in the worst drought in 100 years. The drought was declared a "one in 1000 year event". The drought finally broke with the La Nina event of 2010–2011. Significantly higher than average rainfall began in July 2010, it was Australia's second wettest year on record.

An Erickson S-64 Aircrane helicopter became something of a celebrity during this time. Elvis (N179AC) was loaned to NSW by Victoria and proved instantly successful.

Start date	Injuries	Houses destroyed	Area		Local government areas	Impacted communities and description of damage	Duration
Start date	Injuries	Houses destroyed	ha	acre	Local government areas	Impacted communities and description of damage	Duration
24 December 2001		30 – 39	15,500	38,000	Wollondilly	—Belimba Park, Nattai, Oakdale, Silverdale, Thirlmere & Warragamba 8 factory buildings, 2 shops and dozens of other non-residential structures destroyed.	43 days
24 December 2001		34 – 52	97,000	240,000	Shoalhaven	—Bendalong, Berrara, Huskisson, Manyana, Sussex Inlet, Tomerong & Vincentia 5 industrial units, 21 businesses, 109 sheds, one scout hall, 53 vehicles, 11 tractors, 23 other items of farm equipment, 25 trailers, 21 boats and 580 beehives destroyed.	29 days
23 December 2001		2	45,500	112,000	Clarence Valley	—Brooms Head 12 non-residential structures destroyed. 8 houses damaged.	22 days
24 December 2001	4	14	112,000	280,000	Hawkesbury	—Yarramundi & Blaxlands Ridge Several non-residential structures destroyed.	31 days
24 December 2001		12	42,000	100,000	Blue Mountains	—Warrimoo, Valley Heights & Yellow Rock 8 houses damaged.	20 days
25 December 2001		27 – 35	64,000	160,000	Sutherland & Wollongong	—Heathcote, Waterfall, Helensburgh, Otford & Stanwell Tops 20 or more vehicles, 15 industrial premises, 14 commercial premises, 5 cottages, 2 large conference buildings and dozens of other non-residential structures destroyed. Scores of houses damaged.	14 days
25 December 2001		4	8,200	20,000	Penrith	—Glenmore Park & Mulgoa	6 days

== See also ==
- 2001 Warragamba bushfires
