= Stanwell Tops =

Coordinates: 34°13′12″S 150°59′31″E

- Suburb
- Country: Australia
- State: New South Wales
- City: Wollongong
- LGA: City of Wollongong
- Location: 57 km (35 mi) SW of Sydney; 33 km (21 mi) N of Wollongong

Government
  - State electorate: Heathcote
  - Federal division: Cunningham
- Elevation: 275 m (902 ft)

Population
  - Total: 517 (2021 census)
- Postcode: 2508
Suburbs around Stanwell Tops
Helensburgh	Helensburgh	Otford
Appin	Stanwell Tops	Stanwell Park
Cataract	Coalcliff	Stanwell Park

Stanwell Tops is an exurban locality between the cities of Sydney and Wollongong on the New South Wales, Australia coastline. It lies northwest of Stanwell Park and southwest of Otford.

== Demography ==
With a population of 517 residents Stanwell Tops is almost entirely residential. In 1996 Australian Bureau of Statistics data reported Stanwell Tops as having the fourth-highest proportion of males in the state at 59.4%, however by 2011 Stanwell Tops had lost its outlier status with that percentage figure dropping to 51.8%. The population of Stanwell Tops decreased from 545 to 471 between 1996 and 2011, indicating a loss of 13.6% of its residents.

In the 2021 Census, 86.3% of people were born in Australia and 94.4% of people spoke only English at home. The most common responses for religion were No Religion 37.7%, Catholic 20.3% and Anglican 16.2%. Stanwell park had a few close shops to Stanwell Tops. Helensburgh is the main town out of Coalcliff, Otford, Stanwell Park, and Stanwell Tops because they have the same post code as the main town, Helensburgh.

== Economy ==
There are no retail stores or industrial facilities in Stanwell Tops. Groceries, liquor, public hotels and some restaurants can be found in the surrounding towns and villages less than 10 minutes drive away. The majority of residents work either in the Greater Sydney area or in the Wollongong metropolitan area, and the proportion of households whose income is above A$3000 per week is more than double the Australian national average.

Businesses that operate in Stanwell Tops are the 'Tumbling Waters Retreat', 'The Tops Conference Centre' (formerly known as the Christian Conference Centre, a wholly owned subsidiary of Churches of Christ Community Care), 'Stanwell Tops Technical Services' and several hobby farms – some with farmstay options. At least one hang gliding businesses operates from Bald Hill, which is technically a part of Stanwell Tops.

== Geography ==
Stanwell Tops rests on the Illawarra escarpment, overlooking the Pacific Ocean and the neighbouring village of Stanwell Park. It is bounded on all sides by state-forest reserves and other forested crown lands, which are contiguous with the Royal National Park and the Garawarra State Conservation Area.

== History ==
Stanwell Tops has its origins as a private parcel of land owned by property developer Henry Ferdinand Halloran. Since the 1930s, the area had been host to health retreats, recreational facilities, and popular bushwalking tracks.

The Stanwell Tops Pleasure Park complex operated during the 1930s and 1940s and evolved into a caravan park, until it was shut down in 1951 due to stagnating business. At the same time, the majority of the site was subdivided and sold, creating the permanent community that exists today. The site of the dance hall, the only remaining building of the former Pleasure Park, remained unused until it was sold in 1970 to a private owner who renamed the property and the accompanying mineral pools as the 'Garden of Peace', a meditation retreat and de facto community centre. At the turn of the century, the site was sold again and in 2003 opened as the boutique hotel and function centre 'Tumbling Waters Retreat'.

At the same time as the original Pleasure Park, the Princess Marina Cliff Walk was established; also by Henry Halloran. The walk extended throughout the surrounding bushlands and is still largely intact. Another walking track, the Wodi Wodi trail, links Stanwell Tops with Stanwell Park railway station.

=== Indigenous history ===
Stanwell Tops is a part of the Aboriginal land formerly occupied by the Tharawal people, specifically the Wodi Wodi clan.

=== Recent history ===
==== Black Christmas 2001 ====
On 25 December 2001, Stanwell Tops and Helensburgh were the sites of the most dangerous bushfire to reach the area in living memory. The fire affected the entire population of both localities, with 12 homes and two businesses destroyed and more damaged. Helensburgh residents were issued with a general evacuation order. The immediate fire danger lasted from midday on 25 December until midnight. Helensburgh was still closed for the next three days due to the health hazard associated with a malfunctioning electricity grid, and sewage and water systems, which were also damaged in the fire.

Local community groups remarked on the solidarity of residents during the crisis, particularly in helping to preserve property; however opinions of the actions of authorities were mixed. An official inquiry found that fire originated from powerlines operated by Integral Energy, and that the company was liable for compensation claims made by residents of affected homes and businesses.

In 2008, five Helensburgh firefighters who responded to the Black Christmas bushfires were awarded bravery medals and meritorious conduct awards by the NSW Fire Brigades, as well as a Commissioner's Commendation for their courageous efforts during both the Black Christmas bushfires and the Waterfall rail accident.

==== Development controversies ====
The nearby town of Helensburgh has been the subject of numerous proposals, beginning in the early 1970s, for expanded urban development. Since then, various additions to the township have moved its effective boundary closer to Stanwell Tops; however, development that would increase the urban footprint of Stanwell Tops itself has not been approved.

More recent proposals that included plans for expanding Stanwell Tops as well as Helensburgh and Otford were submitted to Wollongong City Council from 2004 onwards. Proposals to rezone Environmentally Protected '7(d)' zones in 2010 and 2011 were met with large-scale community opposition.

== See also ==
- Stanwell Park
- Helensburgh
- Wollongong
- Sydney
- Commuter Town
- Rural-urban fringe
- Peri-urbanisation
- Lower middle class
- Upper middle class
- Australian Dream
- Cultural cringe
