= Lilyvale railway tunnels =

- Location within New South Wales Location within Australia
- 34.1892°S 151.0032°E
- Location: Illawarra railway, Lilyvale, City of Wollongong, New South Wales, Australia

Site notes
- Architect: NSW Government Railways
- Owner: Transport Asset Manager of New South Wales

New South Wales Heritage Register
- Official name: Lilyvale railway tunnels
- Type: state heritage (built)
- Designated: 2 April 1999
- Reference no.: 1179
- Type: Railway Tunnel
- Category: Transport – Rail
- Builders: N.S.W. Government Railways

Lilyvale railway tunnels are heritage-listed railway tunnels on the Illawarra railway line at Lilyvale, City of Wollongong, New South Wales, Australia. It was designed and built by the then-New South Wales Government Railways. The property is owned by Transport Asset Manager, an agency of the Government of New South Wales. It was added to the New South Wales State Heritage Register on 2 April 1999.

== History ==
The difficult geological formation of the Illawarra escarpment created many problems for the railway engineers and contractors in building the single line from Waterfall railway station to the (Old) Stanwell Park station so that when it opened in 1888 it was nearly two years after the opening of the southern part of the line to Bombo.

This difficult section of terrain resulted in the construction of six tunnels of varying length of which nearly all were abandoned in 1915 when a new double track deviation line (the "Helensburgh Deviation") was built from just south of Waterfall to Coalcliff.

The two southern tunnels at Lilyvale are known as Tunnels No 5 and 6. Tunnel 5 has since been vested to the Department of Lands. The two tunnels are used to provide road access to the west of the line.

The 1915 double track tunnel is known as the Deviation Tunnel and remains in use today.

In 1986, the line was electrified as far as Wollongong, necessitating the installation of new electrical infrastructure within the 1915 tunnel.

== Description ==
The precinct contains two tunnels: the disused original 1888 tunnel, now known as the Lilyvale Road Access Tunnel, and the 1915 tunnel, which remains in use as the Lilyvale Railway Tunnel.

The tunnels are located southeast of Helensburgh, west of Lady Wakehurst Drive.

Lilyvale Road Access Tunnel (1888)

The original tunnel is of a single line brick oviform construction. The tunnel in still used for service road access (known as Road Access Tunnel Number 2) on the rail system and retains all of its entry detail and interior curved brick walls in both plan form and in section.

Lilyvale Railway Tunnel (1915)

This is a semi-circular arched double line brick tunnel with brick buttresses and a sandstone keystone to the centre of the arch.

Other nearby related elements

A further 1888 road access tunnel (Number 1) is located further west of the two tunnels and is now owned by the Department of Lands. An easement for road access is current across the site.

The tunnels were in good condition at the time of their heritage listing and appear largely intact.

== Heritage listing ==
The two Lilyvale Railway tunnels are of State significance for their ability to clearly demonstrate the two significant periods of construction of the Illawarra Line. The original 1888 tunnel, now used for road access, remains largely intact and is located adjacent to the 1915 railway tunnel which was built as part of the Helensburgh deviation, to bypass the steep and difficult tunnels built in 1888 in this section of the Illawarra line. The two tunnels side by side demonstrate the changing needs of the railway system and the skills and technology available during two different periods. As such, the two tunnels are an important reference site demonstrating changes in railway construction engineering and design during the late 19th and early 20th century.

Lilyvale railway tunnels was listed on the New South Wales State Heritage Register on 2 April 1999 having satisfied the following criteria.

The place is important in demonstrating the course, or pattern, of cultural or natural history in New South Wales.

The two Lilyvale railway tunnels are significant for their ability to clearly demonstrate the two significant periods of construction of the Illawarra Line. The original 1888 tunnel, now used for road access, remains largely intact and is located adjacent to the 1915 railway tunnel which was built as part of the Helensburgh deviation, to bypass the steep and difficult tunnels built in 1888 in this section of the Illawarra line. The two tunnels side by side demonstrate the changing needs of the railway system and the skills and technology available during two different periods.

The place is important in demonstrating aesthetic characteristics and/or a high degree of creative or technical achievement in New South Wales.

Both tunnels are of technical and aesthetic significance for their ability to demonstrate railway tunnel technology of their period, demonstrating a high level of trademanship in the quality of the brickwork. The setting of the 1888 tunnel in the natural landscape also evokes a picturesque ruinous setting.

The place has potential to yield information that will contribute to an understanding of the cultural or natural history of New South Wales.

The two tunnels are an important reference site demonstrating changes in railway construction engineering and design during the late 19th and early 20th century.

The place is important in demonstrating the principal characteristics of a class of cultural or natural places/environments in New South Wales.

The two tunnels are representative of railway engineering from their respective periods.

== See also ==
- List of railway tunnels in New South Wales
