= Lilyvale, New South Wales =

Lilyvale Wollongong, New South Wales
- Coordinates: 34°11′S 151°01′E
- Population: 11 (2021 census)
- Postcode(s): 2508
- LGA(s): Wollongong
- State electorate(s): Heathcote
- Federal division(s): Hughes
Localities around Lilyvale:
| Cawley | Waterfall | Waterfall |
| Helensburgh | Lilyvale | Garawarra |
| Helensburgh | Otford | Otford |

Lilyvale is a locality in New South Wales on the northern periphery of the Wollongong local government area, south of Sydney. Most of the locality is now in the Royal National Park and Garawarra State Conservation Area. The former Lilyvale village centre, which at one stage had a population of about 200 people, was at Lilyvale railway station (1890 to 1989) on the South Coast railway between Helensburgh and Otford.

== History ==
Aboriginal peoples, the latest being the Wodi Wodi people, once lived over the area. Its steep gullies and rainforest made it difficult going terrain. Cedar cutters reached the area well ahead of colonial settlement. Lilyvale became an isolated rural area at the north of the Bulgo Valley along the Hacking River. The village began in 1884 as a railway construction camp and then served the Metropolitan Colliery, a timber mill at what is now Karingal Flat in the Royal National Park, associated railway sidings, cattle grazing and orchard farms. The railway opened through Lilyvale in 1888 and a railway station was opened at Lilyvale on 1 October 1889. The Metropolitan Hotel was situated above Lilyvale railway station. Town subdivisions were laid out above Lilyvale railway station and on Karingal Flat below. Lilyvale Post Office opened on 1 October 1898 and closed in 1931. On 4 January 1909, a bushfire burnt-out most of the village and many surrounding farms. The village and locality were briefly revitalised by the re-alignment and duplication of the railway line from 1914 to 1920 and became a depression camp in the 1930s. Garawarra Park, a 526ha area of Crown land to the east of the Hacking River was declared in 1934 and became a southern extension of the Royal National Park in 1967. What remained of Lilyvale village and outlying farms of Lilyvale were devastated by bushfires in 1952. Lilyvale Mushrooms operated in the two abandoned railway tunnels between Lilyvale and Metropolitan Colliery from 1952 to the late 1970s. Much of the surrounding colliery land, once used for forestry and farms was resumed and became Garawarra State Conservation Area in 1987. The railway station, footbridge and nearby vehicle bridge over the railway were destroyed by the government railway authority in 1989.

== Heritage listings ==
Lilyvale has a number of heritage-listed sites, including:

- Illawarra railway: Lilyvale railway tunnels
- Royal National Park: Coastal Cabin Communities
