= Otford railway tunnel =

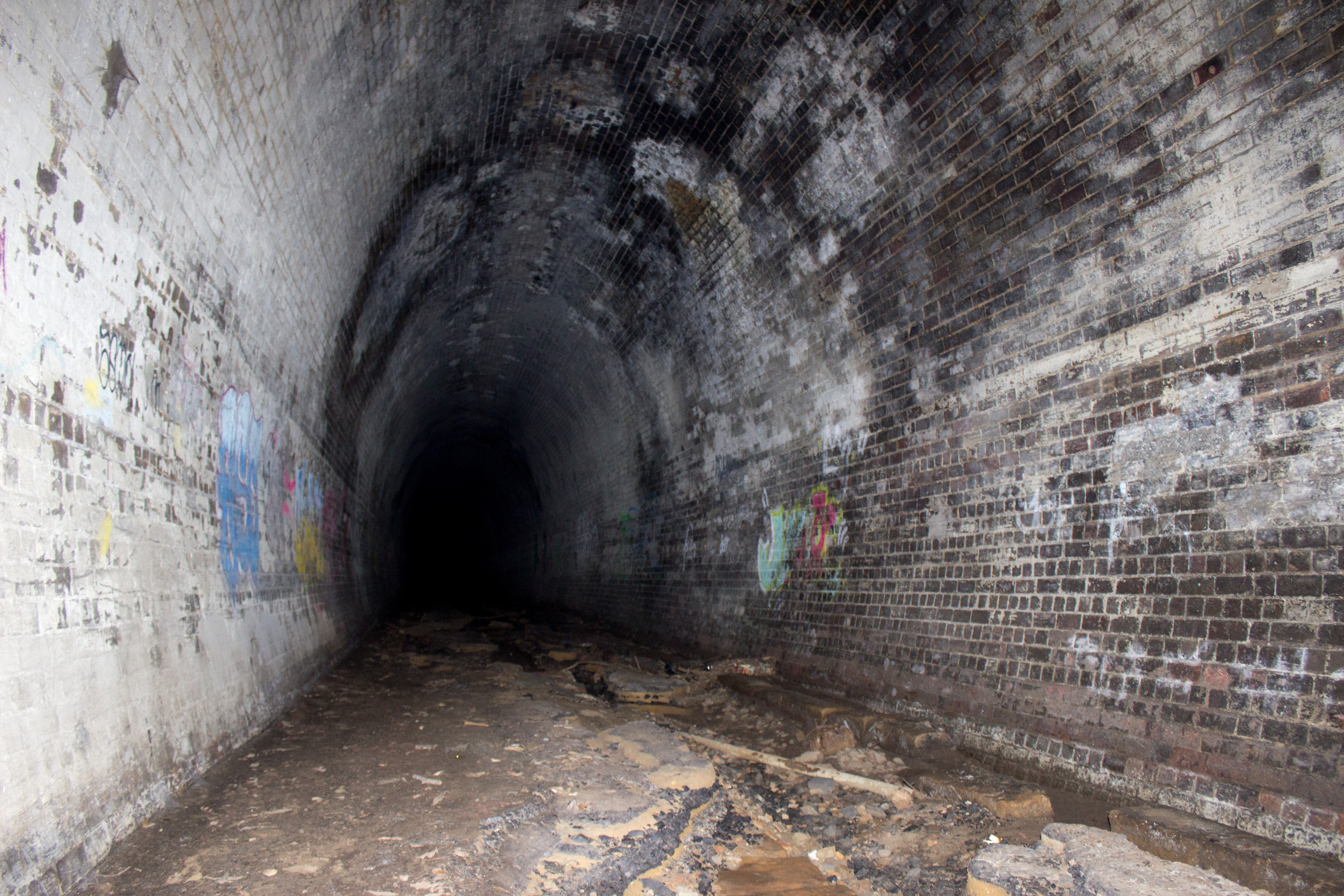
- View inside
- Interactive map of Otford railway tunnel

Overview
- Location: Illawarra railway, Otford, City of Wollongong, New South Wales, Australia
- Coordinates: 34°12′48″S 151°00′01″E; 34°13′14″S 150°59′52″E; 34°13′19″S 150°59′50″E; 34°13′32″S 150°59′43″E
- Status: heritage
- Start: Otford
- End: Stanwell Park

Operation
- Opened: 1888
- Closed: 1915

Technical
- Length: 78 chains (5,100 ft; 1,600 m)
- Track gauge: 4 ft 8 1/2 in (1,435 mm) standard gauge
- Max elevation: 105 metres (344 ft)
- Min elevation: 60 metres (197 ft)
- Grade: 1:40 (2.5 %)

Site notes
- Architect: NSW Government Railway
- Owner: Transport Asset Manager of New South Wales

New South Wales Heritage Register
- Official name: Otford railway tunnel (former)
- Type: state heritage (built)
- Designated: 2 April 1999
- Reference no.: 1219
- Type: Railway Tunnel
- Category: Transport – Rail
- Builders: Tunnel – W. Rowe & W. Smith, Vent shaft – Mr. McDonald

The Otford railway tunnel is a heritage-listed former railway tunnel on the Illawarra railway line at Otford, City of Wollongong, New South Wales, Australia. It was designed by the New South Wales Government Railways, and built by W. Rowe and W. Smith (tunnel) and Mr. McDonald (vent shaft). The property was added to the New South Wales State Heritage Register on 2 April 1999.

== History ==
The Otford Railway Tunnel was constructed in 1888 by the firm Rowe and Smith, who built seven of the eight original tunnels on the Illawarra line from Waterfall to Clifton. The Otford Railway Tunnel, the seventh after Waterfall, was the final major engineering project which permitted the linking up of the northern part of the Illawarra Line to the isolated southern part in 1888. The Otford Railway Tunnel opened on 3 October 1888. The single line connection was made at (old) Stanwell Park Station (now bypassed by the 1915 Stanwell Park Deviation).

The tunnel was built of brick arched form and when built was the largest and steepest (5,985 feet or 1,824 metres long and 1 in 40 gradient) on the system.

Of the eight original tunnels in the Waterfall to Clifton section of the Illawarra line, the Otford tunnel and the Metropolitan tunnel were notorious for hot and suffocating conditions experienced by the crew of steam trains climbing to Waterfall from Thirroul. There were cases of enginemen burnt by the heat. Due to these conditions, the single line section became an operational bottleneck. To negotiate the steep terrain, train loads were reduced by up to 50% of capacity. This was partly solved in 1891 by building of a brick circular ventilation shaft 7 feet (2.1 m) in diameter down 200 feet (61 m) into the tunnel. Due to the ongoing ventilation problems in the tunnel, the use of electric locomotives in the tunnel was considered, however by 1904 plans for a new set of tunnels (known as the "Helensburgh Deviation") were well advanced, so make-do measures were introduced to minimise the smoke problem. With the use of longer or double headed trains, smoke problems necessitated installation in 1908 of a forced air fan at the northern end of the tunnel.

In 1915 the Helensburgh deviation was under construction to create a set of new tunnels deviating around the Stanwell Park amphitheatre: the duplicated line was able to fully bypass the Otford tunnel and it was closed on 10 October 1920.

The Otford Tunnel was subsequently used as a pedestrian access from Otford to Stanwell Park.

The repaired tunnel

In 1942/43, as part of a war-time explosives programme, the Army detonated a section of roof approximately 1,630 to 1,643 m (5,348 to 5,390 ft) into the tunnel.

In 1959 the tunnel was used by Eden Industries to farm mushrooms. The debris created by the 1942/43 explosion was cleared away, and a 13 m (43 ft) box-like reinforced concrete section was built to replace the brick walls demolished in the explosion and support the tunnel structure.

The tunnel was closed for public access in 2000. RailCorp has placed security gates at the southern portal at Stanwell Park to deter vandalism.

== Description ==
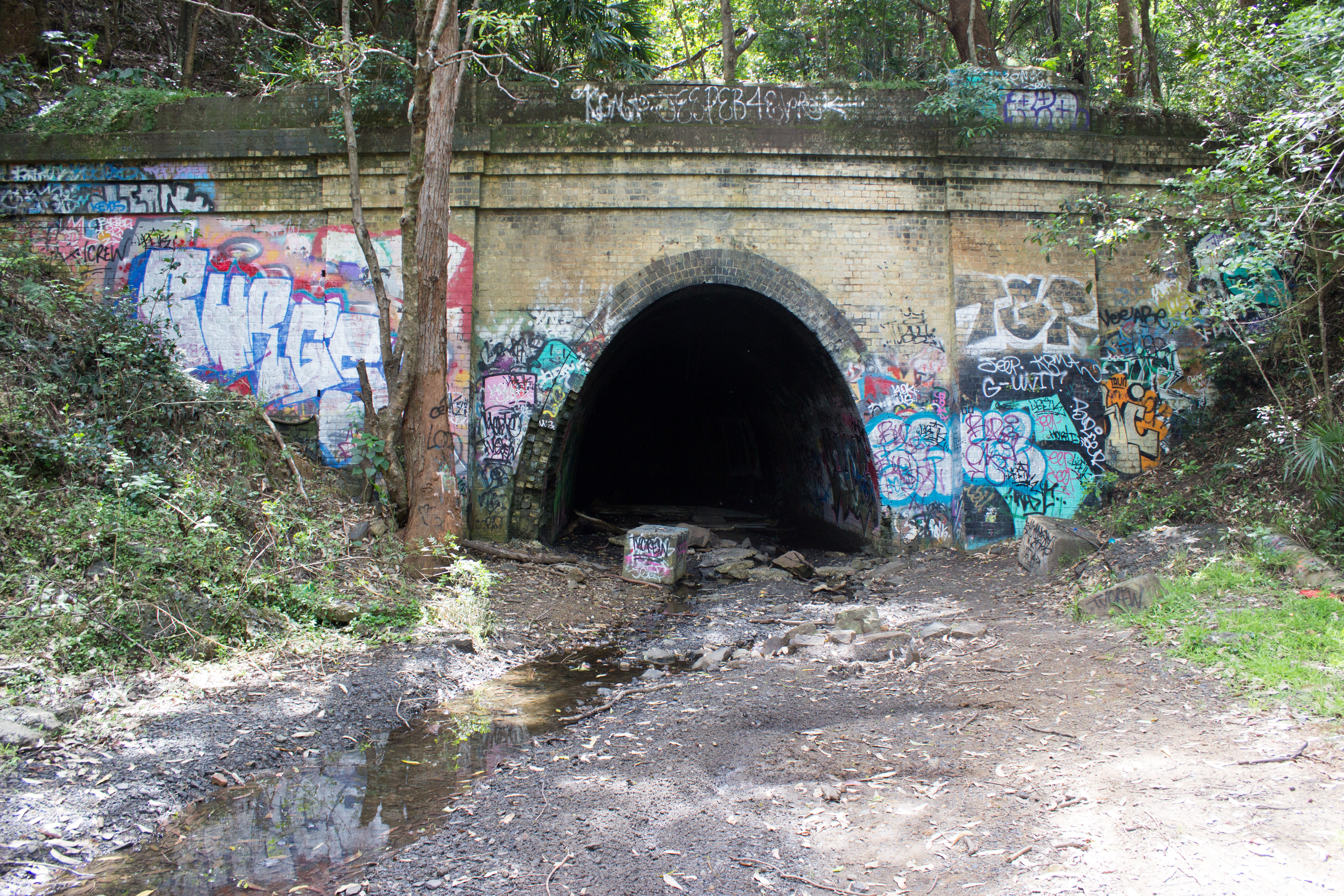
Southern entrance to the tunnel in Stanwell Park.

The precinct includes the tunnel (including entrance and approaches) (1888) and the vent shaft to the tunnel (1891). The tunnel is accessed from its southern portal at Stanwell Park, at the end of Chellow Dene Avenue (Lawrence Hargrave Memorial Park). The northern portal is located approximately 440m south-west of Otford Railway Station.

Otford Railway Tunnel (1888)

This is a disused concrete and brick arched 1824m long single track tunnel. The tunnel originally had a sandstone dish drain running through it, covered by large sandstone slabs, however much of the sandstone has been removed. The track bed and drain are estimated to be approximately 1.3 m below the current surface. The 1891 brick vent shaft is located halfway along the length of the tunnel.

Northern portal: the northern portal is located approximately 440m south of Otford Railway Station.

Archaeological potential

Remains of buildings, foundations etc for ventilating plant, near the northern portal of the tunnel.

Condition and integrity

It was reported to be in moderate condition as at 26 October 2010, as the southern portal needed new steel security gates to prevent wildlife and public entry, The condition of the track bed, ballast and central sandstone draining varies along the length of the tunnel.

It is relatively intact apart from the damaged and reshored section from 1942/43 explosion and some loss of sandstone from dish drain.

=== Modifications and dates ===
- 1891: Vent shaft constructed
- 1907: Speed indicator
- 1908: Fan
- 1919: Wind indicator

== Heritage listing ==
The Otford Railway Tunnel – including the tunnel structure, sandstone dish drain and ventilation stack – is of State heritage significance. It was the longest and steepest single line tunnel to be built at the time (1824m long with a 1 in 40 gradient) as part of a major engineering work built in 1888 to connect the Illawarra line to Sydney. It is part of a notoriously steep section of the Illawarra line south of Waterfall used in the late 19th century by steam trains and bypassed by the Helensburgh deviation in 1919. The Otford tunnel is of technical significance as an important engineering work in the early construction of the Illawarra line and was also used during the second world war as part of an explosives program. Its elaborate system of venting is an important historical remnant of the problems encountered in working this tunnel.

Otford railway tunnel was listed on the New South Wales State Heritage Register on 2 April 1999 having satisfied the following criteria.

The place is important in demonstrating the course, or pattern, of cultural or natural history in New South Wales.

The Otford tunnel is of historical significance as a major engineering work built 1888 to connect the Illawarra line to Sydney. It is part of a notoriously steep section of the Illawarra line south of Waterfall used in the late 19th century by steam trains, and bypassed by the Helensburgh deviation in 1919.

The place is important in demonstrating aesthetic characteristics and/or a high degree of creative or technical achievement in New South Wales.

The Otford tunnel is of technical significance as an important engineering work in the early construction of the Illawarra line. It was the longest and steepest single line tunnel to be built at the time (5985–1824m) long, with a 1 in 40 gradient). Its elaborate system of venting is an important historical remnant of the problems encountered in working this tunnel.

The place has potential to yield information that will contribute to an understanding of the cultural or natural history of New South Wales.

The tunnel has research potential for its ability to reveal late 19th century tunnel construction techniques, including early industrial use of concrete.

The place possesses uncommon, rare or endangered aspects of the cultural or natural history of New South Wales.

The tunnel is rare as a relatively intact 1888 tunnel built for the operation of steam trains on the Illawarra line through the difficult Waterfall to Clifton terrain.

The place is important in demonstrating the principal characteristics of a class of cultural or natural places/environments in New South Wales.

Representative of late 19th century tunnels built by Rowe & Smith for the Illawarra line from Waterfall to Clifton.
