= Stanwell Park railway station =

Railway station in New South Wales, Australia

Stanwell Park
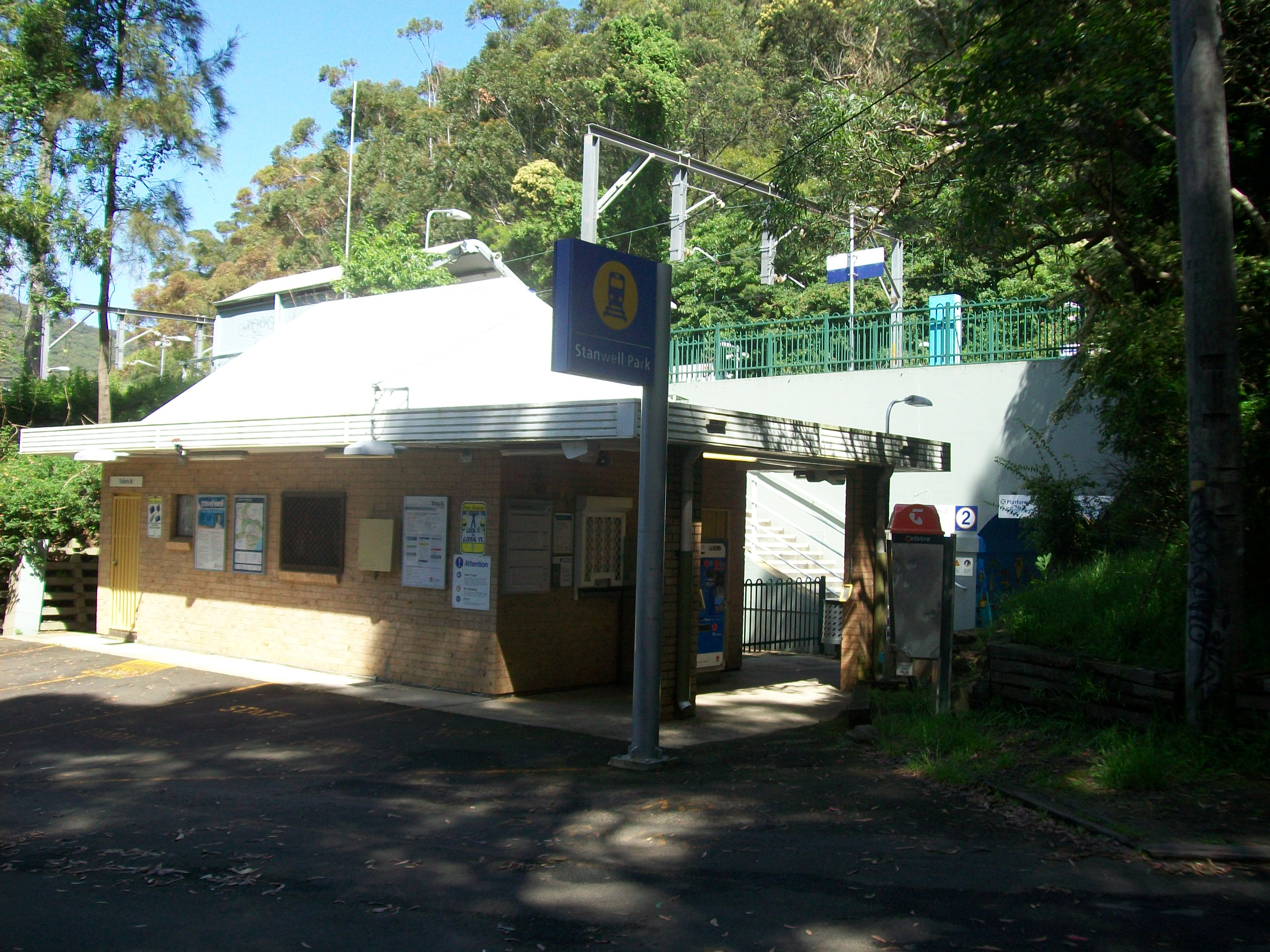
- Railway Crescent entrance, January 2008

General information
- Location: Railway Crescent, Stanwell Park; Australia
- Coordinates: 34°13′35″S 150°58′52″E
- Elevation: 88 metres (289 ft)
- Owner: Transport Asset Manager of New South Wales
- Operator: Sydney Trains
- Line: South Coast
- Distance: 55.95 kilometres (34.77 mi) from Central
- Platforms: 2 side
- Tracks: 2
- Connections: Bus

Construction
- Structure type: Ground
- Accessible: No

Other information
- Status: Weekdays: Staffed: 5.35am to 9.35am: Weekends and public holidays: Unstaffed
- Station code: SWP
- Website: Transport for NSW

History
- Opened: 23 December 1901
- Rebuilt: 10 October 1920

Passengers
- 2023: 32,800 (year); 90 (daily) (Sydney Trains, NSW TrainLink)

Services
Preceding station	Intercity Trains	Following station
Coalcliff towards Kiama or Port Kembla	South Coast Line	Otford towards Central or Bondi Junction
Location

Stanwell Park railway station is located on the South Coast railway line in New South Wales, Australia. It serves the seaside village of Stanwell Park opening on 23 December 1901, relocating to its current location on 10 October 1920.

== Buildings and railway history ==
The original rail line followed what is now Lawrence Hargrave Drive, curving around the southern headland and through Stanwell Park. The station opened on 14 March 1890 at its original site opposite Station Street under the footbridge. To the north the line followed Chellow Dene Avenue to the Otford Tunnel through Bald Hill.

A platform was provided on the eastern side on 24 April 1890, and was moved to the western side to make room for a crossing loop which opened on 23 December 1901. Station buildings were added on 4 June 1903 and a signal box on 17 May 1909. A second platform was provided on 13 July 1909, and the footbridge over the station installed on 9 October 1911.

To the north a steep grade of 1 in 40 faced northbound trains almost all the way to Otford. This combined with the 1,550-metre (5,090 ft) long Otford Tunnel meant that many trains were divided at Stanwell Park and hauled through to Otford or Waterfall in stages. Refuge sidings were provided for northbound trains at Stanwell Park from 17 December 1912 so that the rear portion of divided trains no longer had to be left on the main line.

In 1920, the original single line was replaced with a double track deviation. The deviation avoided the Otford Tunnel and steep grades by tracing around the Stanwell Park amphitheatre at a higher level, and the present station was constructed. The new line featured an eight span, 145-metre (476 ft) long, 42-metre (138 ft) high curved viaduct over Stanwell Creek south of the station which required over three million bricks in its construction.

== Platforms and services ==
Stanwell Park has two side platforms and is serviced by Sydney Trains South Coast line services travelling between Waterfall and Port Kembla. Some peak hour and late night services operate to Sydney Central, Bondi Junction and Kiama.

Platform	Line	Stopping pattern	Notes
1	SCO	services to Waterfall peak hour, late night & weekend services to Sydney Central & Bondi Junction	
2	SCO	services to Thirroul & Port Kembla peak hour, late night & weekend services to Kiama	

== Transport links ==
Premier Charters operates two bus routes via Stanwell Park station, under contract to Transport for NSW:

- 2: to Wollongong via Thirroul
- 15: to Helensburgh station
