= Otford railway station, New South Wales =

Railway station in New South Wales, Australia

Otford
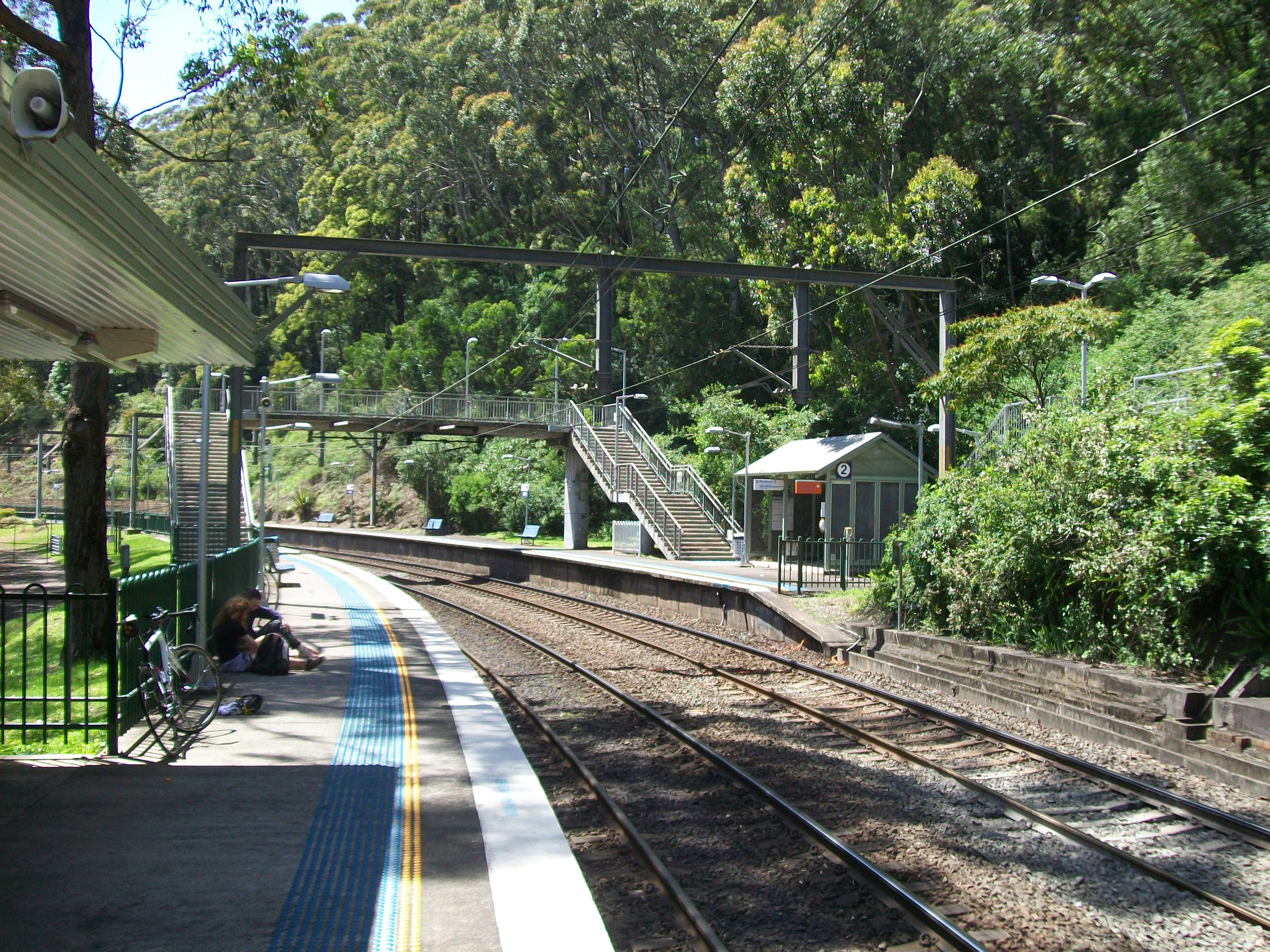
- Northbound view from Platform 1, January 2008

General information
- Location: Lady Carrington Road, Otford; Australia
- Coordinates: 34°12′38″S 151°00′22″E
- Elevation: 116 metres (381 ft)
- Owner: Transport Asset Manager of New South Wales
- Operator: Sydney Trains
- Line: South Coast
- Distance: 52.64 kilometres (32.71 mi) from Central
- Platforms: 2 side
- Tracks: 2

Construction
- Structure type: Ground

Other information
- Status: Weekdays: Staffed: 5.35am to 9.35am: Weekends and public holidays: Unstaffed
- Station code: OTF
- Website: Transport for NSW

History
- Opened: 3 October 1888

Passengers
- 2023: 22,850 (year); 63 (daily) (Sydney Trains, NSW TrainLink)

Services
Preceding station	Intercity Trains	Following station
Stanwell Park towards Kiama or Port Kembla	South Coast Line	Helensburgh towards Central or Bondi Junction
Former services
Preceding station	Former services	Following station
Stanwell Park towards Bomaderry	South Coast Line (1890–1983)	Lilyvale towards Sydney
Location

Otford railway station is located on the South Coast railway line in New South Wales, Australia. It serves the village of Otford opening on 3 October 1888. Two refuge sidings existed north of the station until removed in the 1980s.

== Platforms and services ==
Otford has two side platforms and is serviced by Sydney Trains South Coast line services travelling between Waterfall and Port Kembla. Some peak hour and late night services operate to Sydney Central, Bondi Junction and Kiama.

Platform	Line	Stopping pattern	Notes
1	SCO	services to Waterfall peak hour, late night & weekend services to Sydney Central & Bondi Junction	
2	SCO	services to Thirroul & Port Kembla peak hour, late night & weekend services to Kiama	
