= The Executives =

- Origin: Helensburgh, New South Wales, Australia
- Genres: Pop
- Years active: 1966–1969, 1974–1978, 1985–1986
- Label: Festival Records
- Past members: Ray Burton, Rhys Clark, Gino Cunico, Carole King, Brian King, Sammons; Wayne Newey

The Executives were an Australian pop music band, formed in 1966 and reformed in 1974, consisting of band members Ray Burton, Rhys Clark, Gino Cunico, Brian King, Carole King, Gary King, Keith Leslie and Brian Patterson. They are arguably best known for their top 40 singles "My Aim Is To Please You" (1967), "Sit Down, I Think I Love You" (1967) and "Windy Day" (1968) reaching No. 18, No. 20 and No. 24 respectively on the Australian charts.

The group later reformed in 1985 with the line up of Carole King and Jonne Sands on vocals, Jose McLaughlin (keyboards), Pip Lee (drums), Moz Sammons (guitar) and Wayne Newey (bass). This version of the group worked extensively throughout Australia before disbanding in 1986.

Dressed in Ned Kelly-style breastplates, they appeared on Skippy the Bush Kangaroo in the episode "The Bushrangers" in 1968.

== Discography ==
=== Albums ===
==== Studio albums ====
- The Executives (Festival Records, 1968)
- The Executives on Bandstand (Festival Records, 1968)
- The Executives ...Now, (Universal Summit, 1972)– SRA250-007

==== Compilation albums ====
- The Happening World of The Executives (1990)

=== Charting singles ===
Year	Single	Chart Positions
Year	Single	AUS
1967	"My Aim Is To Please You"	4
1967	"Sit Down, I Think I Love You"	4
1968	"It's a Happening World"	30
1968	"Windy Day"	7
1968	"Summerhill Road"	36

=== EPs ===
- "Break Out" (1967)
- "It's a Happening World" (1968)
- "Windy Day" (1968)
- "Parenthesis" (1969)
