= Keith Glen =

Australian rugby league footballer (1939–2017)

Personal information
- Full name: Keith Glen
- Born: 28 October 1939; Sydney, New South Wales, Australia
- Died: 25 February 2017 (aged 77); Sanctuary Point, New South Wales

Playing information
- Position: Prop
Club
Years	Team	Pld	T	G	FG	P
1961–63	St. George	5	0	0	0	0
1964–66	Canterbury-Bankstown	29	0	0	0	0
	Total	34	0	0	0	0

Keith Glen (1939–2017) was an Australian rugby league footballer who played in the 1960s.

Former St. George and Canterbury prop, Glen, was a Ramsgate junior and moved into St. George minor grade teams in 1960.

On 17 June 1961, at the Sydney Cricket Ground, he made his first grade debut in St. George’s 9–7 win over North Sydney. He also played with the top grade side the following week when they defeated Parramatta 32–12 at the old Cumberland Oval. In Glen’s four seasons with St. George, he had to compete for a first grade front row position with such great players as Billy Wilson, Kevin Ryan, Monty Porter and Robin Gourley, while his teammates included men such as John Raper, Brian Clay, Norm Provan, Reg Gasnier, Graeme Langlands and Billy Smith.

This was the era of St. George’s 11 successive Premierships from 1956 and Glen was good enough to play five top-grade games with the club. He was also a member of the St. George Dragons 1962 reserve grade Premiership-winning team which defeated Wests 19–0 in the Grand Final at the Cricket Ground on 15 September 1962.

In 1964, Glen joined Canterbury and in three seasons with the Berries, he played 29 first-grade games and 16 with the reserve grade side. After leaving Canterbury, Glen and his family moved to Helensburgh, New South Wales, where he played three seasons with the Northern Suburbs club in the Illawarra first grade competition.

His last season was with Helensburgh in 1970, in Illawarra fourth grade.

Glen died on 25 February 2017.
