= Lilyvale railway station =

Former railway station in New South Wales, Australia

Lilyvale
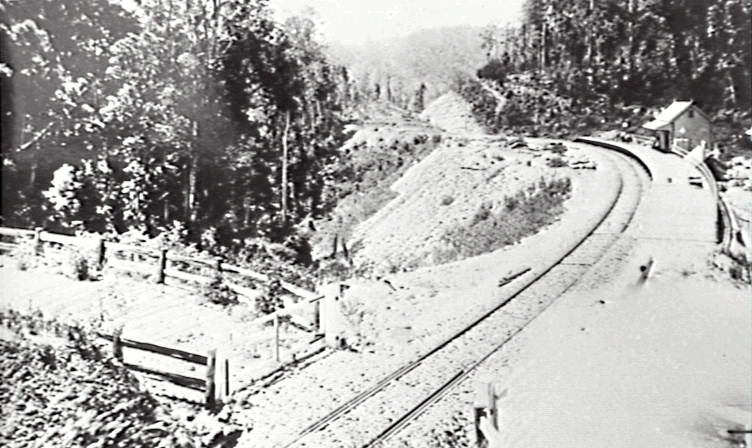
- The first station, sometime between 1910 and 1915.

General information
- Location: Lilyvale, New South Wales; Australia
- Coordinates: 34.1906°S 151.0048°E
- Operator: State Rail Authority
- Line: South Coast
- Platforms: 2 (side)
- Tracks: 2

Construction
- Structure type: Ground

Other information
- Status: Closed

History
- Opened: 1 October 1890
- Closed: 25 December 1983
- Rebuilt: 1915
- Former names: Lilydale (1890)

Services
Preceding station	Former services	Following station
Otford towards Bomaderry	South Coast Line	Helensburgh towards Sydney
Location

Lilyvale railway station was a railway station on the South Coast railway line serving the small former village of Lilyvale, New South Wales, Australia.

== History ==
=== First station ===
The first Lilyvale station opened in 1890 as Lilydale, before being renamed Lilyvale that same year, serving the small village of Lilyvale. The first Lilyvale station was located just south of the southern portal of the Lilyvale tunnel at the northern end of the Bulgo or Otford Valley. To the north were the original Metropolitan Colliery siding junction with signal box and short platform followed by Helensburgh railway station further north. To the south were the Vickery siding and Otford railway station and adjacent sidings.

=== Second station ===
New alignment sections of the railway were constructed between Cawley and Clifton from 1912 to 1915 and the new dual track passed through a new tunnel just to the east of the old Lilyvale tunnel and at a slightly lower elevation. A second Lilyvale railway station, just to the south of the original opened in 1915.

== Description ==
The first Lilyvale station consisted of a single platform and weatherboard building on the western side of the original single track alignment. A road passed over a level crossing of the railway line between the tunnel and the station. This crossing was an Accommodation Works crossing under the Public Works Act and cannot be closed by the railways or government so users still have a right to cross the railway.

The second station consisted of two side platforms with weatherboard buildings and a steel overhead footbridge. Just to the south was a single lane brick vehicle bridge which was built as Accommodation Works under the Public Works Act and cannot be closed by the railway or government.

== Services ==
Lilyvale station was serviced by mainline Thirroul and Waterfall trains, with passenger services ceasing in 1983. By this time, the weatherboard buildings had already been removed, although the station and bridges were demolished six years later with the electrification of the line in 1989. As the vehicle bridge was an Accommodation Works crossing under the Public Works Act users maintained a right to cross the railway even after closure.
