= Otford, New South Wales =

Otford
- Suburb
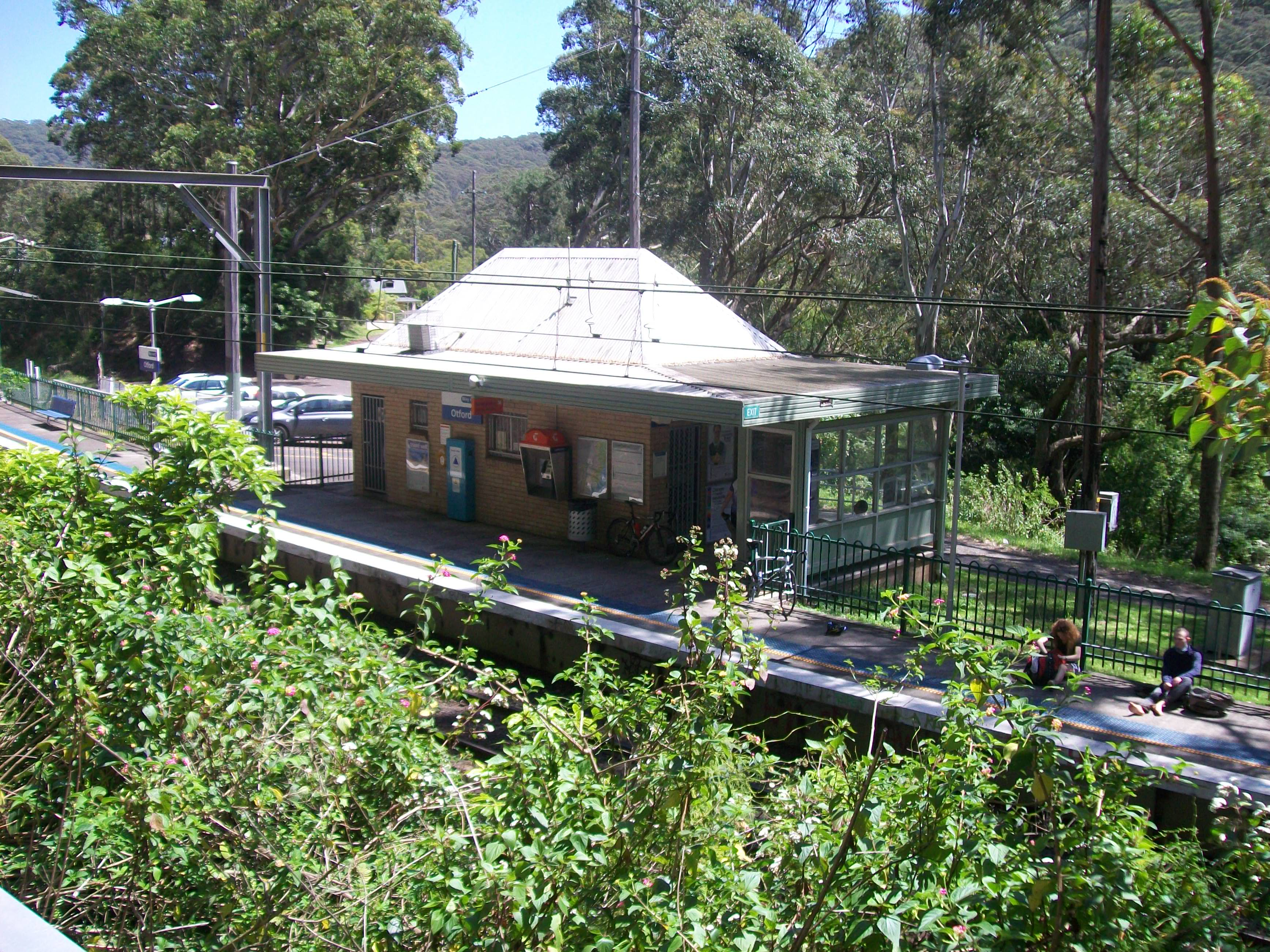
- Otford railway station

- Coordinates: 34°13′S 151°00′E
- Country: Australia
- State: New South Wales
- City: Wollongong
- LGA: City of Wollongong
- Location: 55 km (34 mi) from Sydney; 30 km (19 mi) from Wollongong

Government
  - State electorate: Heathcote
  - Federal division: Cunningham
- Elevation: 172 m (564 ft)

Population
  - Total: 396 (2021 census)
- Postcode: 2508
Suburbs around Otford
| Helensburgh | Lilyvale | Royal National Park |
| Helensburgh | Otford |
| | Stanwell Tops | Stanwell Park |

Otford is a village in the Otford Valley located 55 km south of the Sydney and 30 km north of the Wollongong CBD in New South Wales, Australia. Otford is within the local government area of the City of Wollongong.

== Location ==
Otford is situated in the Otford Valley, north of Undola Ridge, Stanwell Park and Stanwell Tops. To the east of the valley is the coastal ridge and small community of Bulgo, also the name of a hill in the area and the former name of Otford. To the west, on the plateau, is the township of Helensburgh. To the north is the locality of Lilyvale and the Royal National Park.

The town is on the southern tip of the Royal National Park and features many native plants in its bushland like the Dendrobium Lilly. The trees of the bushland are mostly of the dry Eucalypt variety but the valley slopes support tall open Eucalypt forest and rainforest along the creek and in gullies.

The landscape is mostly hillside, and the Hacking River runs through the valley to the north. The highest points around Otford reach over 250 metres above sea level, at Bulgo and Otford Hills. The Bulgo Range of coastal hill headland is the northern extension of the Illawarra escarpment as it gradually turns into coastal cliffs.

A local attraction is the Otford Farm for horse riding, Govinda Valley and the Otford Pantry cafe. Otford's coastal ridge is home to the Otford Lookout on Lawrence Hargrave Drive which has similar views south over the Illawarra as does its southern neighbour Bald Hill.

== History ==
Otford was first known as Bulgo. The name Bulgo was first marked on Robert Dixon's 'Map of the Colony of New South Wales' in 1842 and the name was in use for some time after. When the construction of the Illawarra (now officially South Coast Line) line was taking place a village formed in 1885, with four houses. The name was changed to Otford in May 1885. During that year the village grew and the first school was built, as well as a post office. In 1887 a hotel was present, along with a butchers store, bakers shop, tailor, jeweller and general store. Otford also had a billiard room and skittle alley. After construction of the railway had finished the village went into decline and the school was closed in 1893. Trains on the line stopped at Otford to take in water and a small railway and sawmill centre developed at the entrance to the tunnel.

A timber mill at Karingal, Lilyvale, in the north of the Otford valley was established by Thomas Gergos and his three brothers in 1875. James Forster built a mill to the south in 1899. Lilyvale Mushrooms Pty. Ltd began in 1952 in a small tunnel at Lilyvale and in 1959 two tunnels were in operation.

The current railway tunnel between Otford and Stanwell Park was made in 1917 after annoyances in the old one such as buildup of smoke in the unventilated route and the steep descent. The railway achievements of the area are known as engineering feats, and the views are equally well known. The abandoned, original railway tunnel between Otford and Stanwell Park was used for a mushroom farm but is now disused.

The village shops and the post office all closed. A café, with limited trading hours, remains on Lady Wakehurst Drive where it serves the tourist trade.

Otford is part of the old Parish of Bulgo and was within the area of Bulli Shire Council which was incorporated into Wollongong City Council.

== Heritage listings ==
Otford has a number of heritage-listed sites, including:

- Illawarra railway: Otford railway tunnel

== Population ==
In the 2021 Census, there were 396 people in Otford. 74.7% of people were born in Australia and 87.6% of people spoke only English at home. The most common response for religion was No Religion at 51.1%.

== Services ==
Otford has little remaining services but retains a public primary school, railway station on the Sydney Trains Intercity South Coast Line, a volunteer Rural Fire Brigade, Otford Community Hall, tennis court and playground and a cafe. Otford railway station, once had award-winning gardens and picturesque buildings but is now a stark concrete and brick commuter stop. The railway station is used by bushwalkers accessing the Royal National Park.

One of the current most important aspects of Otford is its Bushfire Brigade. All members are village based volunteers who protect the town and district from the severe bushfires that threaten the town. It is an integral aspect of the local community. The local school is the other community focus of this small family and community oriented Australian village. The school has been open again for many years.
