= The Australian Star =

Australian newspaper (1887–1909)

The Australian Star was a daily English-language newspaper published in Sydney, New South Wales, Australia, from 1887 to 1909. It was published as The Star, also known as The Star: the Australian Evening Daily, until 1910 and then renamed The Sun, which continued publication until 1988.

The Australian Star, front page, 2 January 1888

== History ==
Promoted as the "new Protectionist evening paper", The Australian Star was first published on Thursday 1 December 1887 by Arthur Smyth, at the offices of the Australian Newspaper Company, 78 King Street, Sydney. The founding editor was W. H. Traill, a strong protectionist who later represented the electorate of South Sydney in the New South Wales Legislative Assembly.

From 12 March 1909 the masthead became The Star: the Australian Evening Daily.

In 1910, the business of the Australian Newspaper Company, including The Star and The Sunday Sun, was acquired by Hugh Denison's newly registered company, Star and Sun Ltd. The Star became The Sun on 1 July 1910.

== Digitisation ==
Some issues of the paper have been digitised as part of the Australian Newspapers Digitisation Program of the National Library of Australia.

== See also ==
- List of newspapers in Australia
- List of newspapers in New South Wales
