= Metropolitan Colliery =

Coal mine in New South Wales, Australia

- Interactive map of Metropolitan Colliery
- Location: Helensburgh, New South Wales, Australia; 34°11′15″S 150°59′35″E
- Products: Metallurgical coal
- Opened: 1887
- Company: Peabody Energy
- Website: www.peabodyenergy.com

The Metropolitan Colliery is a coal mine located near Helensburgh, New South Wales owned by Peabody Energy. It was opened by in 1887 by the Cumberland Coal & Iron Mining Company. In 1965, the mine was purchased by Australian Iron & Steel. A proposed sale to South32 in 2016 was abandoned after the Australian Competition & Consumer Commission refused to approve it.

Coal is exported from Port Kembla with the mine connected to the Illawarra railway line via a spur line.

The company is currently mining underneath the protected 'Special Area' of the Woronora Dam and Woronora Reservoir catchment, directly underneath the Reservoir.

In 2022 the Colliery achieved notoriety for polluting Australia's oldest National Park, following the discharge of coal sludge and waste into a creek running into the Hacking River, which flows the length of the park and into Port Hacking.
