= Helensburgh, New South Wales =

Helensburgh
- Suburb
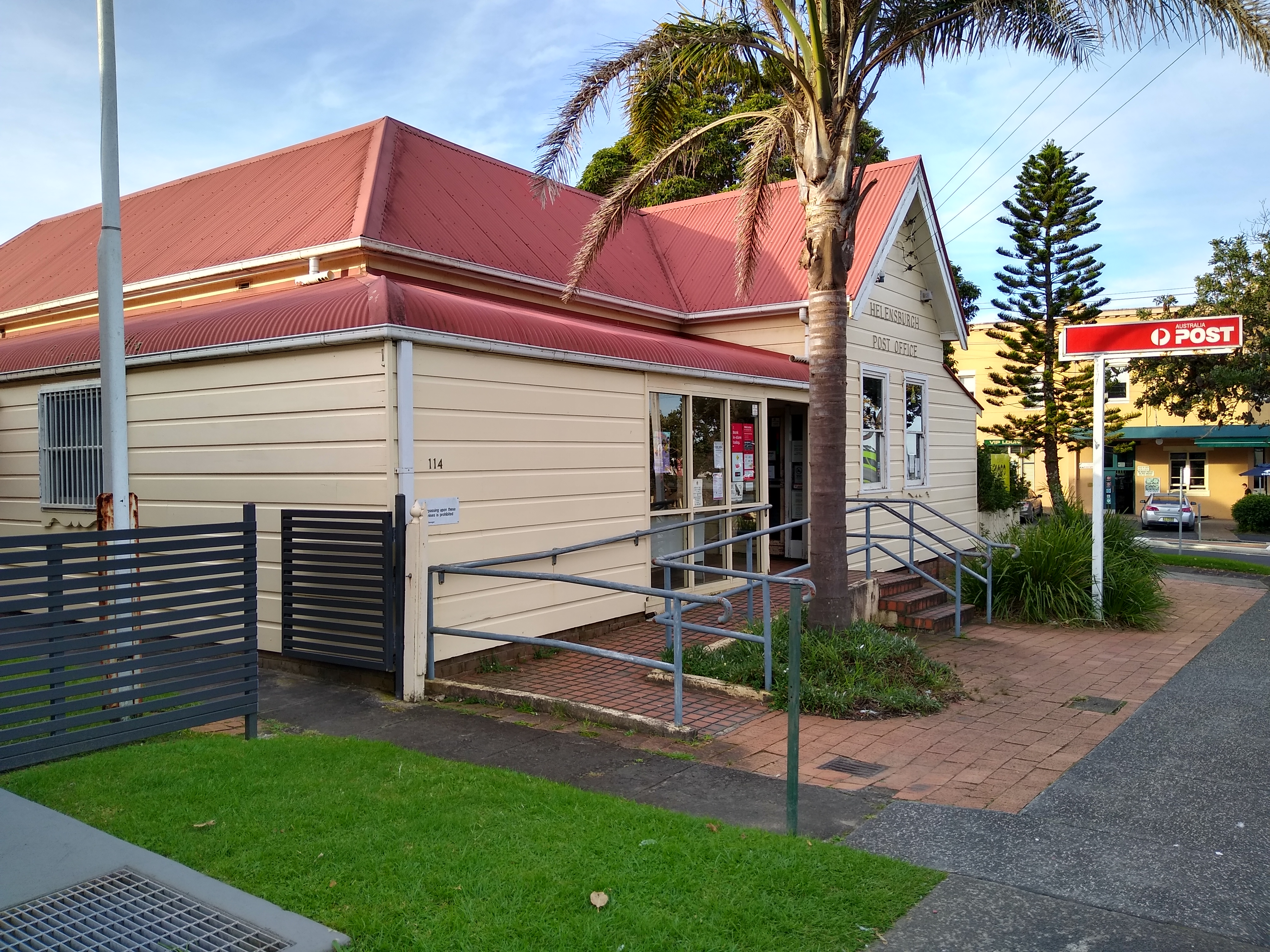
- Helensburgh Post Office

- Interactive map of Helensburgh
- Coordinates: 34°11′26″S 150°58′55″E
- Country: Australia
- State: New South Wales
- City: Wollongong
- LGA: City of Wollongong
- Location: 45 km (28 mi) south of Sydney; 35 km (22 mi) north of Wollongong
- Established: 1865

Government
  - State electorate: Heathcote
  - Federal division: Cunningham
- Elevation: 255 m (837 ft)

Population
  - Total: 6,576 (2021 census)
- Postcode: 2508
Suburbs around Helensburgh
Wedderburn	Waterfall	Tasman Sea
Wedderburn	Helensburgh	Tasman Sea
Appin	Stanwell Tops	Tasman Sea

Helensburgh is a small town, located 45 kilometres (28 mi) south of Sydney and 35 kilometres (22 mi) north of Wollongong and north and above the Illawarra escarpment and region. Helensburgh is in the Wollongong City Council local government area. It is surrounded by bushland reserves adjacent to the southern end of the Royal National Park and Garawarra State Conservation Area and the Woronora reservoir water catchment is to its west.

== Geography ==
The town is on the Woronora Plateau. To the southeast, it is separated from Otford in the Hacking River valley below by a high ridge but linked to it by the South Coast Railway and Otford Road. It is separated from Waterfall by Garawarra State Conservation Area and the former Garawarra sanitorium but linked to it by the South Coast Railway with tight bends descending from the line's highest point at Waterfall to Helensburgh Station. To the north of Helensburgh and east of the railway line are the two segments of the Garawarra State Conservation Area and Royal National Park. Helensburgh is beyond the Sydney metropolitan train service which finishes at Waterfall.

Helensburgh is the northernmost settlement of the Wollongong Local Government Area and is above and to the north of the Illawarra escarpment and the region's northernmost point of Bald Hill. Helensburgh has proximity to the beach and overall quiet, unpolluted bush surroundings.

== History ==
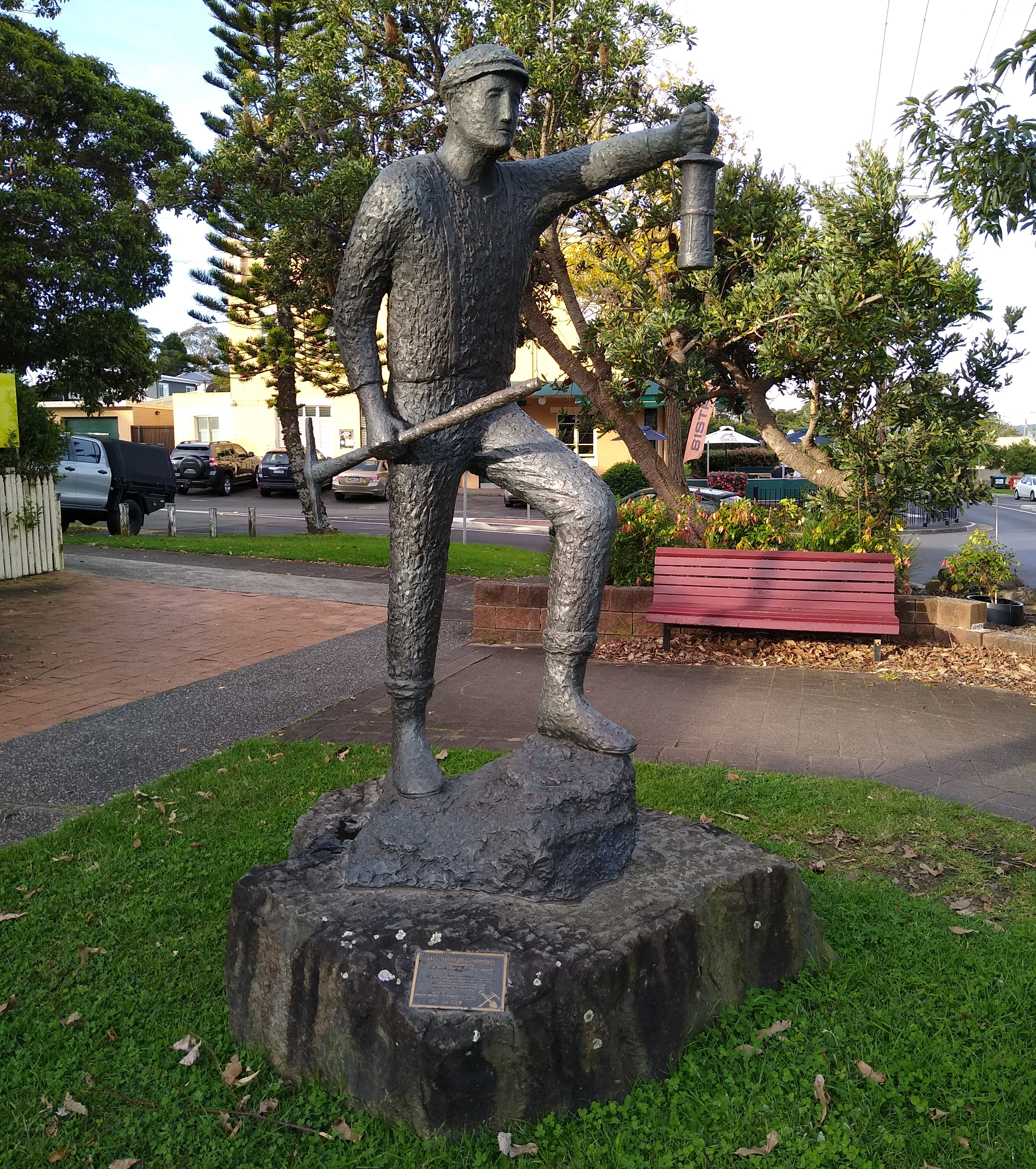
Helensburgh Coalminer, a 2008 statue celebrating Helensburgh's heritage

Originally called Camp Creek, Helensburgh is named after the town of Helensburgh located by the River Clyde in Scotland which is also a railway town. It was established as a railway construction camp in the 1880s during the construction of the South Coast Railway and then became a coal miners' settlement for the Metropolitan Colliery. Helensburgh Post Office opened on 1 December 1886. The town developed other shops and services and market gardens to supply local residents.

The duplicated curved railway platform is a rare reminder of early railways. The old Helensburgh railway station and the line were covered in the earth until recent years but has been partially uncovered for historical purposes.

East of Helensburgh is the older locality of Lilyvale a one-time railway construction camp, fettler, timber and orcharding settlement that had its own railway station and once supported its own Metropolitan hotel, shops and post office but is now mostly part of the Royal National Park and Garawarra State Conservation Area and returned to bush. Lilyvale became a satellite settlement when Helensburgh grew larger. Lilyvale and the Metropolitan Colliery in Helensburgh were directly linked by the original railway and after the railway was diverted in 1914, mine workers could walk the abandoned railway line and tunnels. Helensburgh and Lilyvale Workmen's Club, now merged as Tradies, Helensburgh, was founded in 1896. From the 1950s to 1970s, Lilyvale Mushrooms operated in the abandoned railway tunnels. Lilyvale railway station was closed in 1989 when the railway was electrified.

On the southwest fringe of Helensburgh is the locality of Blue Gum Forest, formerly a rural area.

A mural depicting miners is at the starting point of the old line.

Helensburgh underwent initial expansion planning in 1981 and had quadrupled its population in the mid-2000s, emerging into a popular outer-metro residential hub. It established its solidification as a family-oriented suburb in 2021.

=== Heritage listings ===
Helensburgh has a number of heritage-listed sites, including:

- Tunnel Road, Helensburgh railway station

== Population ==
According to the 2021 census of Population, there were 6,576 people in Helensburgh.

- Aboriginal and Torres Strait Islander people made up 3.3% of the population.
- 85.6% of people were born in Australia. The next most common country of birth was England at 4.5%.
- 92.6% of people only spoke English at home.
- The most common responses for religion were No Religion 44.1%, Catholic 23.4% and Anglican 16.5%.

== Schools ==
Helensburgh Public School opened in 1887 and currently has a student population of 460. The Holy Cross Catholic Parish Primary School was founded in 1900. There is no high school in Helensburgh, and the closest are in Heathcote, Engadine and Bulli.

== Transport ==
Helensburgh railway station is on the South Coast Railway, linking Sydney to Wollongong and Bomaderry. Owing to the drop in altitude from Waterfall to Helensburgh, a series of almost hairpin turns are created along the railway line.

== Media ==
Local radio stations that broadcast to the town are ABC Illawarra, 96.5 Wave FM, i98FM, and VOX FM.

Due to the town's close proximity to Sydney, most Sydney based radio stations can also be received in the town.

Helensburgh receives the five free-to-air television networks replayed from the Illawarra transmitter located in Knights Hill.

- ABC
- SBS
- Nine
- Seven
- Ten

Local newspaper is served by the Illawarra Mercury.

== Parks and recreation ==
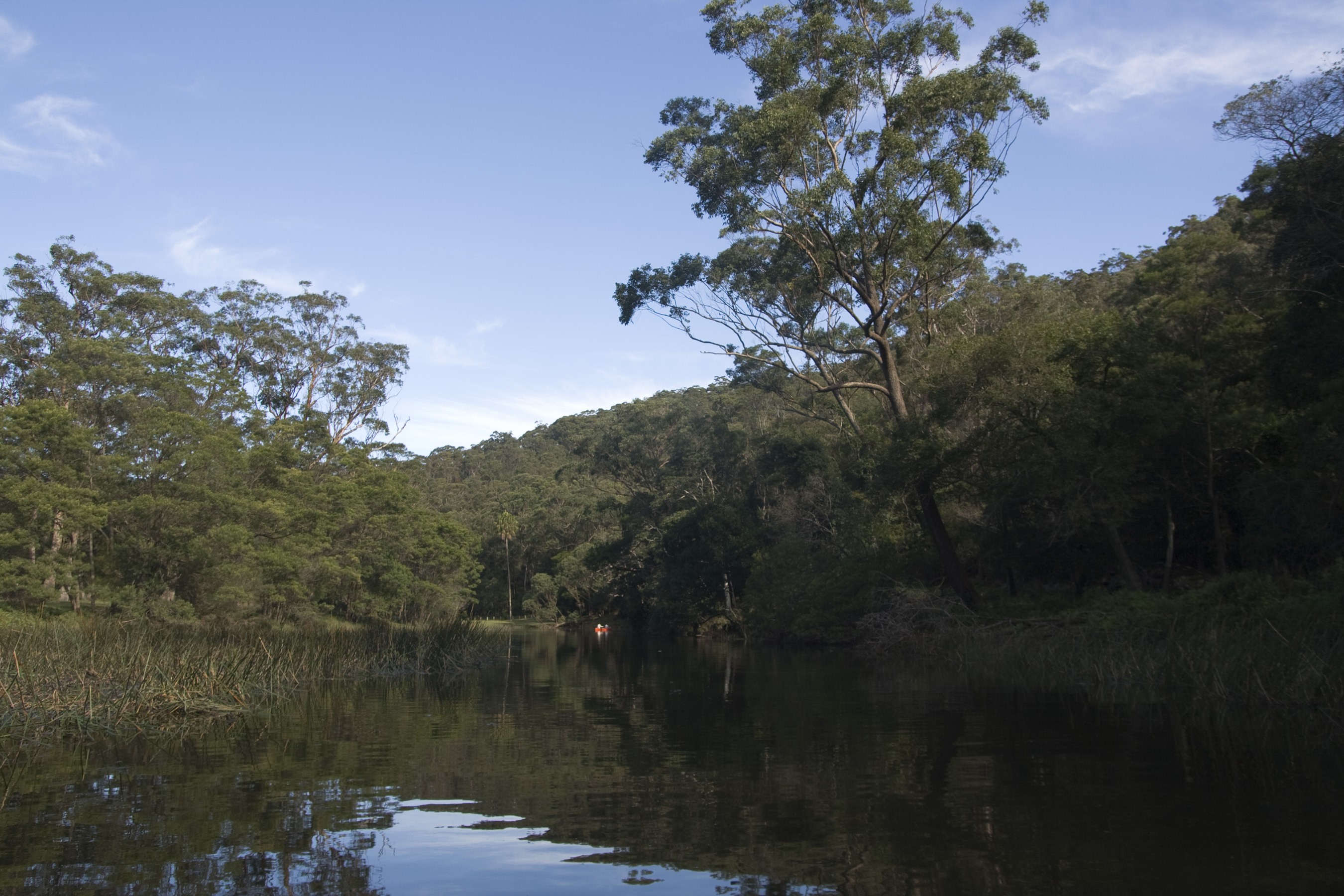
The Royal National Park located to the North of Helensburgh

Helensburgh is surrounded by the bushland of the Royal National Park, Garawarra State Conservation Area, water catchment of the Woronora Dam and adjacent Heathcote National Park and is picturesque and naturally bound but environmentally sensitive. This bushland location also makes Helensburgh susceptible to bushfires. The dry sclerophyll bush is home to several walking tracks and lyrebirds are common nearby. The Helensburgh Skate Park opened in July 2007.

== Culture and events ==
One of the most popular local events is the annual Helensburgh Lions Club Fair which is held in October. Other local events include the Holy Cross and Helensburgh Primary School Fetes. The Sri Venkateswara Hindu temple holds festivals and special days. Just before Christmas the local church holds a music festival with carols at Rex Jackson Oval. Fireworks are also held and is known as Carols in the Burgh.

== Politics ==
The town is now within the federal electorate of Cunningham, held by Labor's Alison Byrnes, and the state electorate of Heathcote, held by Labor MP Maryanne Stuart. Helensburgh has historically been a Labor-voting area. This voting pattern has persisted despite new housing estates bringing many new residents to Helensburgh.

== Weather ==
Weather conditions in Helensburgh are generally fairly mild throughout the year, much like the majority of the New South Wales coast. Day temperatures average between 24 °C and 29 °C in the summer months, and rarely go above 33 °C. Average day temperatures during winter months are between 6 °C and 12 °C, and rarely dip below 2 °C. Night temperatures tend to be much cooler, dropping off anywhere from 10 to 20 degrees after the sun goes down.

Helensburgh often seems like it has its very own climate compared to neighbouring locations, with visitors to the area often commenting that Helensburgh seems to be a couple of degrees colder than Sydney or Wollongong on the same day (especially in winter). Helensburgh also has a higher rainfall than its neighbours, although locals would claim that the difference between Helensburgh's rainfall rate and Sydney's or Wollongong's rainfall rates seems greater than what official sources would indicate it to be. Commuters can often be heard complaining about seeing clear blue skies in every other suburb on a rainy day in Helensburgh.

The reason for this microcosm of climate lies in Helensburgh's altitude. Although it does not appear to be particularly mountainous, Helensburgh is surrounded by coastal suburbs located virtually at sea level, while Helensburgh itself, due to an odd quirk of geography, is not. So while you would expect Helensburgh's weather to be more similar to Sydney's or Wollongong's, given their relative closeness to the north and the south, the fact that Helensburgh is around 250 metres higher above sea level than either of them does have a noticeable effect on its climate and weather patterns.

On the flip side, extreme weather conditions affecting Sydney or Wollongong generally aren't felt in Helensburgh. In recent years, several famously severe hailstorms and/or windstorms in both Sydney and Wollongong all left Helensburgh virtually untouched.

For the most part, Helensburgh reflects Australia's reputation for mostly fine weather, with moderate average temperatures, and wetter summer months with comparatively dry winters.

== Notable people ==
- Krystal Blackwell, rugby league player
- Damien Cook, rugby league player
- Keith Glen, rugby league player
- George Jardine, rugby league player
- Alicia McCormack, water polo player
- Saya Sakakibara, BMX Olympic gold medalist
- The Executives, Australian Pop Music Band

== Gallery ==
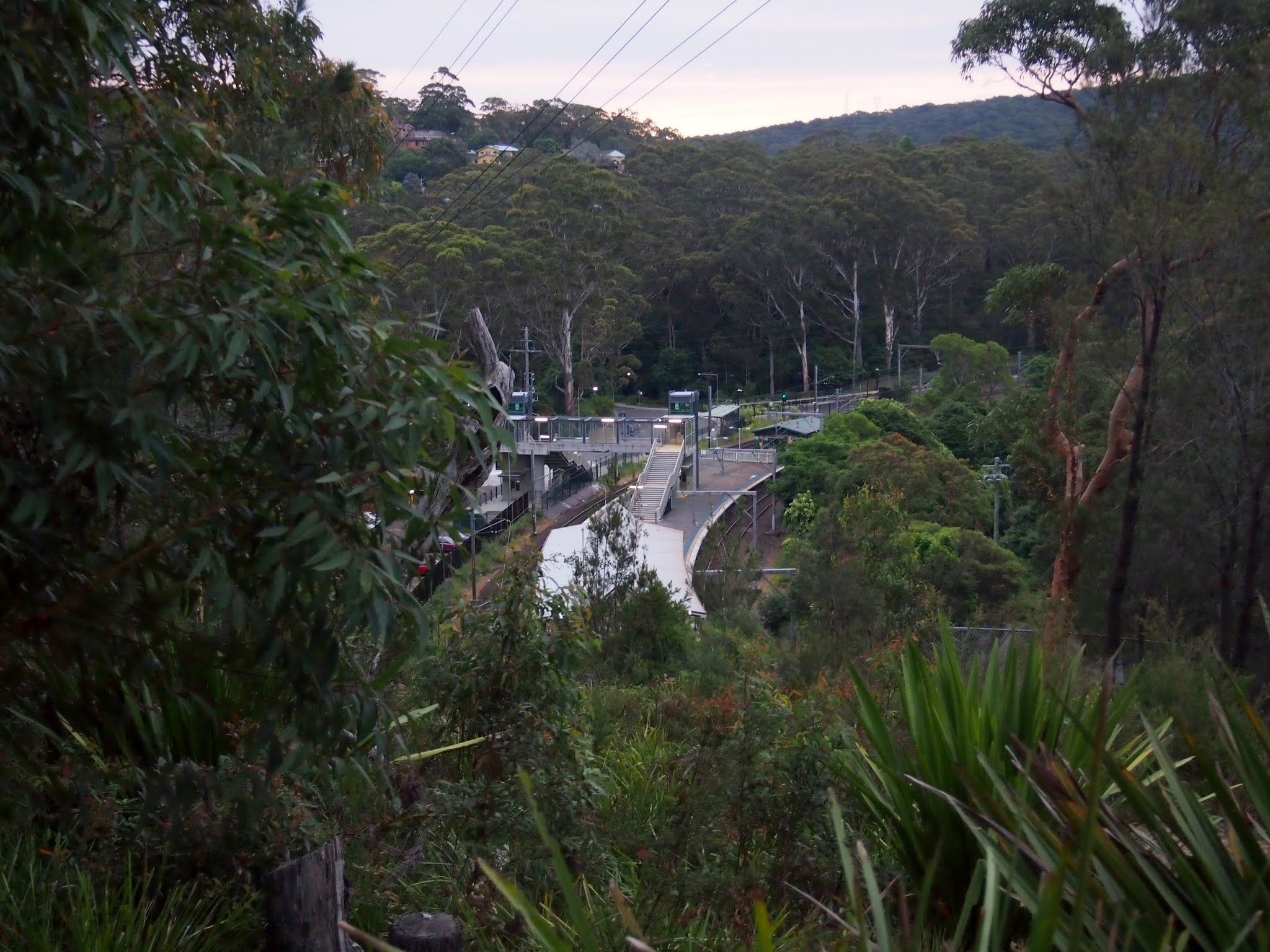
Helensburgh NSW 2508, Australia – Panorama #1

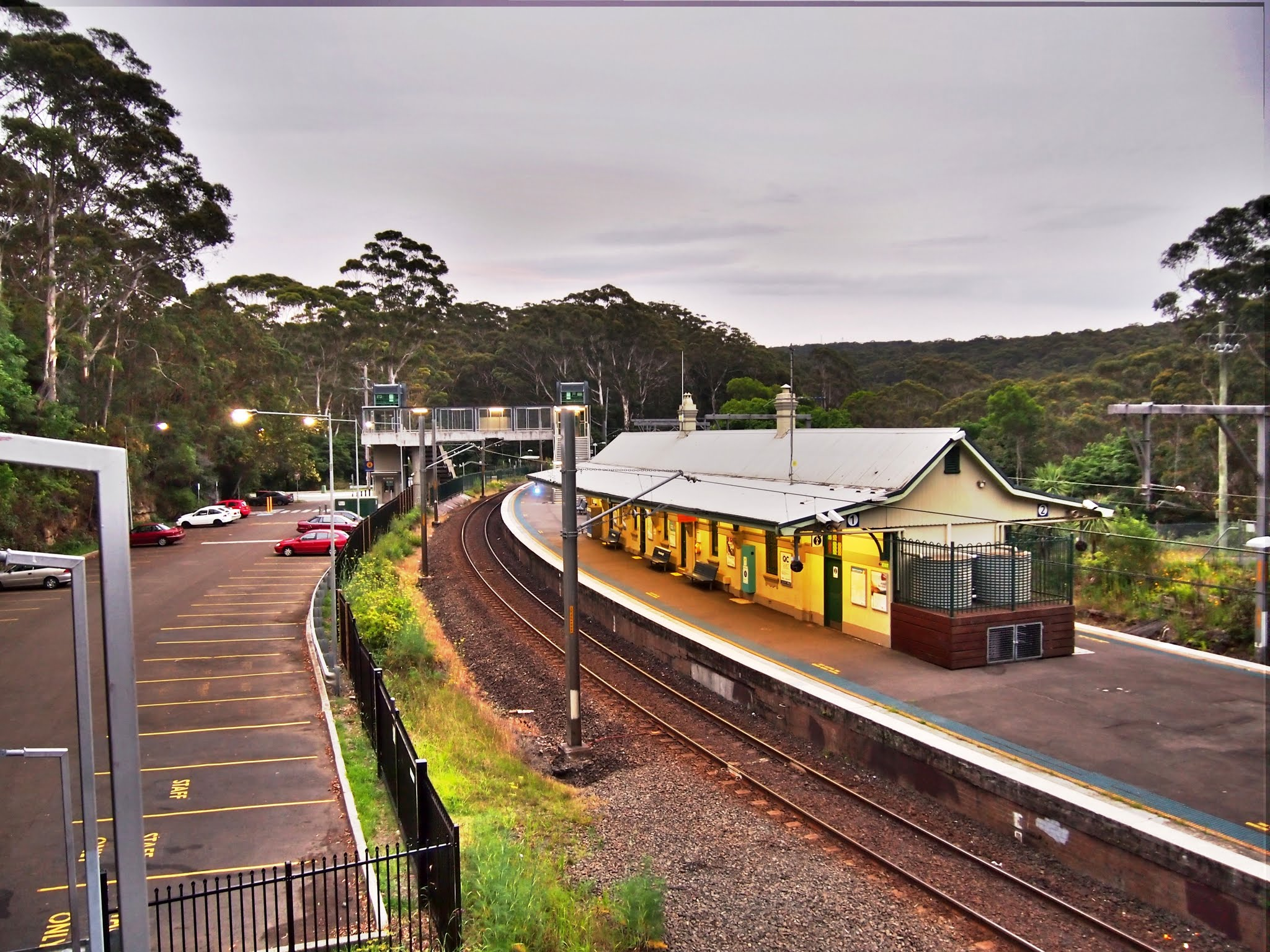
Helensburgh NSW 2508, Australia – Panorama #2

== See also ==
- Symbio Wildlife Park
