= Wombarra Claystone =

Geologic formation in eastern Australia

- Stratigraphic range: late Permian to early Triassic
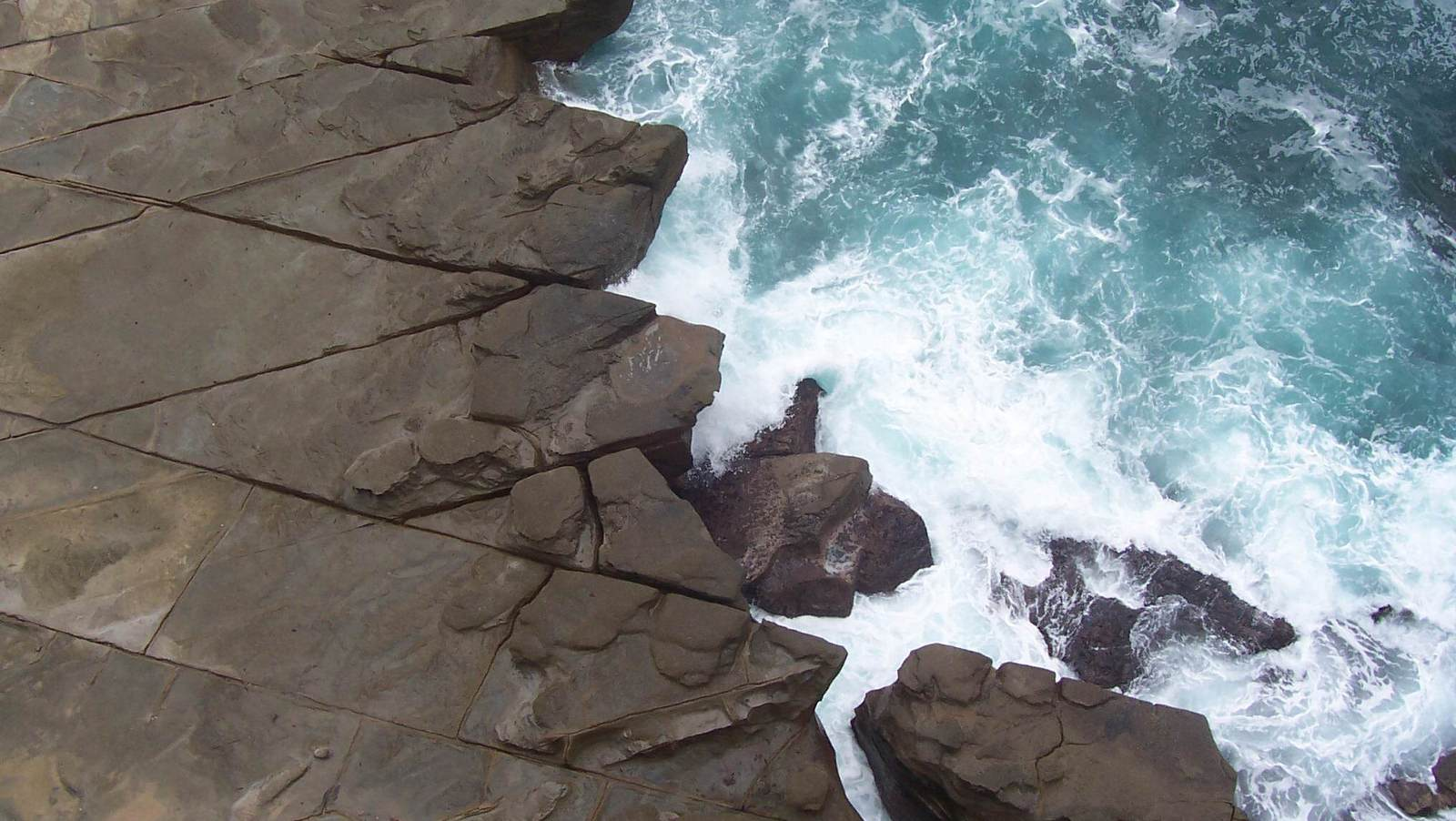
- below the Sea Cliff Bridge, Australia
- Type: Geological formation
- Unit of: Narrabeen Group
- Underlies: Scarborough Sandstone
- Overlies: Bulli Coal
- Thickness: up to 30 metres (100 ft)

Lithology
- Primary: shale
- Other: quartz-lithic sandstone

Location
- Region: New South Wales
- Country: Australia
- Extent: Sydney Basin

Type section
- Named for: Wombarra, New South Wales
- Location: Illawarra
- Country: Australia

The Wombarra Claystone is a geologic formation in the Sydney Basin in eastern Australia. Commonly seen in the Illawarra region, this stratum is up to 30 metres thick. Formed in the late Permian to the early Triassic, it is part of the Narrabeen Group of sedimentary rocks. This formation includes grey shale, and minor quartz-lithic sandstone.

== Geology ==
The Wombarra Claystone is a unit of the Narrabeen Group and forms part of the Clifton Subgroup, where it overlies the Coal Cliff Sandstone and underlies the Scarborough Sandstone. It consists of up to approximately 30 metres (98 ft) of mid-green, green-grey and chocolate-coloured claystone containing interbedded sandstone units. The proportion of sandstone increases progressively towards the south and west, ranging from less than 20% at some localities to more than 60% at Burragorang, approximately 70% at Yerrinbool and more than 90% at Avondale. As the sandstone component increases, the unit becomes progressively more difficult to distinguish from adjacent sandstone formations. Locally correlatable palaeosols also occur towards the upper part of the formation.

The formation records a transition in the sedimentary environments of the late Permian Sydney Basin. The Wombarra Claystone was deposited in a lacustrine environment associated with the subsiding floodplain and coal swamps of the underlying Illawarra Coal Measures. The formation represents the interval following the widespread development of the Bulli Coal, when a major climatic change caused the drowning and termination of coal-forming environments across the Late Permian coal measures. The predominantly non-coal sediments of the overlying Narrabeen Group were subsequently deposited across the upper Illawarra Coal Measures and Wombarra Claystone as sediment was supplied by alluvial systems derived principally from the New England Fold Belt.

Within the Narrabeen Group, the Wombarra Claystone forms part of a broader alternation between sandstone-dominated and claystone-dominated units. The claystone formations, including the Wombarra Claystone, Stanwell Park Claystone and Bald Hill Claystone, generally have lower permeability than the intervening sandstone units and therefore act as aquitards within the Southern Coalfield's groundwater system. The sandstone formations, including the Coal Cliff, Scarborough and Bulgo Sandstones, generally have greater permeability and function as aquifers. This alternating sequence of relatively permeable sandstone and less permeable claystone influences the movement and storage of groundwater through the sedimentary succession.

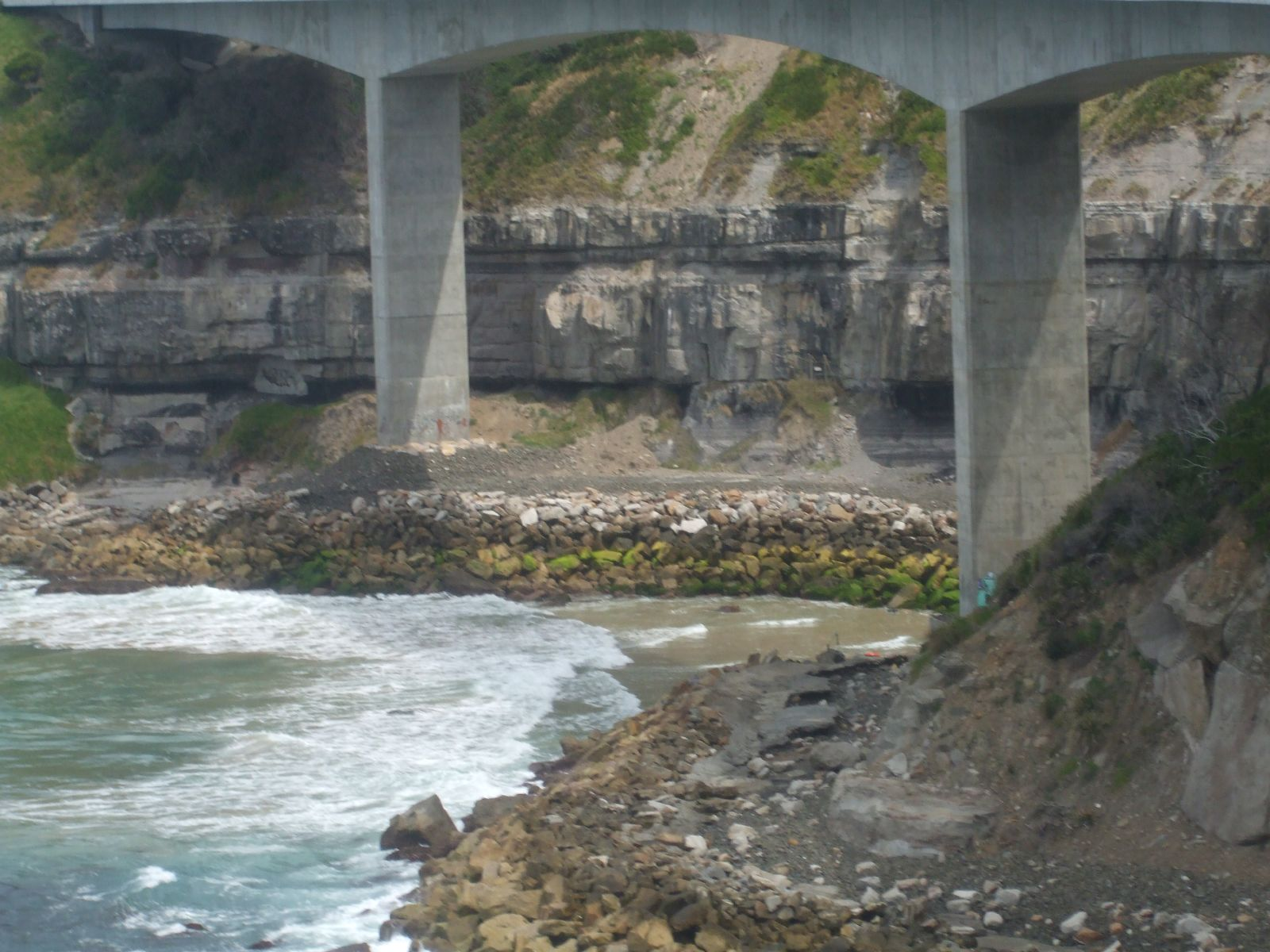
Wombarra Claystone exposed in the coastal cliffs beneath Sea Cliff Bridge, near Coalcliff.

The Wombarra Claystone also marks an important stage in the transition from the underlying Illawarra Coal Measures to the predominantly fluvial deposits of the Narrabeen Group. Following the termination of coal-forming conditions, sedimentation became increasingly dominated by alluvial systems, including extensive braided-fluvial and alluvial-fan environments. Volcanic sources to the east contributed distinctive green volcanolithic sediment to parts of the southern Sydney Basin, while sediment was also supplied from the New England and Lachlan Fold belts. These changing sediment sources and depositional environments contributed to the substantial lateral variation in the sandstone-to-claystone ratio within the Wombarra Claystone.

== Distribution ==
The Wombarra Claystone crops out from Coalcliff in the north to Macquarie Pass in the south, although it is not developed south of Macquarie Pass. South of Avon Dam, the unit either lenses out or becomes increasingly sandy and grades into the Kangaloon Sandstone. Its sandstone-rich character towards the southern and western parts of its distribution reflects lateral changes in the depositional environment and sediment supply within the Sydney Basin.

== See also ==
- Sydney Basin
- Bald Hill Claystone
- Scarborough Sandstone
- Narrabeen group
- Sea Cliff Bridge
