= Scarborough Sandstone =

Geologic formation in eastern Australia

- Stratigraphic range: Early-Mid Triassic; ~252–237 Ma
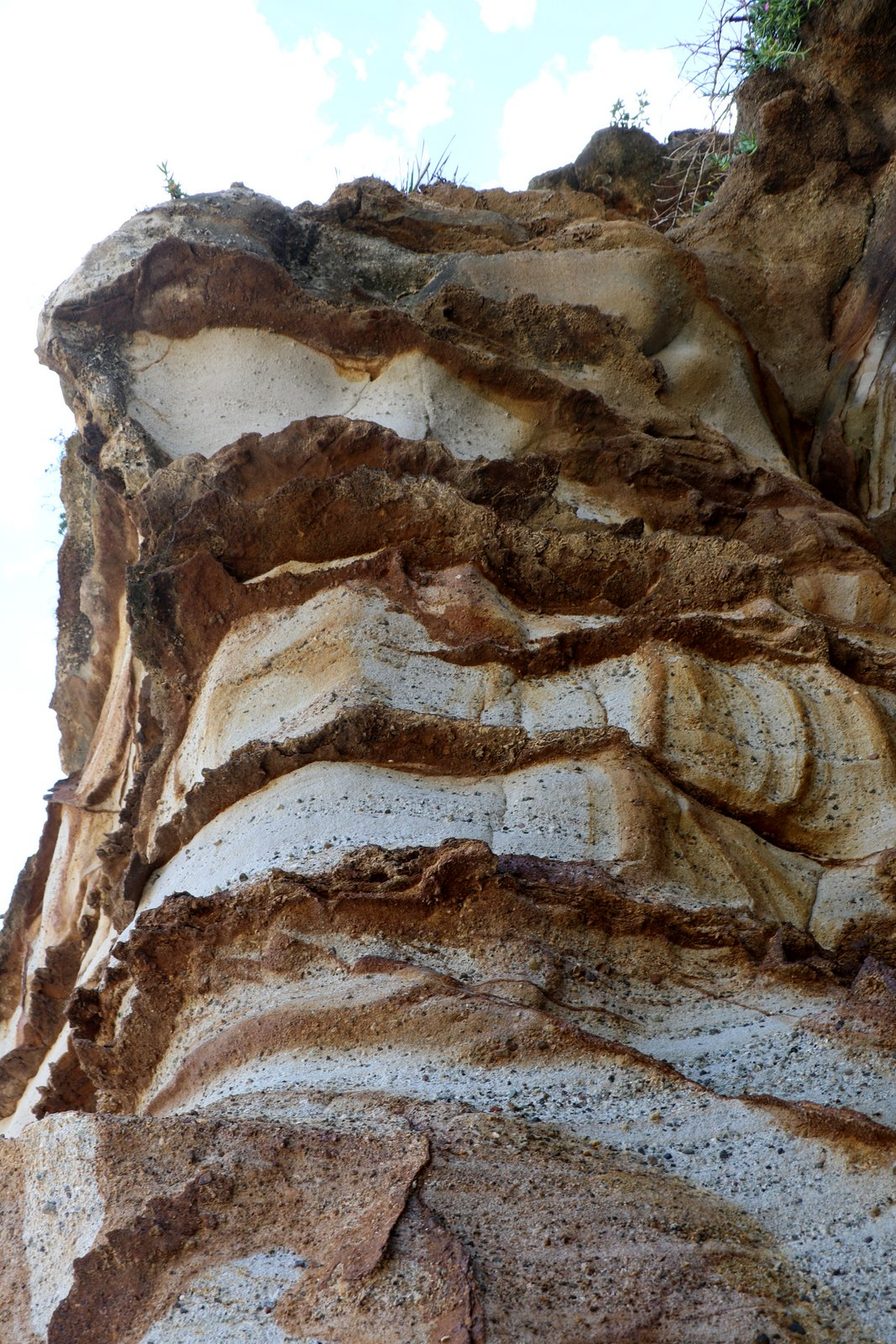
- Stanwell Park, Australia
- Type: Geological formation
- Unit of: Narrabeen Group
- Underlies: Wombarra Claystone
- Overlies: Stanwell Park Claystone
- Thickness: up to 26 metres (90 ft)

Lithology
- Primary: Sandstone

Location
- Region: New South Wales
- Country: Australia
- Extent: Sydney Basin

Type section
- Named for: Scarborough, New South Wales
- Location: Illawarra
- Country: Australia
- Thickness at type section: 27

Scarborough Sandstone is a geologic formation in the Sydney Basin in eastern Australia. Commonly seen in the Illawarra region, this stratum is up to 26 metres thick. Formed in the early Triassic, it is part of the Narrabeen Group of sedimentary rocks. This formation includes quartz-lithic sandstone, sometimes with pebbles.

== See also ==
- Sydney Basin
- Bald Hill Claystone
- Garie Formation
- Narrabeen group
