= Bald Hill (Australia) =

Hill on the Illawarra Range, New South Wales, Australia

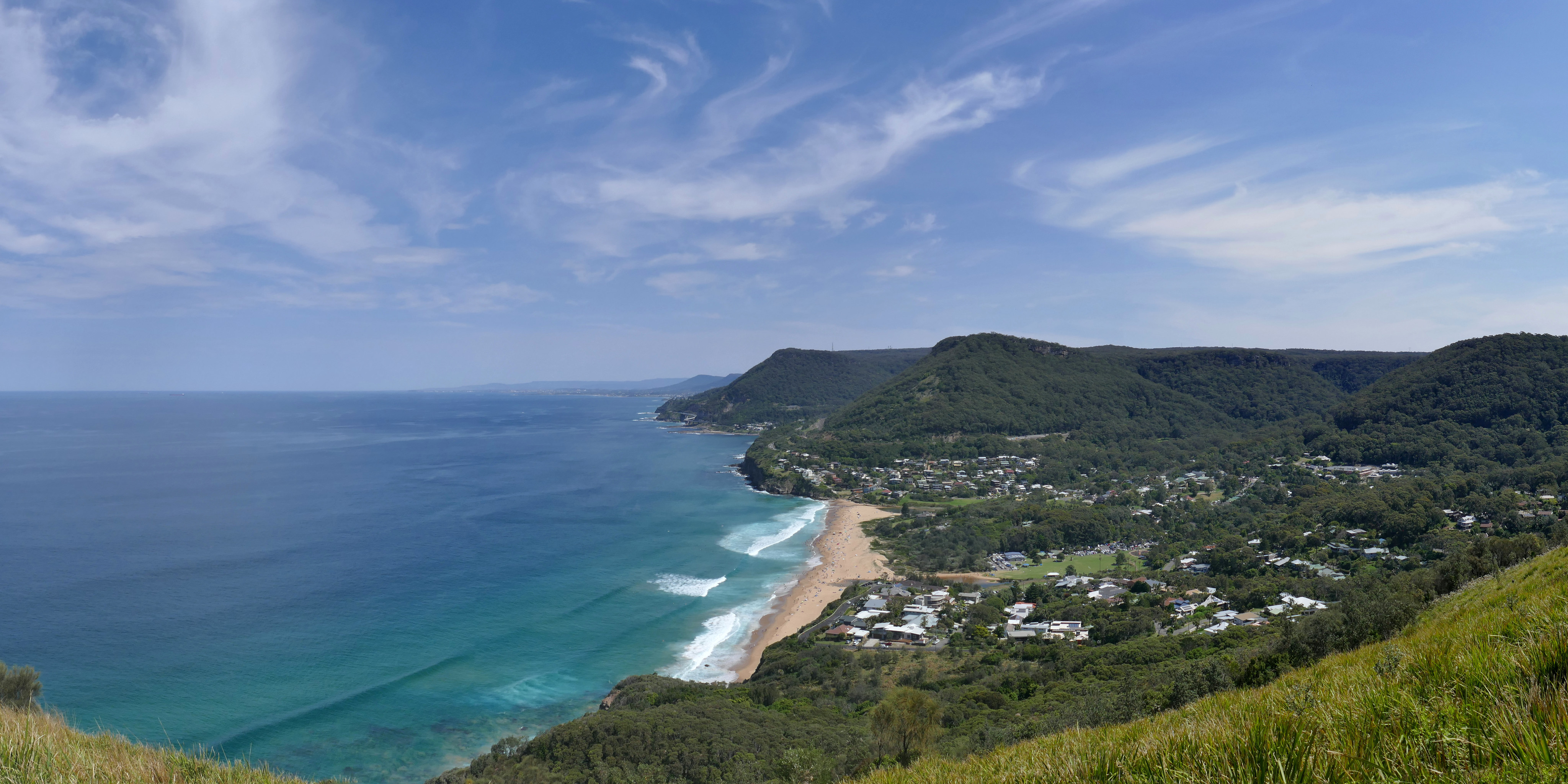
- Stanwell Park and its beach as seen from Bald Hill looking south towards the Sea Cliff Bridge and Wollongong.

Highest point
- Elevation: 180 m (590 ft)
- Coordinates: 34°13′25″S 150°59′34″E

Geography
- Location within New South Wales
- Location: New South Wales, Australia
- Parent range: Illawarra

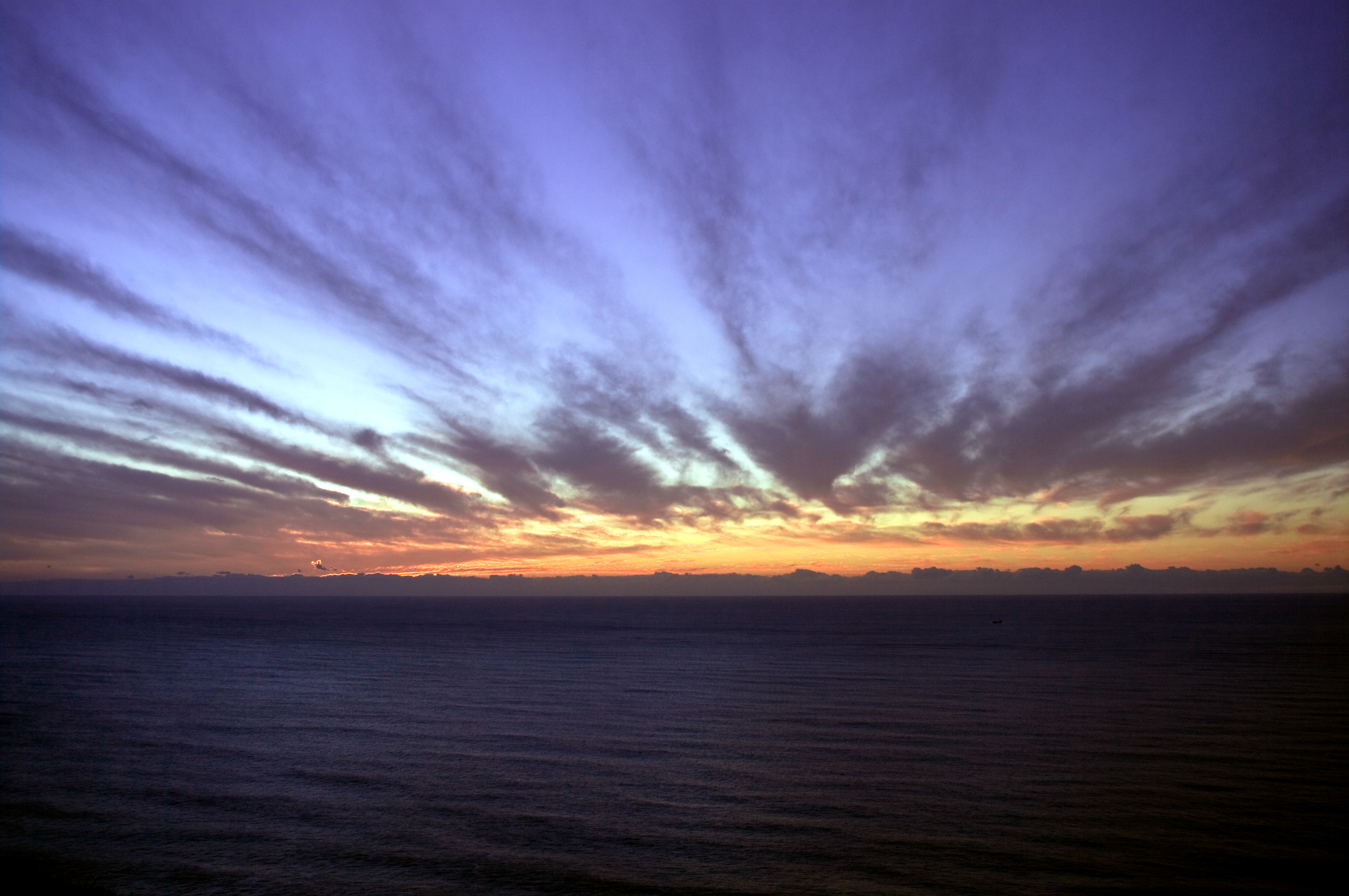
Sunrise at Bald Hill, NSW

Bald Hill is a hill on the Illawarra Range, in the state of New South Wales, Australia. With an elevation of approximately 180 metres (590 ft) AMSL, Bald Hill is one of the best known and most popular lookouts in the Illawarra region providing panoramic vistas across the Illawarra escarpment and over the Illawarra plain and the Tasman Sea of the South Pacific Ocean.

The nature reserve on the hill is internationally renowned as a major hang gliding and paragliding site. It was on the beach below Bald Hill that Lawrence Hargrave, an Australian pioneer of flight, experimented with box kites in the early part of the 20th century. A memorial cairn dedicated to Hargrave is located at the peak of the hill near the car park.

== Geography ==
The hill is actually a tall headland, forming the northern end of the Illawarra escarpment. Stony Batter, just north of Bald Hill, forms a sandstone outcrop peak to the coastal ridge and has equally good views, reached by a track from Bald Hill Lookout that enters the Royal National Park to a small way in. The coastal ridge continues north, forming the Otford and Bulgo hill formations; the escarpment itself turns into the white cliffs of the Royal National Park.

From Bald Hill Lookout there is a 360-degree view. Northwest is Stanwell Tops and Undola Ridge, which Bald Hill is the eastern tip of, and the Royal National Park. The hills of the Royal National Park make way in the northeast for Stony Batter, accessed via a short track. To the far north from Stony Batter and Bald Hill views of the Royal National Park's white cliffs are seen, and a sharp drop to the Tasman Sea lies to the east. To the south is Stanwell Park and Mount Mitchell, about 290 metres (950 ft) above sea level, and the Illawarra escarpment south to Saddleback Mountain and beyond to Jervis Bay.

== Stanwell Park Reserve and Bald Hill history ==
=== Aboriginal history ===
The traditional custodians of the land surrounding Bald Hill are the Australian Aboriginal Tharawal people.

=== European history ===
Bald Hill was granted to Matthew Gibbons in 1832 by Governor Bourke. Campbell Mitchell bought Bald Hill and Stanwell Park from Gibbons and in 1871; with Mitchell leasing the northern end of his land to Justice Hargrave, the father of Lawrence Hargrave. Justice Hargrave subsequently became entitled to 640 acres (260 ha) extending from Bald Hill down to Stanwell Creek. In 1872, Mitchell went bankrupt and was forced to sell his 1,325 acres (536 ha) of land to Justice Hargrave for £2,650. Justice Hargrave had ownership of Otford, Stanwell Park and the Coal Cliffs as far as Clifton. When Justice Hargrave died in 1885, his land was distributed between his children.

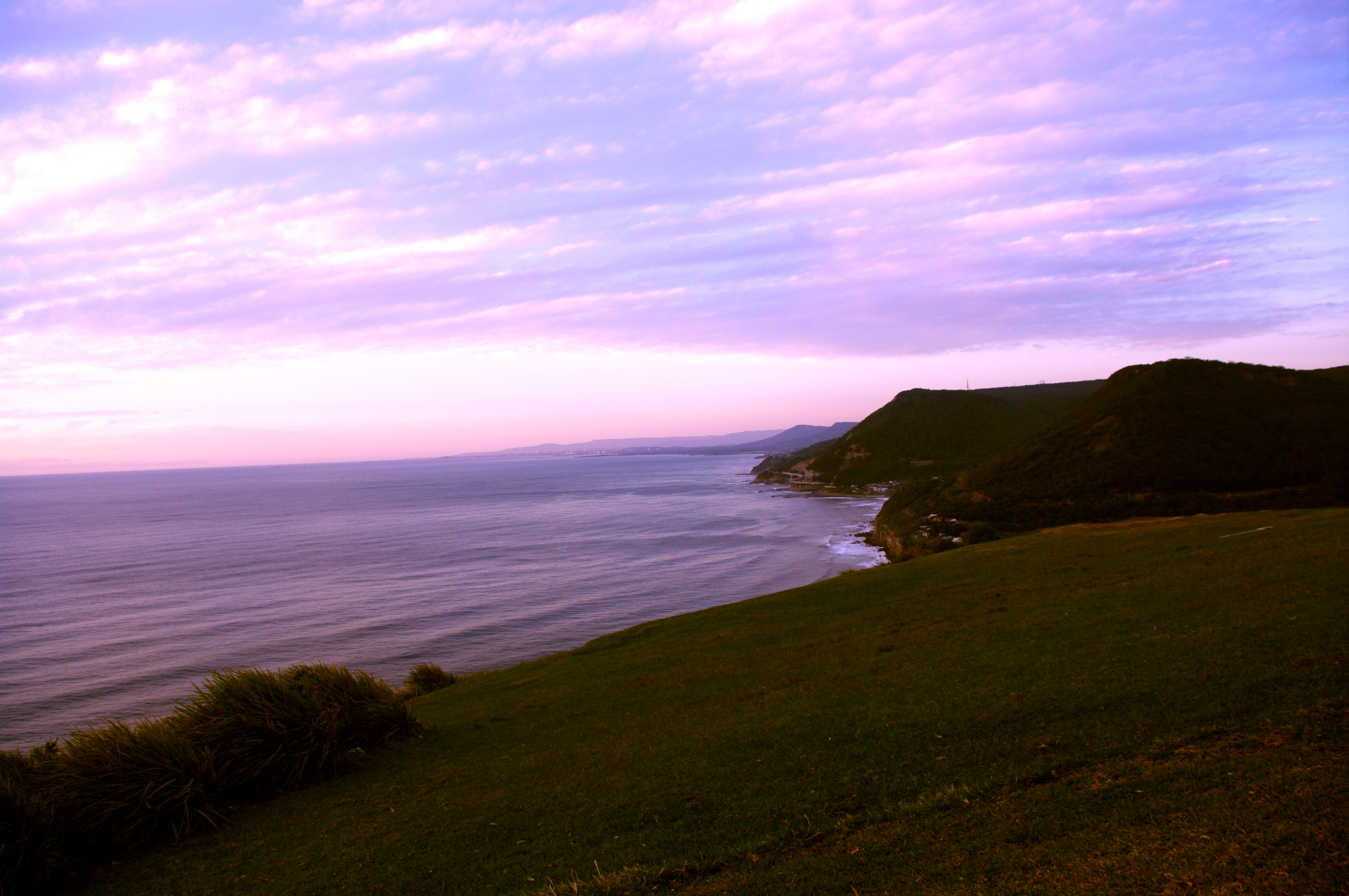
Sunrise with Sea Cliff Bridge Views, Bald Hill

Lawrence Hargrave lived at the house known as 'Hillcrest' between 1893 and 1899, after inheriting the property from his brother. Lawrence Hargrave created many of his monoplanes and cellular kites while at 'Hillcrest'. The 13.5 acres (5.5 ha) estate remained in the Hargrave family until 1940, when it was purchased by Colin Campbell and his wife. In 1949, Mrs Campbell donated the house and property to the State Trustees of the Temple Society of Australia who were to use the home for the aged and the sick. Hargrave's most successful and recognised achievement occurred on 12 November 1894 in which Hargrave was lifted 16 feet (4.9 m) into the air on Stanwell Park Beach by a series of four box kites that he had created. Hargrave's significant work on box kites had important consequences on wing design and the soon after creation of the airplane. Hargrave conducted his heavier-than-air flights on Stanwell Park Reserve Beach.

On 3 August 1940, the Lawrence Hargrave memorial was erected on Bald Hill. The monument was placed on Bald Hill to signify Hargrave's work in aeronautics and overlooks the scene of his experiments. The height of this location suggests altitude, as in flight; and the location was also considered appropriate due to the popularity of the site as a tourist destination. The sandstone memorial exhibits a bronze plaque, mounted beneath a bronze high relief portrait of Hargrave holding a box kite in a landscape background. The inscriptions on the memorial currently reads as follows:

"Lawrence Hargrave 1850-1915; Who's Pioneering Research in Aeronautics with engines, monoplanes and box kites, much of which was carried out at Stanwell Park, played a vital part in the development of the aeroplane. Erected by the Bulli Shire Council with the assistance of the Government of the Commonwealth of Australia and the Government of New South Wales and unveiled by his Excellency the Governor of New South Wales the RT. Hon. Lord Wakehurst K.C.M.G. on August 3rd 1940."

== Tourist attraction ==
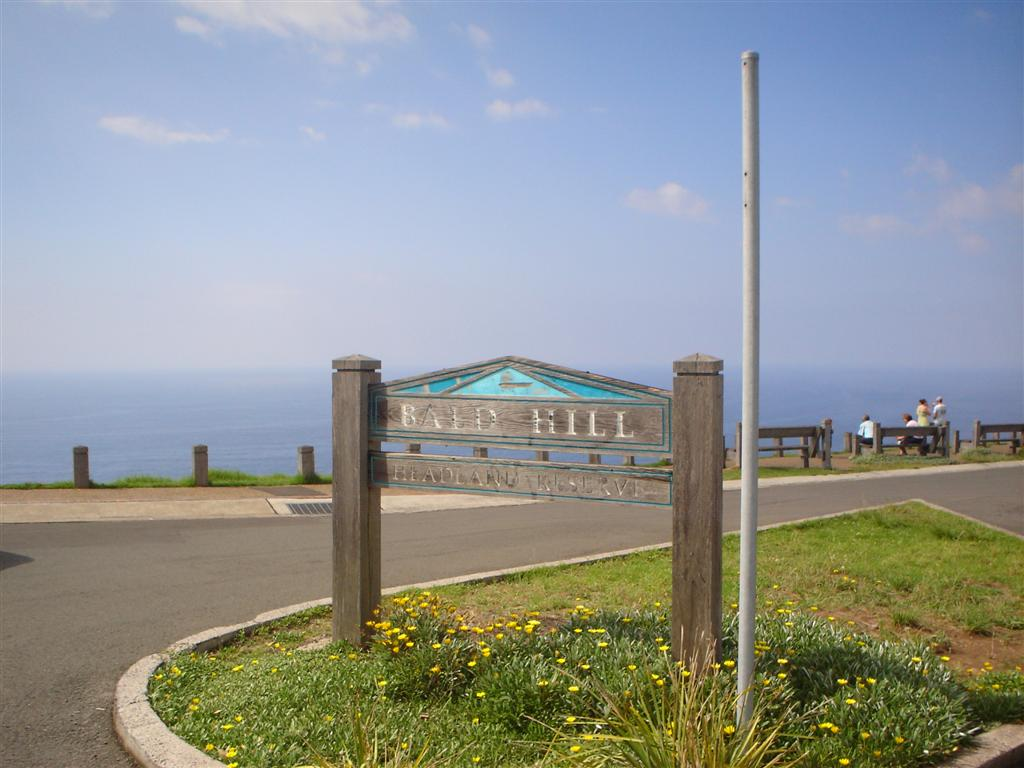
Sign at Bald Hill Lookout.

Bald Hill is a major tourist destination commonly visited for sight seeing, hang gliding and paragliding. In September 2000 a hang glider pilot and paraglider pilot died after colliding over Bald Hill, which resulted in a coronial enquiry and the adoption of a management plan over Bald Hill in May 2003. Significant improvements to the management of hang gliding and paragliding activities have been undertaken since. Bald Hill is also one of the most popular motorcycle stops for motorcycle enthusiasts in New South Wales. Bald Hill (Lawrence Hargrave Memorial Park) is listed in the Wollongong Local Environment Plan as a heritage item of state significance. It is also listed in the Illawarra Regional Environmental Plan as a heritage item.

The name is becoming rather a misnomer, for growth of weeds and grasses has become quite prevalent on its mid slopes from its base. There are toilet and carpark facilities and several sculptures, notably one depicting a hang glider gliding above the escarpment. Motorbike tour groups use the reserve as a stop on their tours and nearby Otford has a similar lookout. Access to the lookout is by way of Lawrence Hargrave Drive from either Stanwell Tops, Otford or Stanwell Park. There is currently no major track to the lookout, although there is a small walking track from Chellow Dene Avenue in Stanwell Park to the top of the hill. In 2013, the Wollongong City Council announced plans to proceed with an A$5.3 million plan to redevelop Bald Hill.

In November each year, the Stanwell Park Festival of Flight is celebrated to commemorate the anniversary of Hargrave's achievements.

== See also ==
- Sea Cliff Bridge, a nearby tourist spot
