= Illawarra (disambiguation) =

Illawarra is region in New South Wales, Australia.

Illawarra may also refer to:

- Illawarra (spider), a genus of spider
- Illawarra cattle, breed of dairy cattle
- Illawarra Coke Company, in Coalcliff and Coledale, New South Wales, Australia
- Illawarra escarpment, south of Sydney, Australia
- Illawarra flame tree, a species of tree scientifically classified as Brachychiton acerifolius
- Illawarra Hawks, a National Basketball League team
- Illawarra Mercury, a daily newspaper serving the Illawarra region
- Illawarra Steelers, the half of the St. George Illawarra Dragons (referred to below) joint venture that originates from the Illawarra region of New South Wales
- Lake Illawarra, near Wollongong, New South Wales, Australia
- Illawarra, a locality near Longford, Tasmania

== See also ==
- T4 Eastern Suburbs & Illawarra Line, a suburban railway line in Sydney, Australia
- Illawarra railway line, an intercity railway line in New South Wales, Australia
- St George Illawarra Dragons, Australian rugby league football team
- SS Lake Illawarra, bulk carrier that collided with a pylon on Tasman Bridge in 1975
