= Lawrence Hargrave Drive =

Road in New South Wales, Australia

Lawrence Hargrave Drive New South Wales
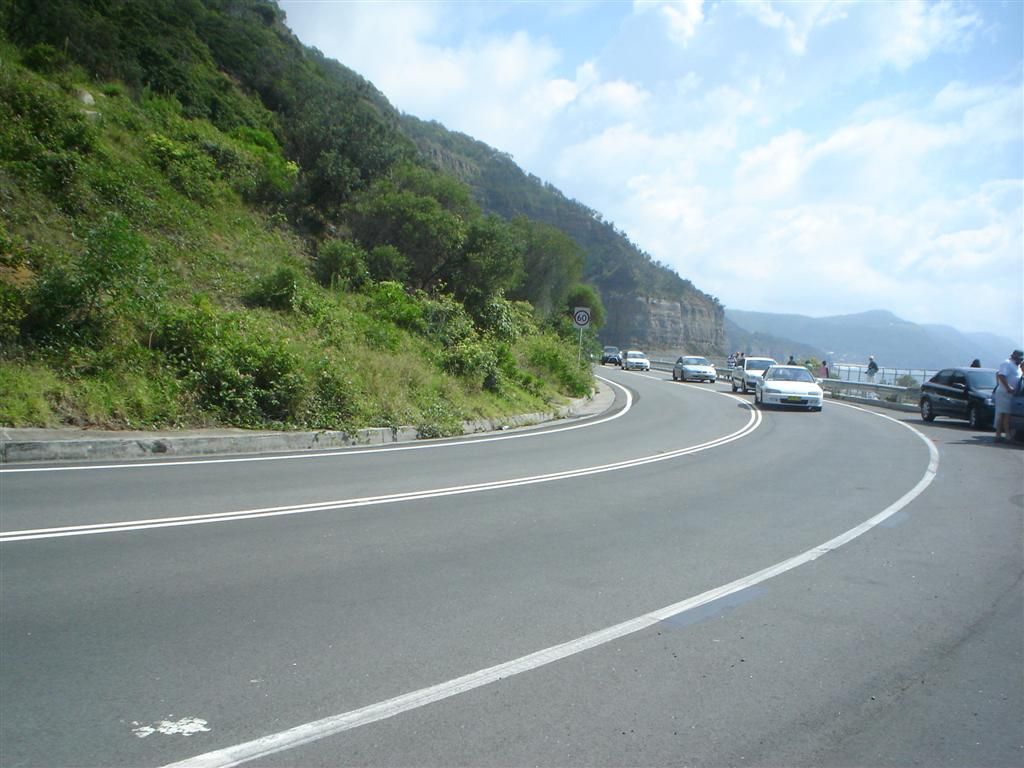
- Lawrence Hargrave Drive
- Coordinates: 34.2031°S 150.9678°E (North end); 34.3227°S 150.9134°E (South end)

General information
- Type: Road
- Length: 19.5 km (12 mi)
- Gazetted: August 1928

Major junctions
- North end: Old Princes Highway; Helensburgh, New South Wales
- Lady Wakehurst Drive
- South end: Princes Highway; Thirroul, New South Wales

Location(s)
- Major suburbs: Stanwell Park, Coalcliff, Clifton, Austinmer

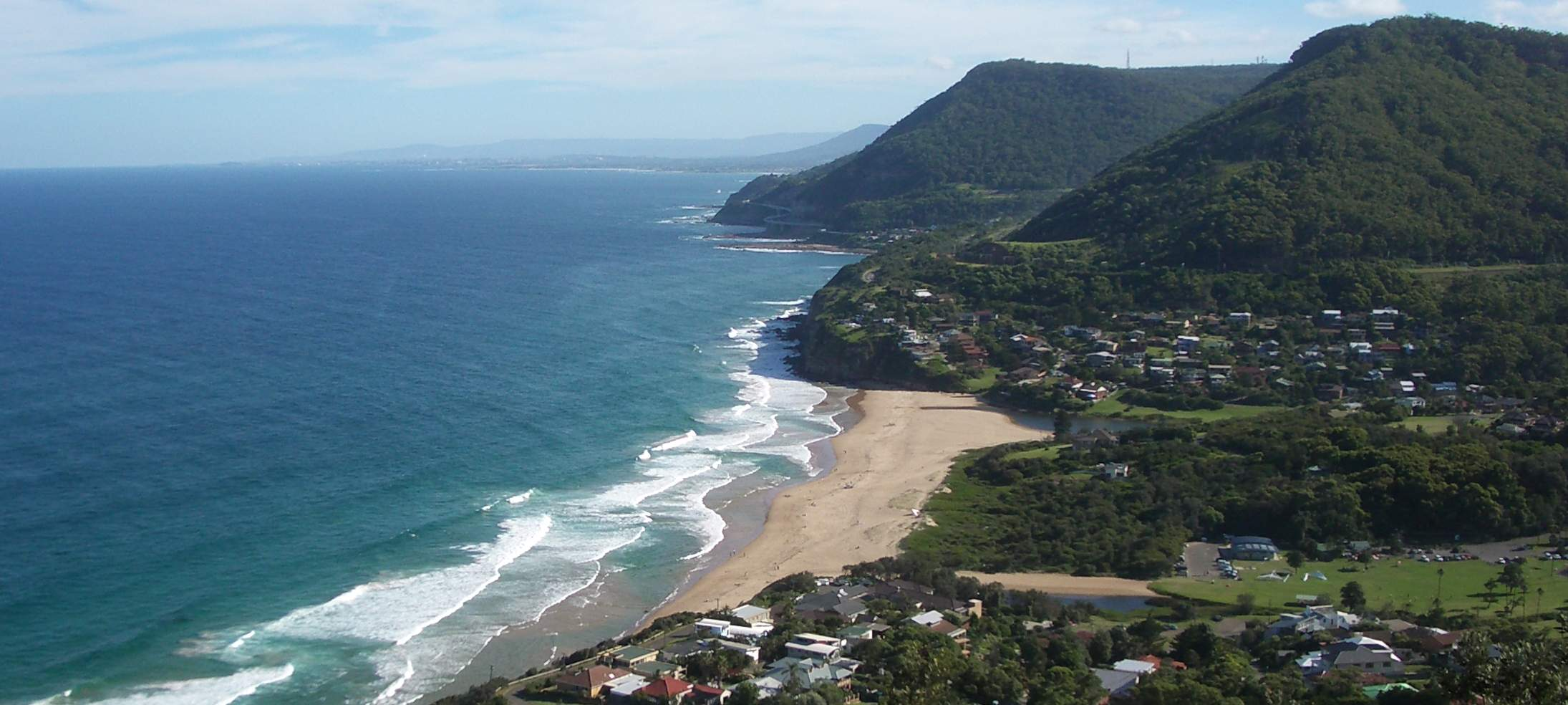
View from Bald Hill lookout, with Lawrence Hargrave Drive visible following the coast towards Wollongong and the Sea Cliff Bridge on the second headland.

Lawrence Hargrave Drive, part of the Grand Pacific Drive, is a scenic coastal road and popular tourist drive connecting the northernmost suburbs of Wollongong, New South Wales, Australia, to Wollongong, in the south, and Sydney, in the north across the scenic Sea Cliff Bridges. It was named after Lawrence Hargrave, an Australian aviation pioneer who lived nearby.

== Route ==
The road begins at the Old Princes Highway, Helensburgh (Princes Motorway exit) and passes through Stanwell Tops to descend the steep Illawarra Escarpment at Bald Hill, the site of a spectacular lookout and hang gliding area. The road then passes south through Stanwell Park and Coalcliff to cross the Sea Cliff Bridge and adjoining Lawrence Hargrave Drive Bridge. Together, the Sea Cliff Bridge and Lawrence Hargrave Drive Bridge construction were completed in December 2005, replacing the former cliff-hugging route which was prone to rockfalls and consequent closures. Remnants of the former road can still be seen to this day, including some of the guard rail and most of the road section which is now overgrown with trees and ridden with boulders and rocks that have fallen freely since the roads closure, essentially acting as a ditch.

The road then winds its way through the coastal villages of Clifton, Scarborough, Wombarra, Coledale, Austinmer and finally Thirroul where it meets the Princes Highway at the bottom of Bulli Pass.

== History ==
The road was originally constructed in the 1870s as Lower Coast Road. It was renamed Lawrence Hargrave Drive after Lawrence Hargrave, an Australian aviation pioneer and explorer who had a house at Stanwell Park and flew his devices from Bald Hill, on 18 December 1946.

The passing of the Main Roads Act of 1924 through the Parliament of New South Wales provided for the declaration of Main Roads, roads partially funded by the State government through the Main Roads Board (later Transport for NSW). Main Road No. 185 was declared along Lower Coast Road on 8 August 1928, from the intersection with Princes Highway in "The Dummies", via Bald Hill, Stanwell Park, Clifton, Austinmer, and Thirroul to the intersection with Princes Highway at the foot of Bull Pass; with the passing of the Main Roads (Amendment) Act of 1929 to provide for additional declarations of State Highways and Trunk Roads, this was amended to Main Road 185 on 8 April 1929. Main Road 185 was later extended north along the former Princes Highway alignment to Waterfall on 25 October 2002.

The passing of the Roads Act of 1993 updated road classifications and the way they could be declared within New South Wales. Under this act, Lawrence Hargrave Drive retains its declaration as part of Main Road 185.

== Major intersections ==
Lawrence Hargrave Drive is entirely contained within the City of Wollongong local government area.

Location	km	mi	Destinations	Notes
Helensburgh	0.0	0.0	Princes Highway – Waterfall, Bulli, Wollongong	Northern terminus of road
Helensburgh	0.0	0.0	Princes Motorway (M1) – Heathcote, Mount Pleasant, Dapto, Kiama	Southbound exit and entrance only
Stanwell Tops	3.4	2.1	South Coast railway line	
Stanwell Tops	3.9	2.4	Lady Wakehurst Drive – Otford, Lilyvale	
Coalcliff	8.5– 8.8	5.3– 5.5	Lawrence Hargrave Drive Bridge	
Clifton	9.0– 9.6	5.6– 6.0	Sea Cliff Bridge	
Thirroul	18.5	11.5	South Coast railway line	
Thirroul–Bulli boundary	19.5	12.1	Princes Highway (B65) – Fairy Meadow, Wollongong	Southern terminus of road
Incomplete access; Route transition

== See also ==
- Bald Hill
- Bulli Pass
- Grand Pacific Drive
- Illawarra escarpment
