= Clifton railway station, New South Wales =

Former railway station in New South Wales, Australia

Clifton

General information
- Location: Clifton School Parade, Clifton; New South Wales; Australia
- Coordinates: 34°15′32″S 150°58′08″E
- Line: South Coast
- Distance: 61.858 km (38.437 mi) from Central
- Platforms: 1 (1 side)
- Tracks: 1

Construction
- Structure type: Ground

Other information
- Status: Demolished

History
- Opened: 3 October 1888 (137 years ago)
- Closed: 15 August 1915 (111 years ago) (passenger service)
- Former names: North Clifton (1888)

Services
Preceding station	Former services	Following station
Scarborough towards Bomaderry	South Coast Line	Coalcliff towards Sydney
Location

Clifton railway station was a regional railway station located on the South Coast line, serving the Illawarra town of Clifton.

== History ==
Clifton station opened on 3 October 1888 as North Clifton, and was renamed Clifton by 1 January 1889. Although the station was located closer to the business centre of the adjoining towns of Clifton and Scarborough, the Railway Commissioners did not provide frequent services. This meant that deliveries for residents, such as newspapers, were thrown from mail and postal trains when passing the station resulting in damaged goods constantly littering the trackside.

On the morning of 2 August 1889, a fire completely destroyed the station building and damaged the railway station. Telegraph communication which ran through the building was cut, and had to be united from either side to restore unbroken communication along the railway line.

Passenger services to Clifton station ceased on 15 August 1915, and the station was abandoned until it was reopened as an unadvertised miners only platform on 4 July 1934. It was closed again at a later date.

== Description ==
The original station consisted of a weatherboard station building holding a booking office, a general waiting room as well as a ladies' waiting room. These were all burnt down in the 1889 fire.
