= Stanwell Park Claystone =

Geologic formation in Australia

- Stratigraphic range: Early-Mid Triassic; ~252–237 Ma
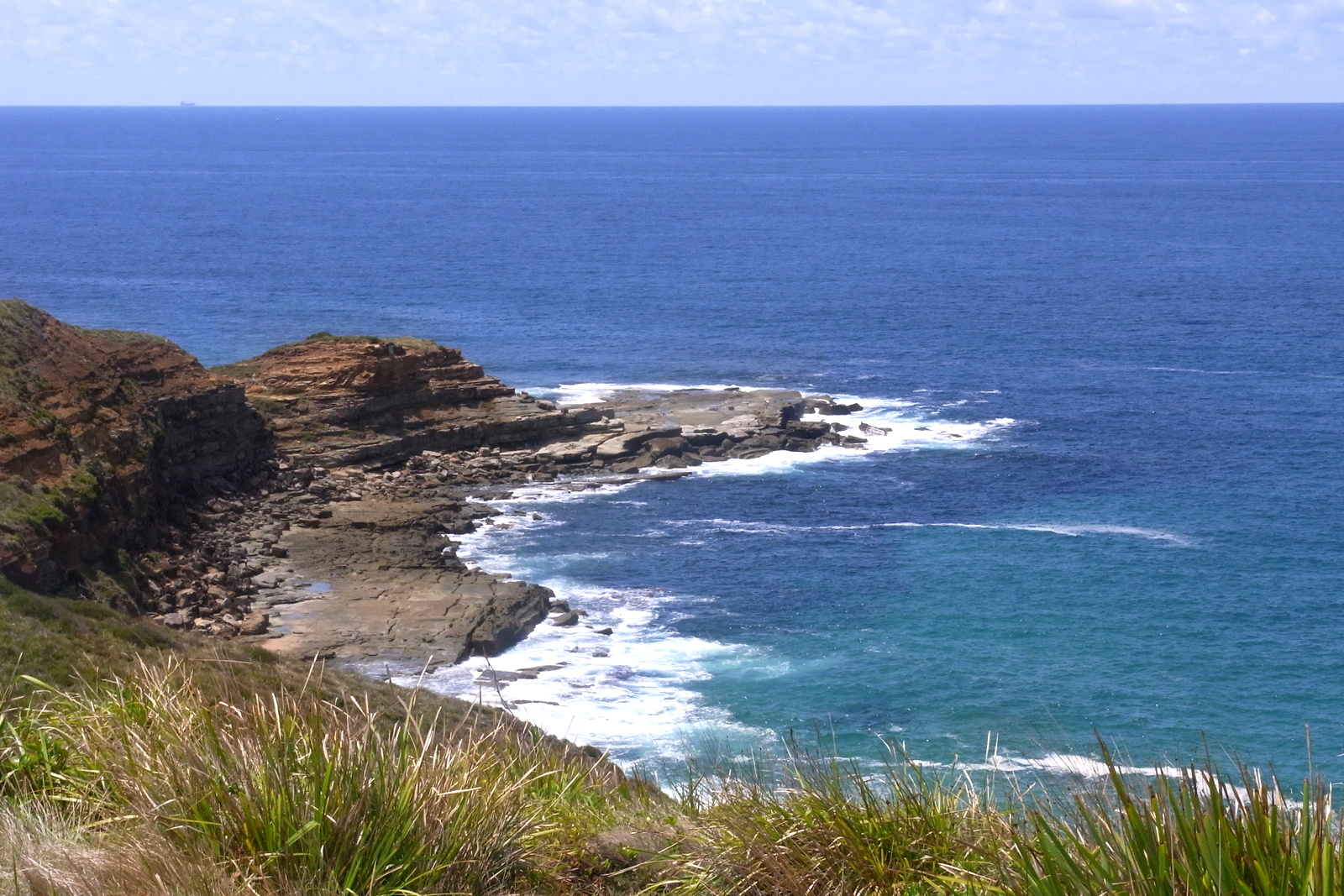
- Royal National Park, Australia
- Type: Geological formation
- Unit of: Narrabeen Group
- Underlies: Scarborough Sandstone
- Overlies: Bulgo Sandstone
- Thickness: up to 79 metres (260 ft)

Lithology
- Primary: Shale
- Other: Sandstone

Location
- Region: New South Wales
- Country: Australia
- Extent: Sydney Basin

Type section
- Named for: Stanwell Park, New South Wales
- Location: Illawarra
- Country: Australia
- Thickness at type section: 79

Stanwell Park Claystone is a geologic formation in the Sydney Basin in eastern Australia. Commonly seen in the Illawarra region, this stratum is up to 79 metres thick. Formed in the early Triassic, it is part of the Narrabeen Group of sedimentary rocks.This formation includes red, green and grey shale with quartz-lithic sandstone.

== See also ==
- Sydney Basin
- Scarborough Sandstone
- Garie Formation
- Narrabeen group
