= Sea Cliff Bridge =

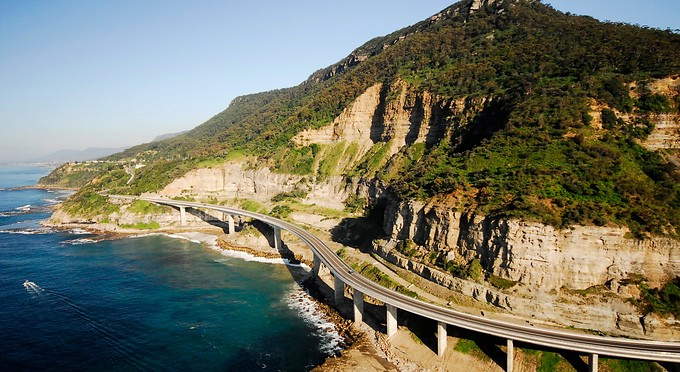
- The Sea Cliff Bridge viewed from the air
- Coordinates: 34°15′14″S 150°58′26″E
- Carries: Lawrence Hargrave Drive (also known as the Grand Pacific Drive): Motor vehicles; Pedestrians; Bicycles
- Crosses: Rockface on the Illawarra escarpment/Tasman Sea
- Locale: Coalcliff, New South Wales, Australia
- Begins: Coalcliff
- Ends: Clifton, New South Wales, Australia
- Other name: Lawrence Hargrave Drive Bridge
- Named for: Lawrence Hargrave
- Owner: Transport for NSW

Characteristics
- Design: 1. Balanced off-shore parallel-to-coast cantilever bridge (Sea Cliff Bridge); 2. Incremental launching girder bridge (Lawrence Hargrave Drive Bridge)
- Material: Steel reinforced concrete
- Total length: 1. 455.6 metres (1,495 ft) (Sea Cliff Bridge); 2. 210 metres (690 ft) (Lawrence Hargrave Drive Bridge)
- Width: 6.3 metres (21 ft) at its widest point
- Height: 41 metres (135 ft) at highest point
- Longest span: 1. 3 x 108 metres (354 ft) (Sea Cliff Bridge); 2. 5 x 31 metres (102 ft) (Lawrence Hargrave Drive Bridge)
- No. of spans: 1. 5 (Sea Cliff Bridge); 2. 7 (Lawrence Hargrave Drive Bridge)
- No. of lanes: 2

History
- Contracted lead designer: Maunsell Australia
- Engineering design by: Coffey Geosciences
- Constructed by: Barclay Mowlem
- Construction end: 9 December 2005
- Construction cost: A$52 million
- Inaugurated: 11 December 2005 by Morris Iemma, NSW Premier

Location
- Interactive map of Sea Cliff Bridge

The Sea Cliff Bridge, together with the adjoining Lawrence Hargrave Drive Bridge, are two road bridges that carry the scenic Lawrence Hargrave Drive across the rockface on the Illawarra escarpment, located in the northern Illawarra region of New South Wales, Australia. The balanced cantilever and incremental launching girder bridges link the coastal villages of Coalcliff and Clifton and carry two lanes of traffic, and a pedestrian walkway.

The Sea Cliff Bridge was named by Makenzie Russell, who at the time was an eleven-year-old student, following a naming competition opened to local primary school students. The Lawrence Hargrave Drive Bridge and the Lawrence Hargrave Drive are named in honour of Lawrence Hargrave, an Australian engineer, explorer, astronomer, inventor and aeronautical pioneer.

== History ==
The Sea Cliff Bridge replaced a section of Lawrence Hargrave Drive that was permanently closed in August 2003 due to regular rock falls. A public outcry emerged over the road closure as Lawrence Hargrave Drive is the only road directly linking Coalcliff, Stanwell Park, Otford and Helensburgh to the northern suburbs of Wollongong.

== Description ==
The A$52 million 450-metre-long (1,476 ft) bridges brace against the Tasman Sea, up to 70 metres (230 ft) east of the original alignment of Lawrence Hargrave Drive. Completed in 2005, the Sea Cliff Bridge structure comprises a haunched box girder composed of prestressed concrete that was constructed using the balanced cantilever method, with five spans. Adjoining the Sea Cliff Bridge is the 210-metre-long (689 ft) Lawrence Hargrave Drive Bridge – often not considered as two separate bridges. This latter girder bridge that was constructed using the incremental launching method, with seven spans, ranging from 24 to 31 metres (79 to 102 ft), shares a common pier with the Sea Cliff Bridge.

The bridges incorporate two traffic lanes of 3.5 to 3.8 metres (11 to 12 ft) and a 2.5-metre (8 ft) pedestrian pathway. Cyclists are allowed to use the traffic lanes and there are shoulders on either side of the road of approximately 1.2 metres (4 ft) width.

The bridges were officially opened by the NSW Premier Morris Iemma on 11 December 2005, and were met with public approval and increased business for the area's tourism industry.

The bridges sit in a harsh marine environment as it directly faces the open ocean and is affected by high sea swell splashing. It is well attested that concrete structures in such environments are especially susceptible to chloride induced corrosion of the steel reinforcement, which can eventually lead to expensive repair works and significantly decrease the life of the structure.

=== Tourism ===
An hour south of Sydney, the bridges have been a major tourist spot since they opened in 2005. The area adjacent to the bridges feature a scenic walkway surrounded by rocky cliffs that is a popular location for love padlocks.

Pioneer Walks published the route to the lookout and encouraged spectators to participate in an "unofficial walk with no safety precautions in place". On 30 September 2018, a 24-year-old man hiked to a lookout on a cliff overlooking the bridges, where the ground beneath him gave way and he slid 20 metres (70 ft) to the cliff’s edge, where he then plummeted 40 metres (130 ft) to his death.

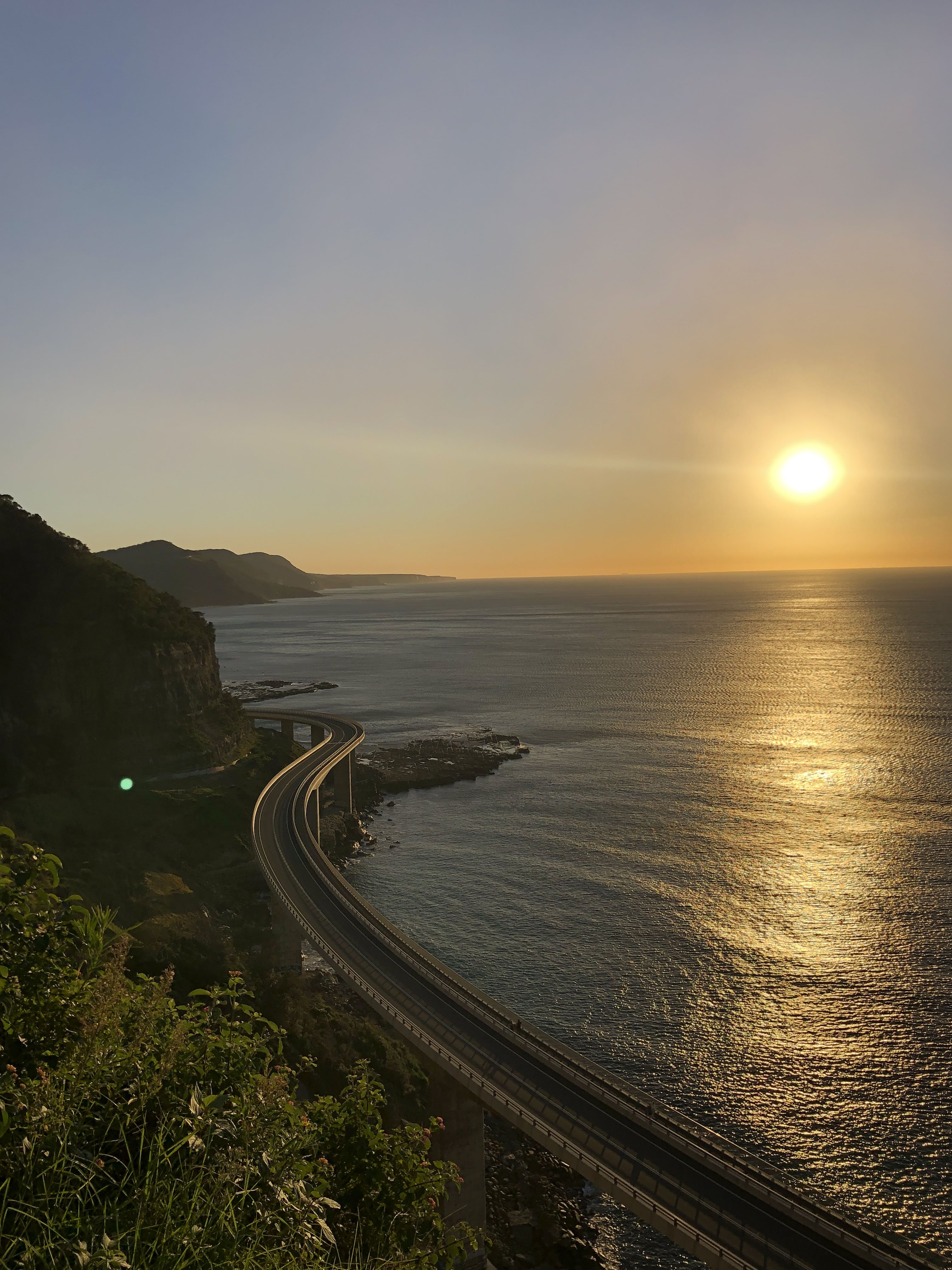
Sea Cliff Bridge in May 2020

== In popular media ==
The Sea Cliff Bridge and adjoining Lawrence Hargrave Drive Bridge were featured in a range of media including:

- a joint 2007 Ferrari/Shell television advertisement that was shown in Australia and many other countries.
- a VE Holden Commodore commercial
- the video game, Forza Horizon 3, where players can race over the bridge
- in Guy Sebastian's music video for the song "Choir", where he is seen walking under the Sea Cliff Bridge

== Gallery ==
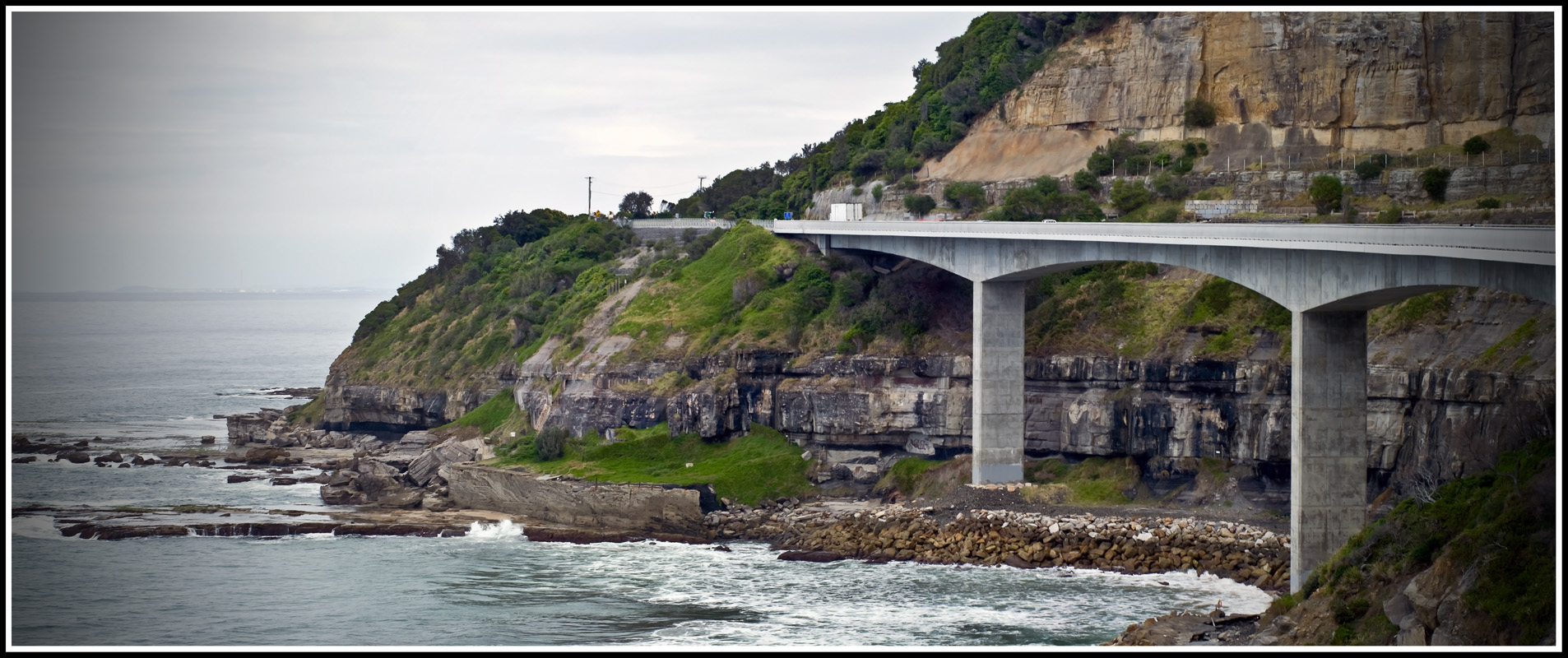
Sea Cliff Bridge looking south

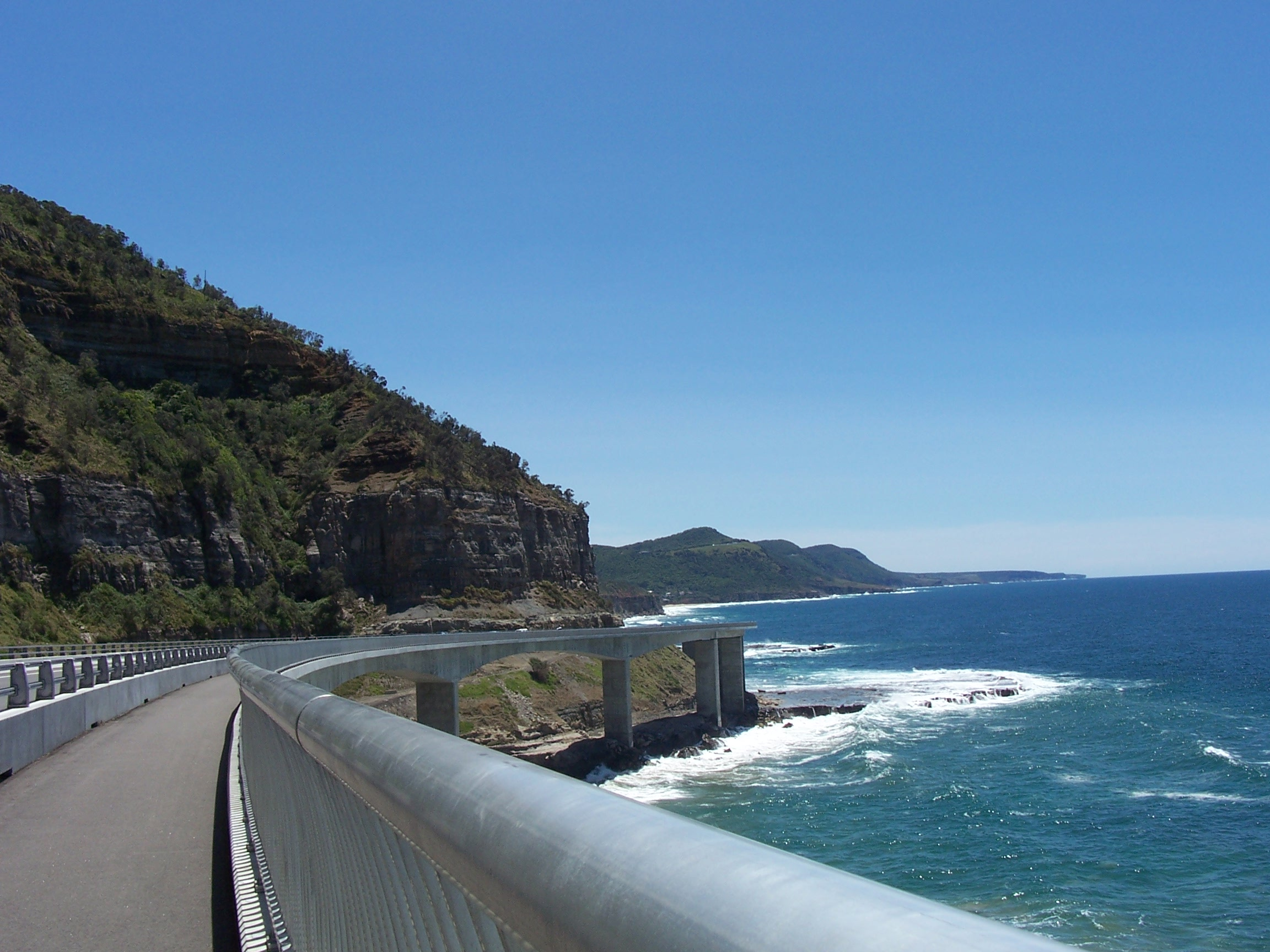
The footpath on Sea Cliff Bridge

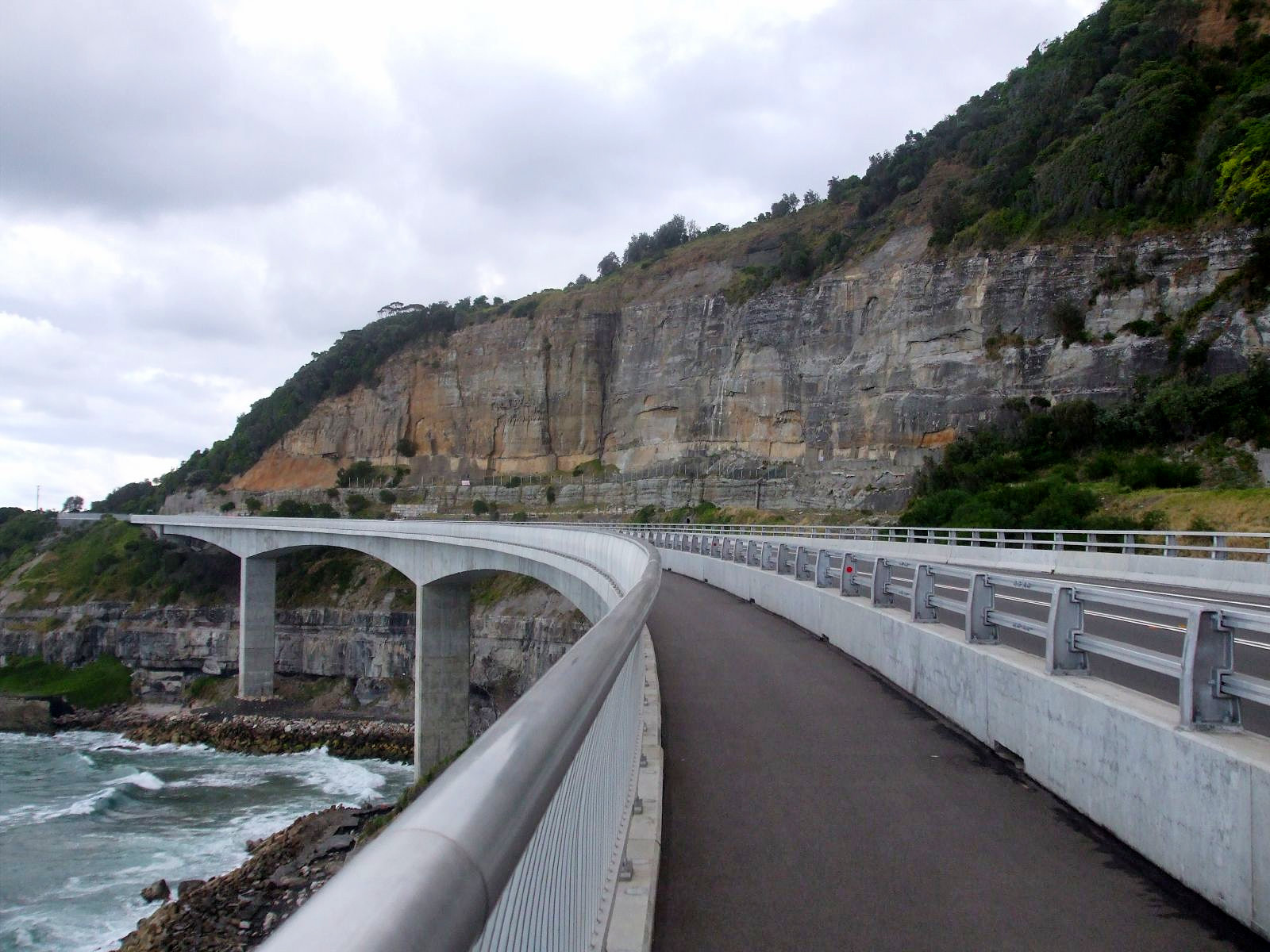
A photo taken from road level

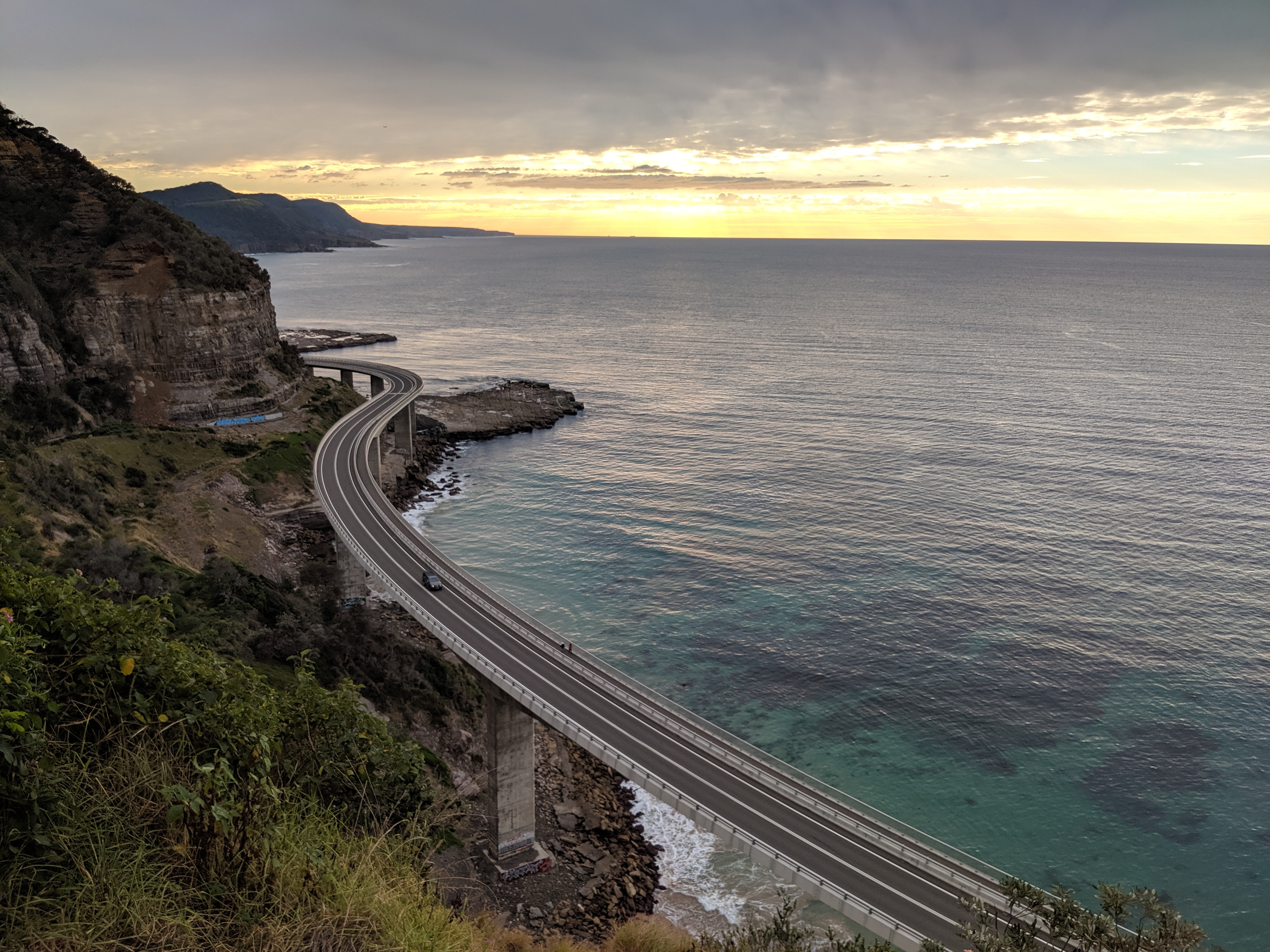
Looking down onto Sea Cliff Bridge from the south

== See also ==
- List of bridges in Australia
- Bald Hill, a nearby lookout spot
