= Grand Pacific Drive =

Scenic drive in New South Wales, Australia

Grand Pacific Drive New South Wales

General information
- Type: Road
- Length: 140 km (87 mi)

Location(s)
- Region: South Coast; Shoalhaven; Southern Highlands; Illawarra
- LGA(s): City of Wollongong; Municipality of Kiama; City of Shellharbour; Wingecarribee Shire
- Major suburbs: Wollongong; Shellharbour; Kiama; Shoalhaven; Southern Highlands; Eurobodalla; Sapphire Coast

The Grand Pacific Drive is a scenic drive in New South Wales, Australia, which starts in the Royal National Park, crosses the Sea Cliff Bridge and continues through Wollongong, Shellharbour, Kiama in the Shoalhaven region, and Nowra on a total length of 140 kilometres (87 mi). The route also includes parts of the Southern Highlands.

== History ==
Federal tourism minister Martin Ferguson praised the Grand Pacific Drive in 2012 when he presented new signage to promote tourism attractions. By that point the drive had brought about positive economic indications for the area such as a 20 percent increase in accommodation revenue, a 31.6 percent increase in international visitors to the region, a four percent rise in domestic visitation, the region also saw increased consumer spending of $283 million by 3.3 million people.

Due to the spike in tourism levels, traffic measures such as a road toll, reduced parking on weekends or a reduction in curves that slow down traffic were proposed. A proposal to build a bypass from Bulli to Thirroul via the Sandon Point housing estate was ruled out. Roads and Maritime Services undertook a consultation in 2019 but ultimately did not proceed with any measure.

Wollongong City Council has embarked on a multi-year project to develop a 60-kilometre (37 mi) walking trail from the Royal National Park to the Lake Illawarra, the plan involves improving bus shelters, upgrading car parks, tree planting and renewal of footpaths. Wollongong City Council has partnered with Transport for NSW to plan and implement this project. The Grand Pacific Walk runs alongside the Grand Pacific Drive.

=== Promotion ===
From June to August 2025, a campaign named Go Grand was launched which promoted tourism around the Grand Pacific Drive. The campaign highlighted themes such as Grand Experiences, Grand Flavours, Grand Nature and Grand Stays.

== Attractions ==
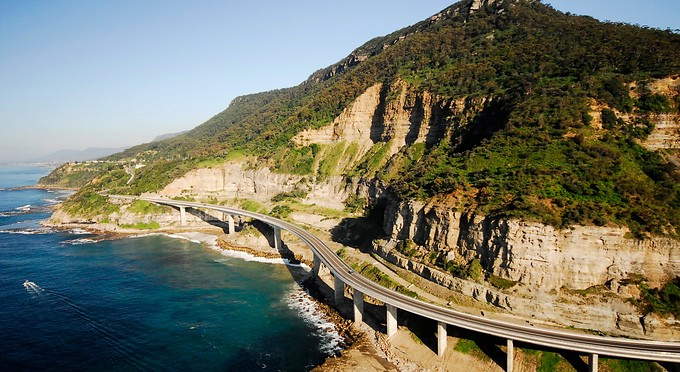
The Sea Cliff Bridge

20 kilometres (12 mi) north of Wollongong on the Grand Pacific Drive is the Sea Cliff Bridge which runs for 665 metres (0.413 mi) with views of the ocean. This bridge was commissioned in August 2003 and opened on 11 December 2005 as the section of Lawrence Hargrave Drive that originally ran along this cliff was dangerous. Tourism is at its peak from May to September each year. Along with the Sea Cliff Bridge, the Lawrence Hargrave Drive Bridge also serves traffic needs in the South Coast and runs for 210 metres (0.13 mi). Both of the bridges have pedestrian and cycling lanes in addition to lanes for traffic. The name Sea Cliff Bridge was coined by Makenzie Russell, an 11 year old student in the region.

== Reception ==
In 2026, the Grand Pacific Drive was rated the second most pet-friendly road trip in Australia, gaining a total score of 78.8 out of 100 in the methodology used by ROLLiN' Car Insurance. ROLLiN' also measured factors such as the experience and sharability, comfort and environment, pet safety and pet amenities.

ROLLiN' also ranked this drive number five on their list of best road trips for food options. The survey also measured the beast road trips for the most trendy food stops, most food stops per kilometre, best-rated food stops and least options.

Insurance provider iSelect ranked the drive number seventh for solo drives, and sixth for families, out of 20 road trips.
