= Clifton, New South Wales =

Clifton
- Suburb
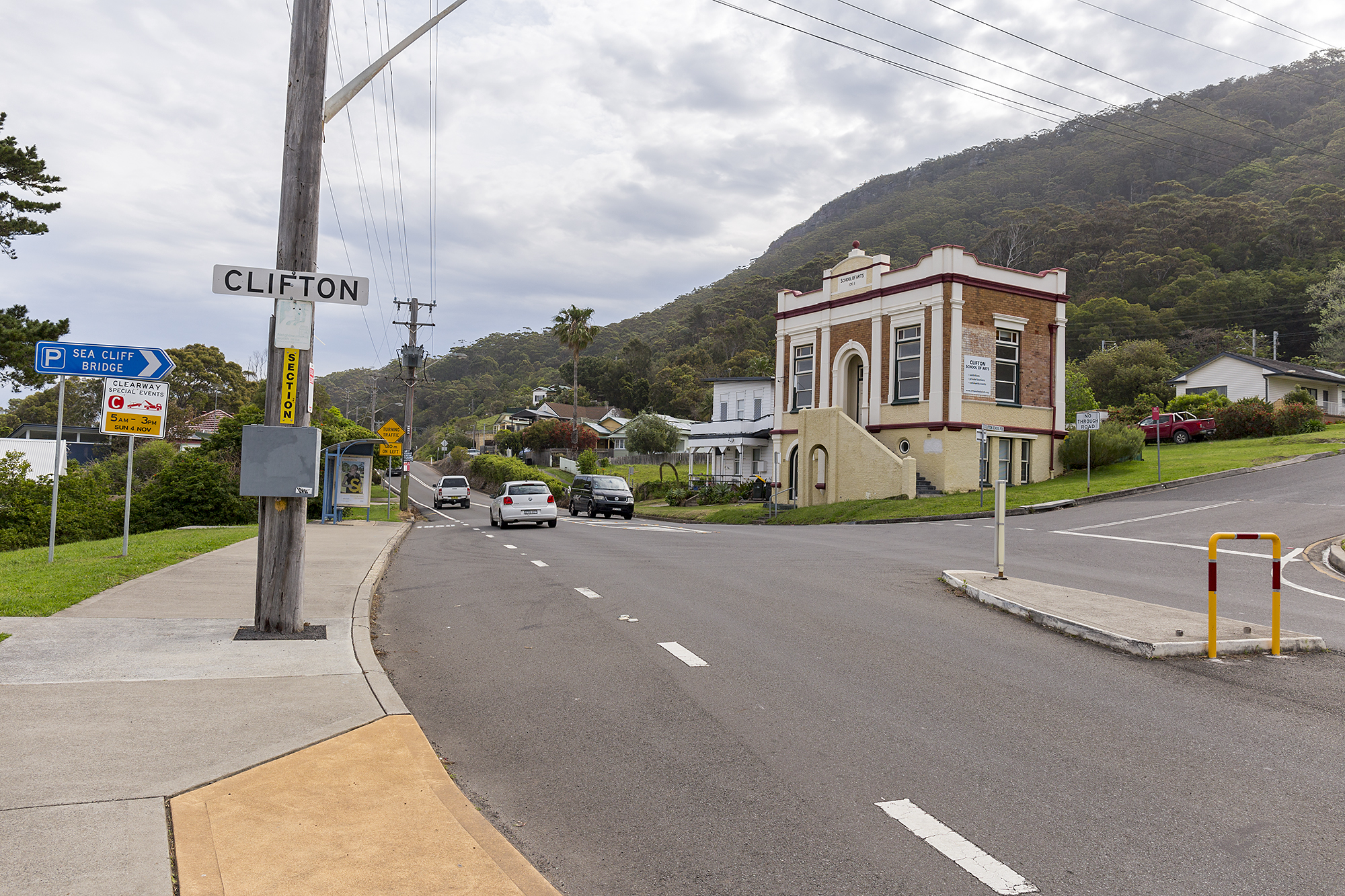
- View of Clifton from the Lawrence Hargrave Drive c. 2018

- Coordinates: 34°15′34″S 150°58′09″E
- Country: Australia
- State: New South Wales
- City: Wollongong
- LGA: City of Wollongong
- Location: 64 km (40 mi) S of Sydney; 22 km (14 mi) N of Wollongong

Government
  - State electorate: Heathcote
  - Federal division: Cunningham
- Elevation: 80 m (260 ft)

Population
  - Total: 35 (2021 census)
- Postcode: 2515
Suburbs around Clifton
Coalcliff
Clifton
Scarborough

Clifton is a village on the coast of New South Wales, Australia, between Sydney and Wollongong. Along with nearby Coalcliff, the village began life as a coal-mining centre. It is situated on a narrow area between the sea and the Illawarra escarpment. The electrified South Coast railway line passes through, but the station at Clifton was closed in 1915. It reopened on 4 July 1934 and closed for the last time on 27 November 1983, at the time of double tracking and electrification.

The Sea Cliff Bridge, opened in 2005, restored the connection between Clifton and Coalcliff, broken by frequent rock falls onto this section of the Lawrence Hargrave Drive. The bridge lies parallel to the former "coal cliffs" and offers scenic views of the cliffs, the sea, and surrounding coastline.

== History ==
In 1797, survivors of the Sydney Cove discovered coal in the 'Coal Cliffs'. Clifton was created with the construction of the Coal Cliff Colliery in 1877. It was situated on the southern end of the Stanwell Park Estate owned by surveyor Sir Thomas Mitchell. A number of weatherboard cottages with galvanised iron roofs had been built. The mine officially opened in 1878. In 1880, the School of Arts was established. Thomas Hale, the first mine manager, constructed a 500-foot (150 m) jetty out to sea and a slide down the 120-foot (37 m) cliff. This took coal to Hilda and Herga, two steam colliers built in Glasgow. Hilda struck a reef near Port Hacking in 1893. In 1878 the mine employed 73 men. By 1884 there were 150 miners, and coal production was 51,500 tons annually. Most of the miners lived, with their families, in Clifton. There was a post/telegraph office, school, (opened 1879), and James Farraher's Clifton Inn and in 1884 the press reported near 1000 residents, a large proportion of which worked at the mines. In 1879 a mail service to Bulli was established.

The mine closed after storms destroyed the jetty and job losses crippled the village. In 1887 the railway line had reached Clifton from Wollongong. Before this time four-horse coaches would travel between Wollongong and Clifton, starting from Wollongong at 5 am. In 1884 an Anglican and a Roman Catholic Church were built. A public hall was built in 1885. In 1887 the railway between Wollongong and Clifton was opened. In 1890 the Coal Cliff Coal and Land Company Ltd took over the colliery. In 1893 the Clifton School was opened. In 1910 the miners at the Coal Cliff Colliery went on strike for ten months. Also in 1910 the school of arts building was built. The strikers supplied some of the required labour for this project. In 1919 additions were made to the Catholic Church and it was blessed in a ceremony on the first of March.

From 8 to 10 May 1972, about sixty miners took over the mine at South Clifton in protest of its closure on May 5, ensuring the mine was reopened for a further period; all workers were returned to the payroll and promised work at other mines after the closure.

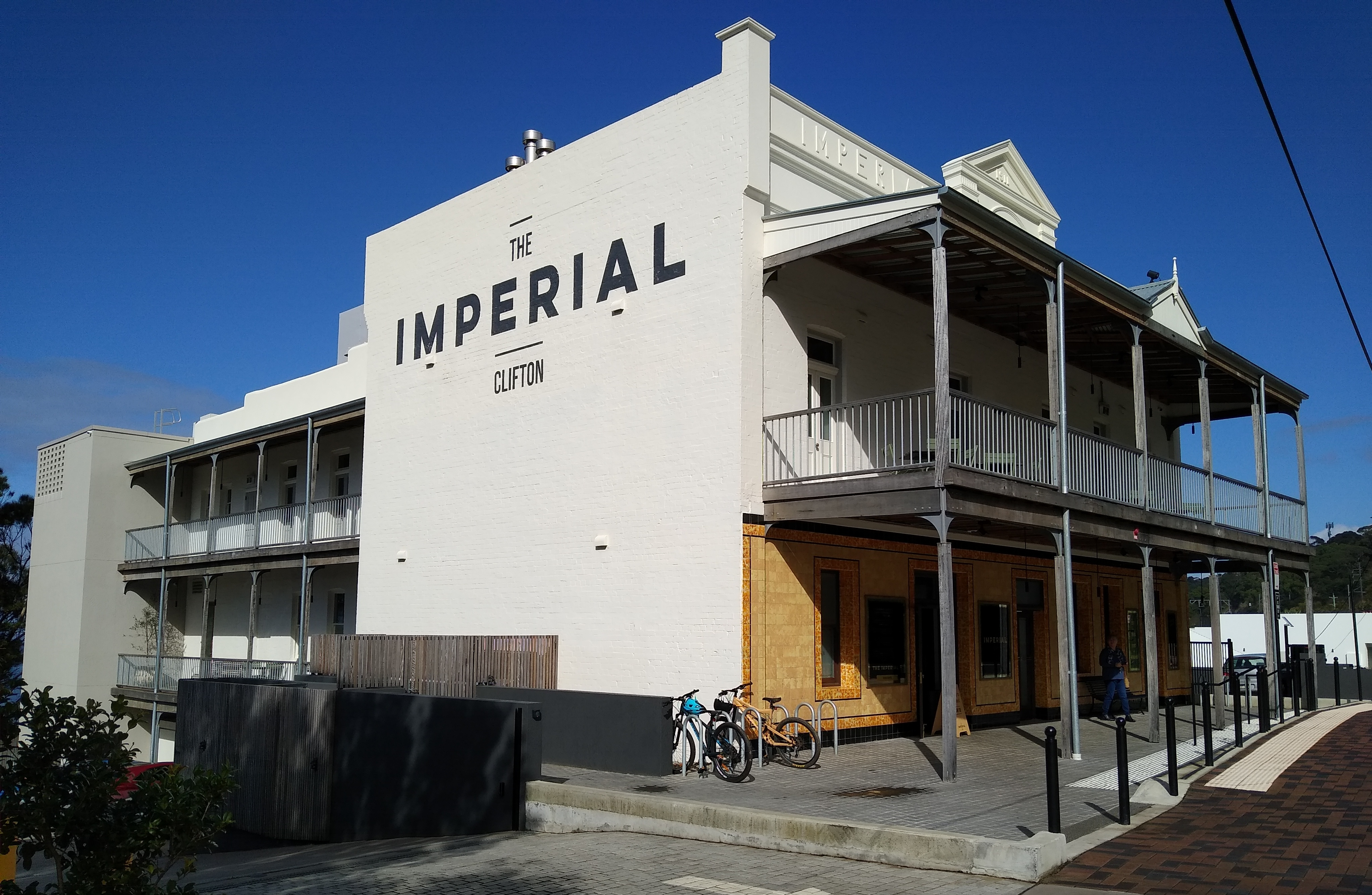
The Imperial Hotel in 2022

The Imperial Hotel was established 1884 by Allan Broadhead as a miners Pub. It closed in November 2002 after the collapse of Lawrence Hargrave Drive (now replaced by the Sea Cliff Bridge). It has now been purchased and restored by Shellharbour Workers Club.
