= Illawarra Coke Company =

Coke making facilities in Coalcliff and Corrimal, New South Wales, Australia

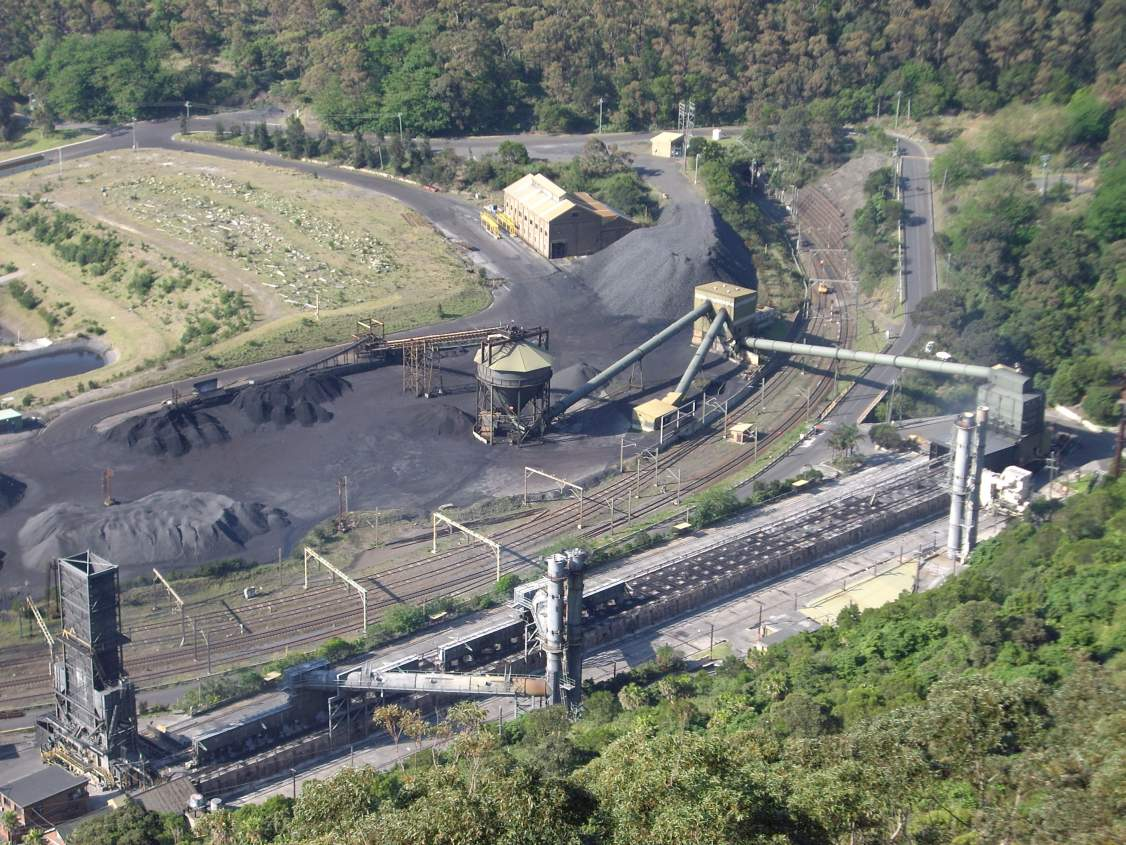
The Coalcliff facilities as seen from the top of the Illawarra escarpment

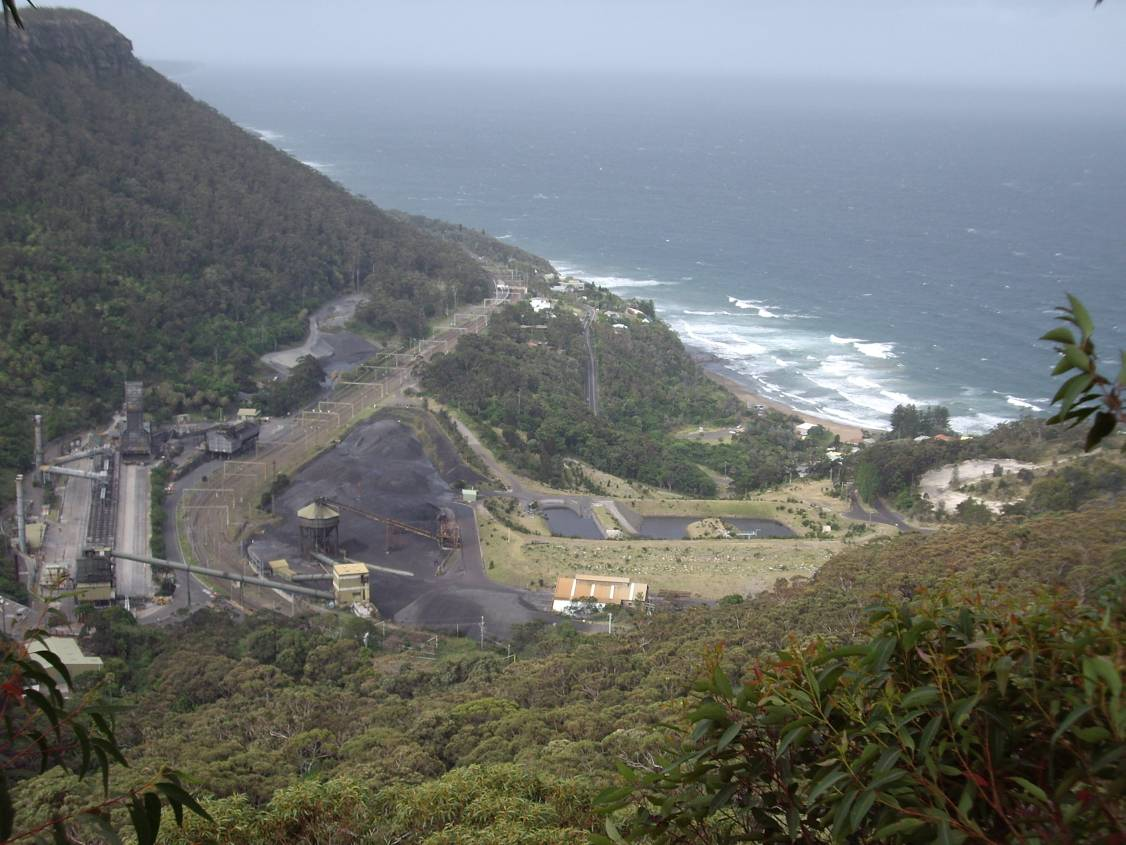
Coalcliff village with the Tasman Sea and the beach as seen from the south

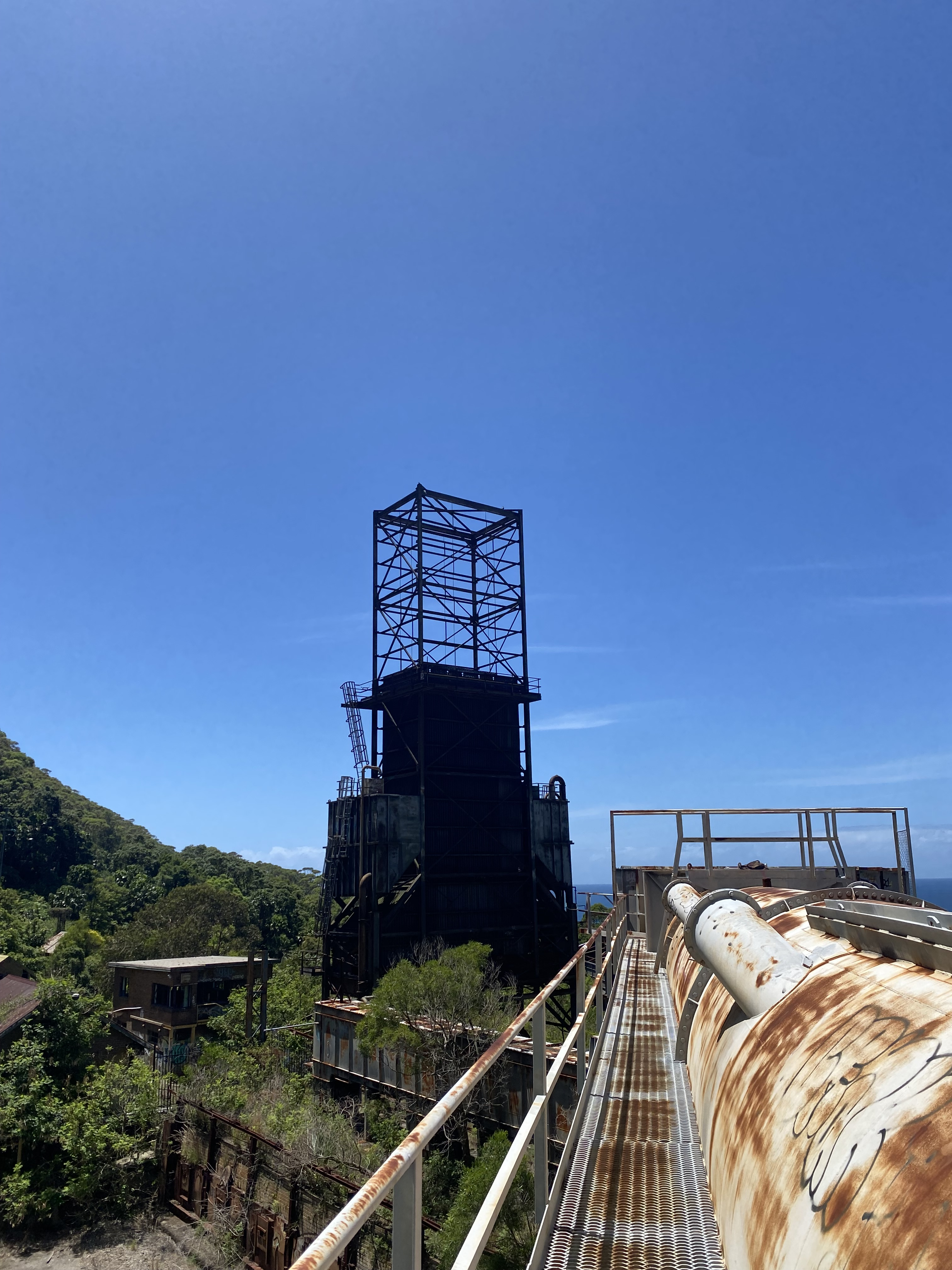
The cooling stack at the Coalcliff facilities as seen after the closure of the site by an urban explorer

The Illawarra Coke Company (ICC) owned and operated cokeworks located in Coalcliff and Corrimal, in the Illawarra region of New South Wales, Australia, where historically coal was mined on the slopes of the Illawarra escarpment. After the mines were closed, coke-making still occurred on these sites until their respective closures. The company was the only independent producer of metallurgical and foundry coke in Australia. The ICC purchased the Coalcliff and Corrimal sites from Kembla Coal & Coke in 1996. It produced coke for metallurgical processing and foundry to Australian and overseas base metals producers for lead and zinc smelting and iron production for steelmaking.

== History ==
Coal deposits in the Illawarra, specifically around Coalcliff and Austinmer, were reported in 1797 by British explorer George Bass. While there was initial difficulty setting up facilities on the side of the Illawarra escarpment, coal mining and processing facilities were soon established. At these sites, discarded coal was burnt to create coke, a process that began in the 1850s and spread to other nearby collieries. Ovens were first installed at the Corrimal cokeworks in 1911, and began operation the following year. Since the 1960s, ownership of both sites has passed between several companies, with the most recent purchase occurring in 1996, where the facilities fell under the ownership of the Illawarra Coke Company.

== Facilities ==
The Illawarra Coke Company operated two facilities, located in Coalcliff and Corrimal. The cokeworks in Coalcliff are located adjacent to the coastal town of the same name, 47 kilometres (29 mi) south of the Sydney central business district and 22 kilometres (14 mi) north of Wollongong. The site of the cokeworks and adjacent coal mine is intersected by the South Coast railway line. The Corrimal site is located 80 kilometres (50 mi) south of the Sydney CBD and 7.5 kilometres (4.7 mi) north of Wollongong. The Corrimal cokeworks were the first to begin production of coke, which began in 1912. Coke making at the Coalcliff facilities commenced in 1914.

== Closure ==
The Coalcliff facilities closed in 2013 after 99 years of operation. The adjacent cokeworks in Corrimal closed in April 2014. By the time it closed, the Illawarra Coke Company was the oldest continuous producer of coke in the world. Both the Coalcliff and Corrimal sites were not immediately demolished after closure, with the Corrimal site being demolished in 2024 for a housing project, and the Coalcliff site remaining intact as of 2026. Both became popular among urban explorers after their closure.
