= Lawrence Hargrave =

Australian engineer and inventor (1850–1915)

Lawrence Hargrave MRAeS
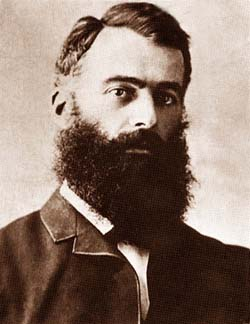
- Lawrence Hargrave, c. 1890
- Born: 29 January 1850; Greenwich, England
- Died: 6 July 1915 (aged 65)

Lawrence Hargrave, MRAeS, (29 January 1850 – 6 July 1915) (Note: Some sources erroneously state that he died on 14 July 1915. However, his death on 6 July was reported in the Melbourne Argus the following day.) was an Australian engineer, explorer, astronomer, inventor and aeronautical pioneer. He was perhaps best known for inventing the box kite, which was quickly adopted by other aircraft designers and subsequently formed the aerodynamic basis of early biplanes.

== Biography ==
Lawrence Hargrave was born in Greenwich, England, the second son of John Fletcher Hargrave (later Attorney-General of NSW), and was educated at Queen Elizabeth's Grammar School, Kirkby Lonsdale, Westmorland, where there is now a Design and Technology building named in his honour. He immigrated to Australia at fifteen years of age with his family, arriving in Sydney on 5 November 1865 on the La Hogue. He failed the matriculation examination and in 1867 took an engineering apprenticeship with the Australasian Steam Navigation Company in Sydney.

In 1877 he was inspecting the newly developing pearling industry for Parbury Lamb and Co.

Hargrave was a Freemason.

== Aeronautics ==
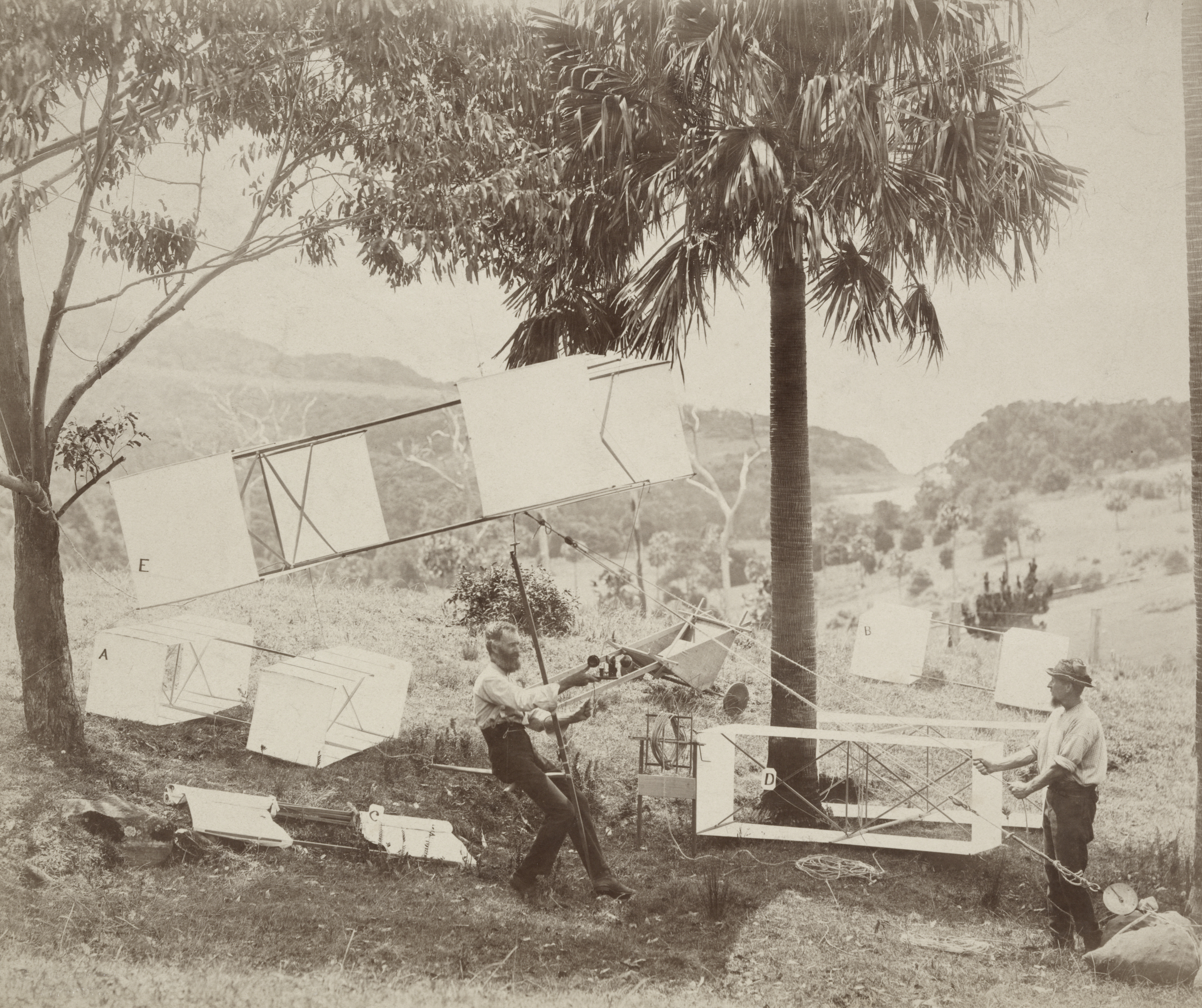
Hargrave (seated) and Swain demonstrate the manlift kites (labelled A, B, D, & E), sling seat and spring balance in the parkland behind Stanwell Park beach, November 1894

Hargrave had been interested in experiments of all kinds from an early age, particularly those with aircraft. When his father died in 1885, and Hargrave came into his inheritance, he resigned from the observatory to concentrate on full-time research. He chose to live and experiment with his flying machines in Stanwell Park, a place which offers excellent wind and hang conditions and nowadays is the most famous hang gliding and paragliding venue in Australia.

In his career, Hargrave invented many devices, but never applied for a patent on any of them. He needed the money but he was a passionate believer in scientific communication as a key to furthering progress. As he wrote in 1893:

Workers must root out the idea [that] by keeping the results of their labours to themselves[,] a fortune will be assured to them. Patent fees are much wasted money. The flying machine of the future will not be born fully fledged and capable of a flight for 1000 miles or so. Like everything else it must be evolved gradually. The first difficulty is to get a thing that will fly at all. When this is made, a full description should be published as an aid to others. Excellence of design and workmanship will always defy competition.

Among many, three of Hargrave's inventions were particularly significant:

- study of curved aerofoils, particularly designs with a thicker leading edge;
- the box kite (1893), which greatly improved the lift to drag ratio of early gliders;
- work on the rotary engine, which powered many early flying machines up until about 1920.

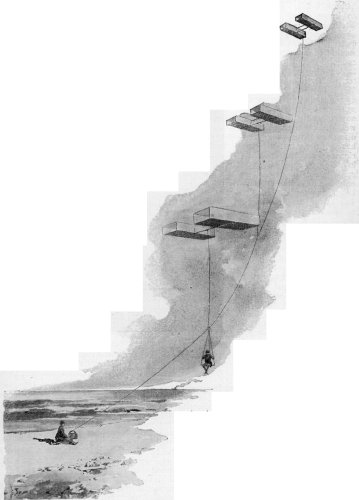
Hargrave lifted sixteen feet from the ground by a tandem of his box kites.

Of great significance to those pioneers working toward powered flight, Hargrave successfully lifted himself off the ground under a train of four of his box kites at Stanwell Park Beach on 12 November 1894. Aided by James Swain, the caretaker at his property, the kite line was moored via a spring balance to two sandbags (see image). Hargrave carried an anemometer and clinometer aloft to measure wind speed and the angle of the kite line. He rose 16 feet in a wind speed of 21 mph. This experiment was widely reported and established the box kite as a stable aerial platform. Hargrave claimed that "The particular steps gained are the demonstration that an extremely simple apparatus can be made, carried about, and flown by one man; and that a safe means of making an ascent with a flying machine, of trying the same without any risk of accident, and descending, is now at the service of any experimenter who wishes to use it".

His development of the rotary engine was frustrated by the weight of materials and quality of machining available at the time, and he was unable to get sufficient power from his engines to build an independent flying machine.

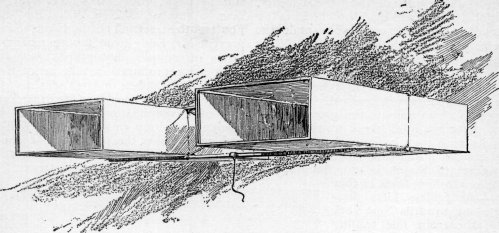
The Hargrave box-kite. It was by kites of this variety, flown in tandem, that the inventor, Hargrave, was lifted sixteen feet from the ground on 12 November 1894.

Hargrave's work inspired Alexander Graham Bell to begin his own experiments with a series of tetrahedral kite designs.

Hargrave's only son Geoffrey was killed at the Battle of Gallipoli in May 1915 during World War I. Hargrave was operated on for appendicitis but suffered peritonitis afterwards and died in July 1915. He was interred in Waverley Cemetery on the cliffs overlooking the open ocean.

== Honors and memorials ==
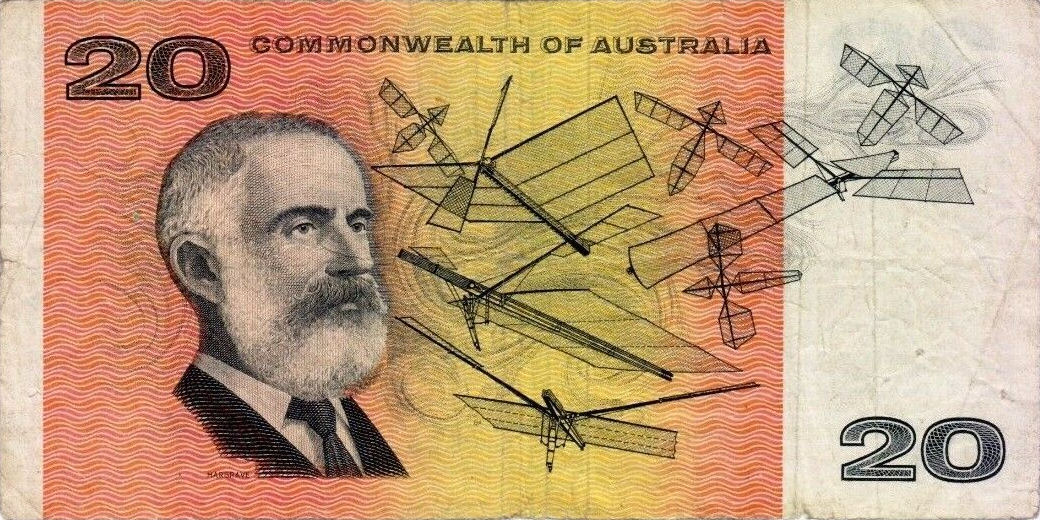
From 1966 to 1994 the Australian 20 dollar note featured Hargrave on the reverse.

- An engraving of Lawrence Hargrave alongside some of his gliders appeared on the reverse of the Australian $20 banknote from 1966 to 1994.
- Hargrave has been the subject of two operas. The first was Barry Conyngham's opera Fly which premiered in 1984 at the Victoria State Opera. The second was by Nigel Butterley with libretto by James McDonald, titled Lawrence Hargrave Flying Alone, which premiered at the Sydney Conservatorium of Music in 1988.
- There is a memorial stone cairn with dedication plaque at Bald Hill, overlooking the successful man lift site.
- Lawrence Hargrave Drive is a road which stretches from the Old Princes Highway in Helensburgh to the bottom of Bulli Pass in Thirroul.
- Lawrence Hargrave Reserve in Elizabeth Bay Road, Elizabeth Bay was named to commemorate Hargrave who lived nearby at 40 Roslyn Gardens from 1885 to 1893.
- A centenary celebration and re-enactment was held in November 1994 to commemorate the man lift at Stanwell Park beach.
- The Lawrence Hargrave Professor of Aeronautical Engineering at Sydney University and the Hargrave-Andrew Engineering and Sciences library at Monash University are named in his honour.
- Australia's largest airline Qantas named its fifth Airbus A380 aircraft (registration VH-OQE) after Lawrence Hargrave.
- A new technology building at his former school in Kirkby Lonsdale, England was named in his honour in 2017.
- A 1988 Lawrence Hargrave memorial sculpture, Winged Figure by Bert Flugelman, is located at the base of Mount Keira.
- A memorial plaque on Lawrence Hargrave's residence in Point Piper, Sydney Google Streetview Lawrence Hargrave memorial plaque

== See also ==
- Man-lifting kite
