= Coalcliff =

- Suburb
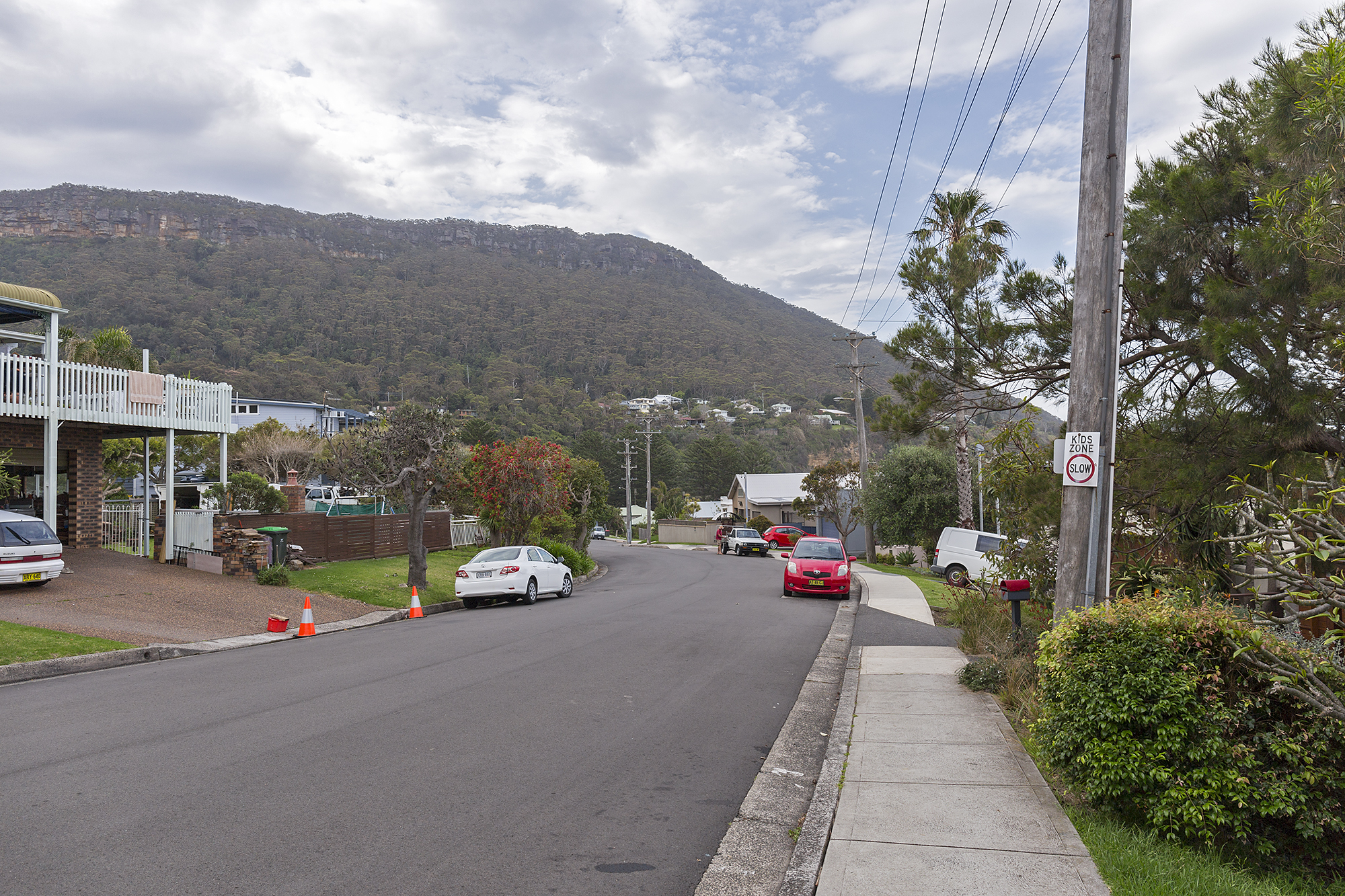
- Paterson Road in Coalcliff

- Coordinates: 34°14′38″S 150°58′25″E
- Country: Australia
- State: New South Wales
- City: Wollongong
- LGA: City of Wollongong
- Location: 62 km (39 mi) S of Sydney; 23 km (14 mi) N of Wollongong

Government
  - State electorate: Heathcote
  - Federal division: Cunningham
- Elevation: 75 m (246 ft)

Population
  - Total: 212 (2021 census)
- Postcode: 2508
Suburbs around Coalcliff
Stanwell Park
Coalcliff
Clifton

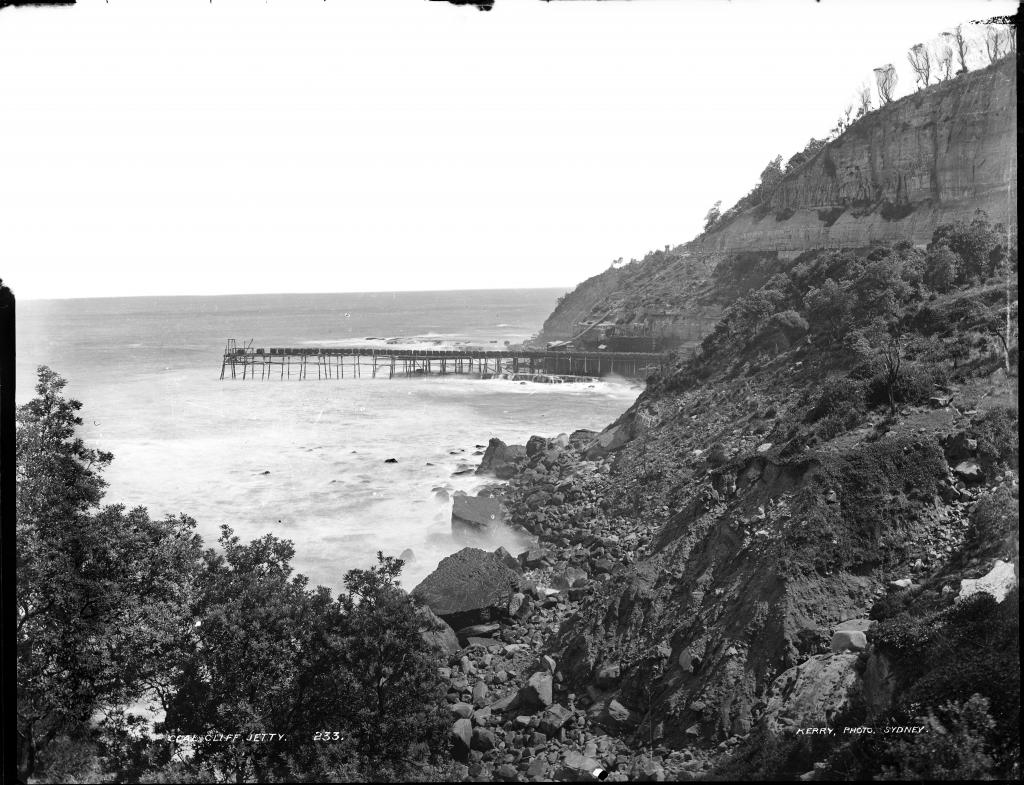
Coalcliff Jetty 1885

Coalcliff is a town on the coast of New South Wales, Australia, between Sydney and Wollongong.

== History ==
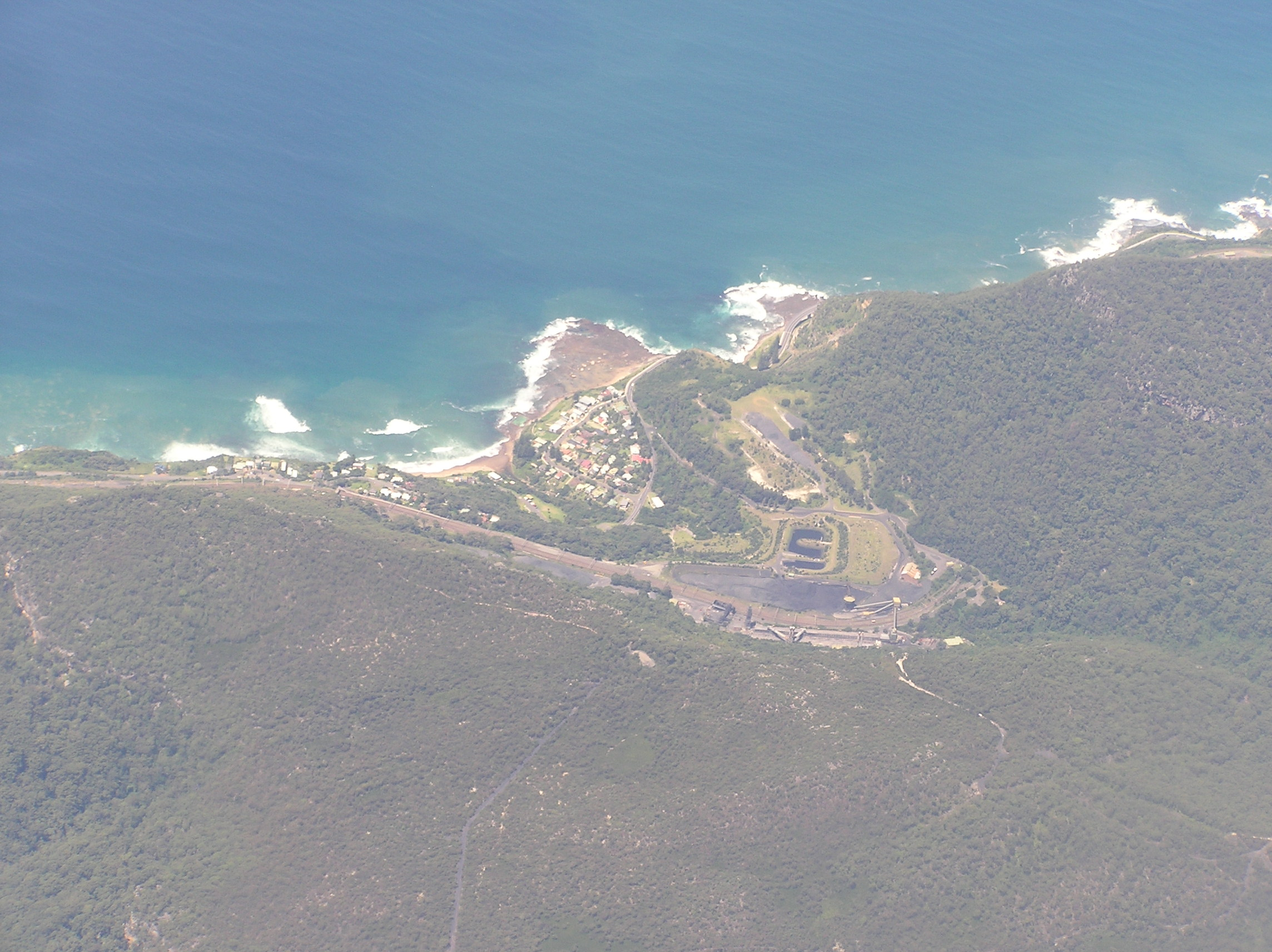
Aerial photo from north west

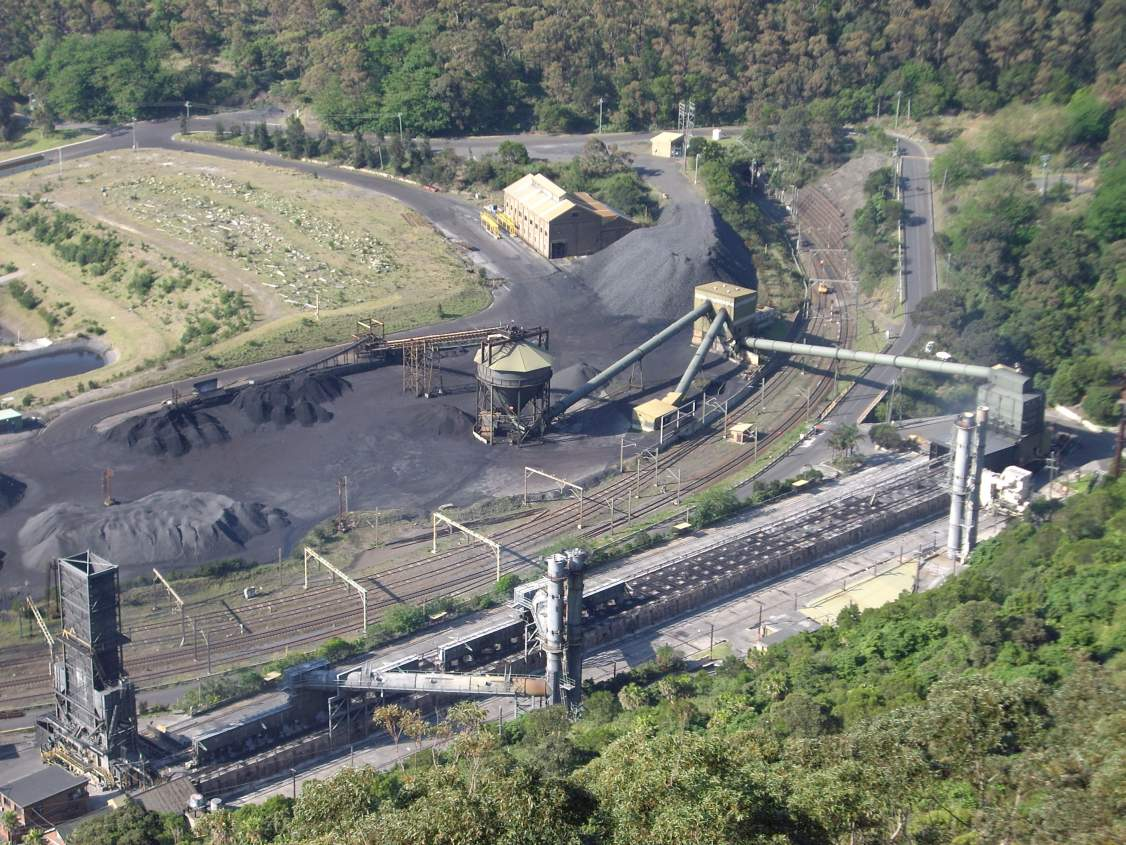
The Illawarra Coke Company (ICC) in Coalcliff. The electrified South Coast railway line passes through its site.

In 1796 William Clark and others trekking north to Port Jackson from the wrecked ship Sydney Cove noticed coal exposed at the cliffs there and made a fire from it, attracting rescuers, giving the area its name. George Bass was despatched to report on it and traced the deposit along the shore and inland. There was nowhere for ships to safely land though, so it was not until 1850 that it began to be excavated.

=== Coal mine and jetty ===
The Coalcliff Colliery, opened in 1878, was originally developed as a jetty mine. The mine entrance was an adit driven into six-foot thick coal seam that was exposed in face of the sea-cliff, less than forty feet above sea level. Coal from the mine, after screening, was brought directly onto the jetty. This arrangement made working the mine difficult, as there was limited storage for mined coal and only coal that could be shipped promptly could be mined.

Storms in 1878, 1881 and 1904 caused considerable damage to the jetty, further restricting shipping operations while damage was repaired and the jetty design modified.

The jetty at Coalcliff was the smallest of the ocean jetties of the southern coalfield. It was very exposed to ocean swell, and shifting sand shoals added to the danger by changing the depth of water near the jetty. The jetty was used only by the colliery's own 'sixty-milers' and then only in favourable weather. Those ships were designed to have a shallow draft and self-trimming hatches, to minimise the chance of touching bottom during loading and to allow quick departures to be made. Difficulties with loading exacerbated the problems of operating the jetty mine and limited the amount of coal that could be sold.

After the South Coast railway line opened in 1888, there was increased competition from mines that delivered coal by rail or used the railway to access more reliable and larger ports such as Port Kembla, Bulli or Bellambi. The jetty mine operation became financially precarious and operated only intermittently. In 1910, a shaft was opened that allowed coal from the mine to be transported by rail. After 1910, very little coal was loaded at the jetty and the jetty closed by 1912.

The Coalcliff Mine went on to become one of the largest underground and longest-lived mines. It remained in production for 114 years. Around the time that it closed in 1992, the mined coal emerging at Coalcliff was coming underground from as far away as near Darkes Forest.

=== Commercial outlets ===
In 1888 the Coalcliff General Store opened at 28 Paterson Road (once referred to as the 'main street') by Mr John Earle Gibbons and his wife, son and daughter-in-law of Matthew John Gibbons who arrived in Australia in 1790 as a convict on the Second Fleet, and was one of Coalcliff's earliest residents. Architecturally the store was of plain colonial style, constructed of local wood with a sandstone foundation. It sold, amongst other household items, milk, bread, butter, drinks, meat, stationery, cigarettes and other tobacco paraphernalia, jams, preserves, poultry and bakery products. The shop was the major lifeforce behind the township until closure in 1907. The same year the shop was burned to the ground via unknown causes and remained a vacant lot until 1910 when another store was erected and opened by a Mr. L. Jameson. This is the building that still stands today at the corner on Paterson Road, which has been a private residential property since 1961.

The Jameson Store was the last running commercial outlet in Coalcliff, which ceased operation in May 1960 due to excessive running costs and a severe lack of customers, with many of the towns-people opting to shop at nearby Stanwell Park, Helensburgh or south to Bulli and Wollongong. At the height of its popularity it served as a milkbar, fish and chip shop, general store, tobacconist and bottle shop. Its unsurpassable views meant it was a popular place for holidayers passing by.

The only evidence of this once thriving store are the fading advertisements painted to its side and roof.

== Attractions ==
The Sea Cliff Bridge was opened on 11 December 2005 and offers a walkway and cycleway above the ocean and along the escarpment. There are views towards Wollongong and Port Kembla in the south and Bald Hill and the Royal National Park in the north.

This also forms part of The Grand Pacific Walk, which is currently being constructed through Coalcliff.

The Wodi Wodi Track can be accessed on Lawrence Hargrave Drive at the northern end of Coalcliff.

Coalcliff also has a beach with an ocean pool. Access to the pool from Lawrence Hargrave Drive is through Leeder Park, named after Noel Leeder who was a Manager at the Coalcliff Cokeworks in the 1960s and ensured the park be established.

There are public toilets and showers in Leeder Park and at the surf club.

== Activities ==
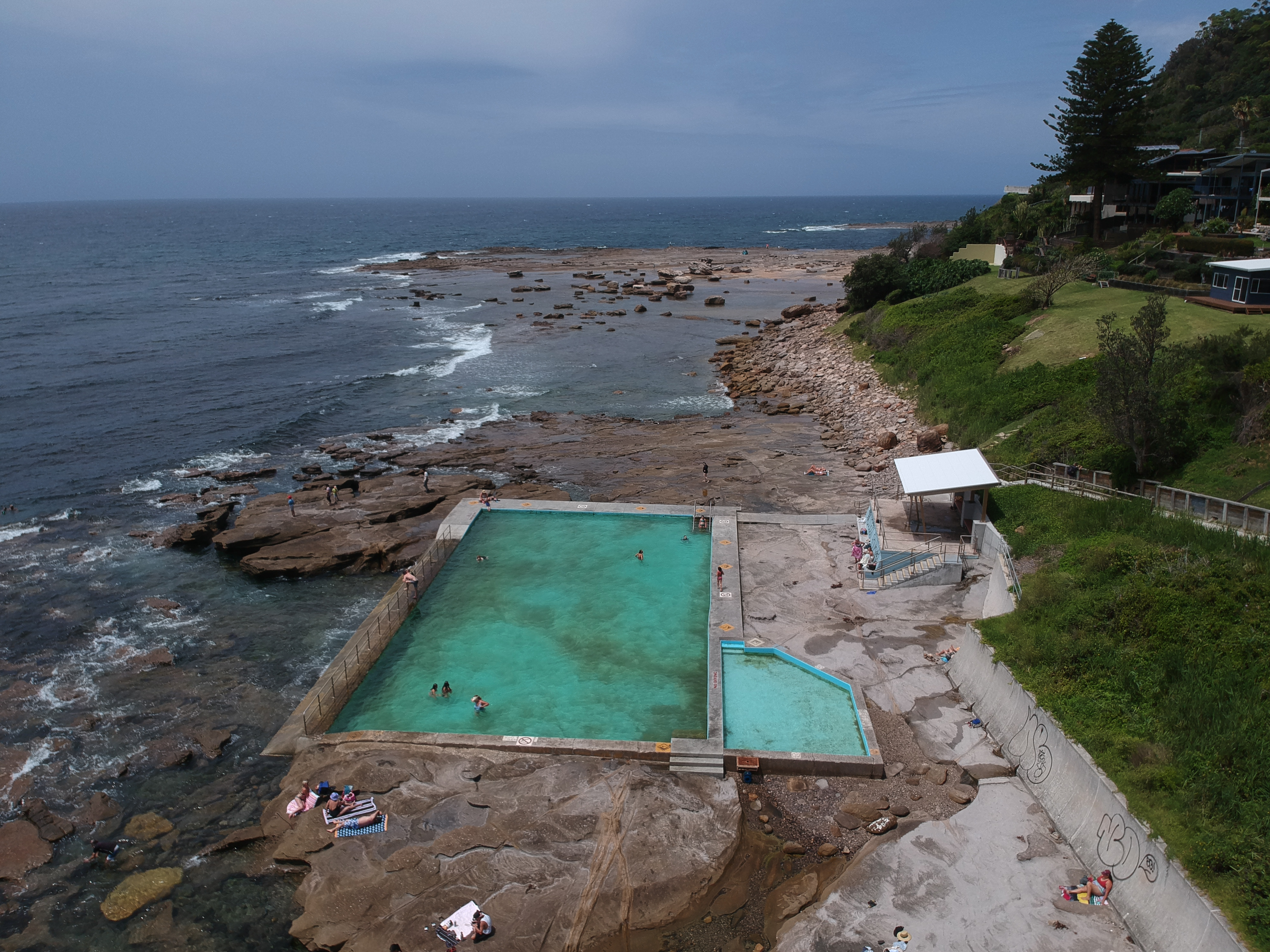
Coalcliff Rock Pool

Coalcliff hosts its own Surf Life Saving Club with events like Nippers in summertime and assuring beach safety. The Sea Eels winter swimming club takes place in the ocean pool and is co-organised with the Helensburgh-Stanwell Park Surf Life Saving Club such as the yearly 2.4 km Ocean Challenge swim between the two clubs in early April.

== Industry ==
The Illawarra Coke Company (ICC) coke works here and at Corrimal produced approximately 250,000 tonnes of coke per annum using non-recovery technology.

The ICC business closed in 2014.

== See also ==
- Coastal coal-carrying trade of New South Wales
