= Lithic sandstone =

Sandstone with fragments of other rocks

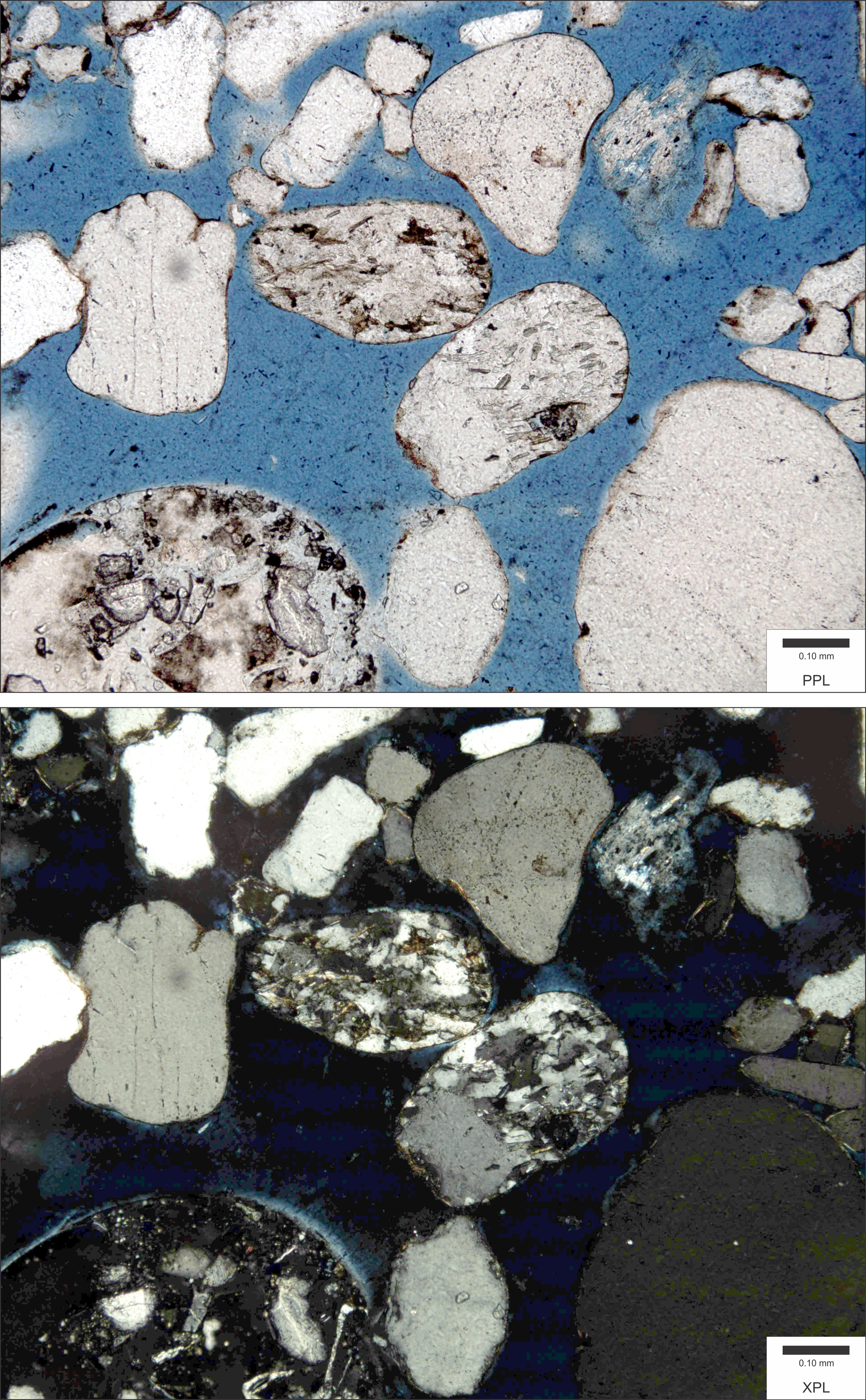
Photomicrograph of a lithic arenite (sandstone) from the Wolfville Formation (Jurassic). Top image is in plane polarized light (PPL); bottom image is in cross polarized light (XPL). Blue epoxy fills pore spaces.

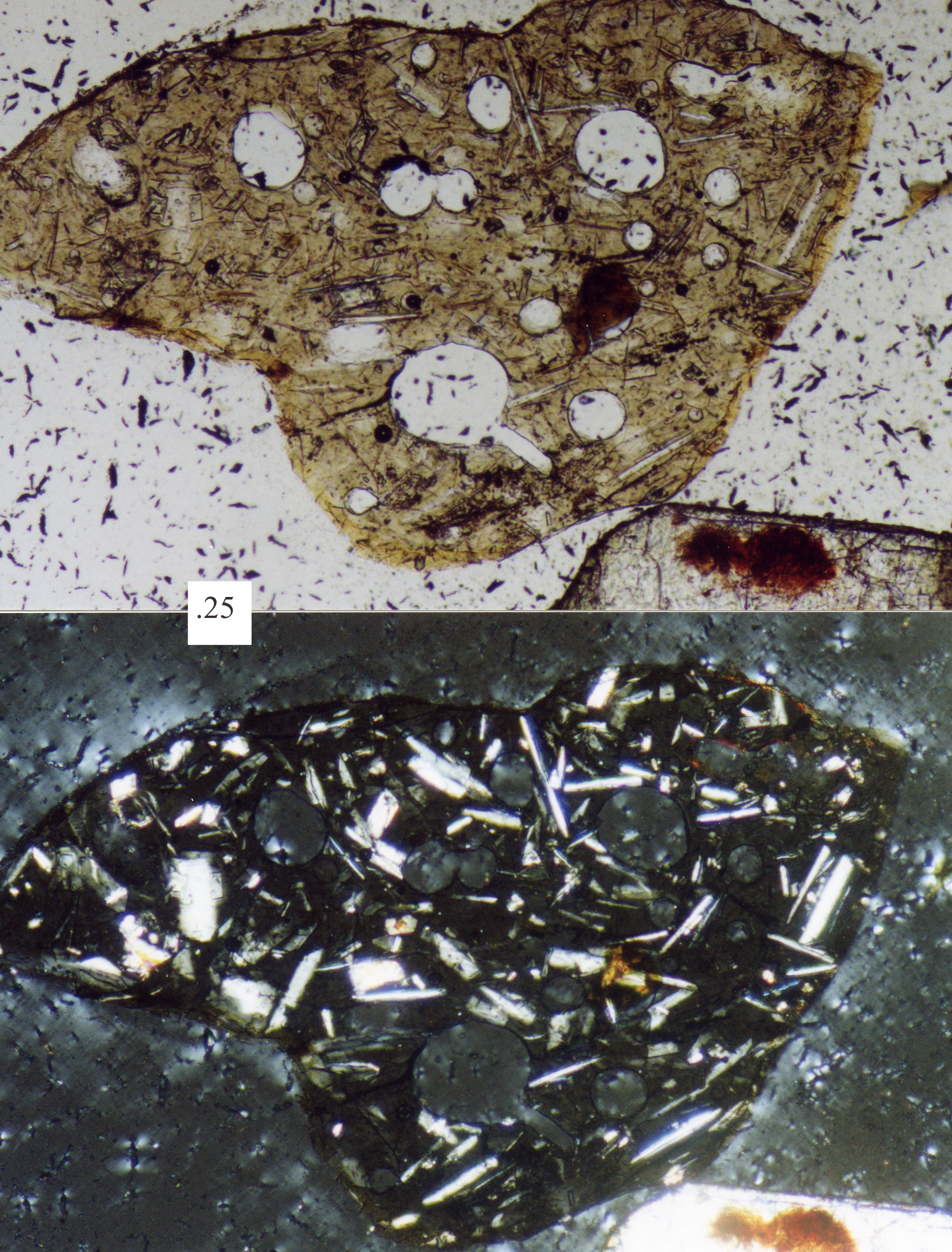
Photomicrograph of a volcanic sand grain; upper picture is plane-polarized light, bottom picture is cross-polarized light, scale box at left-center is 0.25 millimeter. This type of grain is a main component of a lithic sandstone.

Lithic sandstones, or lithic arenites, or litharenites, are sandstones with a significant (>5%) component of lithic fragments, though quartz and feldspar are usually present as well, along with some clayey matrix. Lithic sandstones can have a speckled (salt and pepper) or gray color, and are usually associated with one specific type of lithic fragment (i.e., igneous, sedimentary, or metamorphic).

Tectonically, lithic sandstones often form in a wide variety sedimentary depositional environments (including fluvial, deltaic, and alluvial sediments) associated with active margins. This tectonic setting provides the source of the lithic fragments, either through arc volcanism, thin-skinned faulting, continental collisions, unroofing, and subduction roll-back.

== See also ==
- Arkose
- Quartz arenite
