= Yarrawarrah =

- Suburb
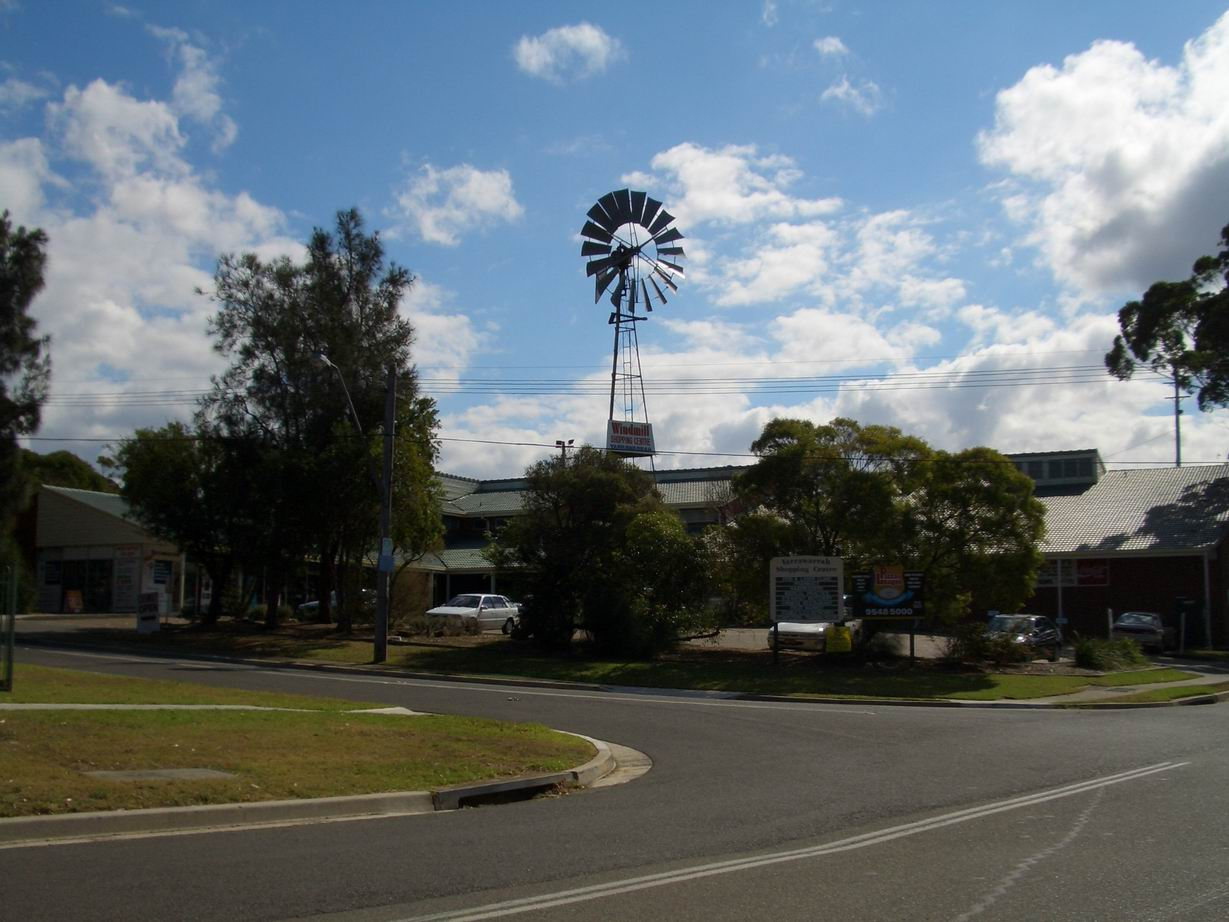
- Yarrawarrah Shopping Village, Old Bush Road

- Interactive map of Yarrawarrah
- Coordinates: 34°03′19″S 151°01′56″E
- Country: Australia
- State: New South Wales
- City: Sydney
- LGA: Sutherland Shire
- Location: 32 km (20 mi) south of Sydney CBD; 51 km (32 mi) north of Wollongong
- Established: 1971

Government
  - State electorate: Heathcote
  - Federal division: Hughes
- Elevation: 166 m (545 ft)

Population
  - Total: 2,775 (2021 census)
- Postcode: 2233
Suburbs around Yarrawarrah
North Engadine	Loftus	Loftus
Engadine	Yarrawarrah
Engadine		Royal National Park

Yarrawarrah is a suburb in southern Sydney, in the state of New South Wales, Australia 32 kilometres south of the Sydney central business district, in the local government area of the Sutherland Shire.

The traditional inhabitants of Yarrawarrah are the Tharawal people, with Yarrawarrah being an Aboriginal word meaning mountain ash. Yarrawarrah is also the name of a ridge which was located in the vicinity between Heathcote and Waterfall.

== History ==
A history of the Yarrawarra suburb is available at the Dictionary of Sydney Yarrawarra page, contributed by a Sutherland Shire Library local studies librarian, a summary of which follows. Prior to Yarrawarrah being recognised as a suburb by Geographical Names Board in 1971, the area was known as North Engadine. Charles McAlister, a pioneering developer of the Engadine area took up the first portions of crown land in 1887, likely offered for sale due to the opening of the Illawarra railway line to Waterfall earlier in 1886. The initial residents of the area in the 1920s consisted of the returning soldiers and their families after World War I and then later families moving from inner Sydney suburbs during the Depression. In the 1930s, families were relocated to the area from existing unemployment camps in Cook Park at Botany Bay.

Through 1939, industrialisation increased in the area with a clay and shale pit at the end of what is now Old Bush Road, although of limited impact other than to increase the visibility of the need of improved access. In 1952, bush fires caused significant damage further highlighting the limited access, and helped establish a new progress association in 1959 in front of the general store located on Old Bush Road. In 1962, the State Housing Commission announced it was planning a new suburb on 80 acres (32.3 hectares) of crown land between Loftus and Engadine and adjacent to the north Engadine settlement.

In 1968, the primary school was built on Old Bush Road, with a proposed name of Engadine North, however, this was rejected by the Geographical Names Board, instead settling on Yarrawarrah (being an Aboriginal word for mountain ash and a nearby ridgeline). Thus, the proposal of the new suburb being seen by some as potentially absorbing Engadine North, and a counter concern that Engadine itself could encompass the entire region to Old Bush Road, in 1971 led to the Geographical Names Board officially designated the area Yarrawarrah.

In the 1970s, changes to the way the Princes Highway was routed allowed further road access to the area which were completed in 1975. A final request for a Railway station was rejected by council in 1979. In 1983 Sutherland council allocated funds to build a new hall under the name of Yarrawarrah Community Hall. The North Engadine Scout Hall remained and is still adjacent to it. The new hall was opened in 1984. Through the 1990s the local community amenities continued to be developed with the local shopping village growing to provide for the growing demand of local residents.

== Population ==
At the 2021 census, there were 2,775 people in Yarrawarrah. 84.9% of people were born in Australia. The next most common country of birth was England at 3.5%. 92.1% of people only spoke English at home. The most common responses for religion were No Religion 33.6%, Catholic 27.8% and Anglican 19.8%.

== Locale ==
Yarrawarrah borders the Royal National Park and contains many pockets of bushland. It is a hilly suburb stretching to the valley of Engadine, with several fire trail heads (Turrella, Fairy Creek). Yarrawarrah contains many streets named after places in Western Australia and South Australia, including Nullabor Place, Gibson Street, Wittenoom Place, Roebourne Street, Carnarvon Street and Exmouth Place, along with Aboriginal themes (animals, plants) and War themes (Victoria's Cross recipients, notable local veterans).

== Local Amenities ==
Yarrawarrah has a small shopping village with a landmark windmill, containing a medical practice, pharmacy hair salon, Italian and Chinese restaurants, and a convenience store. The Yarrawarrah Community Hall is also across the road from the shopping village with a main hall (90 standing, 70 seated) and meeting room (15 standing, 10 seated) available for hire, with adjacent North Engadine Scout Hall.

Yarrawarrah also has a community run, hobby Internet connected weather station.

== Education ==
Yarrawarrah Public School was established in 1968 is located behind the shopping village on Old Bush Road.

== Sport ==
Yarrawarrah has two sporting ovals:

- Old Bush Road Oval on Old Bush Road (home to the Engadine Lions Rugby Union Club] and National Touch Rugby Australia games)
- Yarrawarrah Reserve on the corner of Giles Street and Wheatley Road (home to Yarrawarrah Tigers Junior Rugby League Football Club and Yarrawarrah Tigers Junior Baseball Club)

== Transport ==
The Princes Highway is the main road that borders Yarrawarrah, to the east. There were originally requests to build a wooden railway platform in 1936, but it was never built, with road access being improved, further requests to build a train station in Yarrawarrah were raised in the 1970s, however the plans never went ahead, being refused by council in 1979. The closest train stations are Engadine and Loftus. Buses also service the area, notably U-Go Mobility 991 and 993 routes.
