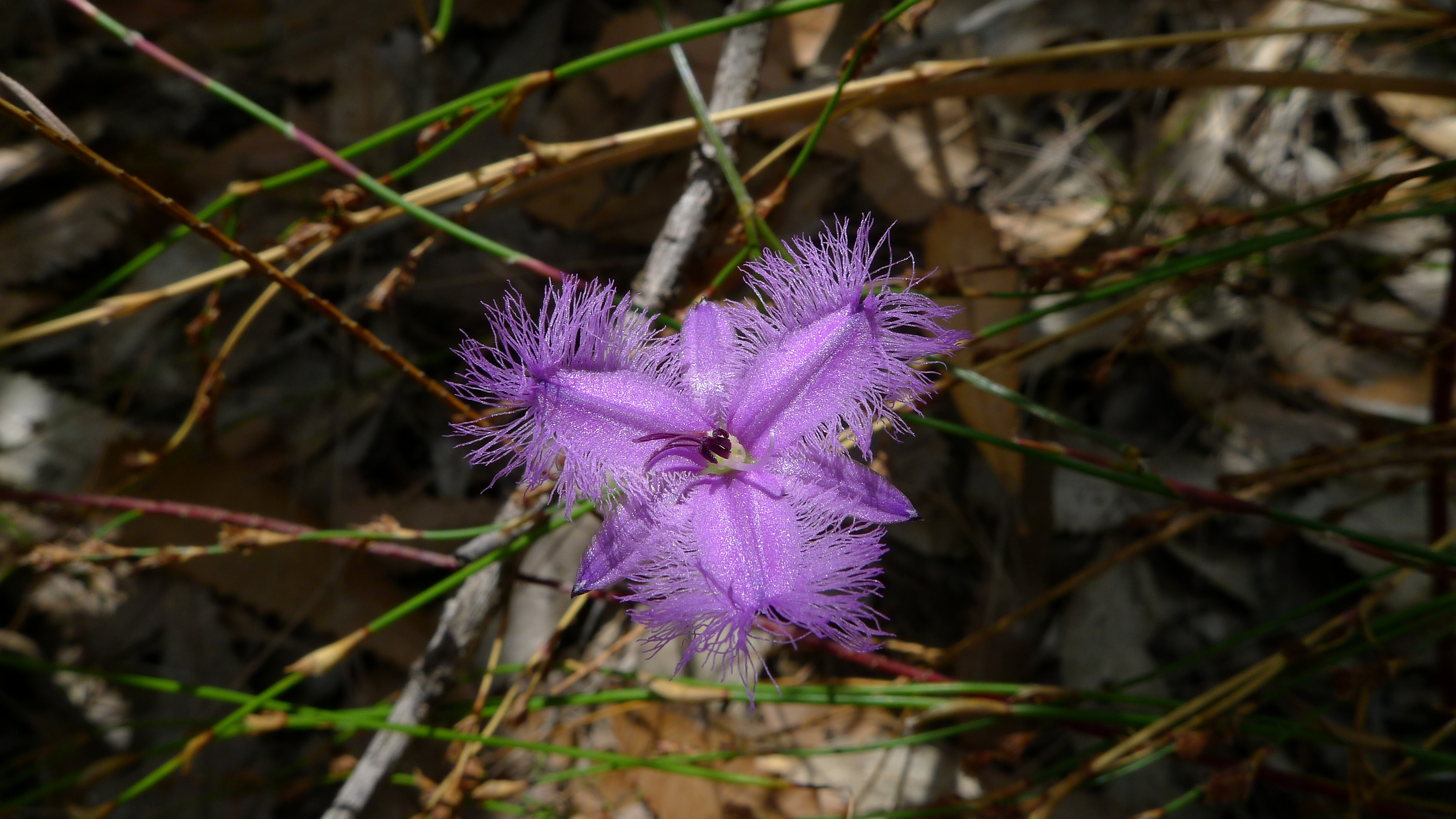
- In the Royal National Park near Loftus

Scientific classification
- Kingdom: Plantae
- Clade: Embryophytes
- Clade: Tracheophytes
- Clade: Spermatophytes
- Clade: Angiosperms
- Clade: Monocots
- Order: Asparagales
- Family: Asparagaceae
- Subfamily: Lomandroideae
- Genus: Thysanotus
- Species: T. virgatus

Binomial name
- Thysanotus virgatus Brittan

= Thysanotus virgatus =

Species of plant

Thysanotus virgatus is a species of flowering plant in the Asparagaceae family, and is endemic to New South Wales, Australia. It is a leafless herb with a small rhizome, fibrous roots and several flowering stems with umbels of two purple flowers with linear to elliptic sepals, elliptic, fringed petals and six stamens with anthers of different lengths.

== Description ==
Thysanotus virgatus is a leafless herb with a small rhizome about 30 mm (1.2 in) long and fibrous roots. The flowers are borne in umbels on the ends of branched stems 280–300 mm (11–12 in) long, with up to two flowers on each branch, each flower on a pedicel 6–8 mm (0.24–0.31 in) long. The perianth segments are 10–11 mm (0.39–0.43 in) long, the sepal linear to elliptic, 3–4 mm (0.12–0.16 in) long. The petals are purple, elliptic, 5–6 mm (0.20–0.24 in) wide with a fringe 4–5 mm (0.16–0.20 in) long. There are six stamens with twisted anthers, the outer 3 anthers about 3 mm (0.12 in) long, the inner ones 6 mm (0.24 in) long, and the style 5 mm (0.20 in) long. Flowering occurs from December and January, and the capsule is 3–4 mm (0.12–0.16 in) in diameter.

== Taxonomy ==
Thysanotus virgatus was first formally described in 1972 by Norman Henry Brittan in Contributions from the New South Wales National Herbarium, from specimens he collected near Bottle Forest Road in Heathcote. The specific epithet (virgatus) means 'having long, slender stems'.

== Distribution and habitat ==
This species of fringed lily grows in sandy soils in forest, or in heathy vegetation on poorly-drained sandstone plateau, from Sutherland and the Royal National Park to near Mount Keira.
