= Loftus railway station, Sydney =

Railway station in Sydney, New South Wales, Australia

Loftus
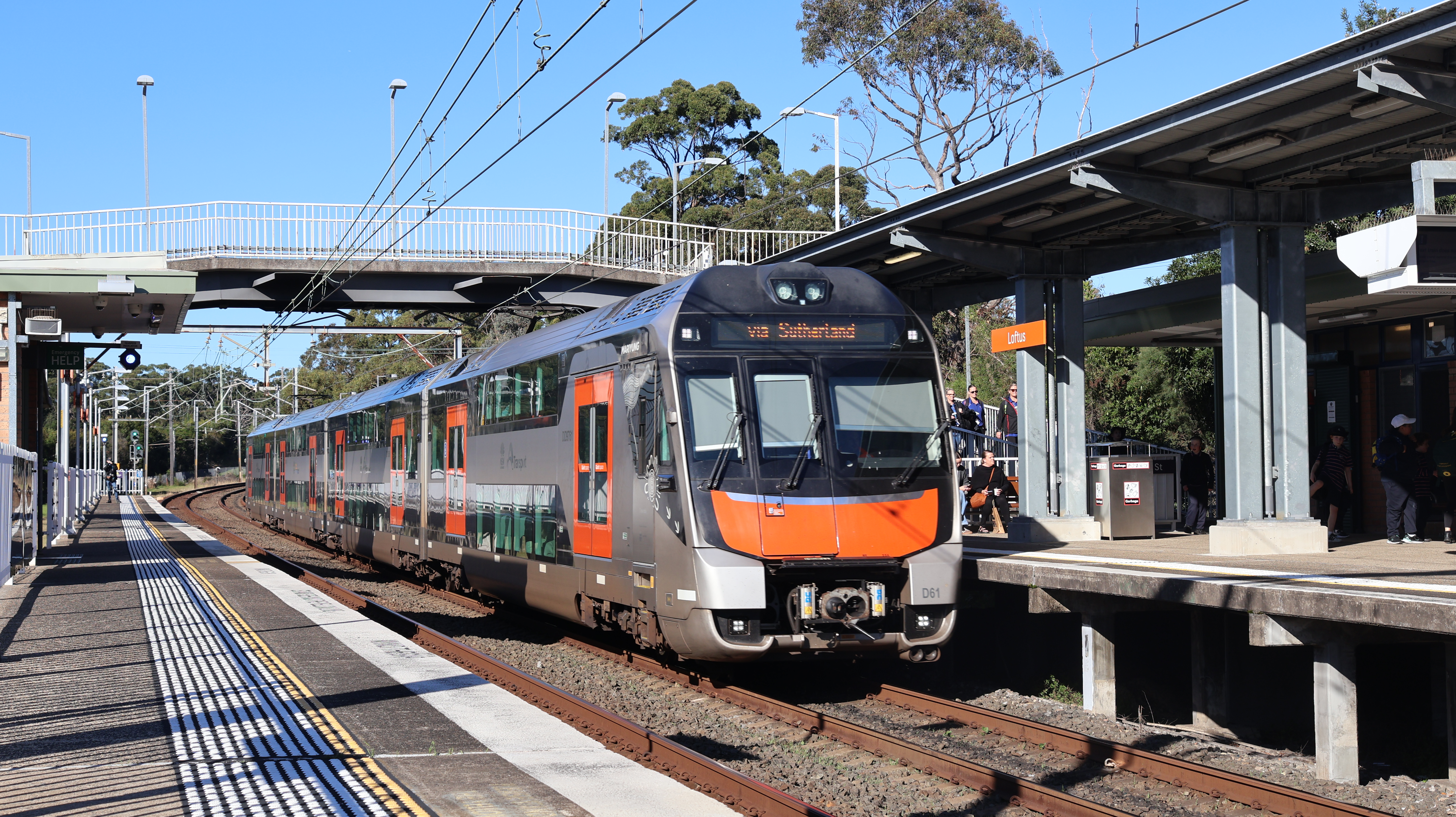
- Southbound view from Platform 2 in June 2026 of a Mariyung D Set passing platform 1 on an intercity service

General information
- Location: Loftus Avenue, Loftus; Sydney, New South Wales; Australia
- Coordinates: 34°02′42″S 151°03′05″E
- Elevation: 108 metres (354 ft)
- Owner: Transport Asset Manager of NSW
- Operator: Sydney Trains
- Line: South Coast
- Distance: 26.29 km (16.34 mi) from Central
- Platforms: 2 (2 side)
- Tracks: 2
- Connections: Bus

Construction
- Structure type: Ground
- Accessible: Assisted access

Other information
- Status: Weekdays: Staffed: 6am to 2pm: Weekends and public holidays: Staffed: 8am to 4pm
- Station code: LOF
- Website: Transport for NSW

History
- Opened: 9 March 1886 (140 years ago)
- Rebuilt: 1979 (47 years ago)
- Electrified: Yes (from November 1926)
- Former names: Loftus Junction (1886–1896)

Passengers
- 2025: 195,460 (year); 536 (daily) (Sydney Trains)
- Rank: 192

Services
Preceding station	Sydney Trains	Following station
Engadine towards Waterfall	Eastern Suburbs & Illawarra Line	Sutherland towards Bondi Junction
Preceding station	Intercity Trains	Following station
Engadine towards Kiama or Port Kembla	South Coast Line (peak hour services)	Sutherland towards Central or Bondi Junction
Location

Loftus railway station is a suburban railway station located on the South Coast line, serving the Sydney suburb of Loftus. It is served by Sydney Trains T4 Eastern Suburbs & Illawarra Line services and limited intercity South Coast Line services.

== History ==
Loftus station opened on 9 March 1886 as Loftus Junction when the Illawarra line was extended from Sutherland to Waterfall. In September 1896 it was renamed Loftus. It was rebuilt in 1979 as part of the extension of the electrification from Loftus Junction to Waterfall.

From 1886 until 1991, Loftus was the former junction of the branch line to Royal National Park, which branched off immediately south of the station.

The Sydney Tramway Museum is located adjacent to the station and operates historic trams to Royal National Park as well as a section alongside Rawson Avenue to a terminus at Sutherland, with a line totalling 4 kilometres (2.5 mi) in length.

== Services ==
=== Platforms ===
Platform	Line	Stopping pattern	Notes
1	T4	services to Bondi Junction	
1	SCO	services to Bondi Junction	limited weekday morning peak services
2	T4	services to Waterfall & Helensburgh	
2	SCO	services to Kiama; 1 weekday morning service to Port Kembla	limited weekday morning peak services

=== Transport links ===
U-Go Mobility operates two bus routes via Loftus station, under contract to Transport for NSW:

- 991: Sutherland station to Heathcote
- 993: Westfield Miranda to Woronora Heights

== See also ==
- Loftus Junction railway signal box
