= The Munsters' Scary Little Christmas =

1996 American science fiction comedy film

- Written by: Ed Ferrara; Kevin Murphy
- Directed by: Ian Emes
- Starring: Sam McMurray; Ann Magnuson; Sandy Baron; Elaine Hendrix; Bug Hall
- Music by: Christopher L. Stone
- Country of origin: United States
- Original language: English

Production
- Executive producers: John Landis; Leslie Belzberg
- Producer: Tony Winley
- Cinematography: Roger Lanser
- Editor: M. Scott Smith
- Running time: 91 minutes
- Production company: MCA Television Entertainment

Original release
- Network: Fox
- Release: December 17, 1996

The Munsters' Scary Little Christmas is a 1996 American made-for-television science fiction comedy film featuring characters from the 1960s sitcom The Munsters. It featured a different cast from the original series, the 1980s revival series The Munsters Today and the previous 1995 television film Here Come the Munsters. The movie is set around Christmas time and included character actor Sandy Baron as 'Grandpa'. Baron had played Grandpa's older brother Yorga a few years previously in The Munsters Today.

== Plot ==
The movie begins with son Eddie feeling homesick for Transylvania. Herman decides a "good old Transylvanian Christmas" is what his troubled son needs to get in the mood for the holidays. Together with the family - including Lily, Grandpa and Marilyn, he sends out invitations to the entire Munster family, including Wolfman, Mummy, and the Gill-Man. Herman also asks for a raise from his boss and is fired, taking on other jobs such as modeling nude for an art class, donating blood, and wrapping presents. Meanwhile, on Christmas Eve's eve, one of Grandpa's experiments has gone awry, accidentally transporting Santa Claus and his elves to the Munster Mansion. Christmas faces ruin as there is no way to send Santa home, and the entire family must find a way to save Christmas. Meanwhile, Marilyn falls in love and Lily enters a home decorating contest, with nosy neighbour Edna Dimitty (from the previous Munster movie Here Come the Munsters) causing trouble. Eddie also faces trouble at school from bullies.

== Cast ==
=== Main cast ===
- Sam McMurray as Herman Munster
- Ann Magnuson as Lily Munster
- Bug Hall as Eddie Munster
- Sandy Baron as Grandpa
- Elaine Hendrix as Marilyn

=== Guest cast ===
- Mary Woronov as Mrs. Edna Dimwitty
- Ed Gale as Larry
- Arturo Gil as Lefty
- Mark Mitchell as Santa Claus
- Jeremy Callaghan as Tom
- John Allen as Mr. Pawlikowski
- Noel Ferrier as Door Knocker
- Bruce Spence as Mr. Gateman
- Kate Fischer as Pretty Girl in Bar
- Patricia Howson as Mrs. Matagrano
- Dominic Condon as Spooky Onlooker 1
- Jonathan Biggins as Spooky Onlooker 2
- Alan Zitner as Cop
- Daniel Kellie as Glen
- Michael Hamilton as Hector Barbieri
- Malcolm Mudway as Burly Biker
- Donald Cook as Quasimoto, the Hunchback
- William Ten Eyck as Biker
- David Jobling as Art Teacher

== Production ==
=== Filming ===
The movie was shot at Heathcote Hall, a historic building built in 1887 at Heathcote, New South Wales.

== Broadcast ==
The Munsters' Scary Little Christmas was originally aired on Fox on December 17, 1996. It was acquired by ABC Family, and was added to their 25 Days of Christmas line-up on December 15, 2009. It had been previously shown on the cable network Fox Family Channel, which was later renamed ABC Family.

== Home media ==
It was later released on DVD by Universal Studios on November 6, 2007.
