= Loftus Junction railway signal box =

- Location within Sydney Location within Australia
- 34°02′53″S 151°03′05″E
- Location: Illawarra railway, Loftus, Sutherland Shire, New South Wales, Australia

History
- Built: 1886

Site notes
- Owner: Transport for NSW

New South Wales Heritage Register
- Official name: Loftus Junction railway signal box
- Type: State heritage (built)
- Designated: 2 April 1999
- Reference no.: 1182
- Type: Signal Box
- Category: Transport – Rail

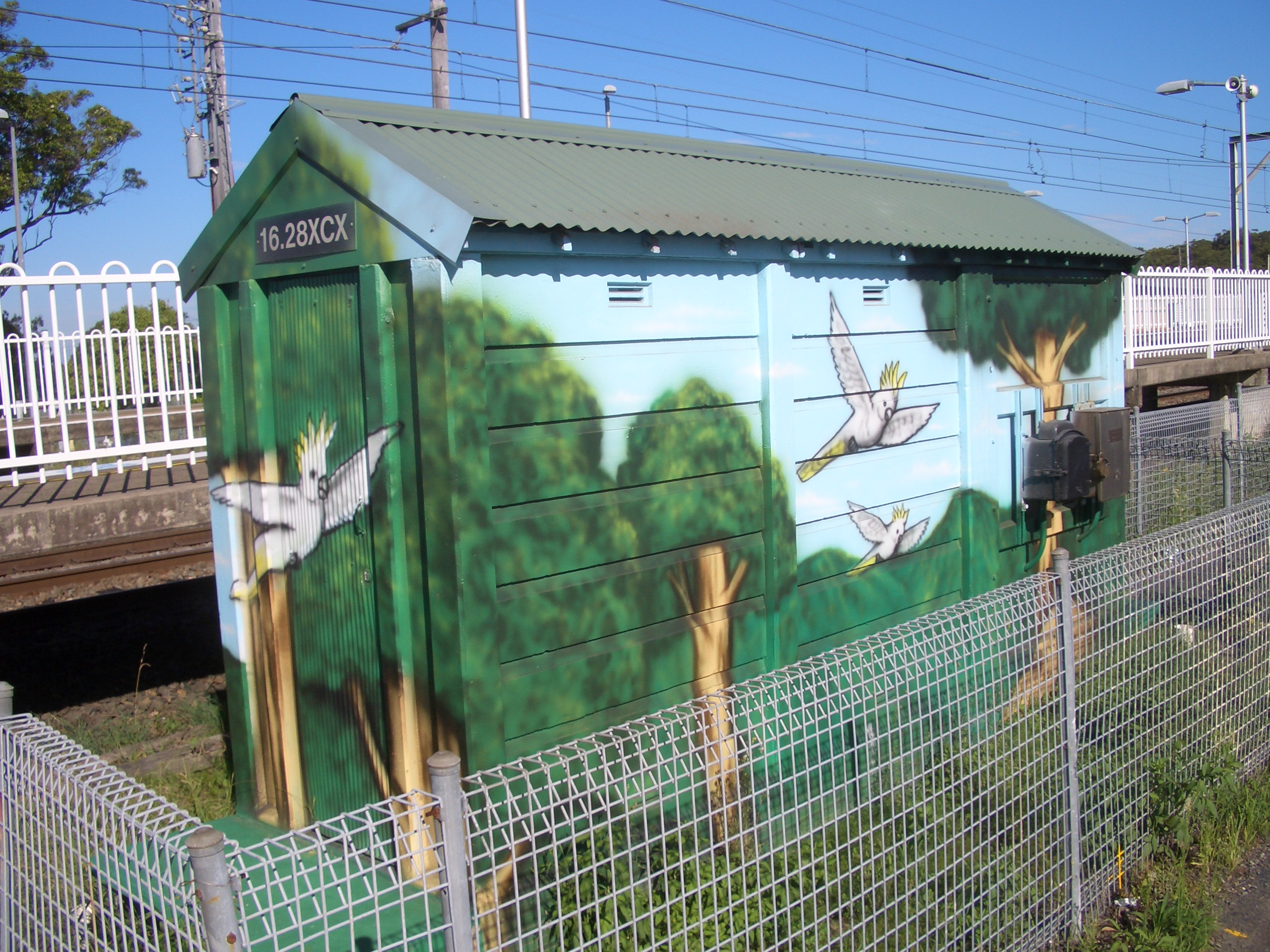
Signal Box, Loftus Railway Station.

The Loftus Junction railway signal box is a heritage-listed disused railway signal box on the Illawarra line at Loftus in the Sutherland Shire local government area of New South Wales, Australia. It was built during 1886. The property is owned by Transport Asset Manager, an agency of Government of New South Wales. It was added to the New South Wales State Heritage Register on 2 April 1999.

== History ==
The Illawarra line was opened from Sutherland to Waterfall in 1886, being constructed by William Rowe and W. Smith. The branch line was also opened in 1886 to a station named Loftus which was the terminus of a single line of 1.6 kilometres (0.99 mi) for military traffic, the Royal National Park then being an army training reserve. The Loftus Junction Signal box was also constructed at this time.

The line was duplicated in 1890 and electrified in 1926.

Initially the timber signal box was built on the southern end of a small timber platform station named Loftus Junction and this was the first signal and track interlocked point on the Illawarra Line, though the National Park was not interlocked until the 1926 electrification. In 1888 the National Park was set aside for public recreation, and the station was then renamed "National Park" undergoing various changes until finally becoming The Royal National Park in 1955. In 1899 a short length of double line was opened from Loftus Junction to a short distance along the branch line to cope with the growth of rail traffic, but in 1944 this was converted back to a single track connection.

Loftus Junction station was renamed Loftus in 1896 and because its location was difficult for starting "Down" trains on the rising 1 in 40 grade, the platforms were moved back towards Sydney in 1917, leaving the original signal box in an isolated situation.

The concrete location huts are likely to have been constructed between 1917-1924 with precast panels manufactured at the Auburn cement works.

After closure in 1991, most of the internal equipment was removed from the signal box and the windows boarded up.

== Description ==
Context

The Loftus Signal Box and two concrete drop-slab location huts are on railway land within the railway corridor east of Loftus Avenue, opposite the intersection of Loftus Avenue and Nattai Street, Loftus.

Junction Signal Box (1886)

The exterior of the signal box has painted brick foundations approx 1m in height. It is a small freestanding gabled weatherboard rectangular building with timber barge boards, and simple short finials with triangular tops. The building has a painted corrugated steel roof without any eaves overhang. A corrugated steel roofed and walled skillion section on the western side is at ground level. Window openings and door to the building have been covered over. On the north side of the building, outside the entry door, is a concrete deck with timber steps and a pipe railing. There is an old fluorescent light and a downpipe across the north elevation. Inside the signal box, no equipment is extant.

=== Condition ===
As at 23 November 2012, the condition of the Signal Box was moderate. The guttering to the building is deteriorated.

The junction and trackage which related to the signal box have been removed, and therefore the context has lost significance. The signal box is now disused. The building has been repainted and windows covered over. Equipment has been removed from the interior. The integrity of the overall structure is low.

=== Modifications and dates ===
- 1891 – Interlocking removed
- 1926 – single line branch auto signalling
- 1991 – frame removed
- N.d. – Corrugated steel addition to side.

== Heritage listing ==
As at 10 July 2014, this was the best surviving example of a small signal box for a remote function from the Victorian period. The building is of excellent proportion, of high visual quality and in relation to the adjacent tramway museum forms an extremely important element of the south coast railway system. The box has a typically elevated floor to allow the signal equipment to operate under it and was designed to work the junction points and signals. The building has a pitched gable ended corrugated iron roof without eaves overhang. Access is through a door in the up end and a small timber staircase. Windows extend around three sides. The scale of the building is small reflecting the size of the location.

Loftus Junction railway signal box was listed on the New South Wales State Heritage Register on 2 April 1999.

== See also ==
- Loftus railway station, Sydney
