= Engadine railway station =

Railway station in Sydney, Australia

Engadine
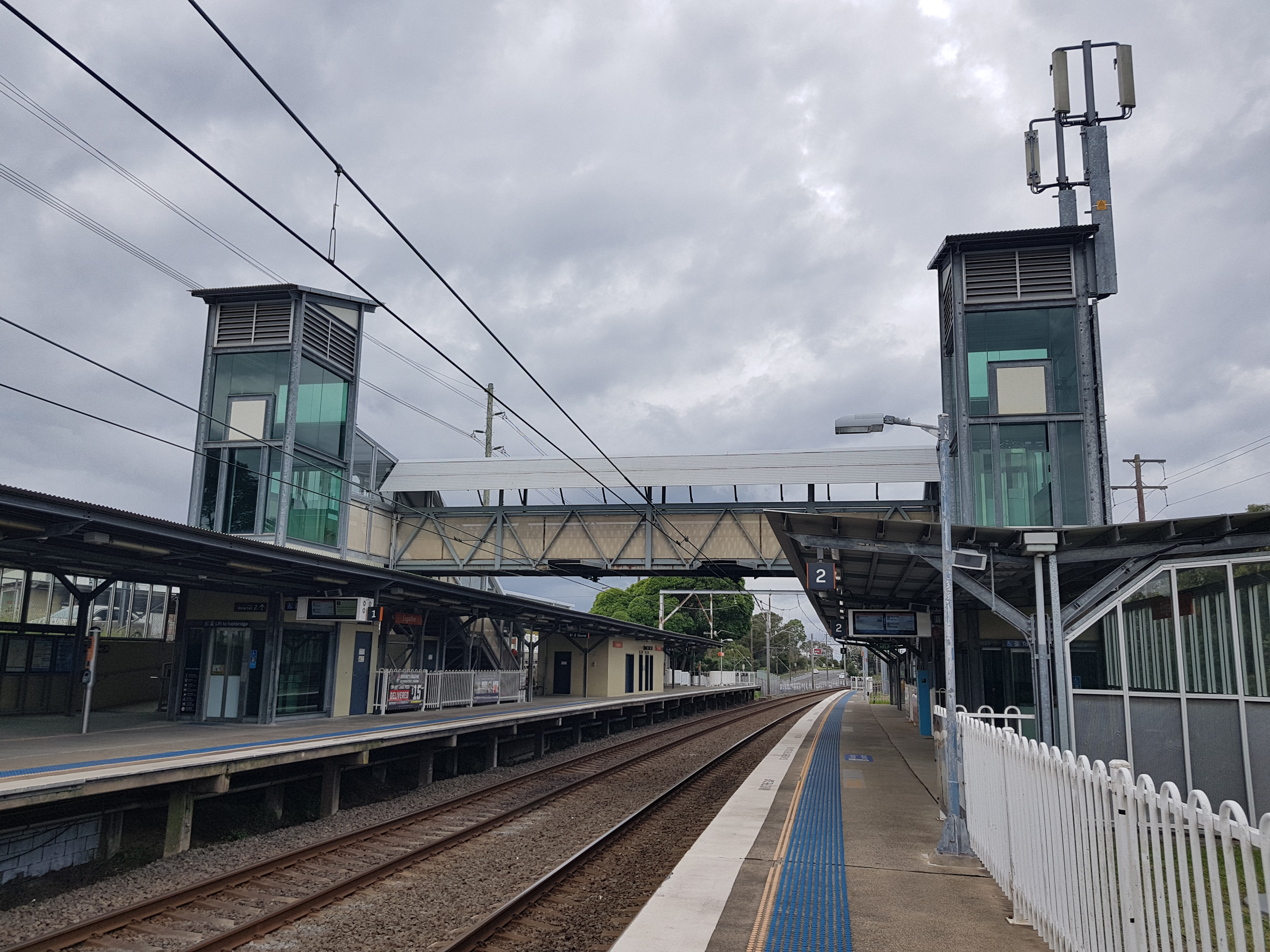
- Northbound view from Platform 2 in April 2020

General information
- Location: Princes Highway, Engadine; Sydney, New South Wales; Australia
- Coordinates: 34°04′03″S 151°00′53″E
- Elevation: 183 metres (600 ft)
- Owner: Transport Asset Manager of NSW
- Operator: Sydney Trains
- Line: South Coast
- Distance: 30.75 km (19.11 mi) from Central
- Platforms: 2 (2 side)
- Tracks: 2
- Connections: Bus

Construction
- Structure type: Ground
- Accessible: Yes

Other information
- Status: Weekdays: Staffed: 6am to 7pm: Weekends and public holidays: Staffed: 8am to 4pm
- Station code: EGD
- Website: Transport for NSW

History
- Opened: 1 October 1920 (105 years ago)
- Electrified: Yes (from July 1980)

Passengers
- 2025: 600,781 (year); 1,646 (daily) (Sydney Trains)
- Rank: 150

Services
Preceding station	Sydney Trains	Following station
Heathcote towards Waterfall	Eastern Suburbs & Illawarra Line	Loftus towards Bondi Junction
Preceding station	Intercity Trains	Following station
Heathcote towards Kiama or Port Kembla	South Coast Line (peak hour services)	Loftus towards Central or Bondi Junction
Location

Engadine railway station is a suburban railway station on the South Coast line, serving the Sydney suburb of Engadine. It is served by Sydney Trains T4 Eastern Suburbs & Illawarra Line services and limited intercity South Coast Line services.

== History ==
Engadine station opened on 1 October 1920 as an infill station.

The station was extensively upgraded in 2002 with the provision of extended shelters and passenger lifts between the platforms and the overhead footbridge.

== Services ==
=== Platforms ===
Platform	Line	Stopping pattern	Notes
1	T4	services to Bondi Junction	
1	SCO	services to Bondi Junction	limited weekday morning services
2	T4	services to Waterfall & Helensburgh	
2	SCO	services to Kiama; 1 weekday morning service to Port Kembla	limited weekday morning services

=== Transport links ===
Premier Motor Service operates a daily coach from Sydney to Eden via Engadine station.

U-Go Mobility operates five bus routes via Engadine station, under contract to Transport for NSW:

- 991: Sutherland station to Heathcote
- 992: to Kingswood Road
- 993: Westfield Miranda to Woronora Heights
- 996: to Heathcote East
- 989: on Wednesdays to Bundeena, subcontracted to Maianbar Bundeena Bus Service
