= Heathcote Hall =

- Location within Sydney
- 34°05′16″S 151°00′53″E
- Location: 1–21 Dillwynnia Grove, Heathcote, Sutherland Shire, New South Wales, Australia

History
- Built: 1887

Site notes
- Architect: Thomas Rowe

New South Wales Heritage Register
- Official name: Heathcote Hall; Heathcote Hall and Grounds; Bottle Forest
- Type: State heritage (complex / group)
- Designated: 2 April 1999
- Reference no.: 191
- Type: Mansion
- Category: Residential buildings (private)
- Builders: Abel Harber

Heathcote Hall is a heritage-listed private residence at 1–21 Dillwynnia Grove, Heathcote, New South Wales, a suburb of Sydney, Australia. It was designed by Thomas Rowe and built by Abel Harber. It is also known as Heathcote Hall and Grounds; and Bottle Forest. The property is privately owned. It was added to the New South Wales State Heritage Register on 2 April 1999.

== History ==
=== Heathcote ===
The development of the setting was primarily in response to construction of the Illawarra Railway line and extension of this line to this area in the 1880s. Early in 1886 the line was opened up as far as Waterfall. Up until then Heathcote was known as Bottle Forest. Bottle Forest proper and embraced an area of about 200 acres (81 ha). This little pocket of fertile country extends north from Heathcote railway station for about 1/2 mile (0.80 km), with the railway as its western boundary, runs back to the east in Royal National Park for about 3/4 mile (1.2 km), over the crest of the Great Dividing Range, between the watershed of the Port Hacking and Woronora Rivers.

The new settlement of Como came alive with the construction of the railway bridge over the Georges River. Soon railway camps were set up at Sutherland township, Heathcote and Waterfall. Construction of the long tunnels near Helensburgh employed skilled contractors and consumed millions of bricks. Many were made at the brickworks established by Abel Harber at Heathcote. At the 1891 census most people lived at Sylvania and settlements clustered along the line at Sutherland, Como, Heathcote and Waterfall.

The establishment of Australia's first National Park (Royal National Park) in 1879 also began to attract people to Sydney's south. Heathcote was one of a number of suburbs within the Shire of Sutherland that were to be established adjacent to land reserved as national park.

Heathcote retained its bushland setting for a number of years. It remained relatively undeveloped as a suburb until the 1920s, despite having a station in the vicinity. No doubt the reason for this neglect on the part of home-seekers lies in the fact that the Bottle Forest area, which adjoins the railway and embraces the most fertile soil and greatest elevation, had been locked up in two large family estates and never thrown open to the public for purchase.

=== Heathcote Hall estate ===
In the 1920s the Heathcote Hall estate was surveyed and the former 50-acre (20 ha) lot subdivided into numerous 1/4-acre (0.10 ha) blocks. Heathcote Hall was retained on a 4-acre (1.6 ha) block. The lot boundary has remained unchanged since.

=== Heathcote Hall ===
Some 50 acres (20 ha) of freehold land was purchased about 1879 by Mr Abel Harber, a wealthy brickmaker of that period. He built Heathcote Hall in 1887 and located it on the highest point of his land.

The hall was designed by leading Sydney architectural firm, Rowe and Green, for a sum of £7000.

Unfortunately, following financial losses in connection with the building of the Imperial Arcade, Sydney, Harber abandoned Heathcote Hall for the benefit of his creditors. However the mortgagees who took possession in 1892 did not find the estate a disposable proposition, for New South Wales was then in the throes of the temporary financial collapse of the 1890s.

The Financial Institution, which had become the possessor, made arrangements with George Adams of Tattersalls to dispose of it by lottery. Issued from Brisbane, Heathcote Hall was made first prize at a value of seven thousand pounds. The winning ticket was held by Mr Samuel Gillette, a Sydney builder. He retained ownership for five years and then sold the whole estate for much less than its valuation. A mansion and park at Heathcote before the advent of the motorcar and with only one train a day service was not a good proposition for a city businessman struggling through the competitive times of the 1890s.

Gillette sold the estate to Mrs Jessie Fotheringham Brown in 1901.

Early in 1901, Mr R R Brown purchased Heathcote Hall with the intention of retiring there for the few short months of life that leading Sydney medical men had advised was left to him. However Mr Brown confounded his medical advisers and lived there until about 1923.

During the 1920s it was used for public tea rooms and limited accommodation, as well as a 36-hole putting green available for public use.

In 1927 the 50-acre (20 ha) property was subdivided into 168 suburban lots with Heathcote Hall remaining on a 4-acre (1.6 ha) block. Blocks sold very slowly, and in 1945, the Heathcote Hall Estate Ltd. sold the reduced 4-acre (1.6 ha) Hall block to Mrs Mimina Farrelly, wife of Mr Joseph Farrelly. The property was in the ownership of the Farrelly family for 70 years and land on the northern part of the property was used for stabling and training of horses since the 1970s.

Joseph and Mimina Farrelly bought Heathcote Hall in 1942, along with her parents Anzelese & Jose. Joseph and Mimina raised three children here, Michael, Ramon and Maxine. After Mimina's death in 1986, Maxine stayed on, caring for her father and nursing him before he died in 2005 at age 86. She noted the tower was her favourite part, accessed by a narrow, winding staircase. Before trees obscured the view, she said it was possible to view the waves breaking on Jibbon Beach at Bundeena from here. Ms Farrelly sought to preserve Heathcote Hall and undertook some renovation works. The property was left to be shared by the children.

In 2000 the Heritage Council of NSW provided a grant of $150,000 to undertake emergency works on the property, notably the hall's tower.

The Farrelly family continued to live in the property until January 2016 when it was sold to Fuzortinn P/L. The new owner proposes to restore the building and develop townhouses and apartments on the site.

As of 2024 the property surrounding Heathcote Hall has undergone major development with a combination of Town House and Apartment buildings now established with residents now moved in. Heathcote Hall itself has now been completely restored in a restoration project that took place over three years and is currently on the market for the first time in over 100 years.

== Description ==
Mansion

Heathcote Hall is designed in the Victorian Italianate style. The house is a two-storey brick structure rendered and scribed to look like sandstone. On three sides is a two-storey verandah colonnaded on the ground floor, with a cast iron balustrade and cast iron columns supporting the verandah roof of bull-nosed corrugated iron.

The tall tower with its glazed turret and balcony is still a prominent landmark above the surrounding trees.

Ancillary buildings

There are a small number of ancillary buildings around the site In line with the rear of the house and near the northern boundary of its garden is a small WC building in brick and corrugated iron. This is hooked up to a septic system.

Remnants of a small garden shed remain on the eastern boundary near the rear gate from Tecoma Street and the eastern wall of the shed actually makes up part of the rear back fence.

A more recent timber-framed structure is partly constructed on the southern side of the Tecoma Street gate. This has a galvanised steel roof but is not fully enclosed. It is being used to store building materials.

Immediately south of the timber-framed structure is the remains of the foundation of a building which the owner has identified as dating from around the 1950s but which was never completed. However, these foundations appear to possibly be dated from the very early period of the estate as a small building shows in this location on the Certificate of Title for transfer of this portion of the land to Abel Harber dated 1889. A coach house building was originally located just to the north inside the existing rear gate on Tecoma Street. The remnants of the coach house were demolished (c.1945) soon after the present owners took up residence and the bricks were used to fill the ground at the rear of the main house. This area has archaeological potential and any excavation or disturbance of the ground in this area of the yard should be done under the supervision of a qualified historical archaeologist.

Immediately south of the main house is a reasonably modern laundry building which houses a laundry and storage shed. It is constructed of timber frame and lined with fibro and lattice.

Outside the main formal garden area of the house is the remnant of the larger estate. A number of stables constructed of timber frame and corrugated iron and steel are located in both the north-eastern and western sections of this area of the site. The ages of these stables vary with some showing evidence of being very old while others are more recent.

The present owners stabled horses from the earliest days of their occupation in 1945 so some remnant stable structures in this complex could be approaching 60 years old and be an important part of the evolutionary process of the estate. There is visual evidence that some of the structures are quite old and therefore the entire complex should be the subject of a further assessment by a qualified consultant prior to the removal of any fabric.

The fencing around the property has been replaced in recent years but there is the remnant of an original iron archway and gate, immediately south of the front of the house giving access to Dillwynnia Grove.

=== Condition ===
At 14 June 2024, Physical condition was excellent due to a major renovation. Archaeological potential is high.

=== Update ===
As of 2024, the restoration project initiated in 2021 has concluded. The building and surrounding area, now reduced from their previous size in 2021, have been placed on the market for sale.

== Heritage listing ==
As at 23 November 2004, Heathcote Hall was an imposing two storey building designed in the Victorian Italianate style and is one of the oldest and grandest buildings in the Sutherland Shire. Built in 1887 by Abel Harber a wealthy Sydney brick maker who forfeited the residence following financial losses he made in connection with the building of the Imperial Arcade in Sydney. It is a particularly striking building whose tower is a prominent landmark in Heathcote.

Heathcote Hall was listed on the New South Wales State Heritage Register on 2 April 1999.

== See also ==
- Australian residential architectural styles
