= Joseph Thomas Burton-Gibbs =

Joseph Thomas Burton-Gibbs was one of Sydney's "oldest business identities". Born in Derby, England, Burton-Gibbs emigrated to Melbourne in 1853 aboard the ship Indian Queen. In 1866 he helped establish a printing and publishing house, Clarson, Shallard & Co, with partners Joseph Shallard, Alfred Henry Massina and William Clarson. In 1862 he moved to Sydney to open a branch of the company at 207 Pitt Street. Although the original partnership was dissolved in 1866, Burton-Gibbs continued his partnership with Joseph Shallard, trading as Gibbs, Shallard and Co, which went on to become a leading printer and publisher in the city. One well-known publication was the Illustrated Sydney News. In 1889, he became a founding director of the Imperial Arcade Company Ltd which developed the Imperial Arcade, Sydney.

Burton-Gibbs died on 28 January 1925 at his home "Hillcrest", Church Street, Randwick, and was buried in Rookwood Cemetery.
