= Heathcote railway station =

Railway station in Sydney, Australia

Heathcote
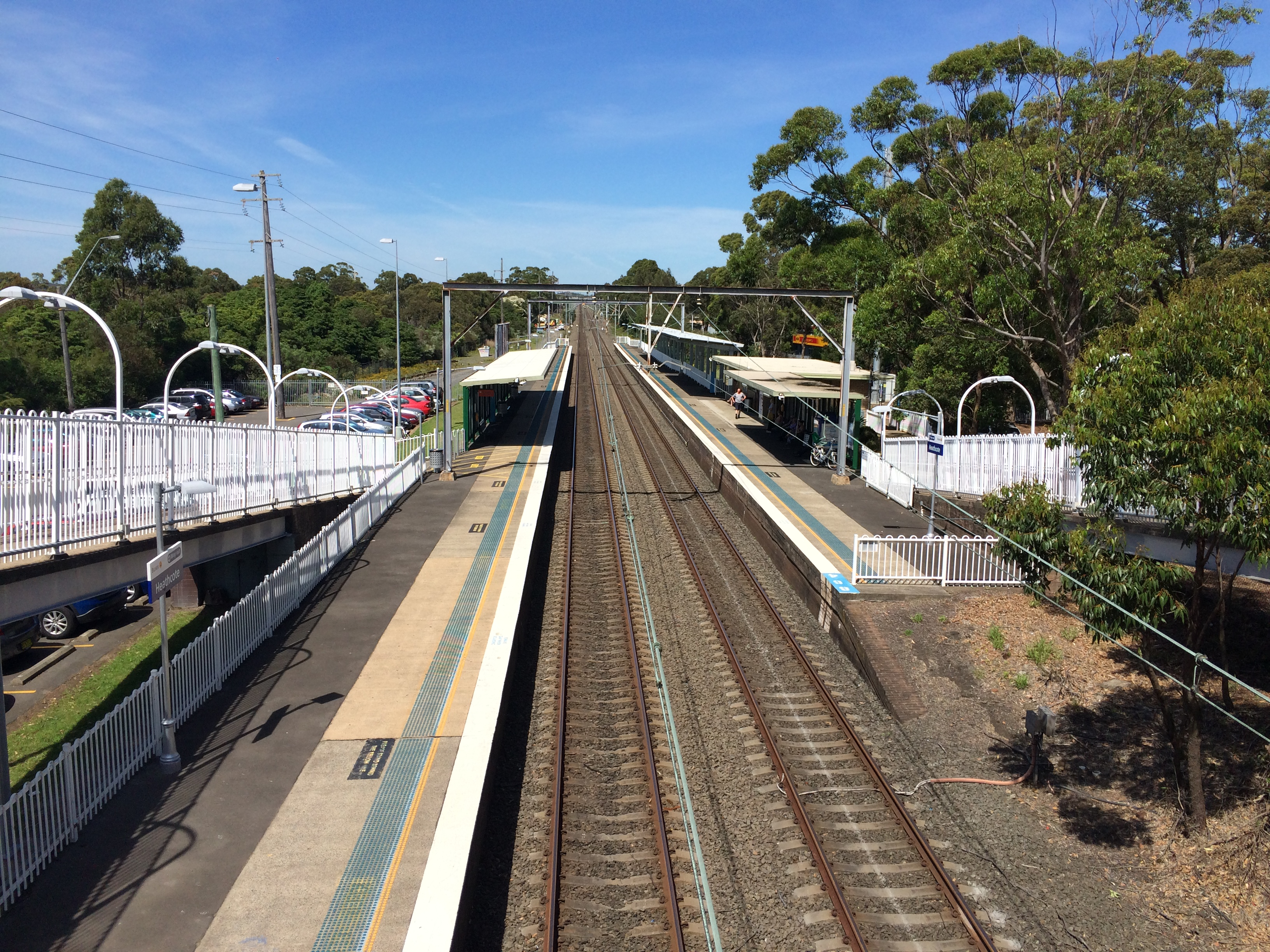
- Southbound view of the station platforms from the footbridge in November 2015

General information
- Location: Princes Highway, Heathcote; Sydney, New South Wales; Australia
- Coordinates: 34°05′18″S 151°00′29″E
- Elevation: 193 metres (633 ft)
- Owner: Transport Asset Manager of NSW
- Operator: Sydney Trains
- Line: South Coast
- Distance: 33.15 km (20.60 mi) from Central
- Platforms: 2 (2 side)
- Tracks: 2
- Connections: Bus

Construction
- Structure type: Ground
- Accessible: Yes

Other information
- Status: Weekdays: Staffed: 6am to 7pm: Weekends and public holidays: Staffed: 8am to 4pm
- Station code: HTC
- Website: Transport for NSW

History
- Opened: 9 March 1886 (140 years ago)
- Electrified: Yes (from July 1980)

Passengers
- 2025: 259,512 (year); 711 (daily) (Sydney Trains)
- Rank: 181

Services
Preceding station	Sydney Trains	Following station
Waterfall Terminus	Eastern Suburbs & Illawarra Line	Engadine towards Bondi Junction
Preceding station	Intercity Trains	Following station
Waterfall towards Kiama or Port Kembla	South Coast Line (peak hour services)	Engadine towards Central or Bondi Junction
Location

Heathcote railway station is a suburban railway station located on the South Coast line, serving the Sydney suburb of Heathcote. It is served by Sydney Trains T4 Eastern Suburbs & Illawarra Line services and limited intercity South Coast Line services. Station facilities include public toilets and a car park.

== History ==
Heathcote station opened on 9 March 1886 when the South Coast line was extended from Sutherland to Waterfall. Upgrades to the station, including a new footbridge with lifts, were completed in January 2017. The contract for these upgrades was awarded in July 2015.

== Services ==
=== Platforms ===
Platform	Line	Stopping pattern	Notes
1	T4	services to Bondi Junction	
1	SCO	services to Bondi Junction	limited weekday morning services
2	T4	services to Waterfall & Helensburgh	
2	SCO	services to Kiama; 1 weekday morning service to Port Kembla	limited weekday morning services

=== Transport links ===
U-Go Mobility operates two bus routes via Heathcote station, under contract to Transport for NSW:

- 991: Heathcote to Sutherland station
- 996: Engadine to Heathcote East
