= Loftus, New South Wales =

Loftus
- Suburb
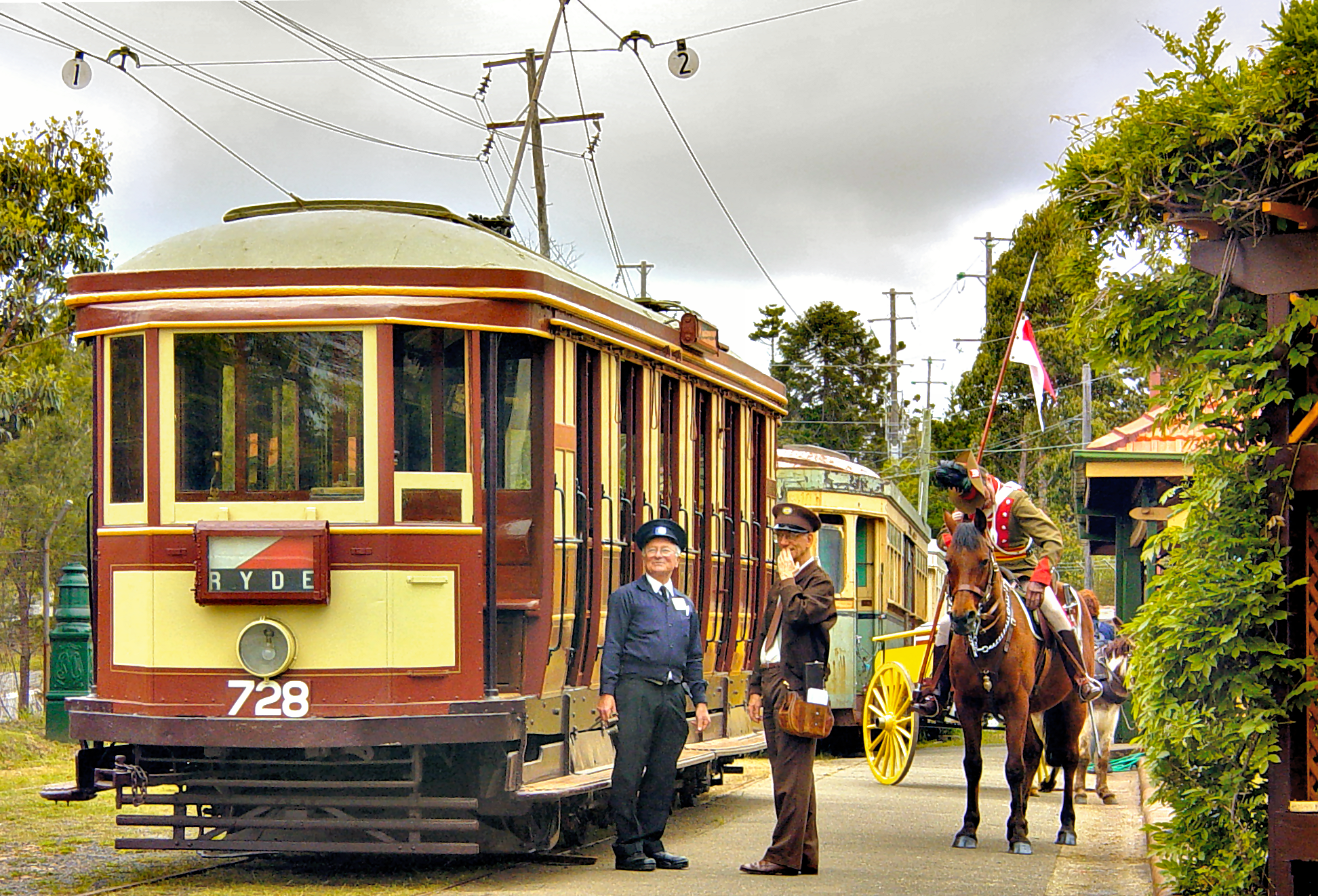
- Sydney Tramway Museum

- Interactive map of Loftus
- Country: Australia
- State: New South Wales
- City: Sydney
- LGA: Sutherland Shire
- Location: 29 km (18 mi) south of Sydney CBD; 53 km (33 mi) north of Wollongong

Government
  - State electorate: Heathcote
  - Federal division: Hughes
- Elevation: 104 m (341 ft)

Population
  - Total: 4,190 (2021 census)
- Postcode: 2232
Suburbs around Loftus
Woronora Heights	Woronora	Sutherland
Lucas Heights	Loftus	Kirrawee
Engadine	Yarrawarrah	Royal National Park

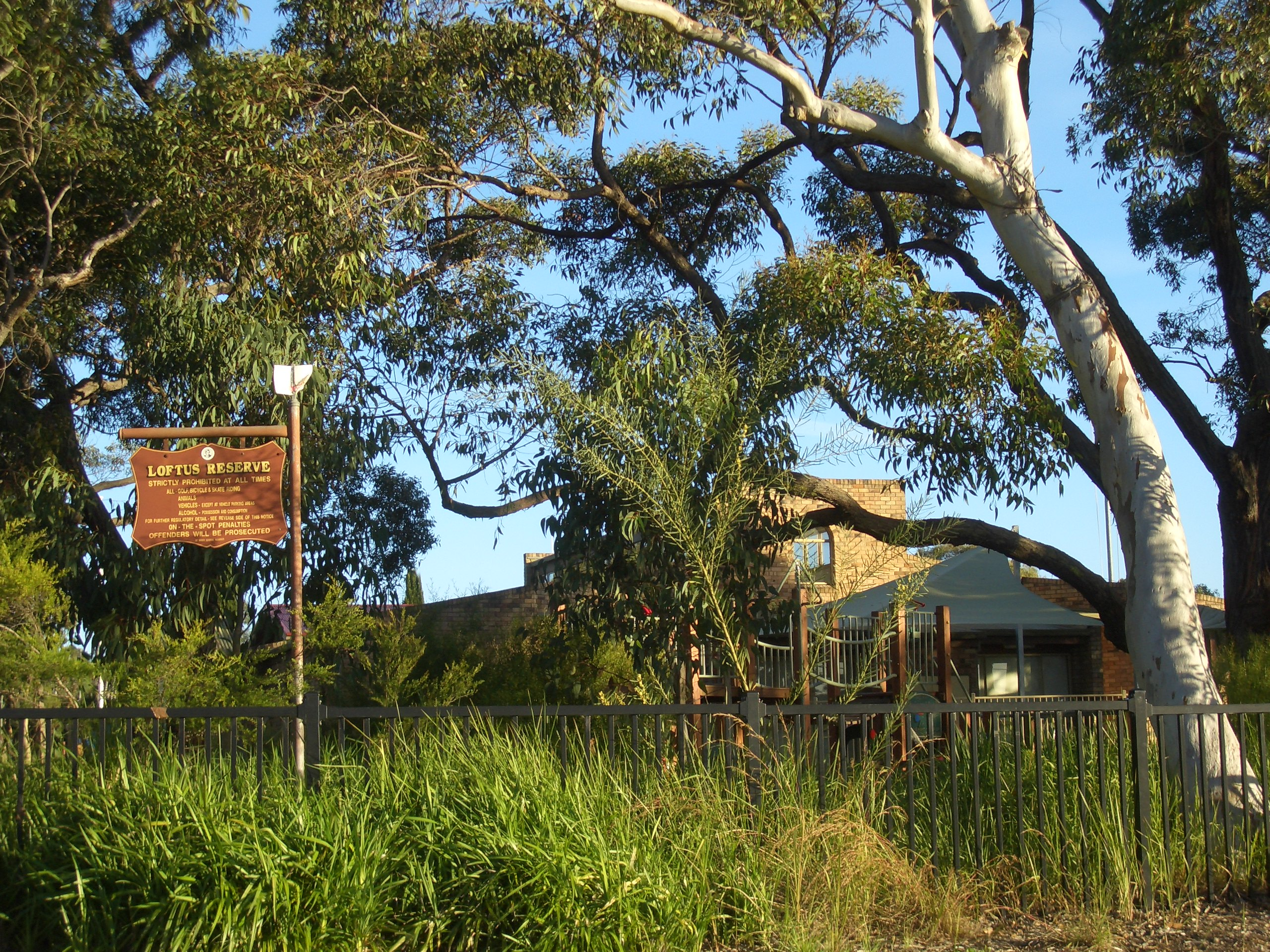
Loftus Reserve

Loftus is a suburb, in southern Sydney, in the state of New South Wales, Australia. Loftus is 29 kilometres south of the Sydney central business district, in the local government area of the Sutherland Shire.

== History ==
Loftus was named after Lord Augustus William Frederick Spencer Loftus, governor of New South Wales between 1878 and 1885. The Illawarra railway line to Sutherland was completed in 1885. The next station south was Loftus Junction, which opened on 9 March 1886. The name was changed to Loftus ten years later and in 1979 the station moved to the present site.

The Sydney Tramway Museum at Loftus (a non-profit community organisation run entirely by volunteers) was created in 1950, in a large tram yard shed beside the rail tracks that ran across the Princes Highway into the Royal National Park. During the latter years of World War II this had been an army camp site, with the national park used as a training ground. The public school opened in January 1953. The official post office opened in July 1953 but closed in 1980.

== Heritage listings ==
Loftus has a number of heritage-listed sites, including:

- Illawarra railway: Loftus Junction railway signal box

== Demographics ==
In the 2021 Census, there were 4,190 people in Loftus. 86.2% of people were born in Australia. The next most common country of birth was England at 3.1%. 92.7% of people spoke only English at home. The most common responses for religion were No Religion 39.0%, Catholic 28.1% and Anglican 15.9%.

== Geography ==
Loftus is a residential suburb with a bushland atmosphere, adjacent to the Royal National Park that flanks Sydney's south-eastern boundary. The western border is formed by Loftus and Fahy Creeks. Prince Edward Park and Woronora Cemetery form the northern border.

== Transport ==
The Princes Highway runs along the eastern border. Loftus railway station is on the Illawarra railway line and is part of the Sydney Trains network and serves as an interchange for U-Go Mobility bus services to the area.

Loftus is also home to the Sydney Tramway Museum (also known as the South Pacific Electric Railway), which operates the Royal National Park branch line that was constructed in 1886 and closed to suburban trains in June 1991. The service provided by the museum is a most popular means of access to the Royal National Park. The line runs from the museum to Royal National Park railway station.

== Schools ==
Loftus Public School is located in National Avenue. The Southern Sydney Institute of TAFE, Loftus Campus and the University of Wollongong, Loftus Campus are located next to the railway station. Camp Wonawong is a youth camp located beside Loftus Creek.

== Services ==
Loftus Rural Fire Service is situated opposite Loftus train station and protects the bush interface of Loftus, Yarrawarrah, Sutherland, Jannali, Como and the Royal National Park.

== Sport and recreation ==
Loftus has various social and sporting clubs which include:

- Loftus Cricket Club
- Loftus Yarrawarrah Rovers Football Club
- Loftus Zircons Netball Club
- 1st Loftus Scouts
- West Shire Combined Venturer Unit
- Loftus Underground Organisation (LUGOS)
- Loftus Bandits
- Pit Masters
- Grommies
- Sutherland Loftus United (Rugby League)

== Notable residents ==
- Adam Hills, comedian
