= Engadine, New South Wales =

Engadine
- Suburb
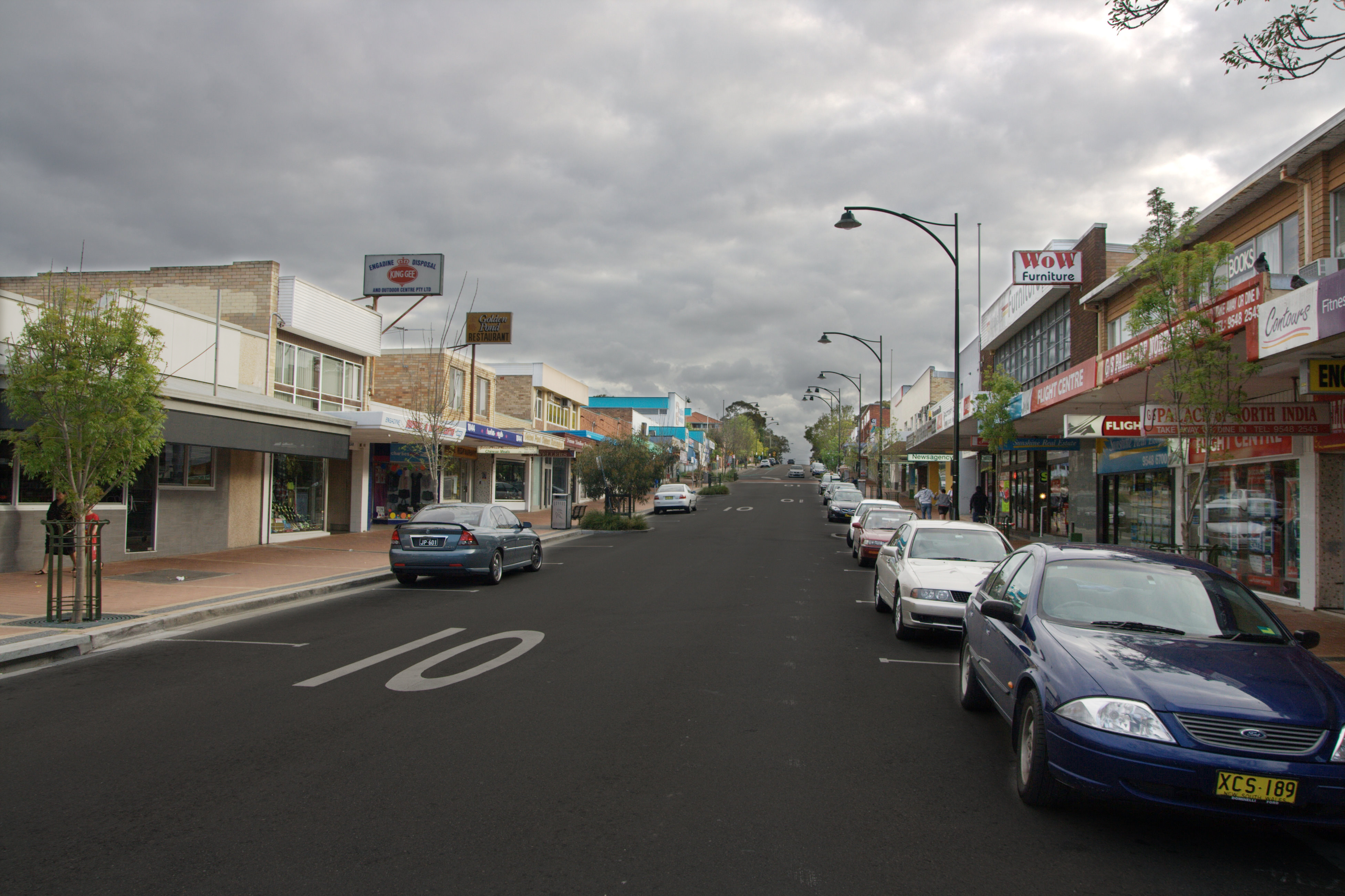
- Shops on Old Princes Hwy

- Interactive map of Engadine
- Country: Australia
- State: New South Wales
- City: Sydney
- LGA: Sutherland Shire
- Location: 33 km (21 mi) S of Sydney CBD; 49 km (30 mi) N of Wollongong

Government
  - State electorate: Heathcote
  - Federal division: Hughes
- Elevation: 196 m (643 ft)

Population
  - Total: 17,736 (SAL 2021)
- Time zone: UTC+10 (AEST)
  - Summer (DST): UTC+11 (AEDT)
- Postcode: 2233
Suburbs around Engadine
Woronora Heights	Woronora	Loftus
Lucas Heights	Engadine	Yarrawarrah
Holsworthy	Heathcote	Royal National Park

Engadine is a suburb in southern Sydney, in the state of New South Wales,Australia. Engadine is located 33 kilometres (21 mi) south of the Sydney central business district, in the local government area of the Sutherland Shire.

== History ==
The area was reserved for a national park in 1879, but in 1890 Charles McAlister was able to purchase land here which became known as McAlister's Estate. After an overseas trip, the family renamed their estate 'Engadine' after the Engadin Valley in Switzerland. The wildflowers in the valley here and surrounding national parks were reminiscent of the valley and hills in Engadine.

Charles McAlister subdivided his land sometime after 1900. He continued to live in Engadine but later moved to Cronulla, where he died in 1915.

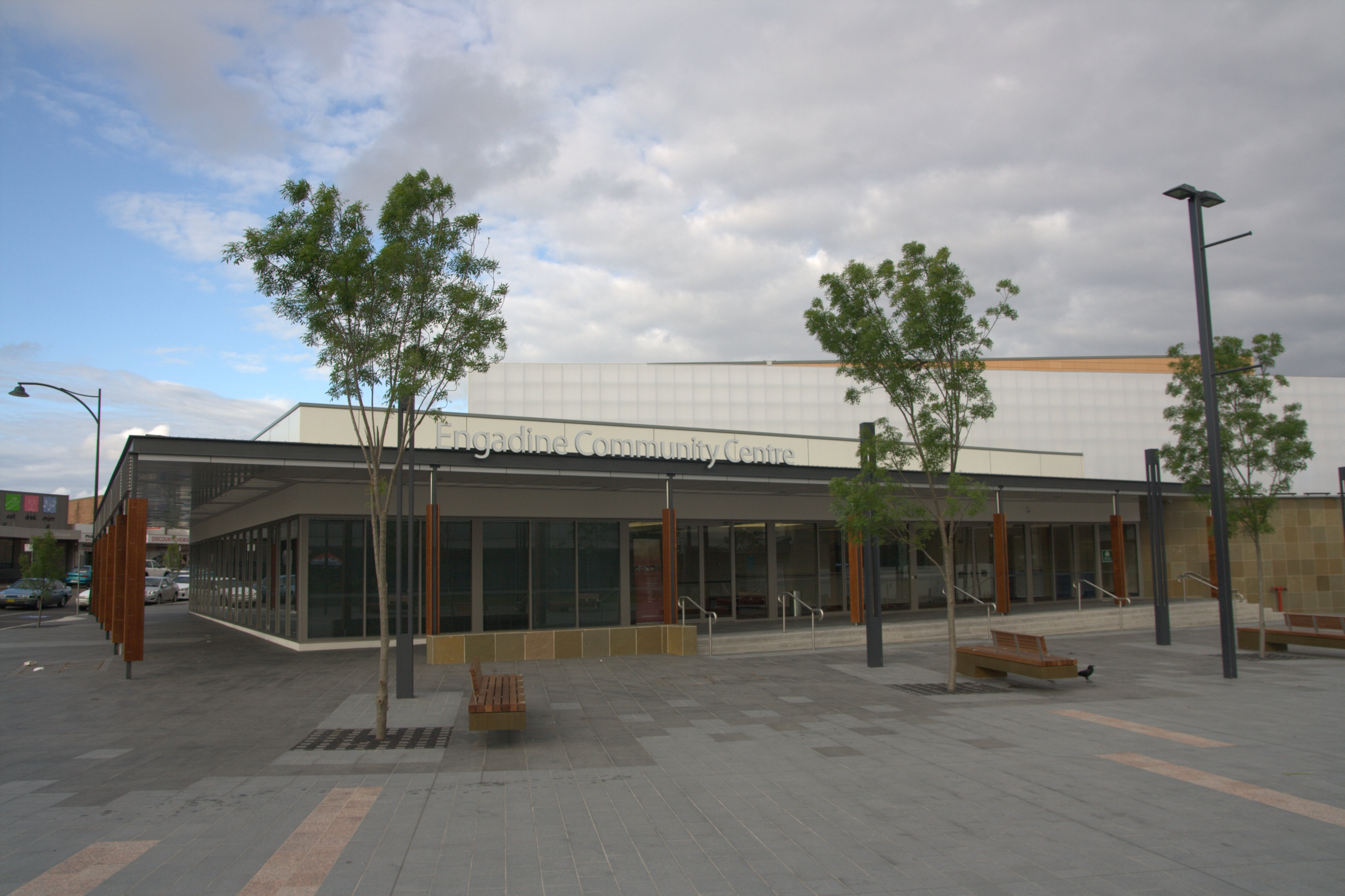
Engadine Community Centre (October 2010)

Originally settled for grazing land, Engadine soon became a destination for camping and day-trips from the inner-Sydney suburbs. It remained isolated until 1920 when the railway station was built (with some funds donated by the local population). Many ex-soldiers settled here after World War I and several streets here recall this war and others as well, such as Anzac, Tobruk, Amiens, Bullecourt, Villers Brett, and Nelson.

Dunlea Centre, Australia's original Boys' Town, in the western part of the suburb was modelled on the American Boys Town institution. The residential school and day programs help children, regardless of their religious background, who have not been able to conform to the rules of society. It was founded in 1939 by Thomas Dunlea who was principal from 1939 to 1951.

The post office was opened on 1 January 1927 and the school opened in September 1932. In the 1960s, the district became more established as a residential area and Crown Land was released for private purchase. The remaining land-parcels were developed in the 1990s, in North Engadine and Woronora Heights.

In 1997, former Australian prime minister Scott Morrison allegedly suffered an episode of fecal incontinence at a McDonald's restaurant in the suburb during the 1997 Super League Grand Final. There is a plaque outside the restaurant that commemorates the incident.

== Landmarks ==
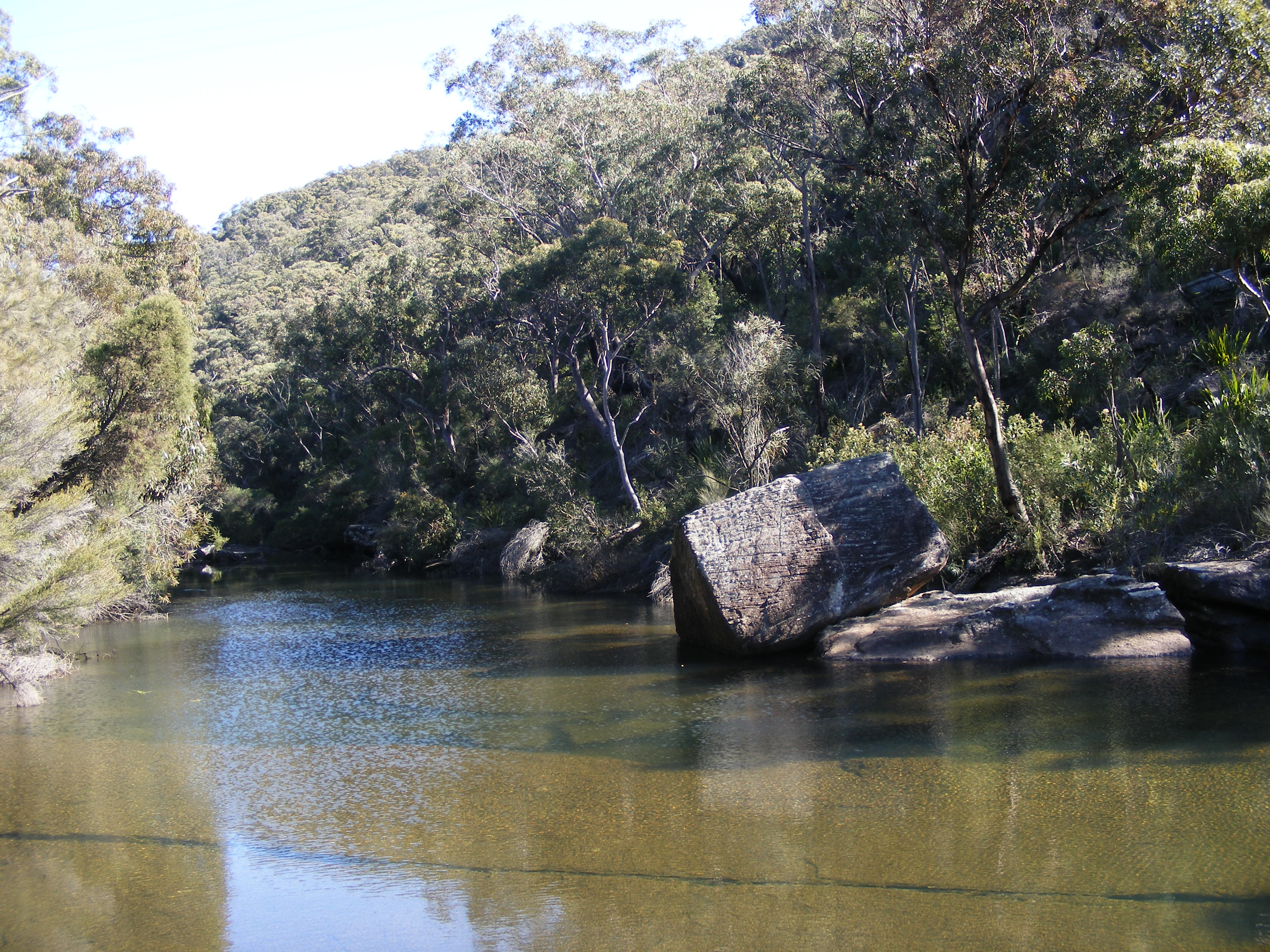
Heathcote National Park.

Engadine is bounded by the Royal National Park to the east, and Heathcote National Park to the west. Visitors to the suburb can view across the Sydney Basin from its southern edge northwards to the Sydney CBD. The area also features rolling sandstone slopes and cliffs in places, with an abundance of native trees throughout. Natural landmarks include 'the Needles' and 'the Blue Lagoon' along the Woronora River, and the Engadine Wetlands to the east of the railway station.

== Commercial area ==
Engadine is mostly residential with some commercial and light industrial areas. The commercial area is located close to Engadine railway station and the Princes Highway. A shopping centre called Engadine Central includes supermarkets, grocery and specialty shops and Engadine Library.

== Transport ==
Engadine railway station is on the Illawarra line of the Sydney Trains network. It is located close to the Princes Highway. Bus Routes 991, 992, 993 and 996 are served by U-Go Mobility.

A road built by using soft plastics and glass mixed with recycled asphalt has been laid on the Old Princes Highway between Cooper Street and Engadine Road.

== Schools ==
- Engadine High School
- Engadine Public School
- Engadine West Public School
- Marton Public School
- St John Bosco College
- St John Bosco Primary School

== Churches ==
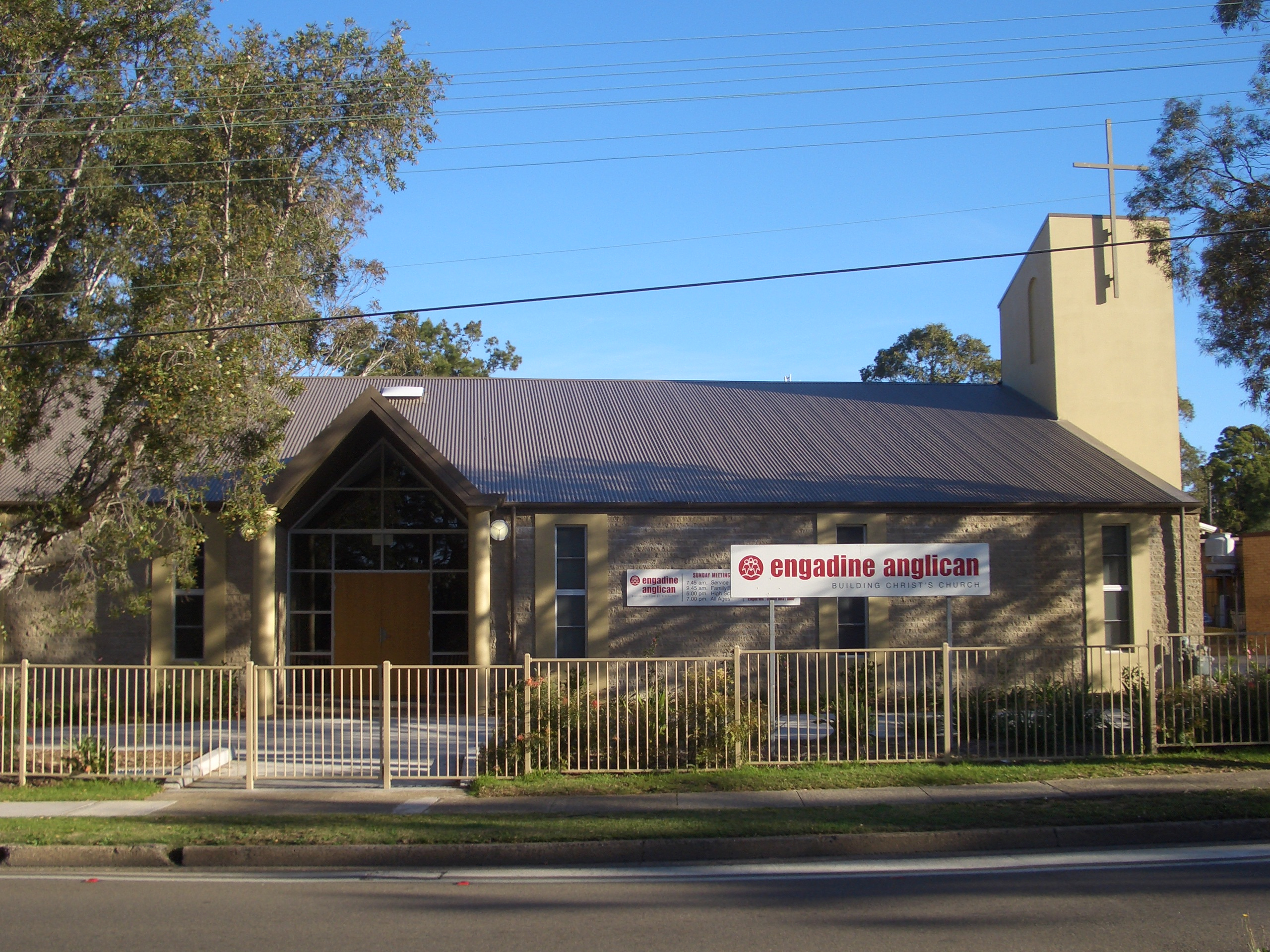
Engadine Anglican Church

- Connect Church
- Engadine Anglican Church
- Engadine Congregational Church
- Engadine Jehovah's Witnesses
- Engadine Presbyterian Church
- Engadine Uniting Church
- Exclusive Brethren
- Heathcote-Engadine Baptist Church
- Salvation Army
- Southern Cross Baptist Church
- St John Bosco Catholic Church

== Community ==
The Engadine community revolves around the town centre which comprises boutique shops, banks, restaurants, cafes, and three of the major supermarkets. At the heart of the township is the Engadine Community Centre which is a public meeting space and houses Essential Community Solutions (ECS). ECS is a not for profit, non-government community-based organization. Established in the 1970s ECS works to enhance community capacity through the provision of programs and services for the aged, youth, children, families, individuals, people with a disability, their carers and the community as a whole.

Engadine District Youth Services (EDYS) provides free community assistance to the local youth, providing a safe, non-judgmental space where Young People can relax with friends, get involved in fun activities and also explore challenges or decisions they may be facing with the support of qualified Youth Workers. Most of the local churches also run community playtime groups for parents with pre-schoolers and also run community youth groups.

Annual free community events include the Rotary Club of Engadine's 'Carols for the People' (Cooper St Park) around Christmas each year since 2007; McAlister Community Fete run by the Lions Club with rides and stalls run at Cooper St Park annually since 1988; and 'Q Club' – a free daily kids program for primary aged kids in the community, running in the second week of the winter holidays at the Baptist Church every year since 1995.

== Population ==
According to the 2021 census, there were 17,736 people in Engadine.

- Aboriginal and Torres Strait Islander people made up 1.8% of the population.
- The most common ancestries included Australian 44.2%, English 43.0%, Irish 13.3%, Scottish 10.5%, and Italian 3.8%.
- 84.8% of people were born in Australia; the next most common countries of birth included England 3.7%, New Zealand 1.0%, China (excluding Special Administrative Regions (SARs) and Taiwan) 0.5%, Scotland 0.4%, and the Philippines 0.4%.
- 91.4% of people spoke only English at home; the next most common languages spoken at home included Mandarin 0.6%, Spanish 0.6%, Russian 0.4%, Greek 0.4%, and German 0.3%.
- The most common responses for religion included No Religion 36.4%, Catholic 28.6%, Anglican 18.1%, Uniting Church 2.2%; a further 3.3% of respondents for this area elected not to disclose their religious status.

== Notable people ==
- Les Bursill – Aboriginal historian and archaeologist
- Billy Dib – World Champion Boxer, IBF Featherweight Champion (2011–2013)
- Thomas Dunlea – Founder of Dunlea Centre, Australia's original Boys' Town
- Robbie Kearns – Rugby League player
- Rodney Martin – squash player
- Paul O'Grady – soccer player
- Robert Stone – (1956–2005), Rugby League player for St. George Dragons
- Markus Zusak – Author
