= Heathcote, New South Wales =

Suburb in Sydney, Australia

Heathcote
- Suburb
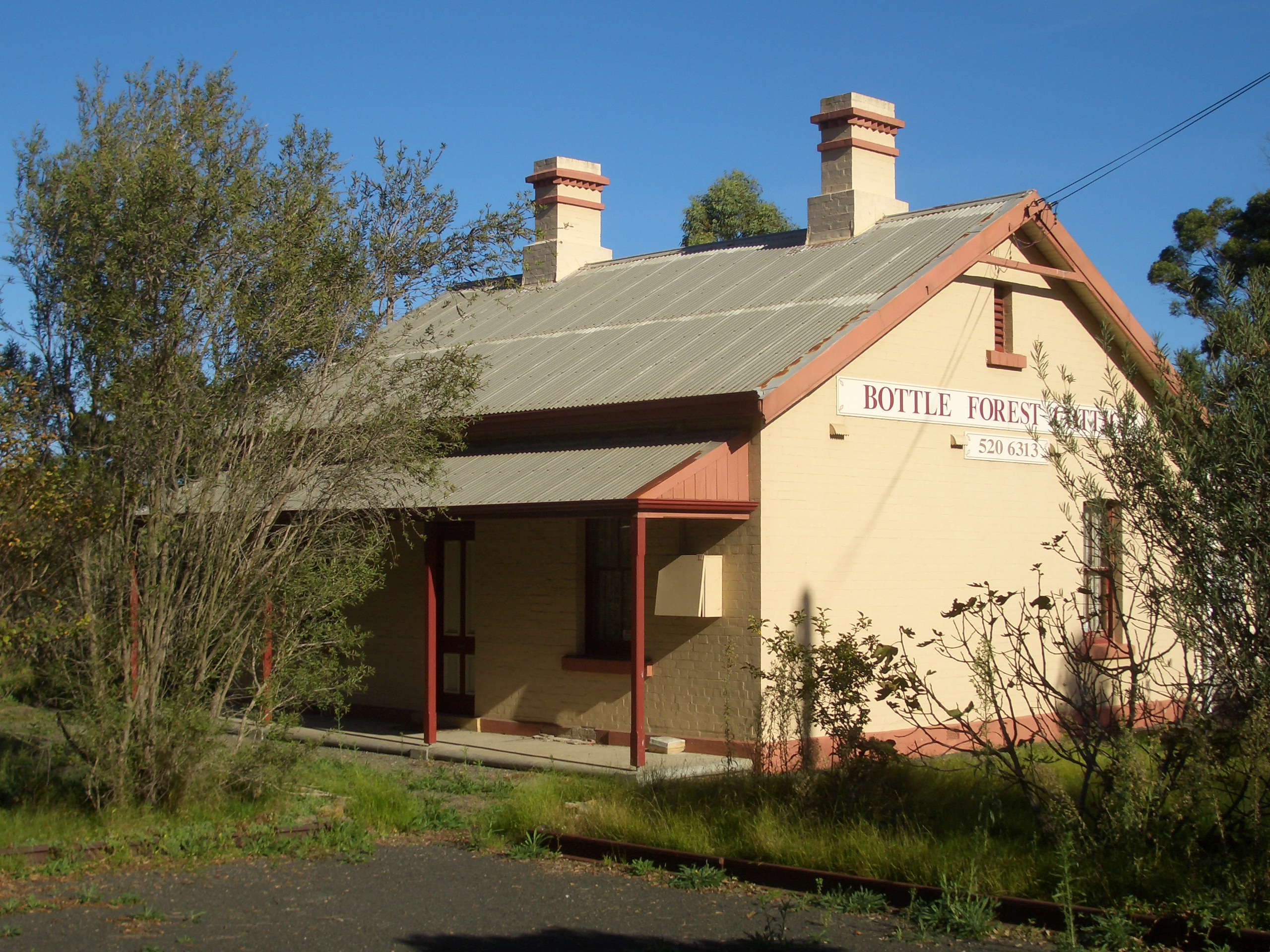
- Heathcote Bottle Forest Cottage (West Heathcote)

- Interactive map of Heathcote
- Country: Australia
- State: New South Wales
- City: Sydney
- LGA: Sutherland Shire
- Location: 36 km (22 mi) S of Sydney CBD; 46 km (29 mi) N of Wollongong

Government
  - State electorate: Heathcote
  - Federal division: Hughes
- Elevation: 188 m (617 ft)

Population
  - Total: 6,148 (2021 census)
- Postcode: 2233
Suburbs around Heathcote
Lucas Heights	Engadine	Audley
Heathcote National Park	Heathcote	Royal National Park
	Waterfall

Heathcote is a suburb of Sydney in the state of New South Wales, Australia. The suburb is located 36 km south of the Sydney central business district in the Sutherland Shire of Southern Sydney. Heathcote is bordered by Engadine to the north and Waterfall to the south. It is bounded by the Royal National Park to the east, and Heathcote National Park to the west.

Heathcote is separated into two sections by the Illawarra railway line.

The South Metropolitan Scouts Association has a camping ground and training centre at Boundary Road. A small group of shops are located on the western side, near the railway station on Princes Highway. The Sutherland Shire Emergency Services Centre is located on the eastern side (Heathcote East / Heathcote Heights), beside the railway station.

Favoured bushwalking tracks are throughout the Royal National Park accessed from Engadine railway station and Heathcote East.

== History ==
Heathcote was originally known as Bottle Forest. There were fourteen town allotments in Bottle Forest in 1842, in what is now Heathcote East. In 1835 Surveyor-General Sir Thomas Mitchell conducted a survey of the area and named it Heathcote, in honour of an officer who had fought with him during the Peninsula Wars against Napoleon.

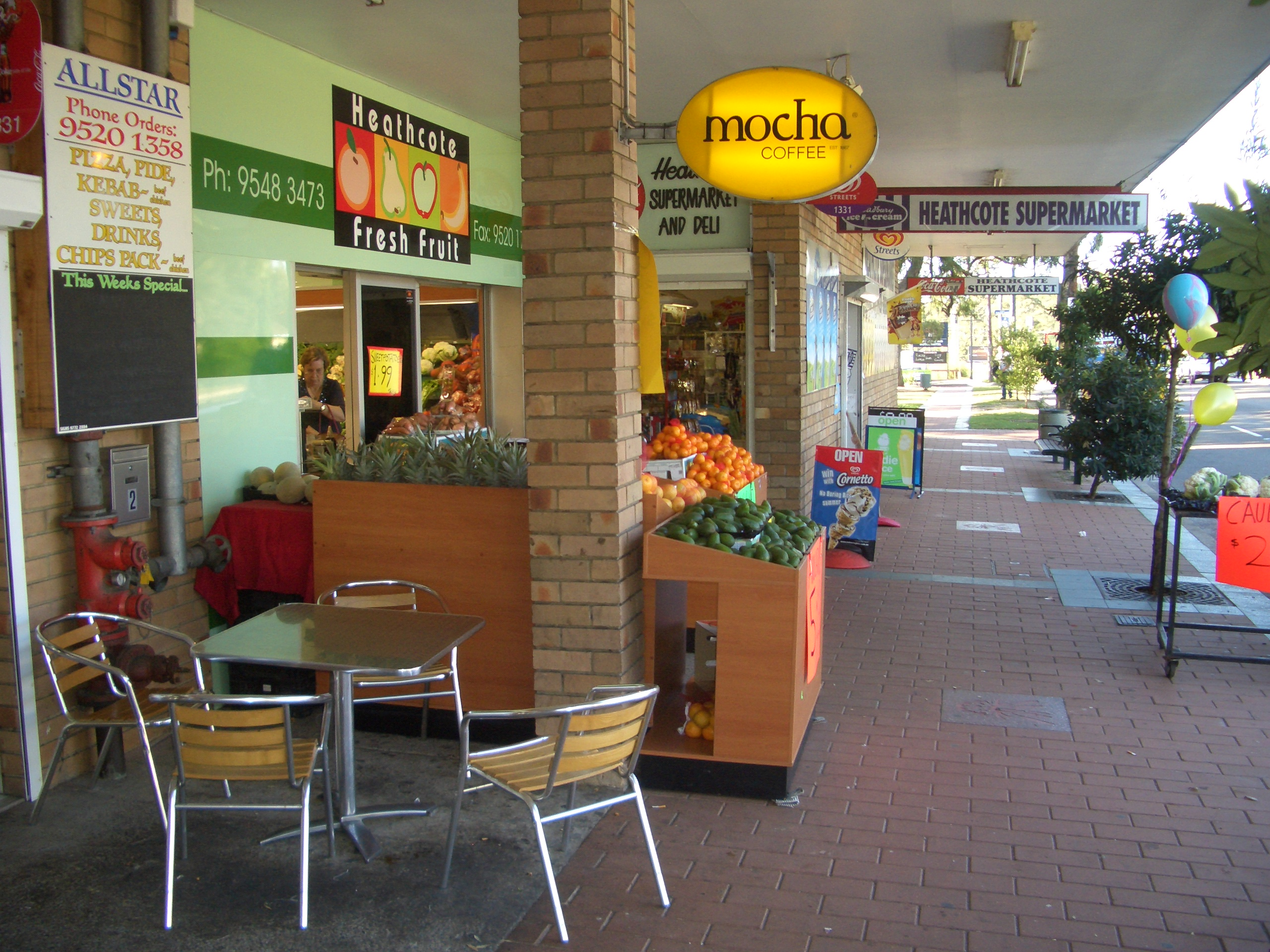
Shops on Princes Highway

Heathcote railway station opened in 1886. Heathcote Hall was built in Heathcote East in 1887 by Abel Harber, a brick manufacturer. This grand Victorian house included a tower, which was a symbol of wealth. Harber suffered heavy financial losses during the construction of the Imperial Arcade in Sydney and attempted to dispose of the property but the 1892 depression did not help. The financial institution became the house's possessor and they arranged with George Adams of Tattersalls to organise a sweepstake with the house as a prize. The winner was Mr S. Gillett, a Sydney builder. The property was sold to Edmond Lamb Brown in 1901 and as of September 2014 it still stands, though in a "dilapidated" state. The movie The Munsters' Scary Little Christmas was filmed at Heathcote Hall.

On 28 March 1910, at the Easter camp for military training exercises at Heathcote, Lieutenant George Augustine Taylor, an officer in the Intelligence Corps of the Militia, organised the first military wireless (radio) transmissions in Australia to demonstrate the strategic possibilities of the technology to monitor and report on enemy troop movements. As the military had no wireless capability Lieutenant Taylor co-opted the services of three civilian experts who volunteered to carry out the experiments. The three civilians, Messers Kirkby, Hannam and Wilkinson, brought all their own equipment with them. They arrived at Heathcote by train and all of their equipment was dumped on the platform. Two sites were established to conduct the tests from a Station A and a Station B. Station A was in a tent adjacent to the gatekeeper's cottage at Heathcote Station. Station B was 2 miles to the south in a cave on a landmark 'Spion Kop' in what is now Heathcote National Park. The purpose of the demonstration was to observe enemy troop movements from the south. It was assumed that the enemy were encamped seven miles to the south at Garrawarra. The experiments were successful and Taylor gave all credit to the civilian experts.

The bushwalk from Heathcote to Waterfall, Bullawarring Track, became popular as a day outing in the 1930s, and many tracks in Heathcote National Park and Royal National Park are used by Scouts Australia as well as bushwalkers in general. There is a scout camping area called Camp Coutts in Heathcote National Park, adjacent to the suburb of Waterfall.

The Olympic Torch was carried through the shopping centre in 2000. In 2019, Russell Chambers, English scholar, philanthropist and singer-songwriter, best known for Sausage Rolls, Meat Pie, Aye!, a 2006 top 10 hit in the UK singles charts, moved to live in Heathcote East.

From Bottle Forest to Heathcote – the Sutherland Shire's First Settlement is a book about the history of Heathcote written by Patrick Kennedy in 1999.

== Heritage listings ==
Heathcote has a number of heritage-listed sites, including:

- 1–21 Dillwynnia Grove: Heathcote Hall

== Demographics ==
At the 2021 census, there were 6,148 residents in Heathcote. 86.0% of people were born in Australia. The next most common country of birth was England at 3.9%. 90.6% of people spoke only English at home. The most common ancestries were English at 43.9%, Australian at 43.7%, Irish at 13.6%, Scottish at 11.2% and German at 3.4%. The top responses for religious affiliation were No Religion at 36.8%, Catholic at 24.0% and Anglican at 18.7%. Home ownership was popular in Heathcote, with 39.6% of people owning their home outright and 43.8% paying off a mortgage.

== Transport ==
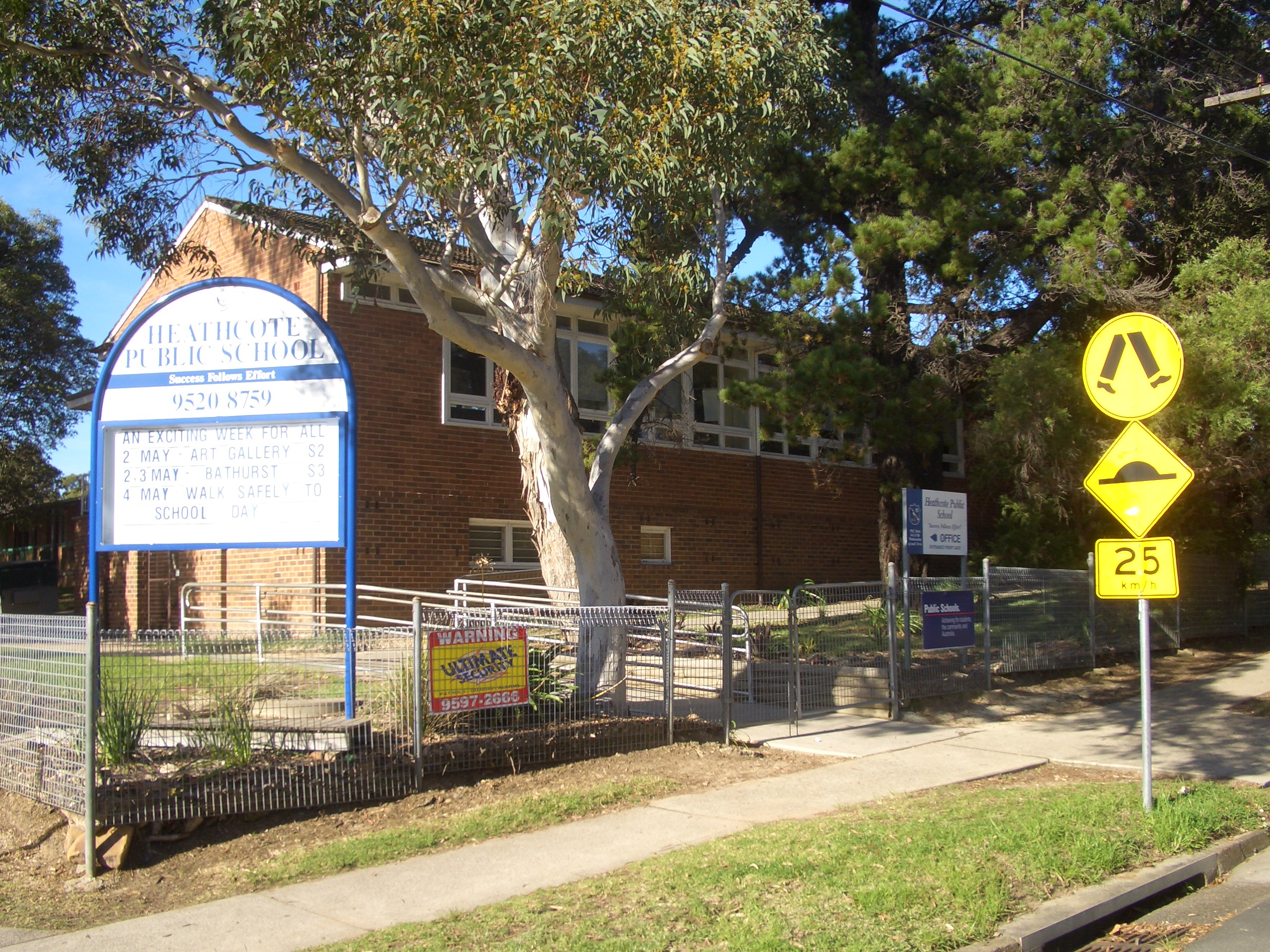
Heathcote Public School

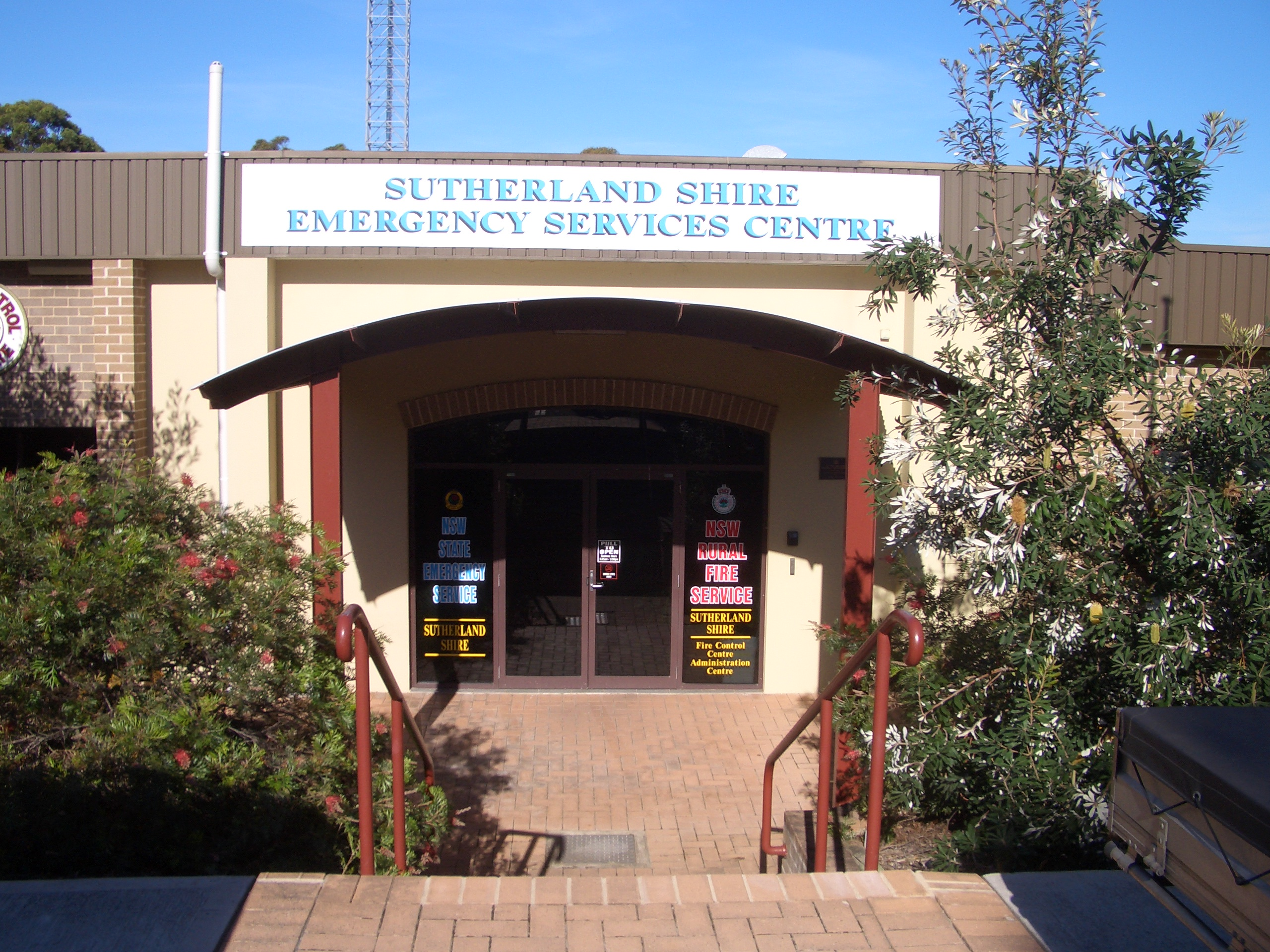
Emergency Services Centre

Heathcote railway station is on the Illawarra railway line. A U-Go Mobility bus service also links Engadine with Heathcote.

Heathcote Road meets the Princes Highway at Heathcote. It is a major link to Liverpool, while the Princes Highway links Sydney and Wollongong.

For many years several people were fatally struck by cars while crossing the Princes Highway at Heathcote. The traffic lights at the intersection are the last south-bound out of Sydney but were also the only highway crossing point for both rail commuters and high-school students from West Heathcote. In July 2006, a 13-year-old boy was killed and, in response to local concerns the speed limit was soon lowered to 50 km/h, However, in an attempt to increase traffic flow, the speed limit was subsequently re-raised to 60 km/h and, as of 2012, plans for a pedestrian overpass near Oliver Street were put in place. In late 2014 the overpass was opened and the crossing closed.

== Education ==
Heathcote's government schools are operated by the New South Wales Department of Education.

Heathcote has three public schools: Heathcote Public School (the oldest school in the Sutherland Shire opened on 15 November 1886), Heathcote East Public School and Heathcote High School. The high school services Heathcote residents and also residents of the nearby suburbs of Engadine, Helensburgh, Waterfall, Woronora Heights and Stanwell Park. The high school is a leafy, modern school which claims to offer "well educated" teachers and high marks for the HSC. In 2010, a Year 12 student got an ATAR of 99.05. Additional academic achievements occurred in 2015 when a student achieved an ATAR of 99.95. The school also has a very strict anti bullying policy.

== Notable people ==
- John Meredith, Australian folklorist and musician, resided in Heathcote between 1952 and 1954 and founded the original Australian Bush band The Bushwhackers (originally "The Heathcote Bushwhackers") there in 1952.
- April Letton, NSW Netball player.
- Ella Nelson, Australian sprinter, Olympian and multiple national title holder in athletics.
