= Imperial Arcade =

Imperial Arcade, Sydney

General information
- Type: Arcade
- Architectural style: Second Empire
- Location: 168 Pitt Street, Sydney, New South Wales, Australia, Australia
- Coordinates: 33°52′12″S 151°12′32″E
- Construction started: 1889
- Completed: 1891
- Opened: 16 July 1891

Height
- Height: 114 feet (34.7 m)

Technical details
- Floor count: 7 levels

Design and construction
- Architect: Thomas Rowe

The Imperial Arcade was a commercial building in Sydney, Australia, designed by prominent Sydney architect Thomas Rowe opened in 1891 on the site now occupied by Westfield Sydney.

== History ==
=== Planning and construction ===
Development of the Imperial Arcade was a business venture by the newly formed Imperial Arcade Company Ltd to "construct an arcade in the centre of Sydney, from Pitt Street to Castlereagh Street, on a scale hitherto not attempted in any part of Australia". Capital was fixed at £80,000, with 40,000 shares of £2 each, 17,000 of which were offered to the public through a prospectus issued in March 1889. A return of 14-percent was forecast.

The company's board consisted of six directors: WM Beaumont Esq, chairman George C. Chalmers (of Roberts, Chalmers and Co), Joseph Thomas Burton-Gibbs (of Gibbs, Shallard and Co), JR Linsley, Esq., M.L.A, George Merriman, Esq. (City Solicitor), and Hon. Bruce Smith MLA. Other people involved include George Withers and Callaghan.

The designated site consisted of one freehold property fronting Castlereagh Street and an adjoining leasehold (21-year) property fronting Pitt Street, both acquired for a total of £25,000.

A design competition was held between several architecture firms, with prominent Sydney architect Thomas Rowe securing the £350 contract.

=== Opening and early use ===
The Imperial Arcade was opened on 16 July 1891 by the then Mayor of Sydney, William Patrick Manning.

The first hotel in the building was the Imperial Arcade Hotel. While an initial application for a licence had been rejected, a second application by manager Philip Husk was granted on 12 April 1892, despite much opposition. The recent closure of nearby Gompagnoni banquet rooms was cited as a reason for granting the new application. The single license covered both the Pitt St and Castlereagh St lots. The suspicious death of manager Philip Husk two years later, first thought to be business-related, was later ruled to be suicide.

In April 1895, rates at the Imperial Arcade Hotel were 15 shillings per week for a single room, or 30 shillings per week for a double. The dining rooms provided a seven course lunch for 2 shillings, the "best served luncheon in the city".

In 1902, a case was brought against Smith for the sale of alcohol on unlicensed premises – the Castelreagh Street bar of the Imperial Arcade Hotel (at 83 Castlereagh Street). Details of the licensed area, however, approved in the original 1892 application, had been "lost" by the court and therefore the case was dismissed on 9 May 1902.

=== First sale ===
In June 1897, James Joynton Smith retired after five years as managing director and licensee of the Grand Central Coffee Palace, in the Imperial Arcade. His replacement in the role was Mr Sloye.

"At the beginning of the [20th] century" Smith acquired the lease for the Arcadia Hotel with an option to purchase, which he executed some years later when the estate was in liquidation. While a condition of the purchase was a cash deposit of £5,000, Smith offered £2,000 in cash and £3,000 in promissory notes, convincing the liquidators that the debt would extend their employment, and so the sale was agreed. Smith took out a loan for £28,000 from AMP to finalise the sale.

Smith began renovating the Arcadia Hotel "piecemeal"

In 1919, Smith established a new Sydney journal, Smith's Weekly, employing R.C. Packer (founder of Australia's Packer media dynasty) and Claude McKay as co-editors. The first issue was launched on 1 March 1919, with 100,000 copies printed in the basement of the Imperial Arcade.

It was reported that the arcade itself was "a white elephant for the businessman long after it was redecorated in 1897". Smith "let shops for practically nothing just to fill the Arcade" while the "bar trade was meagre".

=== 1924 auction ===
On 2 October 1924, Smith attended the auction for the remaining western (Pitt Street) portion of the Imperial Arcade. One story describes how two of Smith's adversaries, Emanuel Myerson and T. E. Rofe, outbid Smith at £113,000, at which point Smith left the auction room. Theo Marks, on behalf of Smith and the newly formed City Freeholds Ltd, then placed the final and winning bid of £115,000, thus completing Smith's ownership of the entire Imperial Arcade premises between Pitt and Castlereagh Streets.

Shortly after, on 5 December 1924, the first Woolworths store was opened in the arcade basement, alongside a billiard saloon and the printing works of "Smith's Weekly".

It wasn't until the opening of the David Jones Castelreagh Street store, on 28 November 1927, that "shoppers began to pour through ... and the Imperial began to boom". Smith had rejected offers from David Jones on the Imperial Arcade, and secured the right to go below Castlereagh Street into David Jones from Sydney City council. Smith "built up a fortune from the Arcadia Hotel".

By 1927, Smith had the arcade listed under various company names including The Joyton Smith Management Trust, and City Freeholds Ltd, both managed by Otto Camphin.

Reports suggest Smith was a ruthless landlord, one describing him as "a man so utterly the antithesis of that landed knight", another as a "wrack-rent landlord".

In August 1936 Smith was reportedly in negotiations with the Myer Group to sell the property for a tentative price of £600,000. This sale never eventuated.

Trustees of the Joynton Smith Management Trust included managing-director William Patrick (Bill) Donohoe who was "actively concerned in the management" of the hotel.

=== 1941 sale ===
In November 1941, shareholders of City Freeholds Ltd approved a contract of sale (dated October 24, 1941) for the Imperial Arcade, Arcadia Hotel, and adjoining property 'Durno's' at 176 Pitt Street valued in the company's June 30 accounts at £360,987. The purchase was made by a private company, Weathermakers Pty Ltd, for a reported £500,000.

Sydney's Truth newspaper reported a "deep mystery" surrounding the "colossal deal". considering that Weathermakers Pty Ltd had no issued paid up capital, and only seven shareholders. This led to speculation that a wealthy Sydney company, Burns Philp and Co. Ltd, proprietors of the prosperous Penney's chain, were also involved in the purchase. Although the company's general manager, Lewis Armstrong, neither confirmed or denied the rumour, it was later proven to be true. The final sale price of £558,000 was also confirmed. Other accounts of the sale appear to have misreported the sale price as £1,000,000.

=== Demolition and redevelopment ===
At the time of the 1941 sale of the Imperial Arcade, Sydney's Truth newspaper reported that "any great structural changes in the property would appear to be precluded by the National Security Regulations controlling expenditure of building construction work." The same article, however, also speculated that "this section of busy Pitt Street may some day see a development which will entirely alter its landscape".

In 1960, reports first emerged of plans to demolish the Imperial Arcade and replace it with a 36-storey, £4,000,000 mixed-use office block.

The building was demolished in 1961.

The new Imperial Arcade was developed on the site by property developers Stocks and Holdings Ltd (now Stockland), the company's first Sydney city centre redevelopment project. It was opened on 18 October 1965 by the then NSW Premier, Robert Askin. It consisted of four shopping levels, with office space above.

In 2004, the new Imperial Arcade building was purchased for $90 million by Westfield and amalgamated with 3 other properties (Centrepoint, Sydney Central Plaza, and Skygarden) to form Westfield Sydney, which remains on the site today.

== Architecture ==
The Imperial Arcade building was designed by Thomas Rowe, his third after the Sydney Arcade and the Royal Arcade, in the Second Empire style, based on 17th-century French Renaissance architecture. It was constructed over a two-year period from 1889 to 1891. The 333-foot long arcade formed a thoroughfare from Pitt St to Castlereagh St.

The building's footprint spanned two properties. One fronting Castlereagh Street, of size 64-feet, 5-inches x 161 feet (964 sqm), and a second fronting Pitt Street, of size 67 x 163 feet (1015 sqm). to give a combined footprint of 1,979 sqm.

The building consisted of seven floors (including the basement) with a combined height of 114 feet (34.75 metres) measured from the basement floor to the ridge of the roof.

The floorplan intended for cafes in the basement, 38 shops on the ground floor, and hotel space on the upper floors. The original floorplan was divided into two distinct properties, with a 36-room "Pitt Street Hotel" and a 39-room "Castlereagh Street Hotel".

Notable features included "V-shaped areas in side walls" to promote light and ventilation.

The Building's original colour scheme of white and grey, deemed too "cold and uninviting", was redecorated in 1897 under the direction of architect Herbert S. Thompson, in "cream and green, with gay touches of salmon, gold, crimson and cinnamon".
