= Woronora Heights =

- Suburb
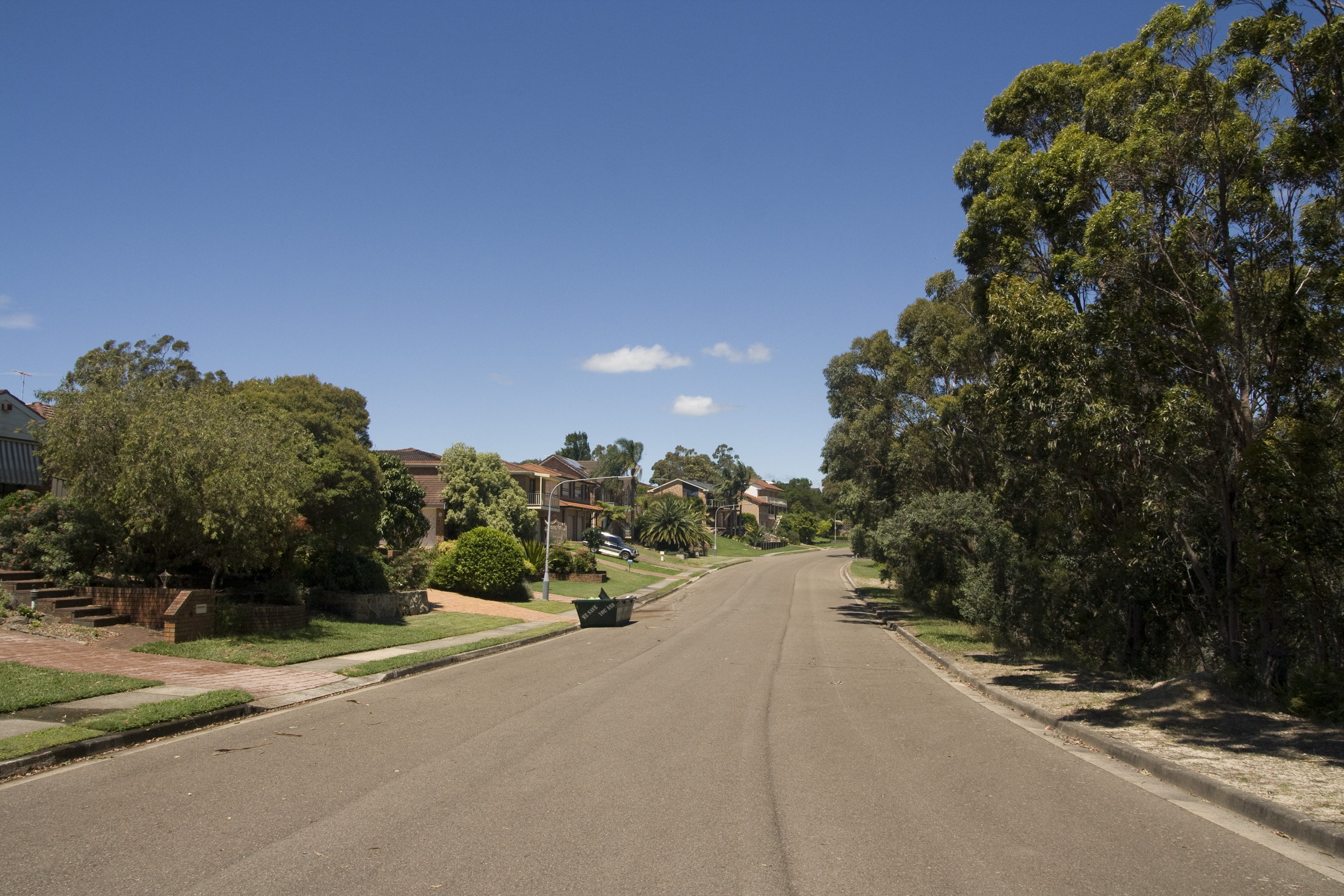
- Warrangaree Drive

- Interactive map of Woronora Heights
- Country: Australia
- State: New South Wales
- City: Sydney
- LGA: Sutherland Shire
- Location: 29 km (18 mi) from Sydney CBD

Government
  - State electorate: Heathcote
  - Federal division: Hughes
- Elevation: 120 m (390 ft)

Population
  - Total: 2,781 (2021 census)
- Postcode: 2233
Suburbs around Woronora Heights
Barden Ridge	Bangor	Bonnet Bay
Lucas Heights	Woronora Heights	Woronora
Engadine	Yarrawarrah	Loftus

Woronora Heights is a suburb in southern Sydney, in the state of New South Wales, Australia. Woronora Heights is located 29 kilometres south of the Sydney central business district, in the local government area of the Sutherland Shire. Woronora is a separate suburb, to the north. Most streets in Woronora Heights are named after birds.

== History ==
Woronora is derived from an Aboriginal word wooloonora, meaning 'black rock'. It is believed to have been named by Surveyor Dixon in 1828.

== Landmarks ==
Woronora Heights is bounded by the Woronora River in the west, the top of the escarpment in the north and the Metropolitan Water Sewerage and Drainage Board pipeline in the east and south. The Woronora Reservoir is one of the sources of Sydney's water supply.

The Woronora Plateau, is a geographical region adjacent to the Sydney Plain. Slightly higher in altitude, it is capped with Hawkesbury Sandstone. It is often hotter in summer and colder in winter than Sydney. The Woronora River flows through the deeply dissected plateau to the Georges River from near the sources of the Port Hacking, within the Sutherland Shire.

== Fire trail protests ==
There have been various protests organised relating to proposals to open the fire trail linking Woronora Heights to the Woronora Valley to the north to through traffic. In 2006 a proposal to open the fire trail for bus access was reviewed by an Independent Hearing and Assessment Panel organised by Sutherland Shire Council. After reviewing submissions from resident groups supporting and opposing the proposal, the Panel agreed unanimously that opening the fire trail to buses is not in the public interest. In the same week, the State Government declared the fire trail area "environmentally protected", making opening the fire trail to buses or other through traffic a prohibited development.

In July 2014, Sutherland Shire Council confirmed that the fire trail would remain closed to through traffic (except when emergency access is required). This was a unanimous vote by all 15 councillors. However, not all residents agreed.

== Sport ==
Woronora Heights is home to Bosco FC, who play at Woronora Heights Oval.

== Transport ==
U-Go Mobility operates bus route 993 to Engadine and Westfield Miranda.
