= Waterfall railway station, Sydney =

Railway station in Sydney, New South Wales, Australia

Waterfall
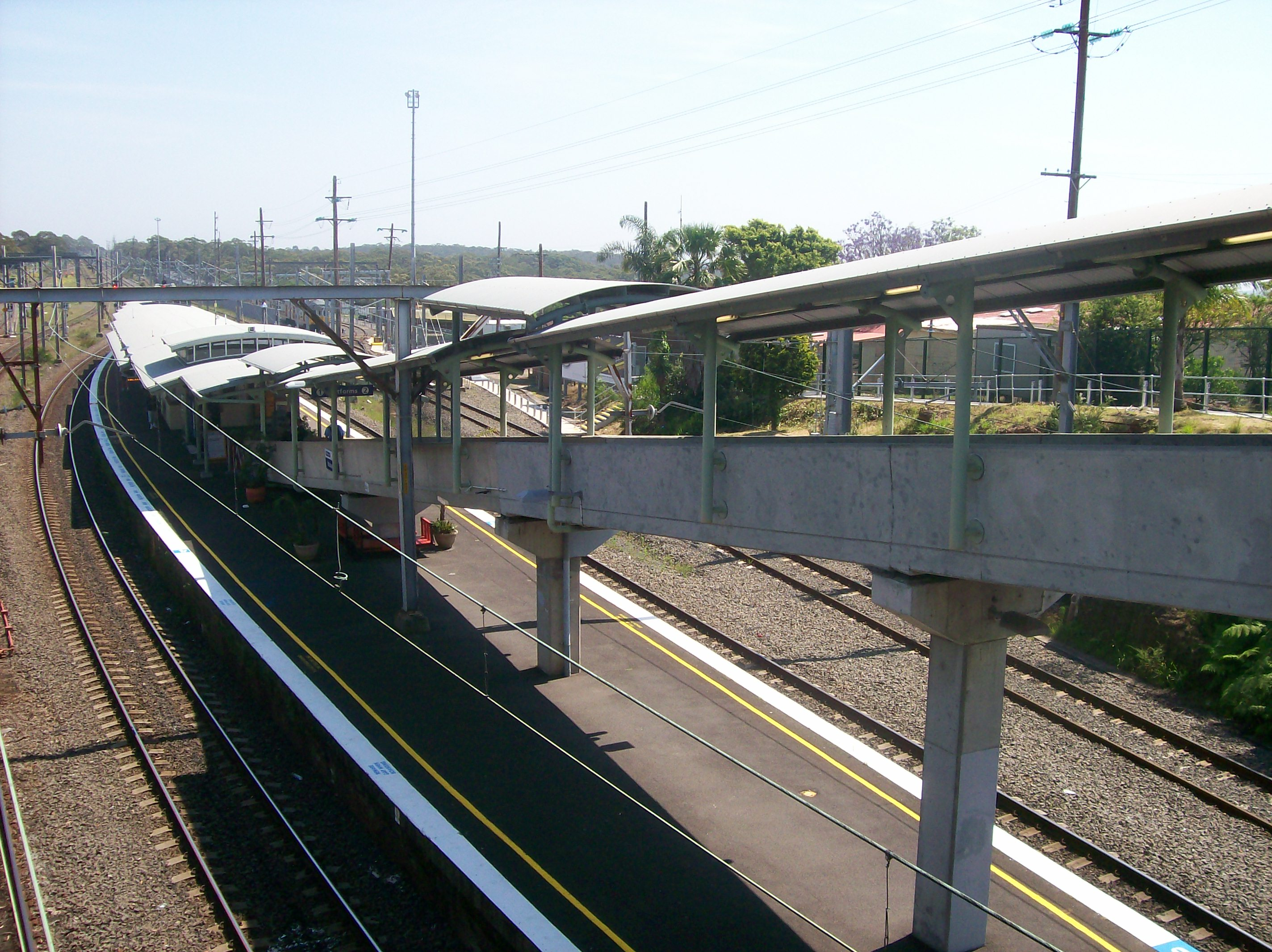
- Northbound view of the station platforms and entrance ramp in November 2011

General information
- Location: Kooraban Street, Waterfall; Sydney, New South Wales; Australia
- Coordinates: 34°08′04″S 150°59′40″E
- Elevation: 228 metres (748 ft)
- Owner: Transport Asset Manager of NSW
- Operator: Sydney Trains
- Line: South Coast
- Distance: 38.74 km (24.07 mi) from Central
- Platforms: 2 (1 island)
- Tracks: 4

Construction
- Structure type: Ground
- Accessible: Yes

Other information
- Status: Staffed
- Station code: WFL
- Website: Transport for NSW

History
- Opened: 9 March 1886 (140 years ago)
- Rebuilt: 4 May 1905 (121 years ago)
- Electrified: Yes (from July 1980)
- Former names: Waterfalls (1886)

Passengers
- 2023: 201,620 (year); 552 (daily) (Sydney Trains, NSW TrainLink)

Services
Preceding station	Sydney Trains	Following station
Terminus	Eastern Suburbs & Illawarra Line	Heathcote towards Bondi Junction
Preceding station	Intercity Trains	Following station
Helensburgh towards Kiama or Port Kembla	South Coast Line	Heathcote Limited weekday morning peak services towards Central or Bondi Junction
Helensburgh towards Kiama	South Coast Line	Sutherland towards Central or Bondi Junction
Location

Waterfall railway station is a suburban railway station located on the South Coast line, serving the Sydney suburb of Waterfall. It is served by Sydney Trains T4 Eastern Suburbs & Illawarra Line services and intercity South Coast Line services.

== History ==
The station opened on 9 March 1886 as Waterfalls, being renamed later in the year. It served as the terminus of the South Coast railway line, until the line was extended to Scarborough in 1887. When the line was duplicated from Hurstville on 12 December 1890, the station was relocated northwards. In 1897 a locomotive depot opened.

On 4 May 1905 the station was relocated 600 metres north to its present location.

On 20 December 1994, a shunting accident involving two empty S sets saw one train jack-knife onto the platform, demolishing the concrete pedestrian bridge in the 1994 Waterfall rail accident.

The original weatherboard building was demolished in 1995 and replaced by a rendered brick building.

South of Waterfall station is the site of the Waterfall train disaster, a rail accident resulting in the deaths of the driver and six passengers on 31 January 2003.

Work commenced in late 2013 to make the station fully wheelchair accessible.

=== Sidings ===
Waterfall has sidings for staging freight trains in either direction and a bypass track for goods trains on either side of the platforms. There are also three sidings for the stabling of suburban electric trains to the east of the station. If both platforms at Waterfall station are occupied, then trains that do not stop at Waterfall will also pass by on the bypass tracks.

== Services ==
=== Platforms ===
Platform	Line	Stopping pattern	Notes
1	T4	terminating services to & from Bondi Junction	
1	SCO	services to Sydney Central, Bondi Junction & Port Kembla	
2	T4	terminating services to & from Bondi Junction	
2	SCO	services to Port Kembla & Kiama	

== Trackplan ==
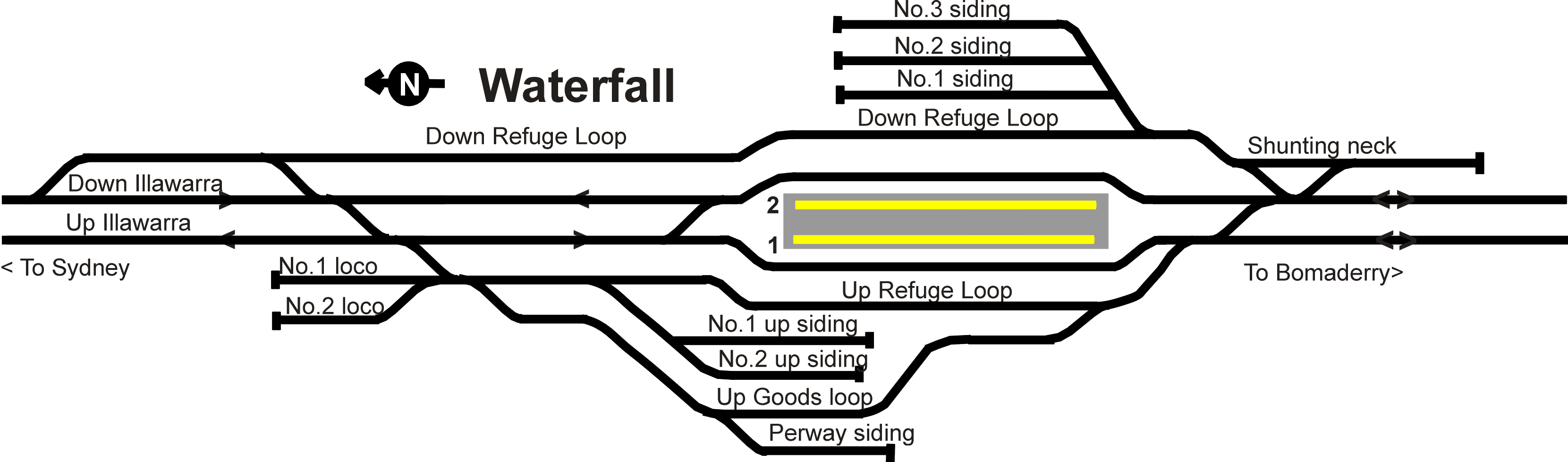
Track layout
