= Wollongong =

Wollongong Woolyungah
- City
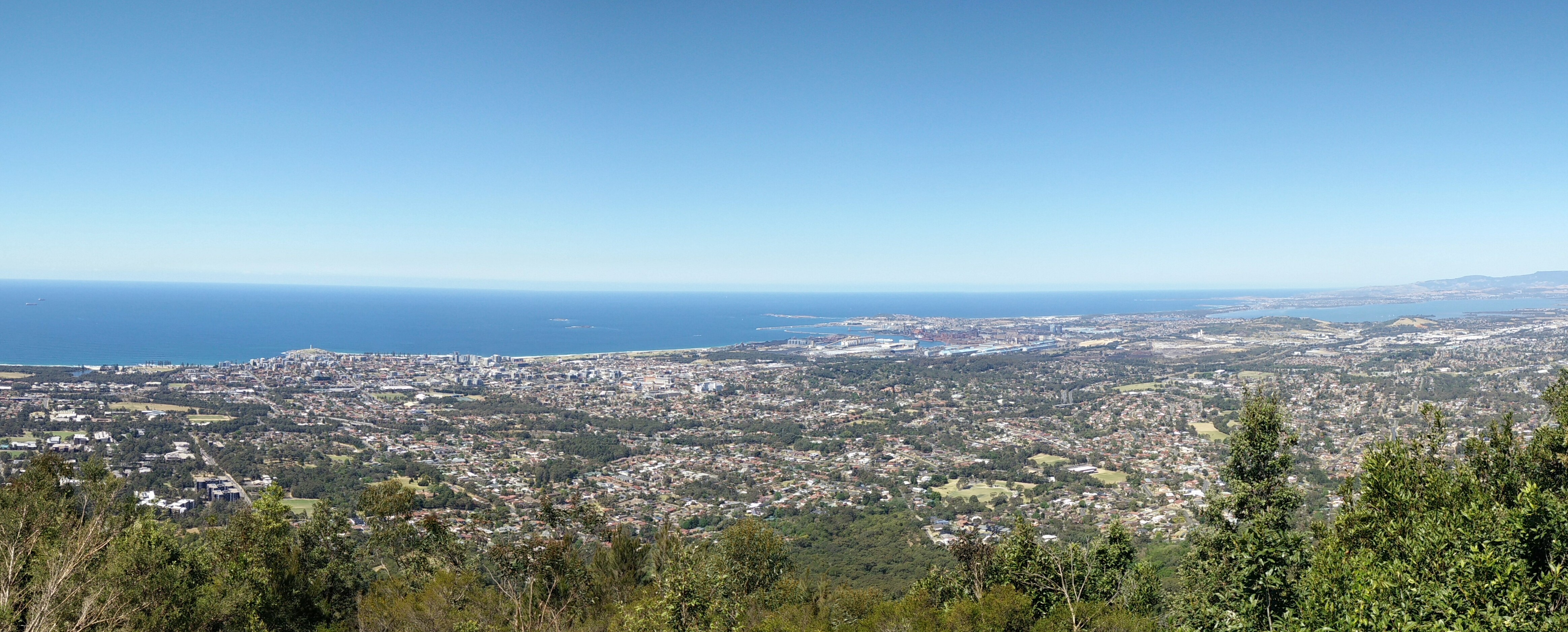
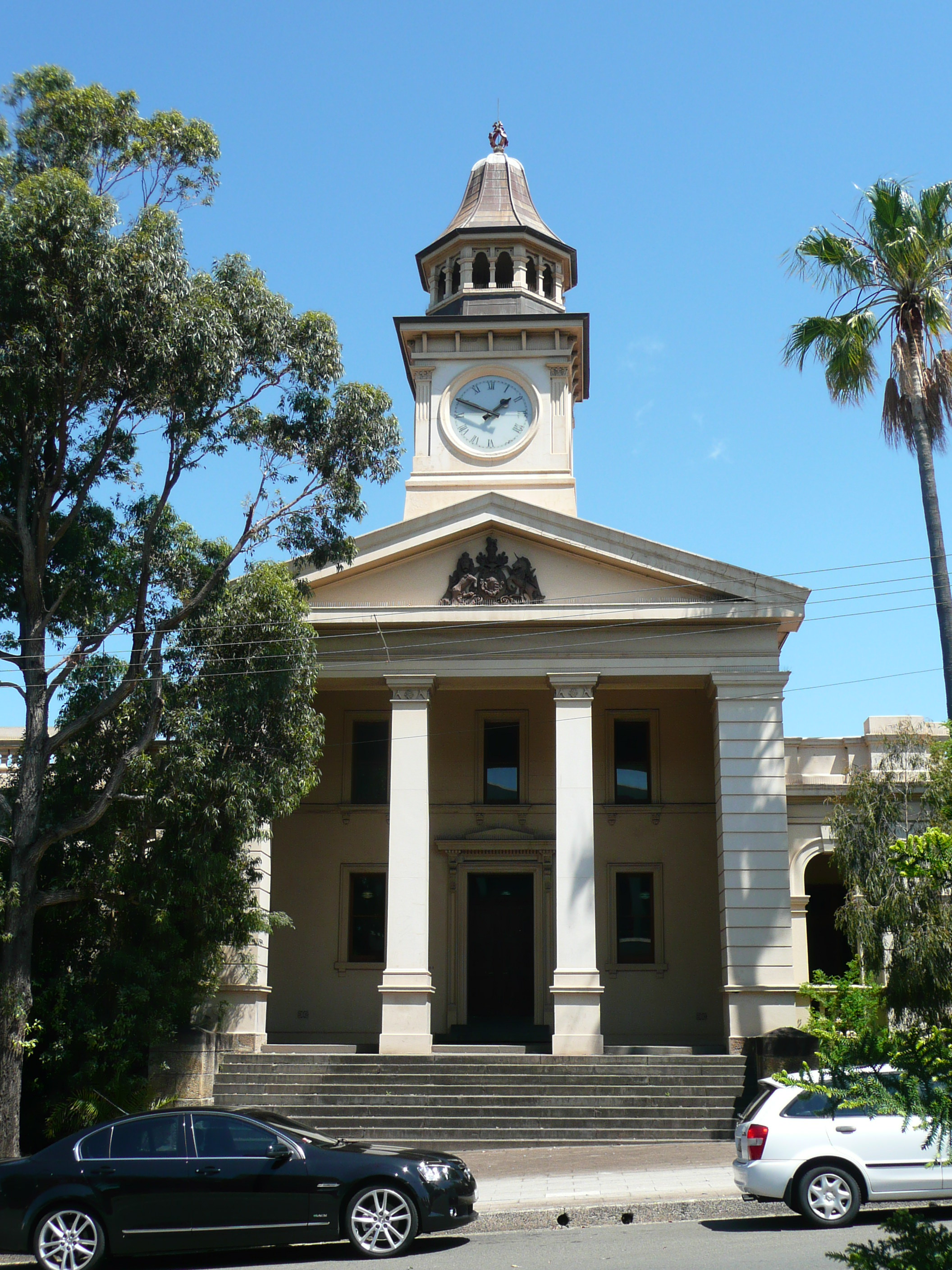
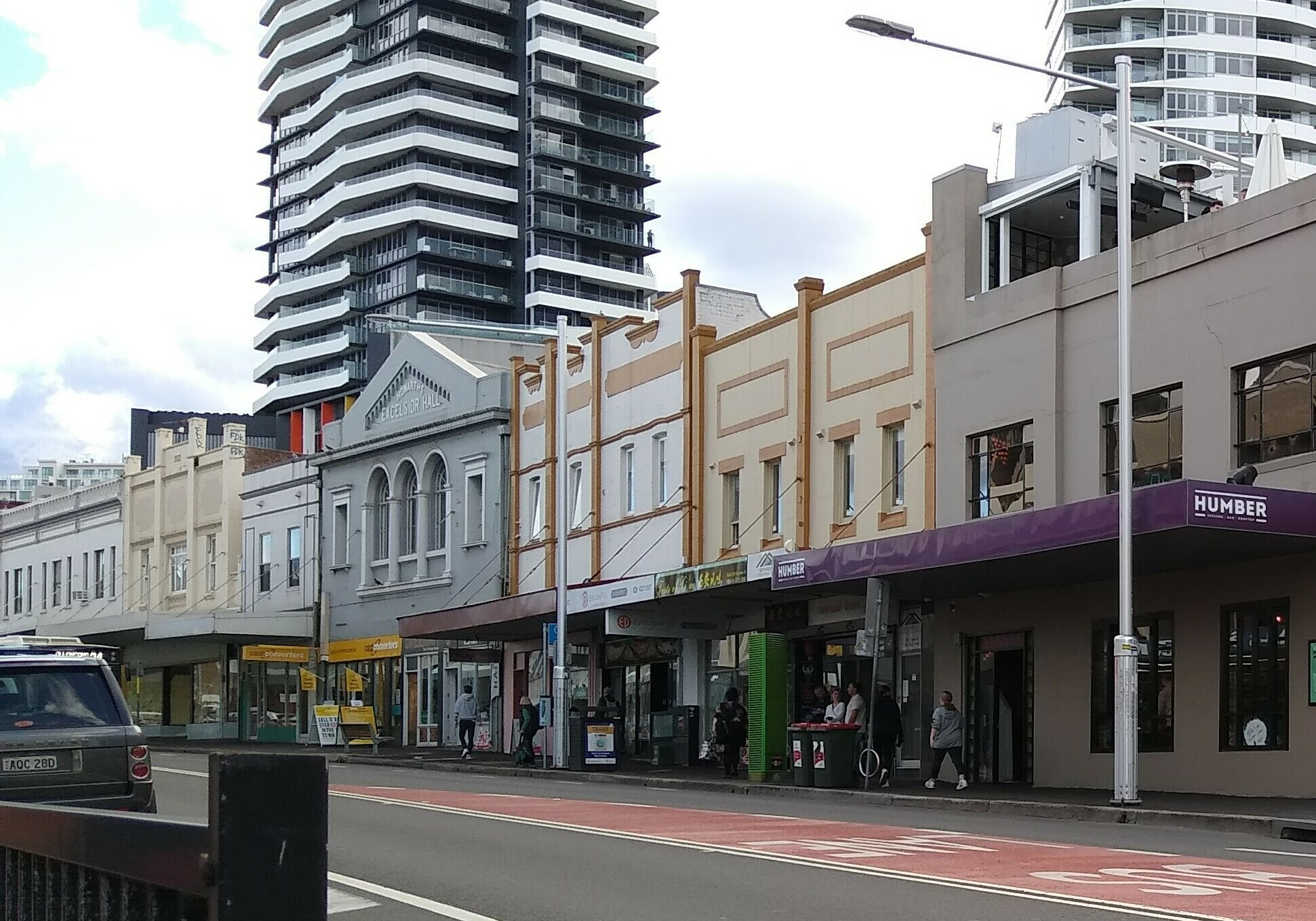
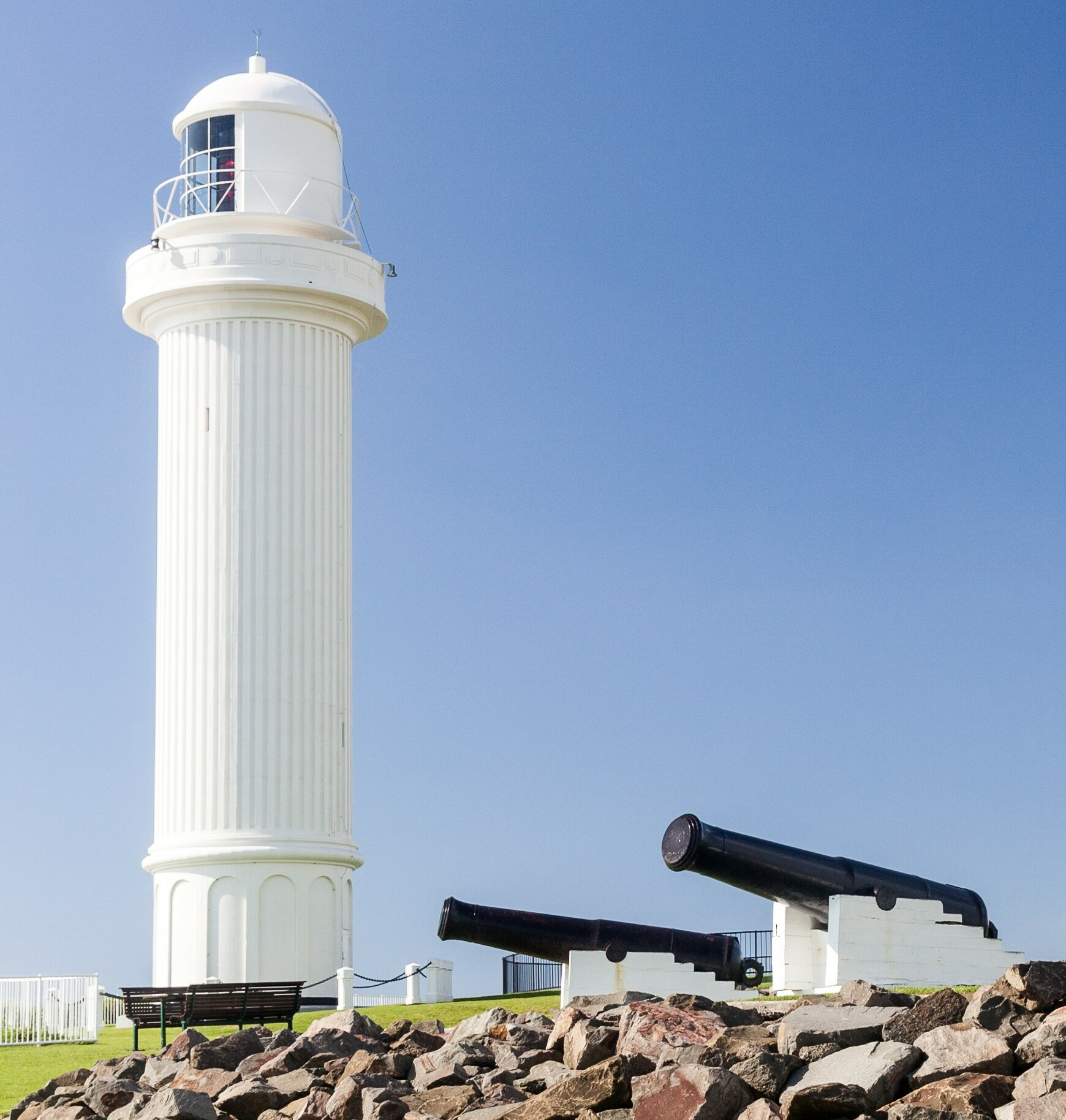
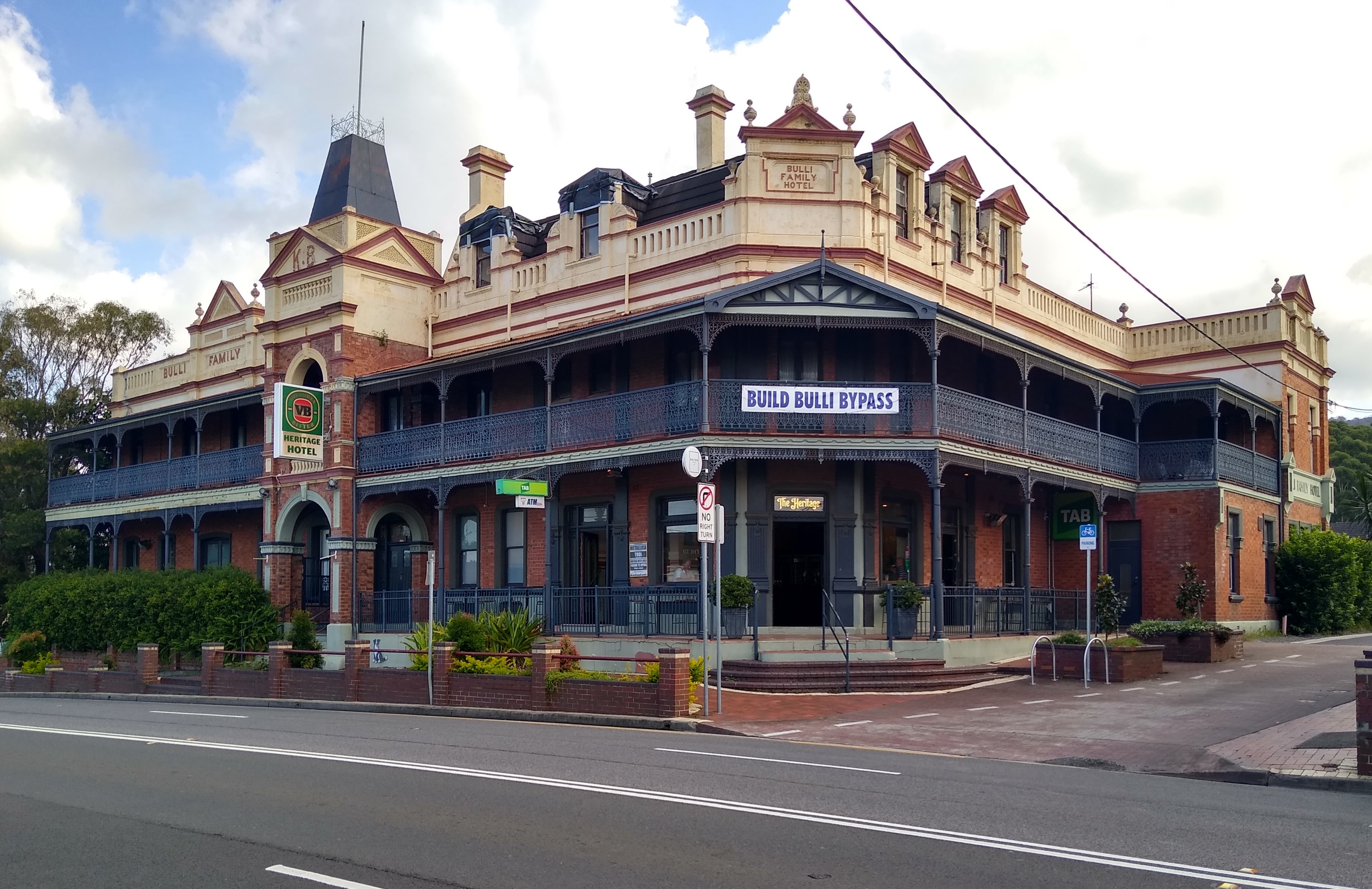
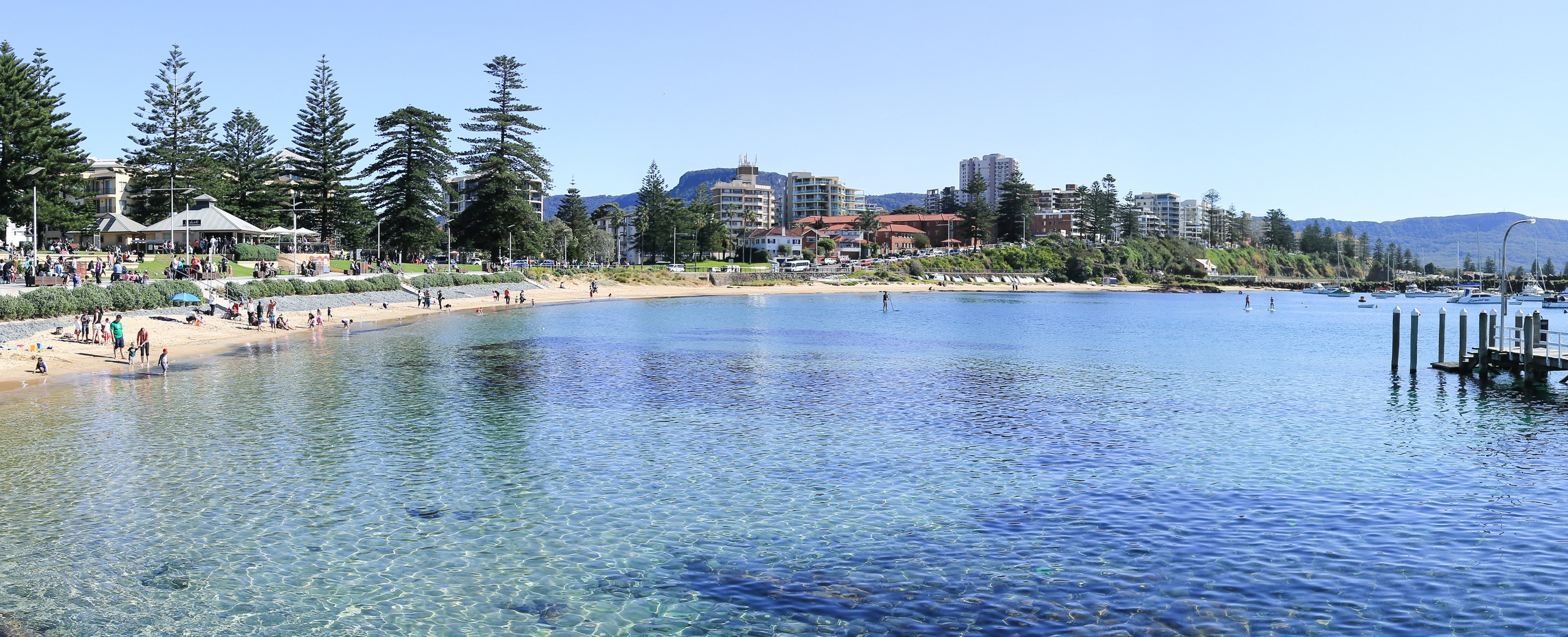
- Wollongong and surrounds Court House Crown Street Flagstaff Hill Lighthouse Heritage Hotel Wollongong Harbour, Brighton Beach

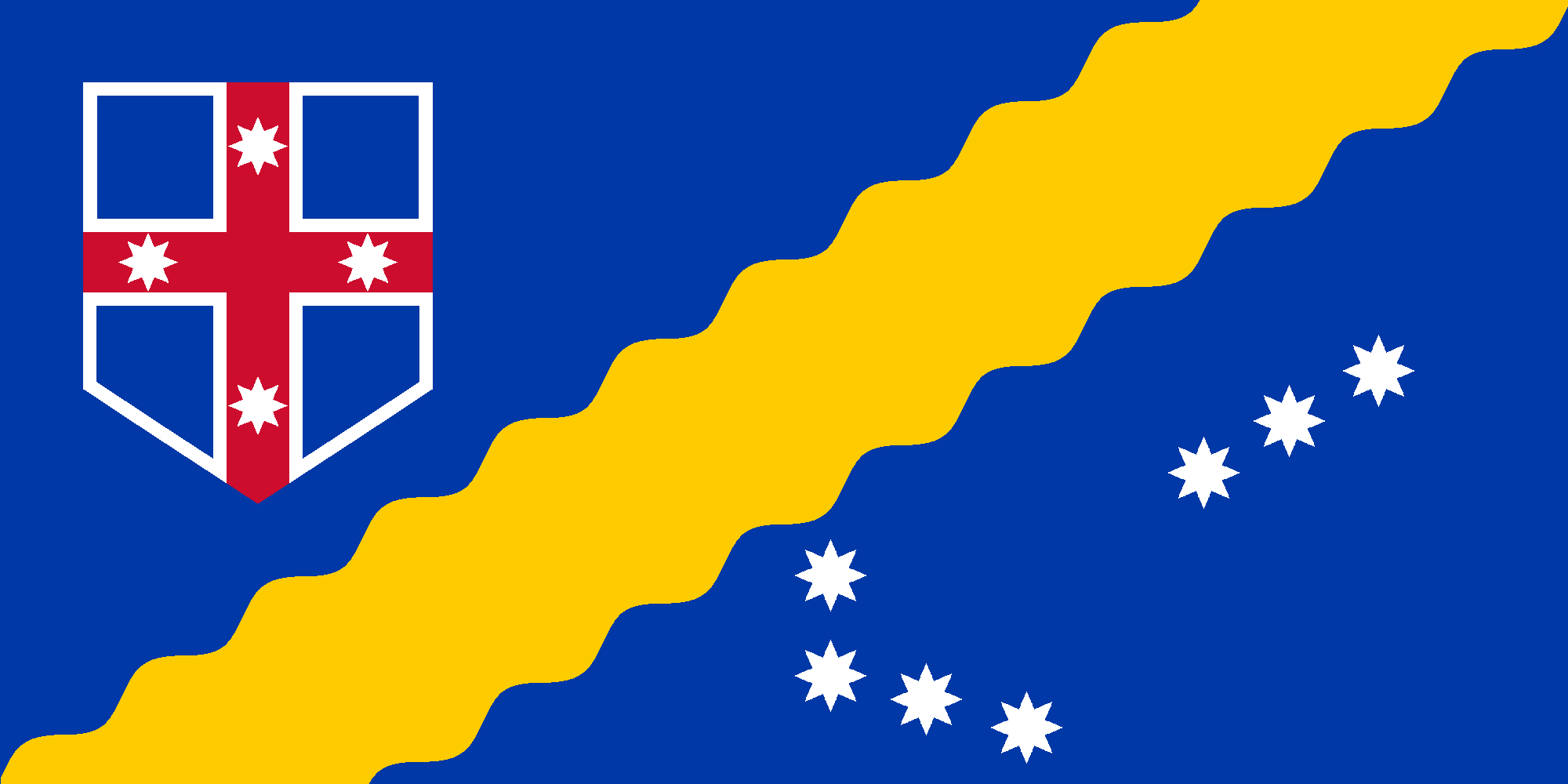
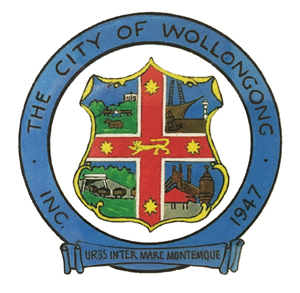
- Flag Coat of arms

- Coordinates: 34°25′38″S 150°53′38″E
- Country: Australia
- State: New South Wales
- Region: Illawarra
- LGAs: City of Wollongong; City of Shellharbour; Municipality of Kiama
- Location: 85 km (53 mi) S of Sydney; 40 km (25 mi) N of Kiama; 73 km (45 mi) E of Bowral; 72 km (45 mi) NE of Nowra; 244 km (152 mi) ENE of Canberra

Government
  - State electorates: Heathcote; Keira; Kiama; Shellharbour; Wollongong
  - Federal division: Cunningham

Area
  - Total: 572.2 km^{2} (220.9 sq mi)
- Elevation: 5 m (16 ft)

Population
  - Total: 280,153 (UCL 2021)
- Time zone: UTC+10 (AEST)
  - Summer (DST): UTC+11 (AEDT)
- Postcode: 2500
- Mean max temp: 21.8 °C (71.2 °F)
- Mean min temp: 13.3 °C (55.9 °F)
- Annual rainfall: 1,320.9 mm (52.00 in)
Localities around Wollongong
Gwynneville	North Wollongong	Pacific Ocean
Mangerton	Wollongong	Pacific Ocean
Mount Saint Thomas	Coniston	Pacific Ocean

Wollongong (/ˈwʊlənɡɒŋ/ WUUL-ən-gong; Dharawal: Woolyungah) is a city in the Illawarra region of New South Wales, Australia. It lies on the narrow coastal strip between the Illawarra Escarpment and the Pacific Ocean, 85 kilometres (53 miles) south of Sydney. Wollongong had an estimated urban population of 302,739 at June 2018, making it the third-largest city in New South Wales after Sydney and Newcastle and the tenth-largest city in Australia by population. The city's current Lord Mayor is Tania Brown who was elected in 2024.

The Wollongong area extends from Helensburgh in the north to Windang and Yallah in the south. Geologically, the city is in the south-eastern part of the Sydney basin, which extends from Newcastle to Nowra.

Wollongong is noted for its heavy industry, its port activity and the quality of its physical setting, occupying a narrow coastal plain between an almost continuous chain of surf beaches and the cliffline of the rainforest-covered Illawarra escarpment. It has two cathedrals, churches of many denominations and the Nan Tien Temple. Wollongong has a very long history of coal mining and industry. The city attracts many tourists each year and is a regional centre for the South Coast fishing industry. A university town, it is home to the University of Wollongong.

== Etymology ==
The name is believed to originate from the Dharawal language, meaning either 'five islands/clouds', 'ground near water' or 'sound of the sea'.

== History ==
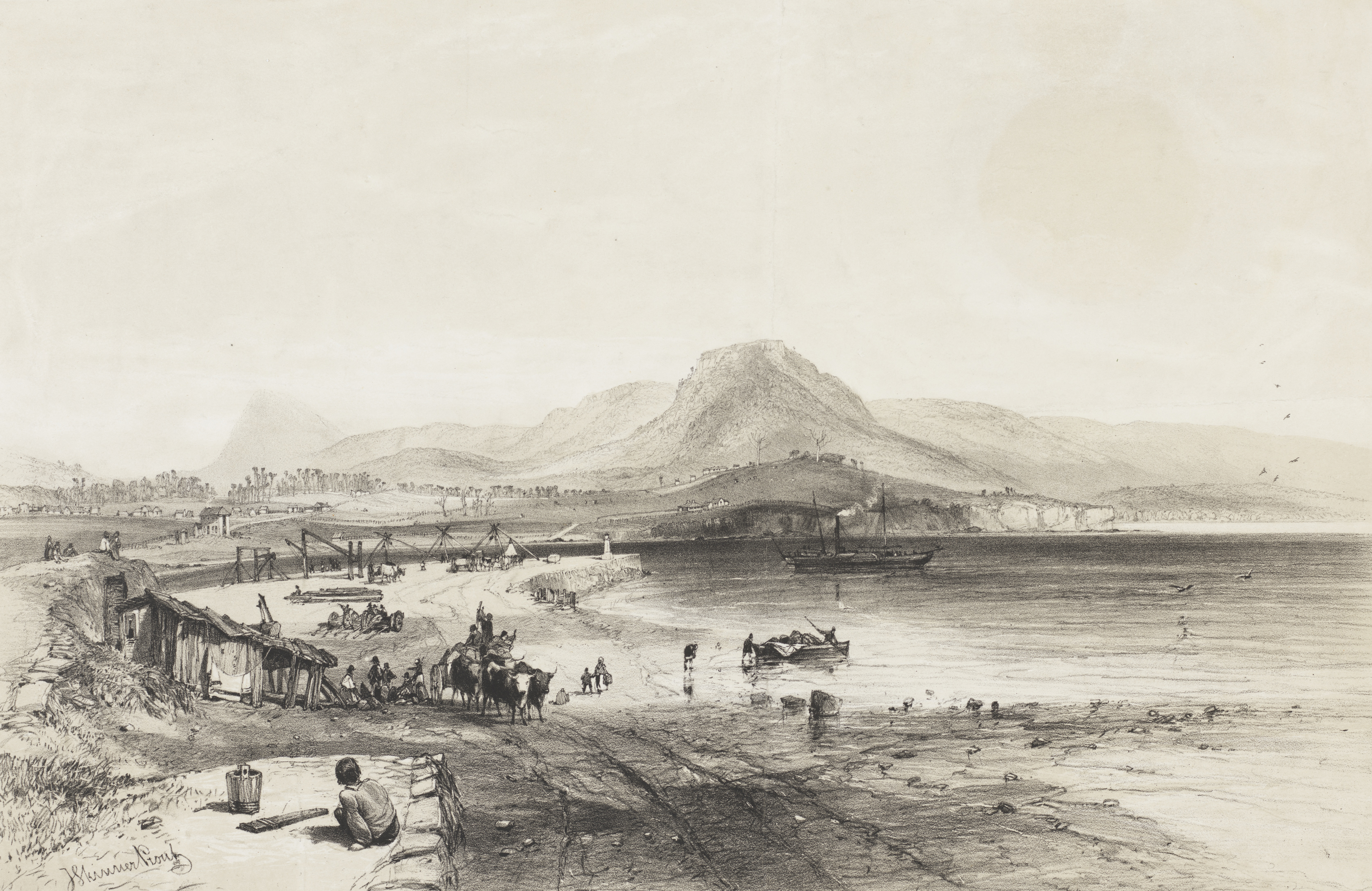
View of Wollongong, New South Wales, c. 1843

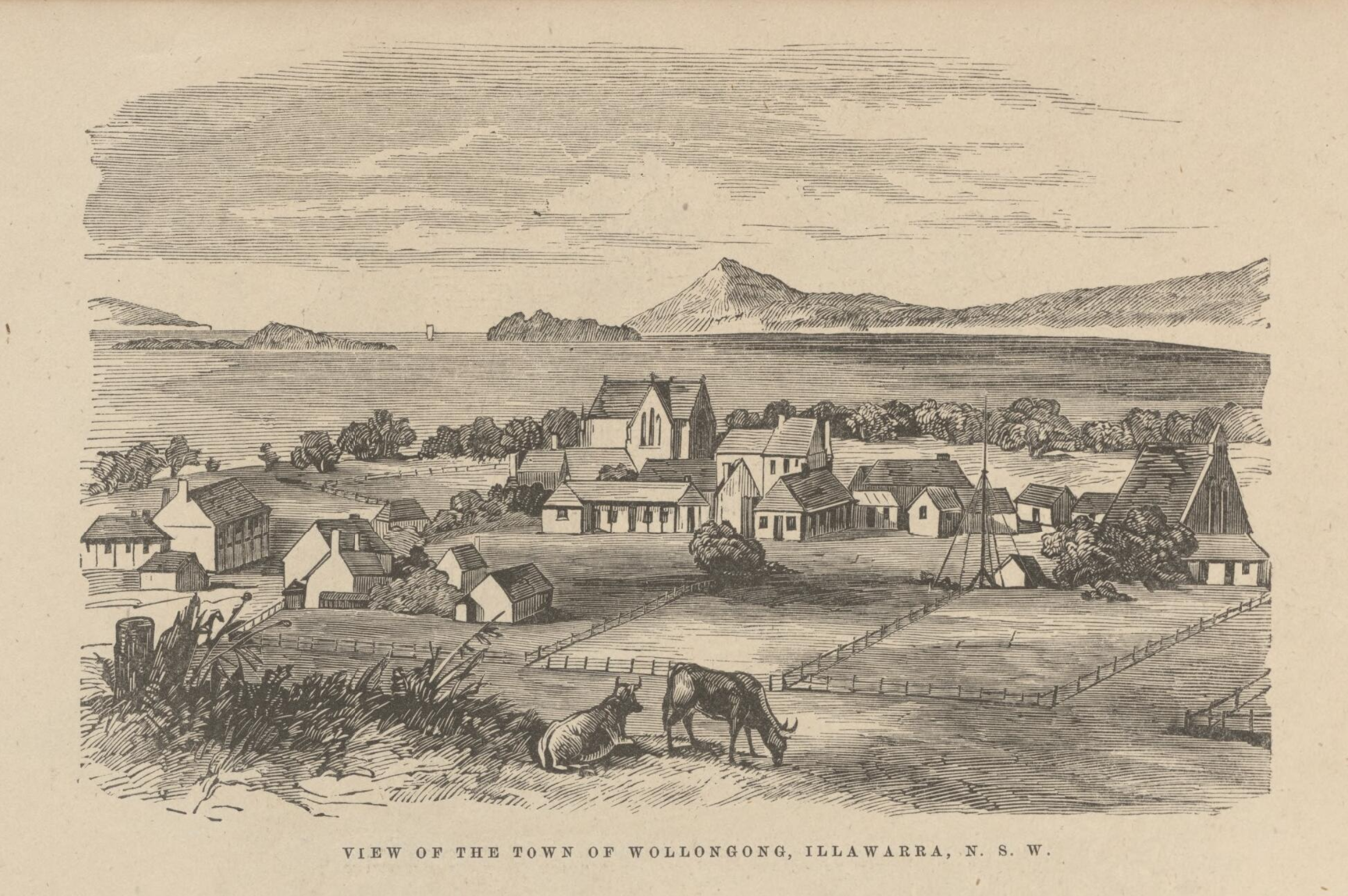
View of the town of Wollongong, Illawarra in 1857

The area was originally inhabited by the Dharawal Indigenous Australians. The first Europeans to visit the area were the navigators George Bass and Matthew Flinders, who landed at Lake Illawarra in 1796. The first settlers in the region were cedar cutters in the early nineteenth century, followed by graziers in 1812. Charles Throsby established a stockman's hut in the area in 1815. The first land grants were made in 1816.

In 1823, Charles Throsby Smith and Sarah Broughton Smith became the first settlers in what is now Wollongong. The former played a significant role during the settlement's first few decades, and is a founding figure for the city.

In 1832, a military barracks was constructed near the harbour. Further settlers arrived and in 1834 a town was planned on the Smith property. On 26 November 1834, the town was first gazetted and George Brown erected the first court house. The main road down the Escarpment through Bulli Pass was built by convict labour in 1835–6, although other passes were built during the 19th century as well, such as O'Briens Road and Rixons Pass. By 1856 Wollongong had a population of 865.

In 1861, a court house was built. In 1858, a horse-drawn tramway from Mount Keira to the harbour was completed. In 1862 a telegraph line was opened between Wollongong and Bellambi. In 1865 the first gas supply in Wollongong was provided from a gas plant in Corrimal Street. In 1868 the extensions to the harbour were opened by Lady Belmore and named Belmore Basin. Patrick Lahiff established a coke works at Wollongong Harbour in the 1870s. He erected two beehive coke ovens between the north eastern end of the basin and Pulpit Rock. The ovens were demolished in 1892. The remains of the coke ovens were uncovered and recovered and are now preserved beneath the hill, with a plaque explaining their history.

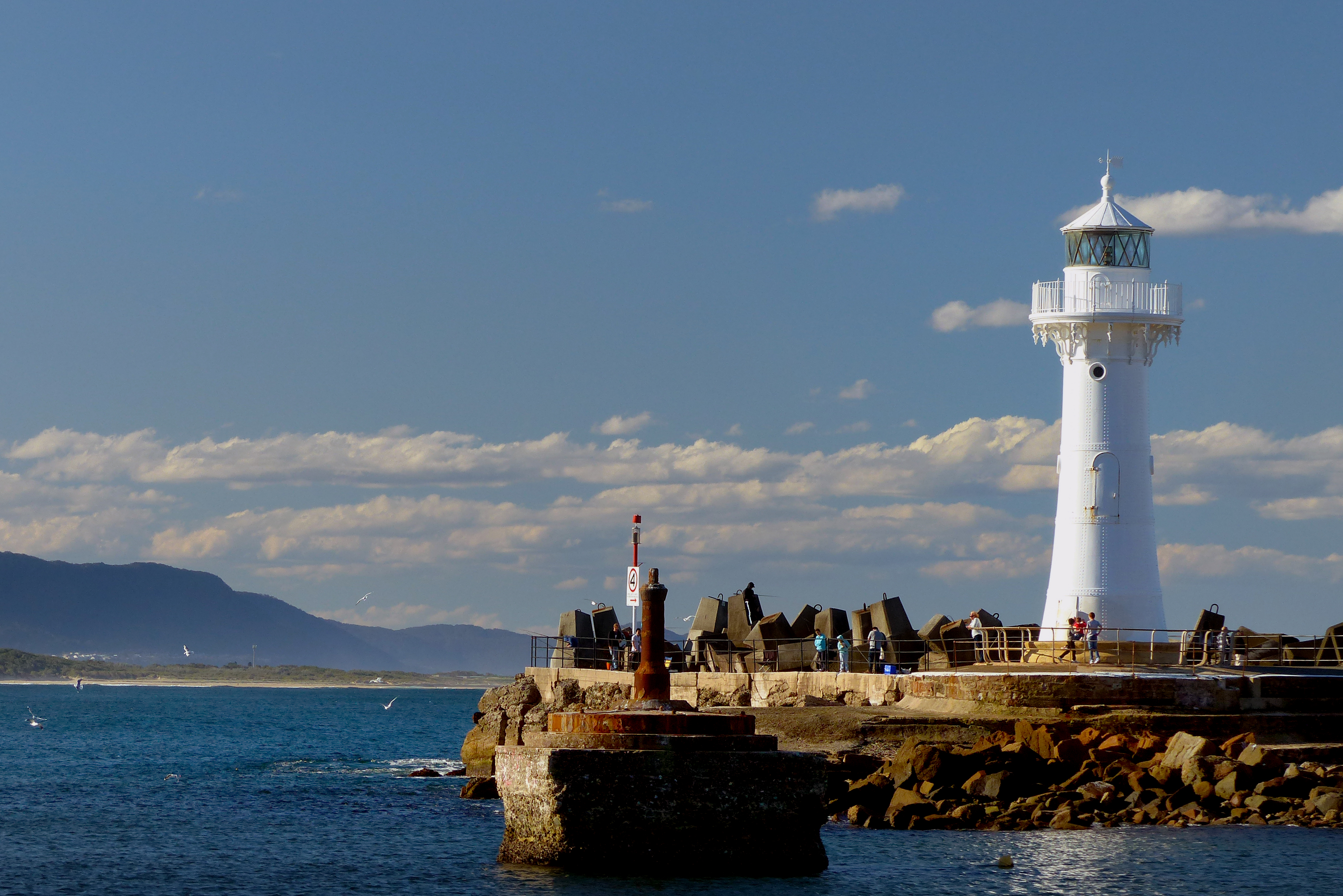
Wollongong Breakwater Lighthouse

In 1871 the first lighthouse was completed. Nevertheless, in 1881 a British clipper, Queen of Nations, ran ashore off the mouth of Towradgi Creek. Her cargo included 24,000 bottles of Hennessy Cognac. Local police and NSW Customs recovered at least 5,500 bottles, but others were looted by members of the public.

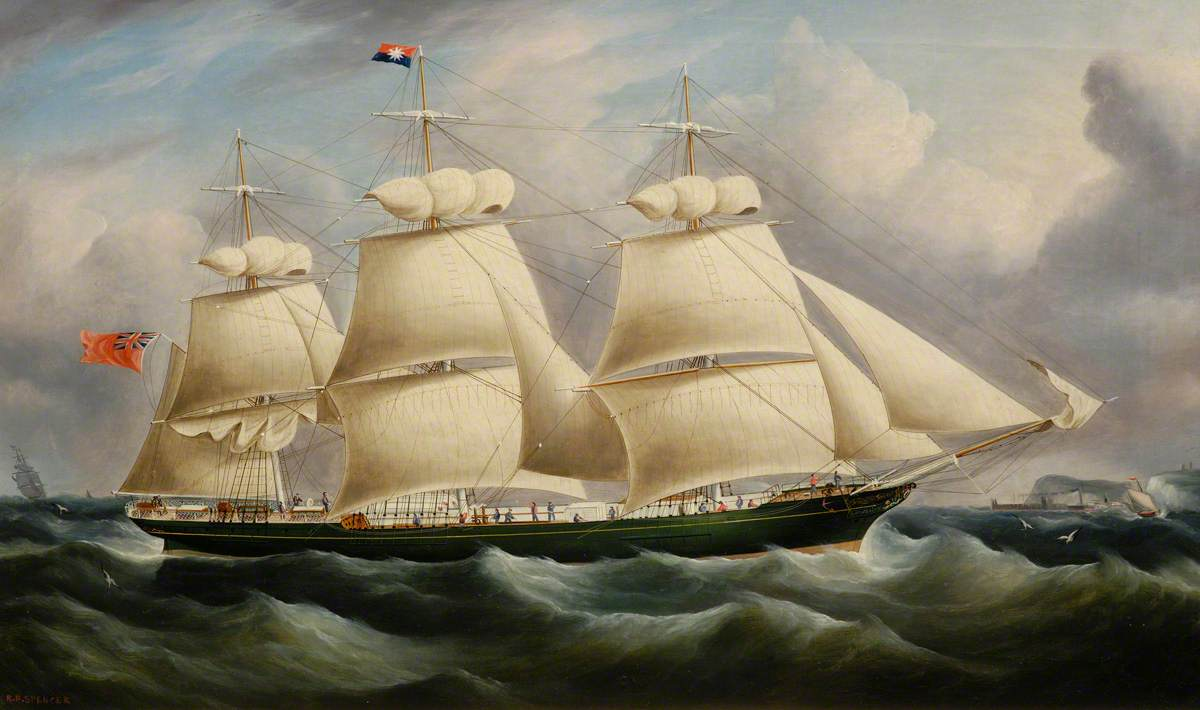
A painting of Queen of Nations by Richard Ball Spencer

The surviving part of the Queen of Nations wreck is only about 70 metres (230 ft) from the shore, in water only 3 to 5 metres (10 to 16 ft) deep. From time to time, a violent storm uncovers part of the wreck. After one such storm in 1991, looting resumed, including of the Cognac. The Commonwealth Government quickly issued an order protecting the wreck under the then Historic Shipwrecks Act 1976. Since 2018 the Underwater Cultural Heritage Act 2018 has automatically protected the wreck and its contents, as they are more than 75 years old.

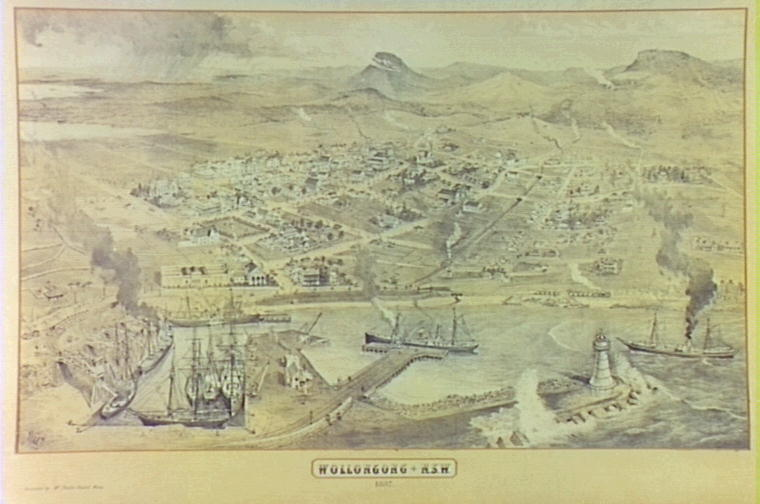
Wollongong N.S.W. 1887; Aerial view of Wollongong Harbour. From the "Illustrated Sydney News" of 15 October 1887.

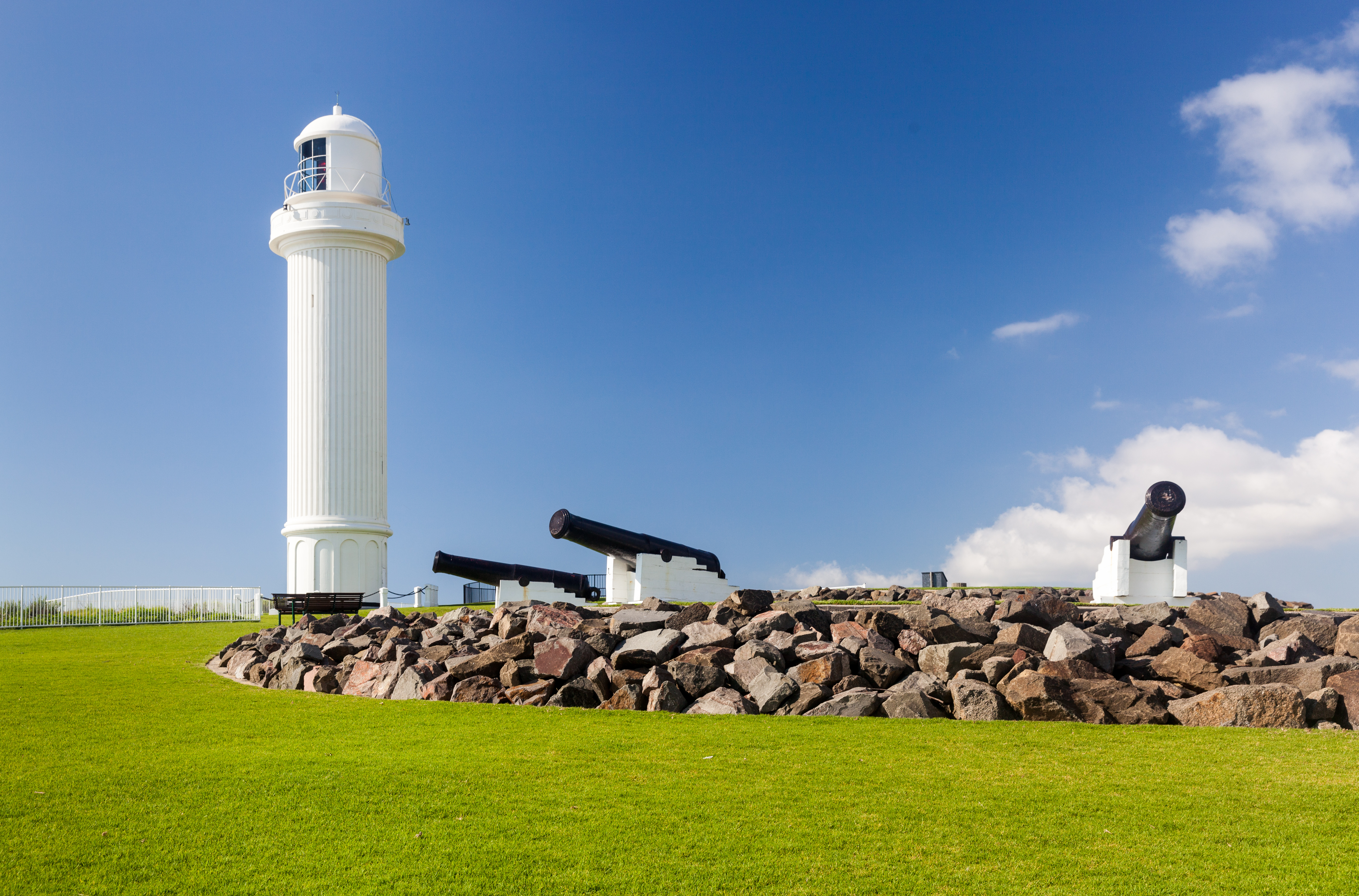
Wollongong Head Lighthouse and the Flagstaff Hill Fort

In 1878 steam locomotives were introduced to haul coal from Mount Keira mine to the harbour. Gas street lighting was introduced in 1883. In 1885 a new court house was erected in Market Street. Like many Australian court houses, it was designed in a Classical Revival style considered appropriate for public buildings. It is now listed on the Register of the National Estate. In 1886 the first town hall was erected. The Illawarra Railway to Wollongong was completed in 1887, and now continues as far south as the town of Bomaderry on the Shoalhaven River. The navigator George Bass first documented the Illawarra coal deposits in 1797. There have been many coalmines in the district. Australia's worst coal mining disaster occurred in 1902, at the Mount Kembla mine when an explosion killed 94 men and boys, the youngest aged 14, the oldest 69. Two other men died attempting to rescue survivors. Survivors were treated at the "A. M. (Albert Memorial) Hospital", which opened in 1864 and closed when the Wollongong Hospital opened in 1907 on Garden Hill. In 1916 the Wollongong High School was opened.

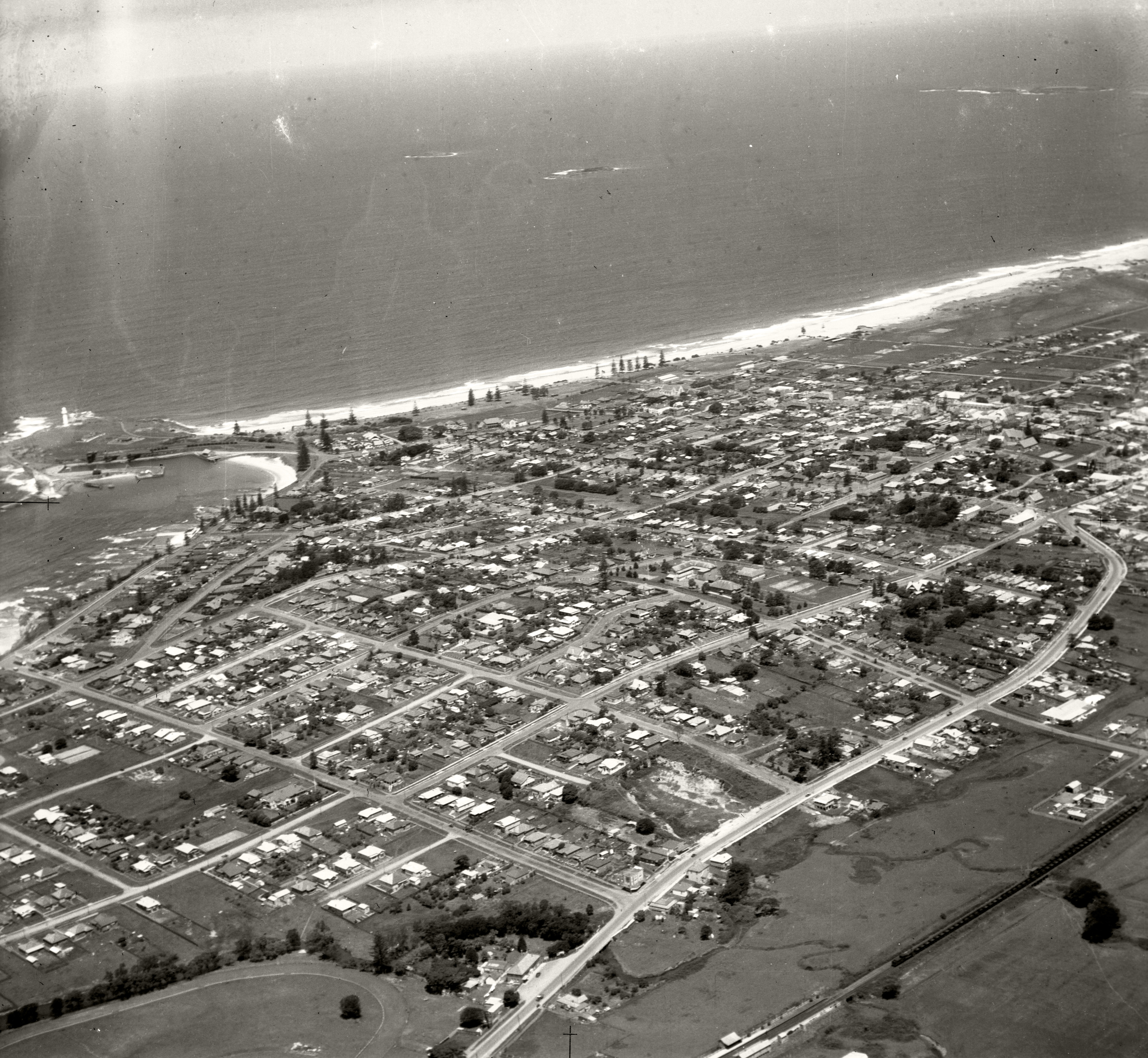
Wollongong in 1937

Heavy industry was attracted to the region by the ready availability of coal. In 1928, Hoskins, later Australian Iron & Steel, started a steelworks at Port Kembla, a few kilometres south of Wollongong. The former Broken Hill Proprietary Company (now BHP after merging with Billiton plc) acquired AI&S in 1935, but has since spun-out their steel division as a separate company, now known as BlueScope. The steelworks has grown to become a world-class flat rolled steel producer, operating as a fully integrated steel plant with a production of around 5 million tonnes per year. Other industries to have set up in the massive Port Kembla industrial complex—the largest single concentration of heavy industry in Australia—include a fertiliser plant, an electrolytic copper smelter, a locomotive workshop, a coal export shipping terminal, a grain export shipping terminal and an industrial gases manufacturing plant.

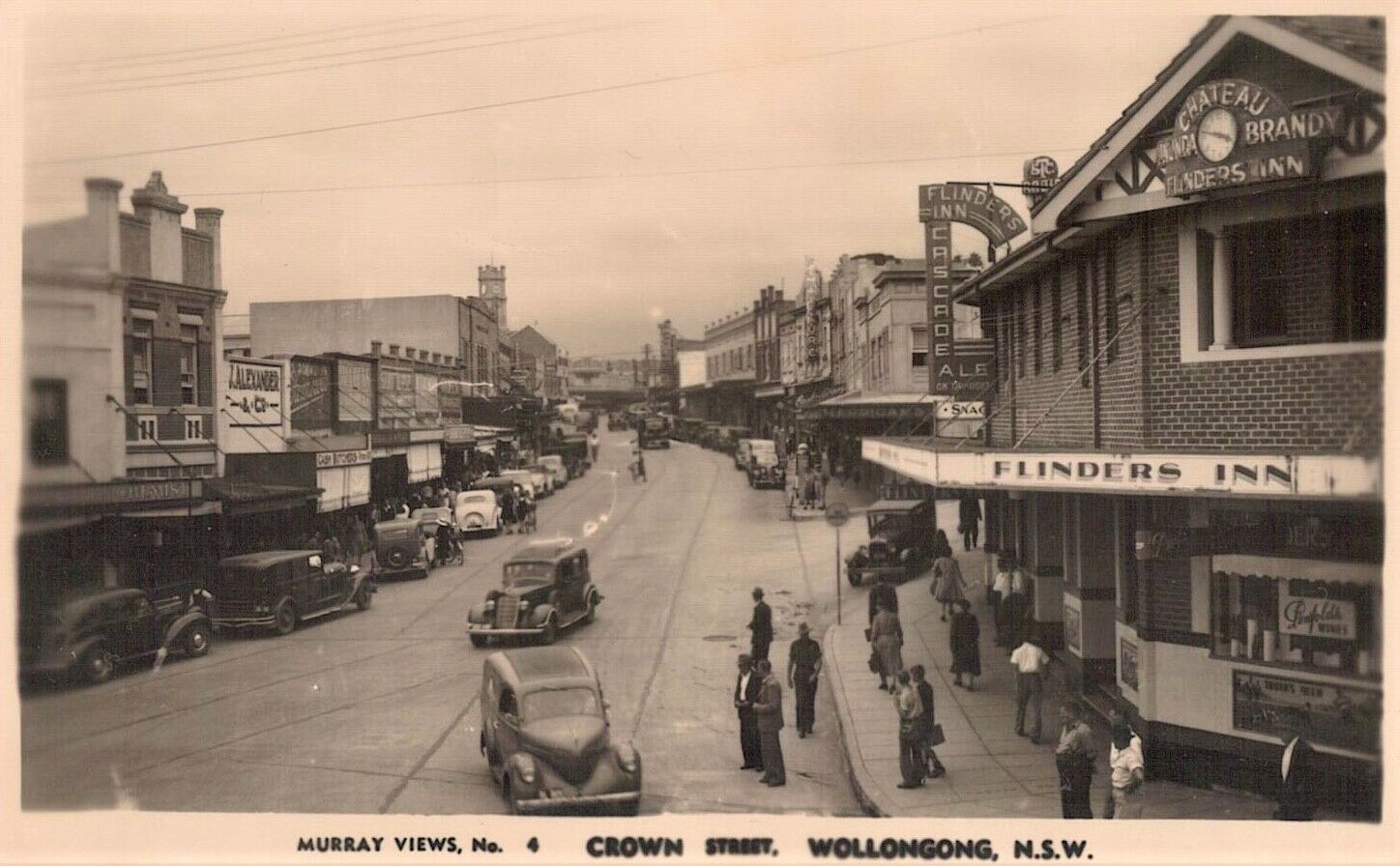
Crown Street in the 1940s

In 1936, the new Wollongong Lighthouse was finished on Flagstaff Point. In 1942 Wollongong was proclaimed a City. In 1947 City of Greater Wollongong was formed. In 1954 the population of Wollongong was 90,852. In 1956 new Wollongong City Council Chambers were opened. In 1961 the Wollongong University College was established. In 1963, the Wollongong Teachers College was established. In 1965 the Westfield shopping centre at Figtree opened.

In 1985, the railway line was electrified to Wollongong, and in 1993 to Dapto. In 1986 the Wollongong Mall was completed. For a short while, trams (trackless trains) were used in the mall, though this ceased due to dangers involved. The mall was re-opened to traffic after the initial test but re-zoned a pedestrian area after and has remained one since.

In 1987, the council chambers and library building were completed, replacing the old council building at the present art gallery site. The Crown Gateway Shopping Centre was completed. Wollongong Mall was opened. In 1988, the current council administration building was completed, as well as the Illawarra Performing Arts Centre (IPAC), across the road on Burelli Street. IPAC was officially opened by Prince Charles and Princess Diana in 1988. A sculpture recognizing Lawrence Hargrave was placed via helicopter on the eastern foothills of Mount Keira. In 1998 the 6000 seat Wollongong Entertainment Centre was opened.

In 1999, the Gateway and Crown Central mall buildings were unified as Wollongong Central and a pedestrian walkway/café was built connecting the buildings in an above ground bridge. In 2000, as part of the Sydney Olympics, the Olympic torch was carried through Wollongong as part of its journey. In 2001, the population of Wollongong reached 181,612. In 2004 the Wollongong City Gallery celebrated its 25th anniversary. In 2005 Qantas established a daily air service from Wollongong to Melbourne that lasted till 2008.

In 2006/2007, the library was renovated, including new facilities, as part of the tenth anniversary of the library's current site. Also at this time the beachfront was renovated with a new lookout and walkway upgrade. In June 2007, erosion was caused via storms to the beaches, the worst in 30 years.

Despite the decline of traditional manufacturing and blue-collar industries due to the abandonment of protectionist economic policies in the 1980s, many of these industrial installations still exist. The city's economy is, however, on the rebound, thanks to diversification of economic activity including higher education, the fine arts, tourism, residential construction and eco-friendly electricity generation; however, the city's economy still relies primarily on heavy industry, and will continue to in the near future.

In 2024, the wreck of a coal ship was discovered by accident off the coast of Wollongong. The ship, the SS Nemesis, was sailing from Wollongong to Melbourne and sank nearly 120 years ago..

== Heritage listings ==
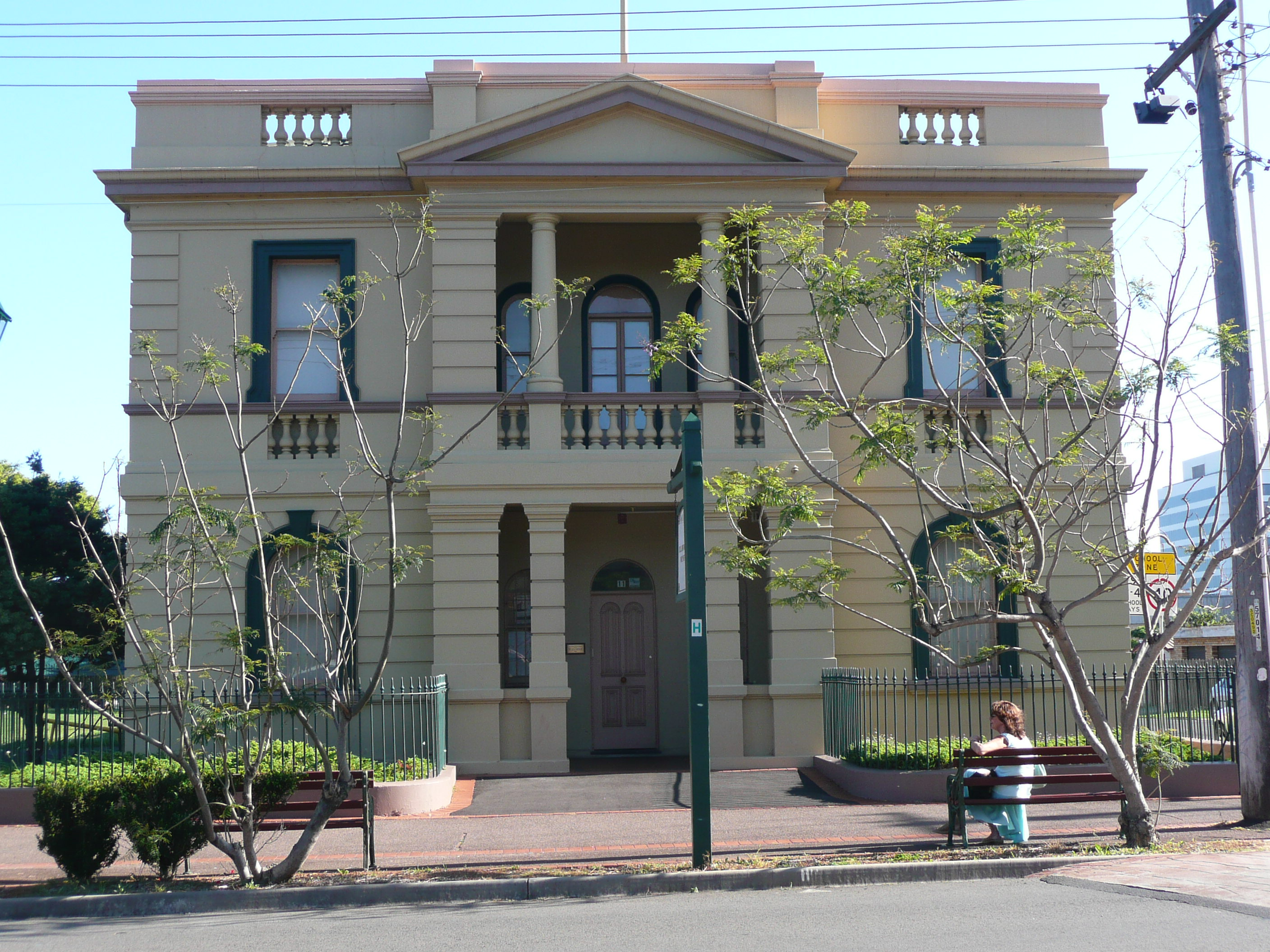
Former Post Office, now the Illawarra Museum

Wollongong has a number of heritage-listed sites, including:

- Church Street: St Michael's Cathedral
- Cliff Road: North Beach Precinct
- Cliff Road and Endeavour Drive: Wollongong Harbour Precinct
- 87 Crown Street: 87 Crown Street
- 91 Crown Street: Old Wollongong East Post Office
- Darling Street: Elouera House
- Illawarra railway: Wollongong railway station
- 197 Keira Street: Regent Theatre
- 11 Market Street: Old Wollongong Telegraph and Post Office
- 31–33 Smith Street: Little Milton

== Geography ==
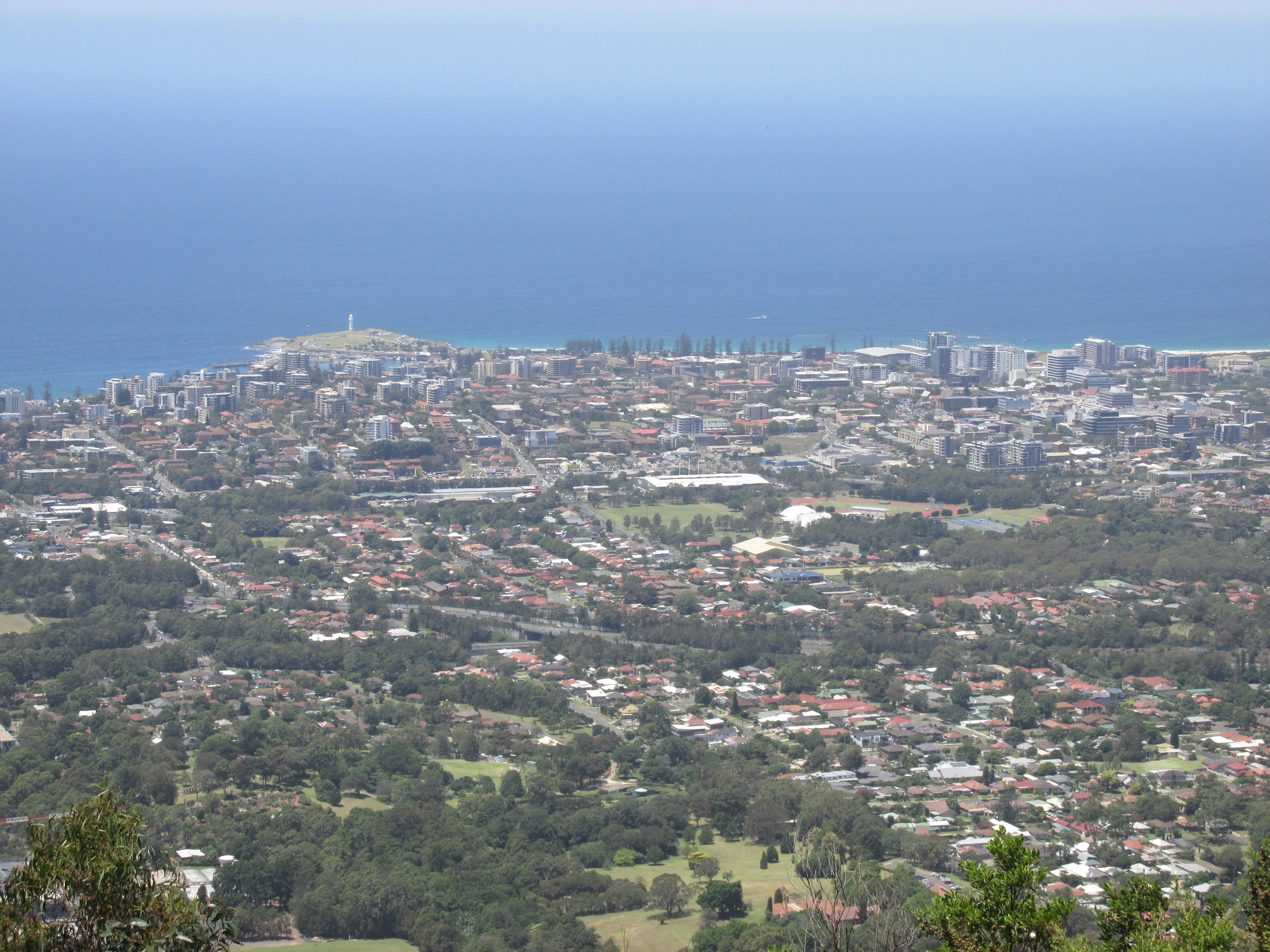
Central Wollongong and its surrounds as viewed from Mount Keira

The city of Wollongong has a distinct geography. It lies on a narrow coastal plain flanked by the Tasman Sea to the east and a steep sandstone precipice known as the Illawarra Escarpment to the west. The coastal plain is widest in the south and narrowest in the north, with the city centre located about midway. South of the city centre but within the urban area is Lake Illawarra, a large lagoon. Although Wollongong sits on the immediate coast, it lies on the same longitude as Greater Western Sydney. The escarpment ranges between 150 and 750 m (490 and 2,460 ft) above sea level, with locally famous mountains such as Mount Keira (464 m (1,522 ft)), Mount Kembla (534 m (1,752 ft)), Broker's Nose (440 m (1,440 ft)) and Mount Murray (768 m (2,520 ft)) to the south. It contains strata of coal measures, and the adit entrances to many coal mines have been established along the slopes of the escarpment throughout Wollongong. Suburbia encroaches on the escarpment's lower slopes in some areas, but the majority remains in a relatively natural state forested with dry sclerophyll and pockets of temperate rainforest. The escarpment is largely protected by a State Conservation Area and local scenic protection zoning, and provides the visual backdrop to the city.

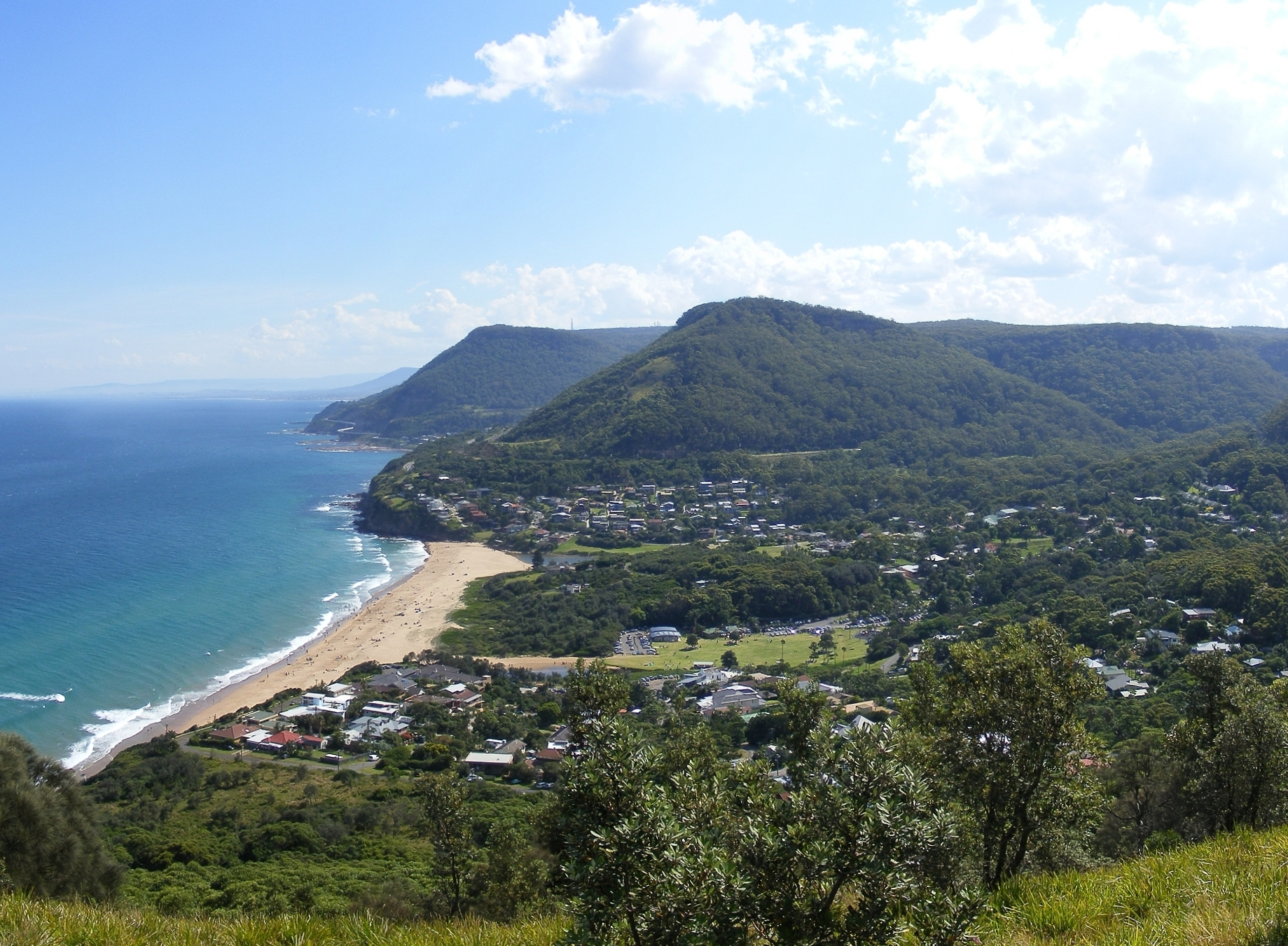
Scenic view of Wollongong's northern coastline from Bald Hill, overlooking Stanwell Park

In the north the escarpment meets the coastline, and north of this the coastal road Lawrence Hargrave Drive hugs the cliff line. The unstable geology of the escarpment resulted in rockfalls, forcing the closure of the road. Subsequently, part of Lawrence Hargrave Drive was replaced in 2005 by the Sea Cliff Bridge just off the coast, crossing the submerged rock shelf. The bridge carries both vehicular and pedestrian traffic. The Illawarra railway line must go through several tunnels to reach the Sydney metropolitan area. The Southern Freeway and Princes Highway provide alternative inland routes, descending the escarpment further south at Bulli Pass or at Mount Ousley, entering just north of Wollongong's city centre.

To the south the plain reaches its maximum extent around Albion Park where it incorporates a large coastal saltwater lagoon called Lake Illawarra, separated from the Pacific Ocean by a long sandy spit.

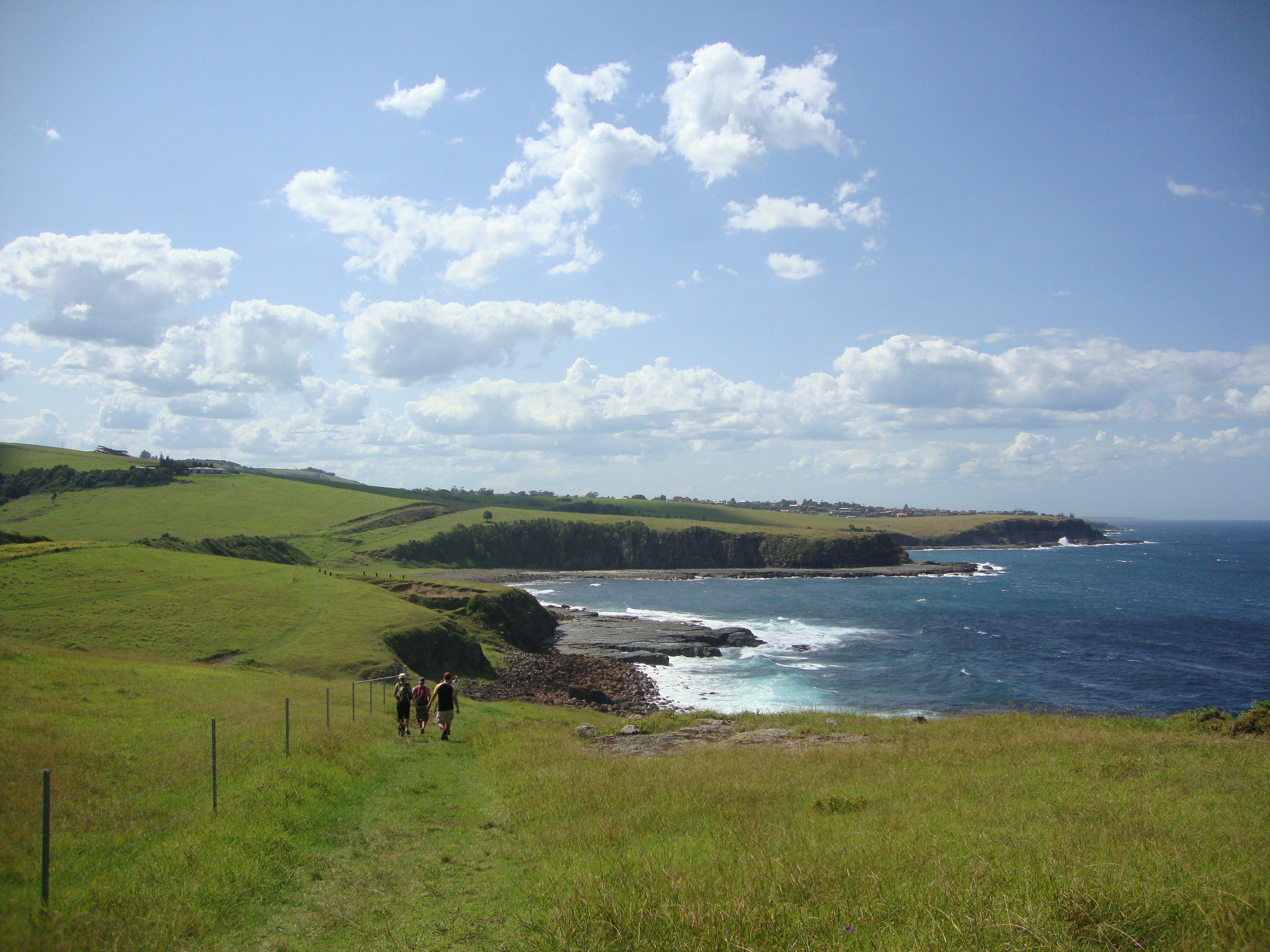
Wollongong's coastline on the outskirts of the city

The coastal strip consists of highly fertile alluvium, which made Wollongong so attractive to agriculturists in the nineteenth century. It contains many hills including the foothills of the escarpment's lower slopes, and while these generally do not exceed one hundred metres in height they give much of the city an undulating character. The coastal strip is traversed by several short but flood-prone and fast-flowing streams and creeks such as Fairy Creek (Para Creek), Cabbage Tree Creek, Allans Creek, Nostaw Ravine, Jimbob Creek, Mullet Creek and Macquarie Rivulet.

The coastline consists of many beaches characterised by fine pale gold-coloured sands; however, these beaches are sometimes interrupted by prominent and rocky headlands, such as Tego Rock, jutting into the sea. In places these headlands have been excavated or extended to create artificial harbours at Wollongong, Port Kembla, Shellharbour and Kiama. Just off the coast south of Wollongong centre, near Port Kembla, lies a group of five islands known collectively as The Five Islands. The islands are a wildlife refuge.

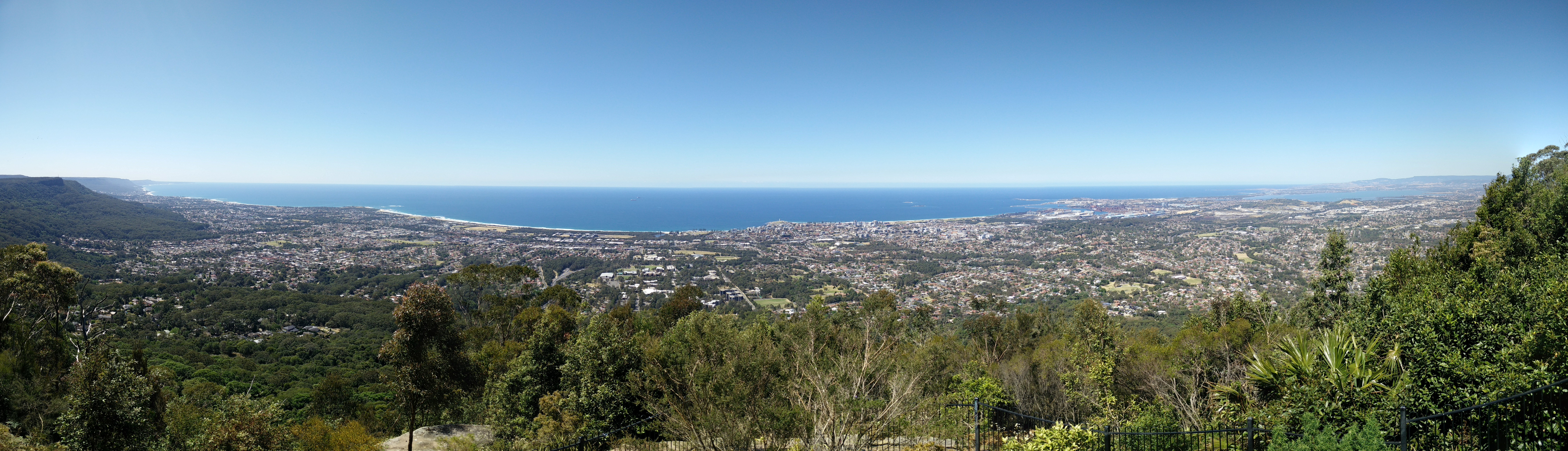
Lookout from the Illawarra escarpment above the Wollongong metropolitan area

=== Climate ===
Wollongong has an oceanic climate (Köppen: Cfb), bordering on humid subtropical (Cfa) as its warmest month mean of 21.9 °C (71.4 °F) is just below the subtropical isotherm of 22 °C (72 °F). The highest recorded temperature is 44.1 °C on 1 January 2006, and the lowest 0.8 °C on 27 July 1986. Annually, Wollongong receives 107.4 clear days.

Rainfall is spread through the months but has a bias to the first half of the year. It is often associated with orographic lift caused by the escarpment and its exposed location on the Tasman Sea, which makes it more prone to moist easterlies. A significant flood event occurred on 18 August 1998 when Wollongong recorded 316 mm of rainfall (the nearby suburb of Mt Ousley recorded in excess of 445 mm), mostly falling in a 3-hour period. Wollongong also experiences thunderstorms during the warmer months bringing lightning, heavy rain and occasionally hail.

July and August are known as the windy months, with westerly gales that can gust at over 100 km/h. These are generally dry foehn winds off the Great Dividing Range, which are common in the winter and spring on the leeward side of the Ranges.

Climate data for Wollongong University (1970–2008)
Month	Jan	Feb	Mar	Apr	May	Jun	Jul	Aug	Sep	Oct	Nov	Dec	Year
Record high °C (°F)	44.1 (111.4)	41.7 (107.1)	40.2 (104.4)	35.4 (95.7)	28.5 (83.3)	24.7 (76.5)	25.7 (78.3)	30.3 (86.5)	34.2 (93.6)	38.8 (101.8)	40.6 (105.1)	41.5 (106.7)	44.1 (111.4)
Mean daily maximum °C (°F)	25.8 (78.4)	25.8 (78.4)	24.5 (76.1)	22.6 (72.7)	20.1 (68.2)	17.9 (64.2)	17.2 (63.0)	18.6 (65.5)	20.7 (69.3)	22.5 (72.5)	23.1 (73.6)	24.9 (76.8)	22.0 (71.6)
Mean daily minimum °C (°F)	17.9 (64.2)	18.1 (64.6)	16.6 (61.9)	13.8 (56.8)	11.6 (52.9)	9.6 (49.3)	8.4 (47.1)	8.6 (47.5)	10.5 (50.9)	12.5 (54.5)	14.2 (57.6)	16.3 (61.3)	13.2 (55.8)
Record low °C (°F)	9.6 (49.3)	10.3 (50.5)	9.1 (48.4)	5.1 (41.2)	3.1 (37.6)	2.0 (35.6)	0.8 (33.4)	2.0 (35.6)	3.3 (37.9)	4.7 (40.5)	5.4 (41.7)	8.3 (46.9)	0.8 (33.4)
Average rainfall mm (inches)	130.3 (5.13)	156.4 (6.16)	160.4 (6.31)	129.3 (5.09)	106.4 (4.19)	112.4 (4.43)	63.4 (2.50)	83.3 (3.28)	67.4 (2.65)	100.5 (3.96)	115.6 (4.55)	94.6 (3.72)	1,320.9 (52.00)
Average rainy days	13.8	13.7	14.5	11.2	10.8	9.7	8.5	7.8	9.3	11.4	13.6	13.0	137.3
Average afternoon relative humidity (%)	68	69	66	63	62	59	54	52	55	61	64	64	61

== Urban structure ==
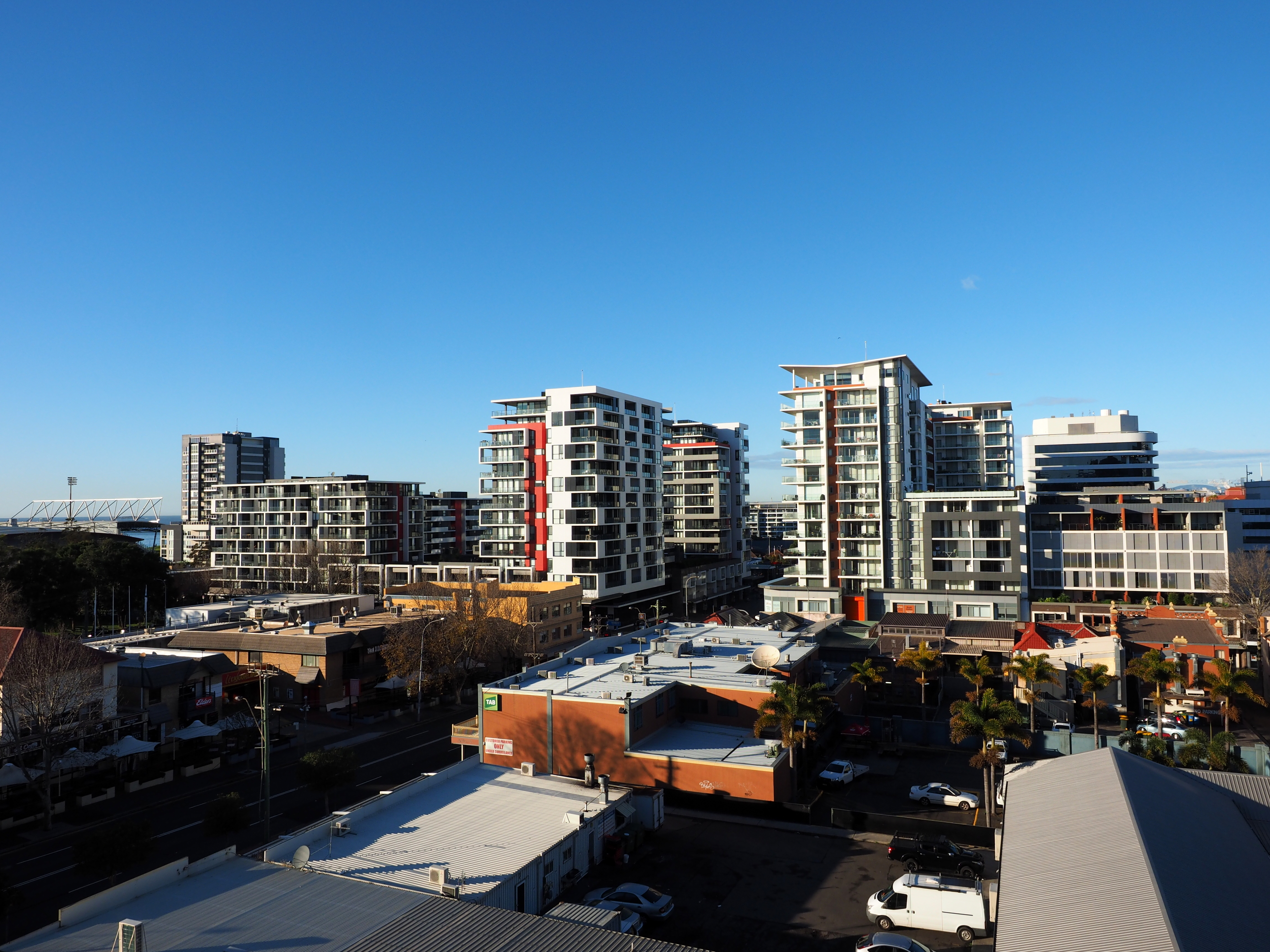
Wollongong city centre

The inner city area includes the suburbs of Wollongong and North Wollongong, extending from Fairy Meadow in the north, west to include the Wollongong Hospital, and south to the Greenhouse Park. At the 2016 census, the suburb of Wollongong had a population of 18,442.

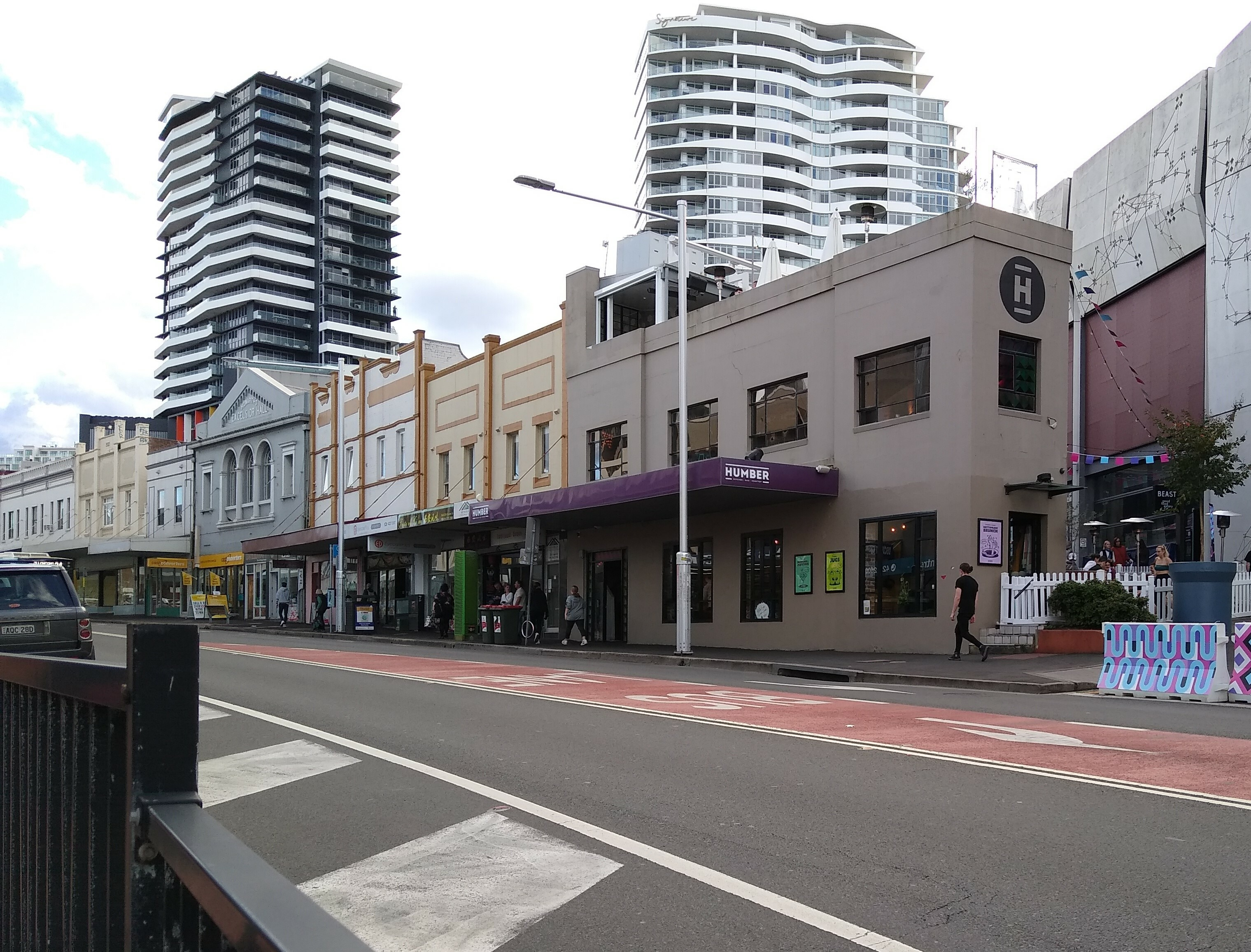
Crown Street

The CBD is a major commercial hub containing many department stores and specialty shops, offices, and entertainment venues. It is centred on the Crown Street Mall and Wollongong Central, and approximates the area bounded by Market, Corrimal, and Burelli streets and the railway line. Surrounding the CBD lies a mixture of parks, reserves, light commercial property, houses and multi-story residential units. Multi-story housing is evident particularly on Smith's Hill, north-east of the CBD, reflecting the popularity of combining inner-city living, coastal views and a beachside lifestyle. To the east of the city lies Flagstaff Point, a rocky headland with eroded low cliffs topped by a grassy hill. The northern side of the point was excavated by convict labour to form Belmore Basin. This was later extended with the northern breakwater to create Wollongong Harbour. The area is the site of a historic colonial fort, several restored cannons and two lighthouses, a feature peculiar to the east coast of Australia. The older Wollongong Breakwater Lighthouse at the harbour entrance was made of wrought iron plates in 1871, and has become an icon of the city. The newer Wollongong Head Lighthouse was constructed in 1936 atop the Flagstaff Hill and is still used in the early 21st century. Belmore Basin houses the commercial fishing fleet and Fisherman's Co-op, while the main harbour shelters private vessels.

The main beaches of central Wollongong are North Wollongong (or simply North [gong]) Beach, extending from the harbour up to the Fairy lagoon and Puckeys Estate Reserve, and Wollongong City Beach, extending south from Flagstaff Point and into Coniston Beach.

== Demographics ==
The Wollongong metropolitan area includes the suburbs, outlying towns and rural localities stretching from Helensburgh in the north to Kiama in the south. According to the 2021 census, it had a population of 305,691.

- Aboriginal and Torres Strait Islander people made up 3.6% of the population.
- 76.3% of people were born in Australia. The next most common countries of birth were England 3.9%, North Macedonia 1.3%, New Zealand 1.1%, Italy 0.9% and India 0.9%.
- 81.7% of people spoke only English at home. Other languages spoken at home included Macedonian 2.0%, Italian 1.1%, Arabic 1.1%, Mandarin 0.8%, and Spanish 0.8%.
- The most common responses for religion were No Religion 38.0%, Catholic 23.3% and Anglican 13.6%.
- 5.1% of employed people worked in Hospitals (except Psychiatric Hospitals). Other major industries of employment included Other Social Assistance Services 3.1%, Aged Care Residential Services 2.8%, Supermarket and Grocery Stores 2.6% and Takeaway Food Services 2.5%.
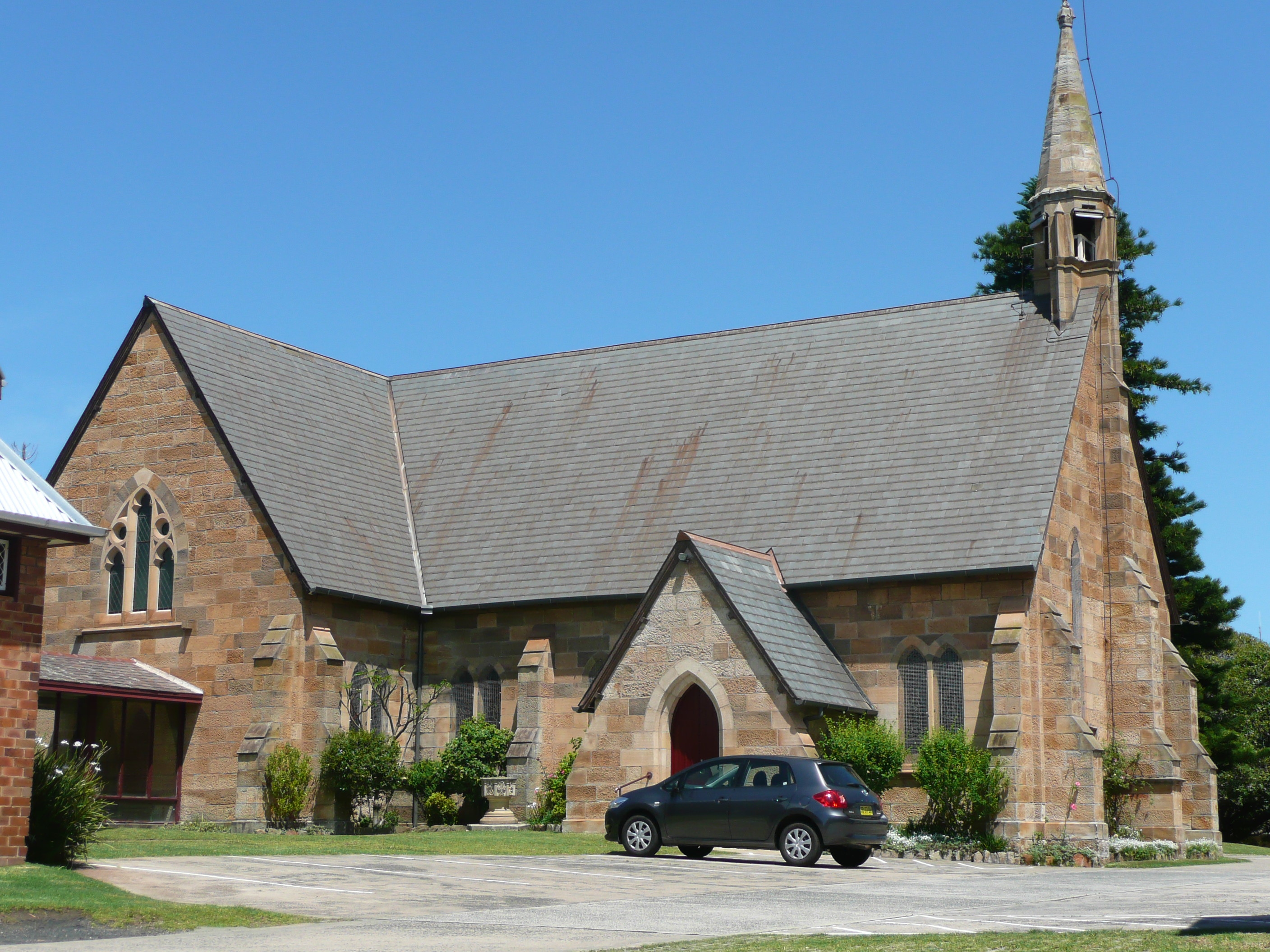
St Michael's Cathedral

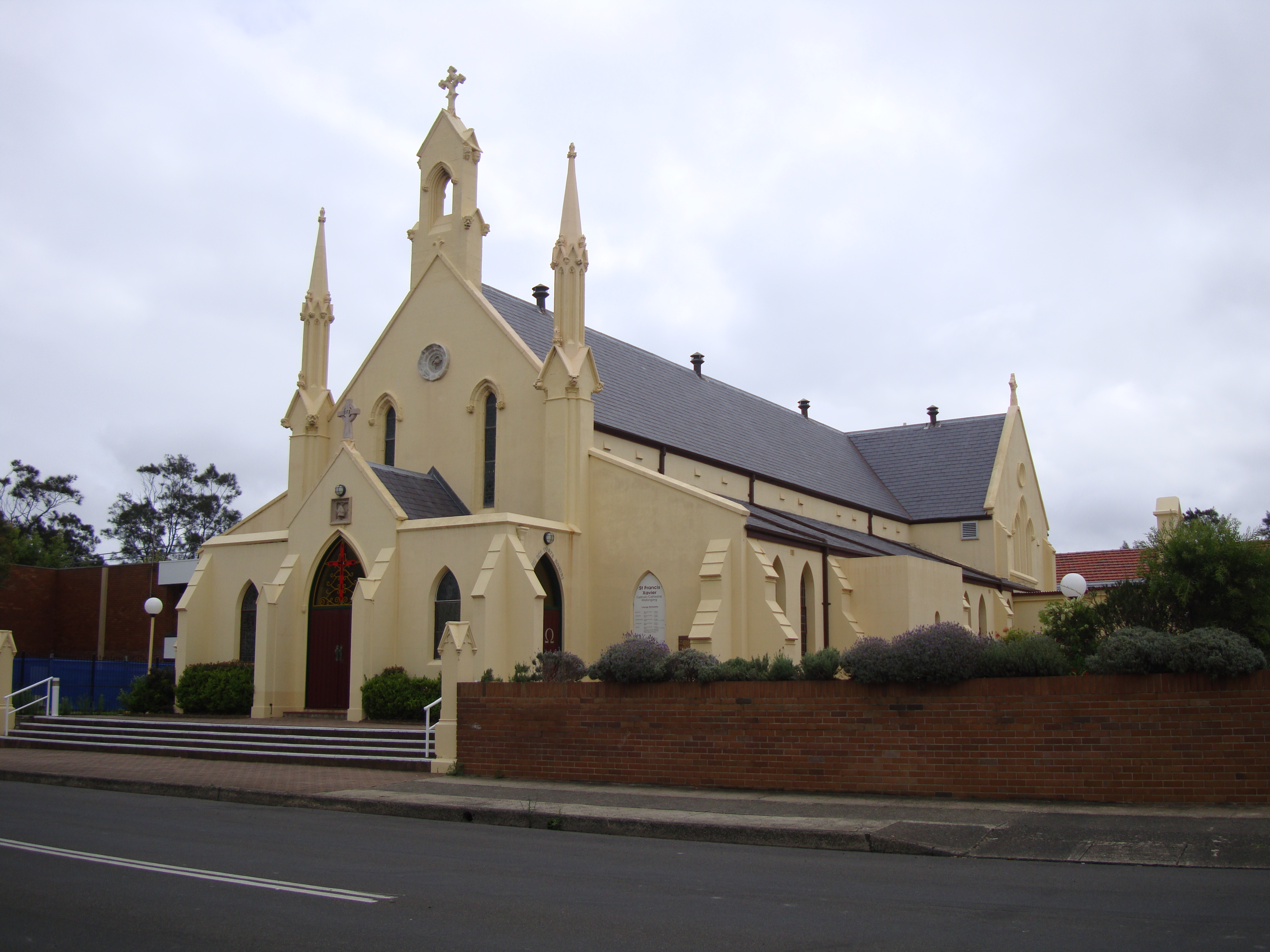
St Francis Xavier Cathedral

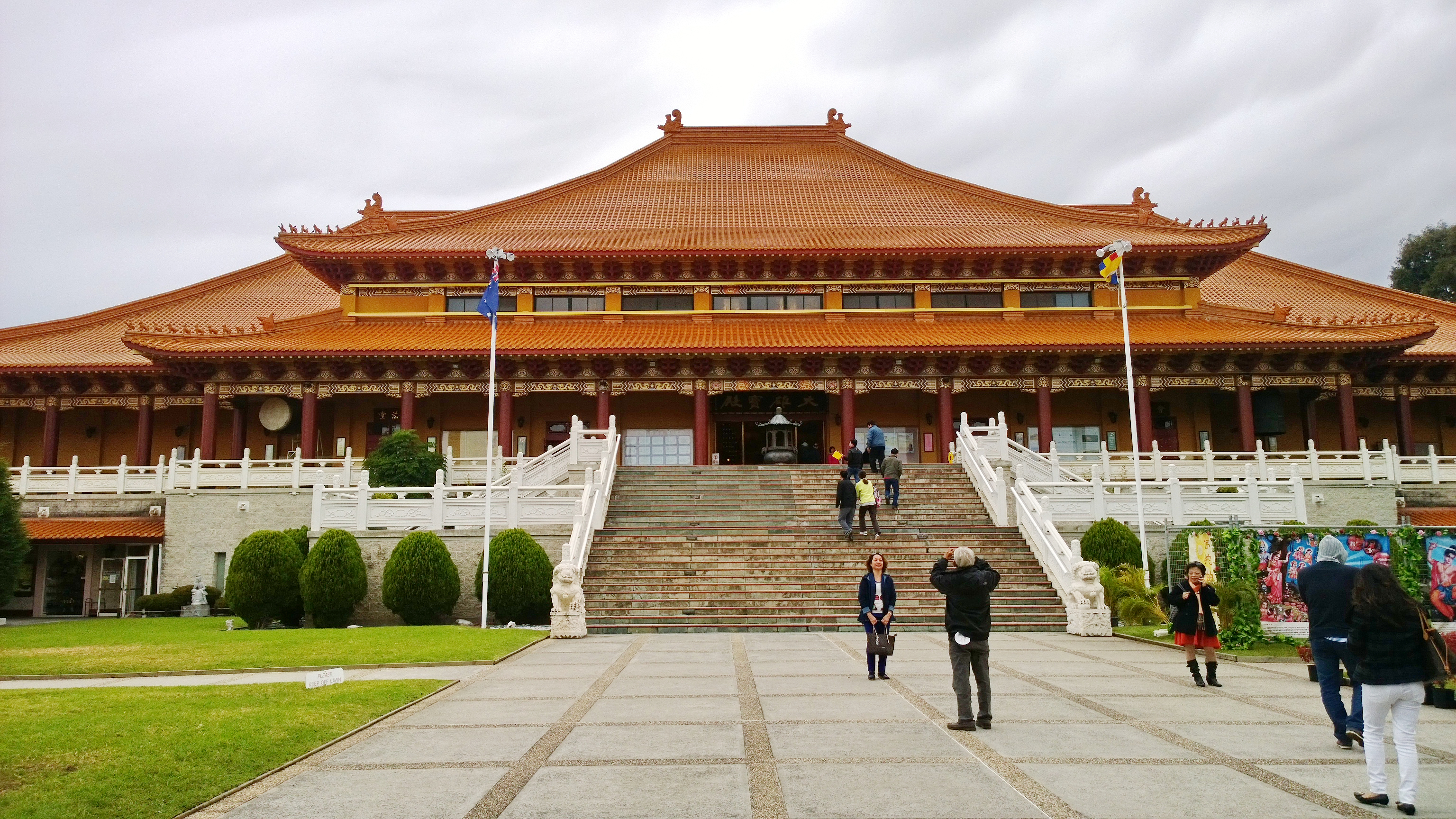
Nan Tien Temple

It is the third largest city in New South Wales and the tenth largest in Australia. Using 2006 ABS geography, around 89% of the statistical district's population reside in the built-up urban centre extending from Clifton to Shell Cove.

Wollongong is continuing to grow with a population growth of 3.1% for the period 2001 to 2006, although the supply of new residential land is limited by the geography particularly in the northern suburbs. The west Dapto area is a major centre of future growth with plans for 19,000 new dwellings and 50,000 people within 40 years. New residential areas are also being developed further south around the Albion Park, Shell Cove and Kiama areas.

Wollongong Population Growth 1947–2010 (Statistical Local Area)
Year	Population	Increase	Growth
1947	70,135		
1954	100,725	30,590	43.6%
1961	150,387	49,662	49.3%
1966	177,432	27,045	18.0%
1971	202,800	25,368	14.3%
1976	222,250	19,450	9.6%
1981	231,400	9,150	4.1%
1986	232,240	840	0.4%
1991	244,930	12,690	5.5%
1996	255,740	10,810	4.4%
2001	269,597	13,857	5.4%
2006	277,984	8,387	3.1%
2010	292,190	14,206	5.1%
Source: 1947–1996 2001–2010

Wollongong has a distinctly multicultural population. Many migrants were attracted to the area by the job opportunities at the Port Kembla steelworks in the post-war period, and settled in surrounding suburbs such as Cringila, Warrawong and Coniston. By 1966 about 60% of the wage earners at the Australian Iron and Steel steelworks were born overseas coming from over 100 countries. These included British, Irish, Macedonians, Spaniards, Portuguese, Greeks, Italians, Arabs, Russians, Bosnians, Croatians, Serbians, Albanians, Germans, Turks, Lebanese, Chileans and Brazilians. With the end of the White Australia policy these were followed by Indo-Chinese refugees in the 1970s, Indians, Filipinos, Chinese, Japanese, Malaysians, Singaporeans, Koreans, Vietnamese, Cambodians, and Pacific Islanders in the 1980s and 1990s. The University of Wollongong continues to attract students and staff from all over the world, with around 5,000 overseas student enrolments and countless overseas professors working there.

Around 20,000 people commute daily to jobs in Sydney by road and rail, making it one of the busiest commuter corridors in Australia.

== Politics and government ==
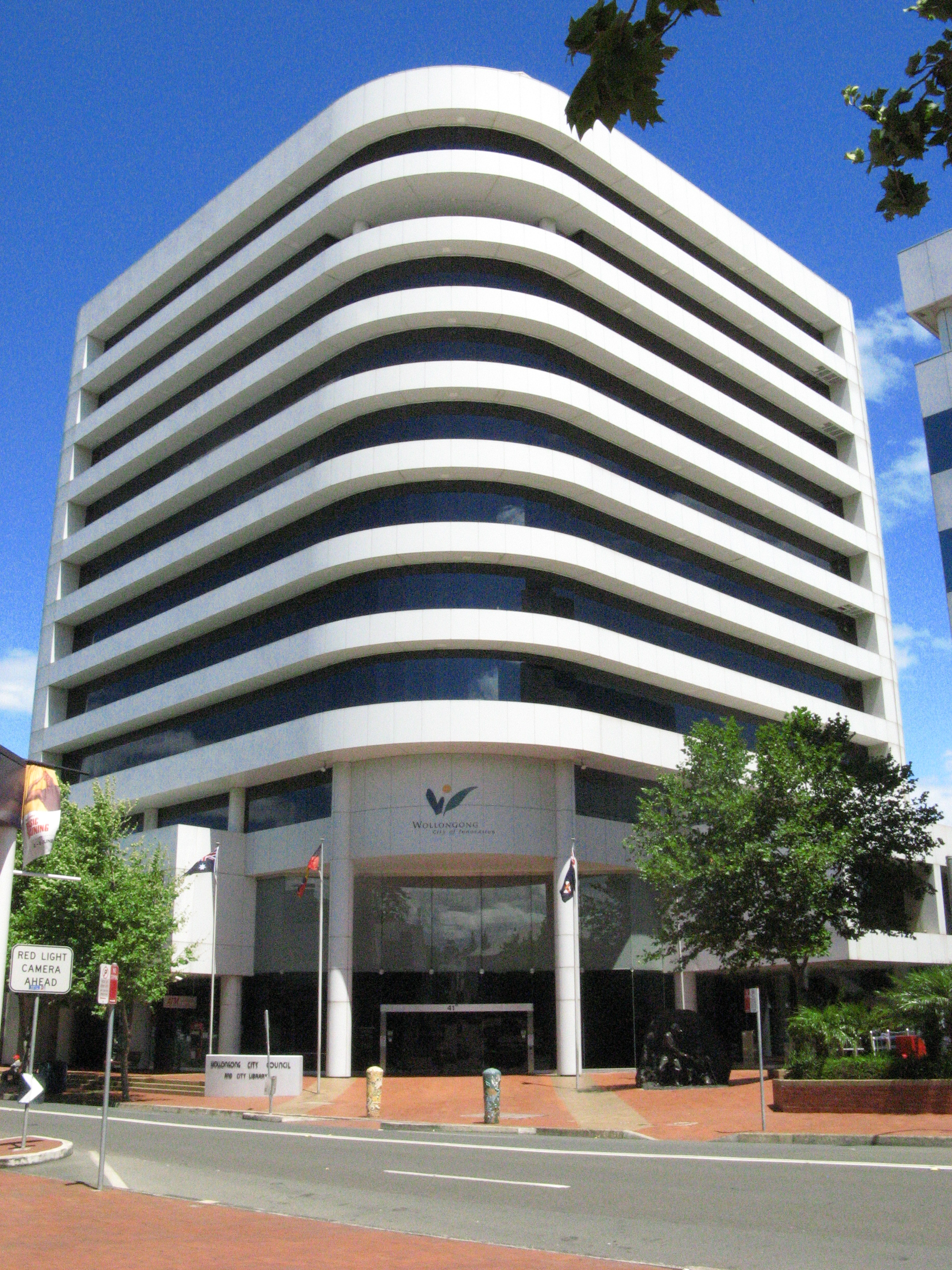
Wollongong City Council

Two federal divisions in the House of Representatives are mostly or entirely located in Greater Wollongong: Cunningham and Whitlam, with a very small portion of Gilmore being in the far southern suburbs of the city. On the state level, there are four electoral districts of the Legislative Assembly that are mostly or entirely located in Wollongong: Heathcote, Keira, Shellharbour and Wollongong, with a very small portion of Kiama being in the far southern suburbs of the city.

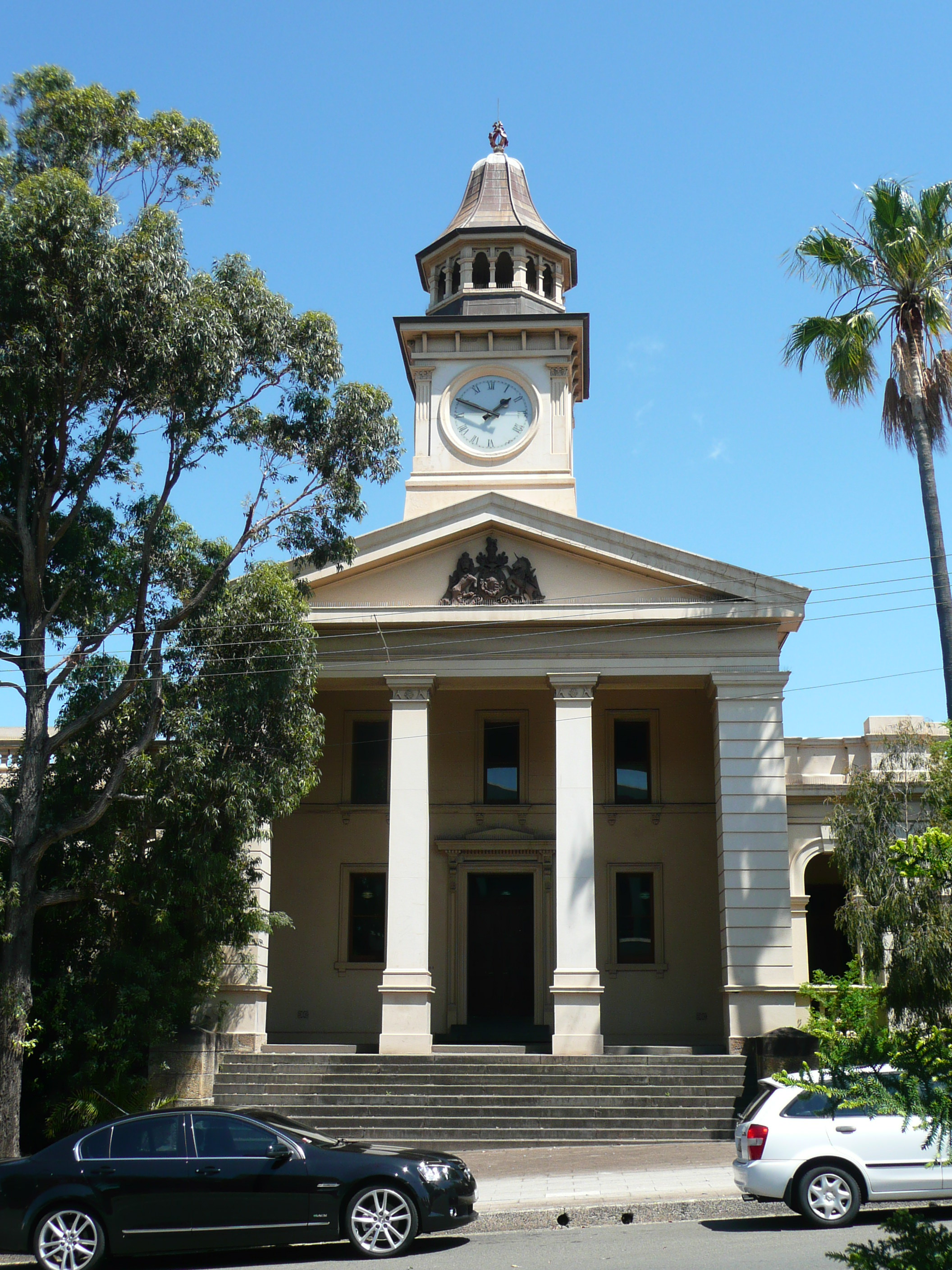
Wollongong Court House

The city of Wollongong has traditionally voted for the centre-left Labor Party over the centre-right Liberal Party. Labor holds both of the two federal seats mostly or entirely located in Wollongong, as well as all four of the state seats that are mostly or entirely located in Wollongong. However, the Liberal Party has held the Wollongong-based state seat of Heathcote multiple times (including for 12 consecutive years from the Coalition's 2011 landslide victory until Labor's return to power in 2023, note that redistribution made Heathcote a notional Labor seat as it moved south to included more of Wollongong and less of southern Sydney). However, even in 2011 (when Labor suffered the worst defeat of a sitting New South Wales government in the state's history and the Coalition won the largest majority government in the state's history), Labor still won every Wollongong-based seat except Heathcote, making the Illawarra the only region in the state where Labor won more seats than the Coalition. The last time the Liberals won a Wollongong-based state seat other than Heathcote was in 1968, when the Coalition won the seat of Wollongong for one term before Labor regained it in 1971.

On the local level, there are two Wollongong-based local government areas (LGAs): the City of Wollongong and the City of Shellharbour, with a very small portion of the Municipality of Kiama being located in the far southern suburbs of the city. The City of Wollongong is represented by a directly elected Lord Mayor (currently Tania Brown) and 12 councillors (four each per ward): with Labor having eight seats, the Greens having three and the remaining two seats being held by independents Andrew Anthony and Ryan Morris. The City of Shellharbour has an indirectly elected Mayor (currently independent Chris Homer) and eight councillors: four generic independents, three Labor councillors and one councillor from the Kellie Marsh Independent Team.

== Education ==
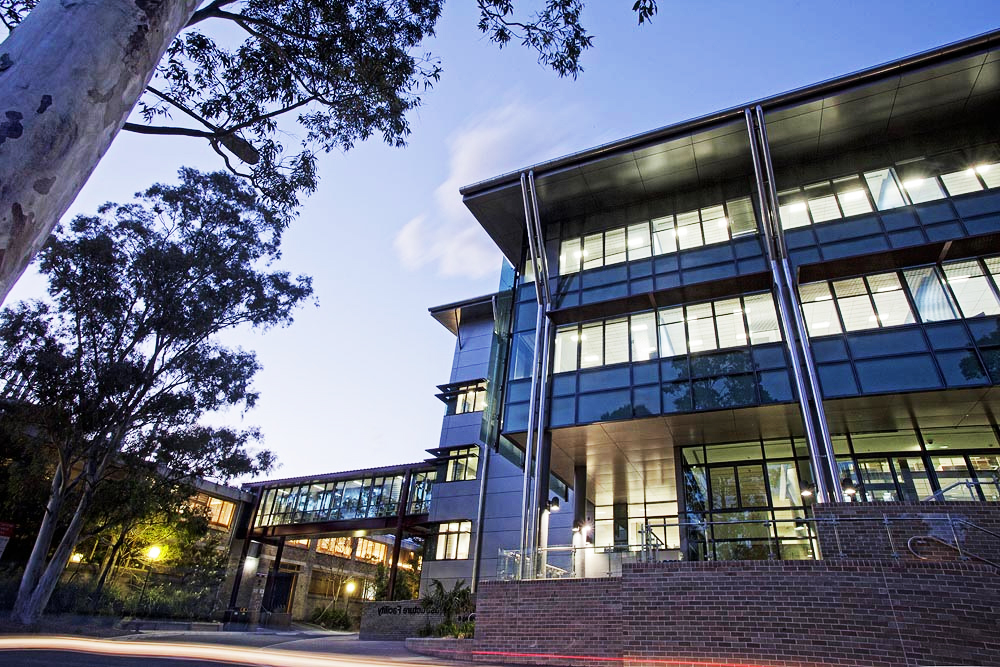
The SMART Infrastructure Facility, on the University of Wollongong campus

=== Tertiary and further education ===
There are two campuses of the Illawarra Institute of TAFE. The Wollongong Campus is the network's largest campus, and it offers a variety of courses.

Wollongong has one university, the University of Wollongong, which was formerly part of the University of New South Wales. The university was awarded the "Australian University of the Year" in two consecutive years (1999–2000, 2000–2001) by the Good Universities Guide, and is internationally recognised. It has two main campuses: the primary campus on Northfields Avenue, and the Innovation Campus on Squires Way. The university's Sydney Business School also has a secondary campus in Sydney.

=== Schools ===
Wollongong has a number of primary and high schools, including public, denominational and independent.

== Media ==
Wollongong has one daily newspaper, The Illawarra Mercury, published and issued Monday to Saturday by Australian Community Media (ACM). Additionally, ACM publishes several free community newspapers, including the Advertiser incorporating Lake Times and Kiama Independent.

Wollongong and the Illawarra region are serviced by three commercial television networks – WIN Television (Nine Network), the Seven Network and Network 10. The Australian Broadcasting Corporation (ABC) and the Special Broadcasting Service (SBS) also broadcast television services to Wollongong. In addition to these channels, ten new channels broadcasting in are also available in Wollongong and the greater Illawarra region. These channels include ABC HD, ABC Kids, ABC Family, ABC Entertains, ABC News, 7HD, 7two, 7mate, 7flix, 7Bravo, 9HD, 9Go!, 9Gem, 9Life, 10 HD, 10 Drama, 10 Comedy. Nickelodeon, SBS HD, SBS2, SBS World Movies, SBS Food, NITV and SBS WorldWatch. In some areas it is also possible to pick up Sydney channels. Subscription Television service Foxtel (formerly Austar) is also available via satellite.

Of the three main commercial networks:

- WIN Television airs a half-hour local WIN News bulletins each weeknight at 5:30pm, produced and broadcast by the Nine Network from the network's headquarters in the city.
- Network 10 (formerly Southern Cross 10) airs short news & weather updates of 10 News throughout the day from Hobart.
- The Seven Network (formerly Prime7 and Prime Television) airs short local news and weather updates of Seven News throughout the day, produced and broadcast from its Canberra studios.

The region receives five ABC radio services – ABC Illawarra 97.3FM, Triple J 98.9, and Radio National 1431 AM, ABC Classic 95.7 and Newsradio 90.9FM. There are two commercial radio stations i98FM 98.1 and WAVE FM 96.5 – formerly 2WL, and two community radio stations Vox FM 106.9 and Christian broadcaster 94.1 FM.

On 17 November 2021 the board game Monopoly launched a 'Wollongong' Edition. It showcases a number of Wollongong attractions including: Nan Tien Temple, Mount Keira, and the Sea Cliff Bridge.

== Transport ==
=== Road ===
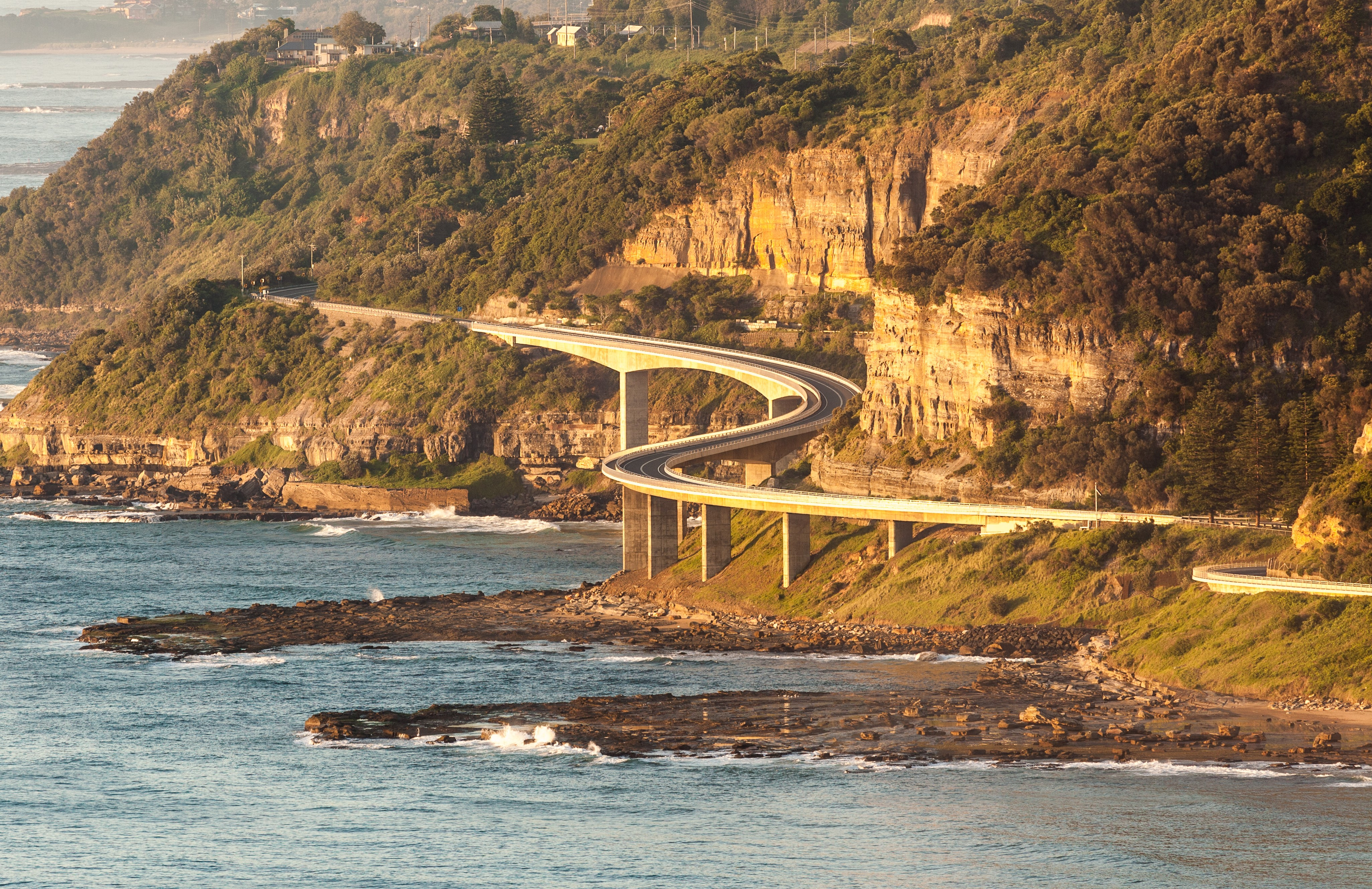
The Sea Cliff Bridge on Lawrence Hargrave Drive bypasses a dangerous section of the Illawarra Escarpment.

The main road connecting Wollongong is the M1 Princes Motorway (formerly the F6). The motorway, part of National Route 1, descends the escarpment via Mount Ousley Road to enter the city near the University of Wollongong and exits at its southern fringe. A second freeway, Memorial Drive (formerly the Northern Distributor), continues northward from the university to connect Wollongong's northern suburbs, Bulli Pass and the scenic Lawrence Hargrave Drive. If one continues up Bulli Pass one will either merge onto The M1 towards Sutherland and Sydney or B69 towards Campbelltown and the rest of Western Sydney. The Illawarra Highway connects Wollongong's southern suburbs to the Southern Highlands via Macquarie Pass.

=== Rail ===
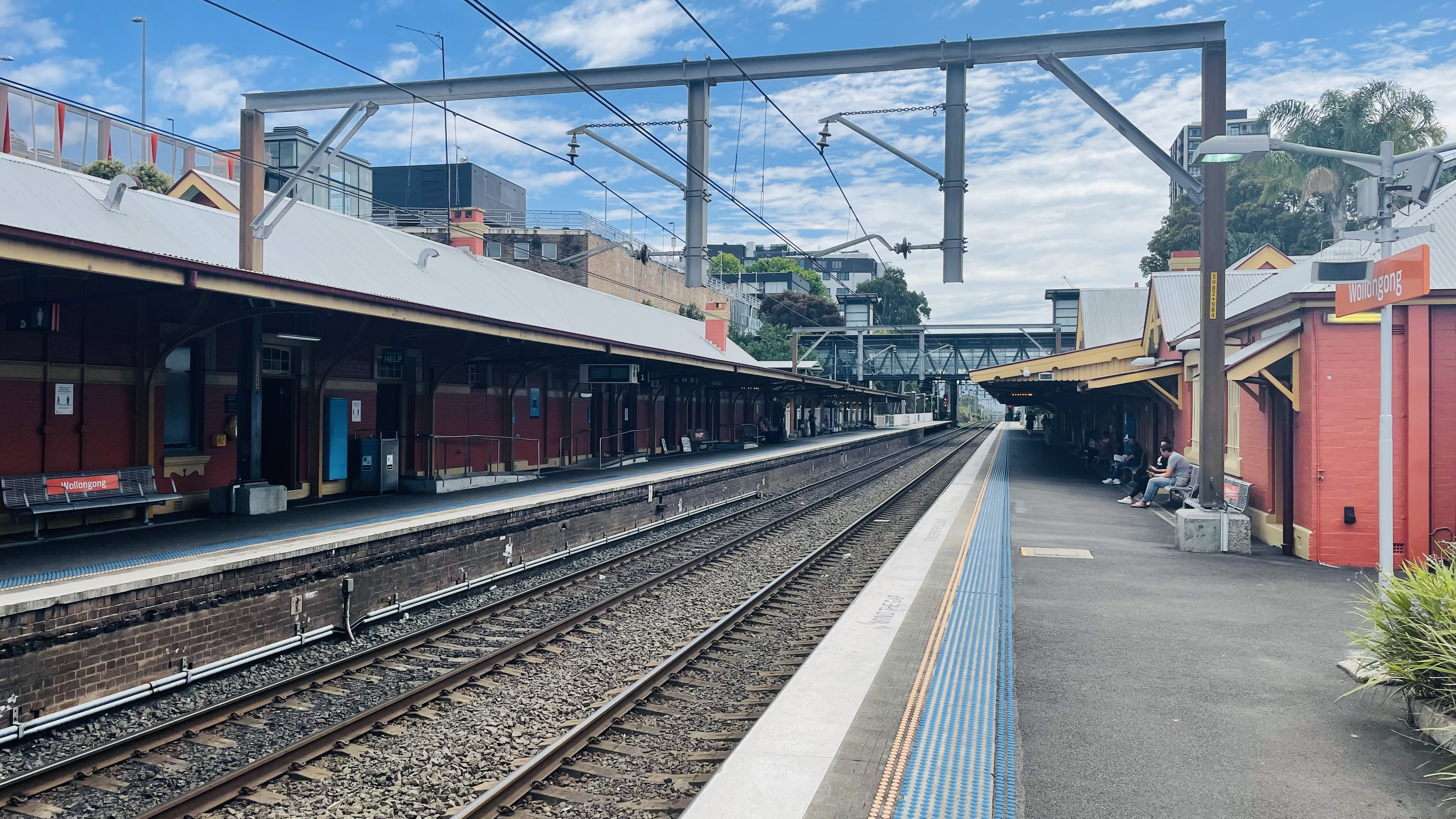
Wollongong railway station

Wollongong is served by the Illawarra railway line. Passenger rail services on this line connect the centres of Nowra and Kiama to the south and Sydney to the north. A branch line connects suburbs between the CBD and Port Kembla. A passenger rail service connecting Wollongong to the Southern Highlands has since been replaced with a coach service. Wollongong railway station is the city's main train station, and serves Wollongong's CBD.

Freight services connect Sydney markets with Port Kembla and the Manildra Group factory at Bomaderry. The Southern Highlands line is used primarily for freight, providing an important bypass for Sydney's congested rail network.

=== Bus ===
Route services in Wollongong are provided by Premier Illawarra and Dion's Bus Service who also provide school/charter services together with some other companies. Wollongong railway station serves as the network's hub. A Bus Interchange is also located near Wollongong University. Services connect Wollongong suburbs to Shellharbour City Centre, Port Kembla, Campbelltown in Western Sydney and the Royal National Park as well as the Southern Highlands . There is also a Free Shuttle Bus service that connects the CBD, university and the suburbs of North Wollongong, Fairy Meadow and Gwynneville which acts as a tram.

=== Air ===
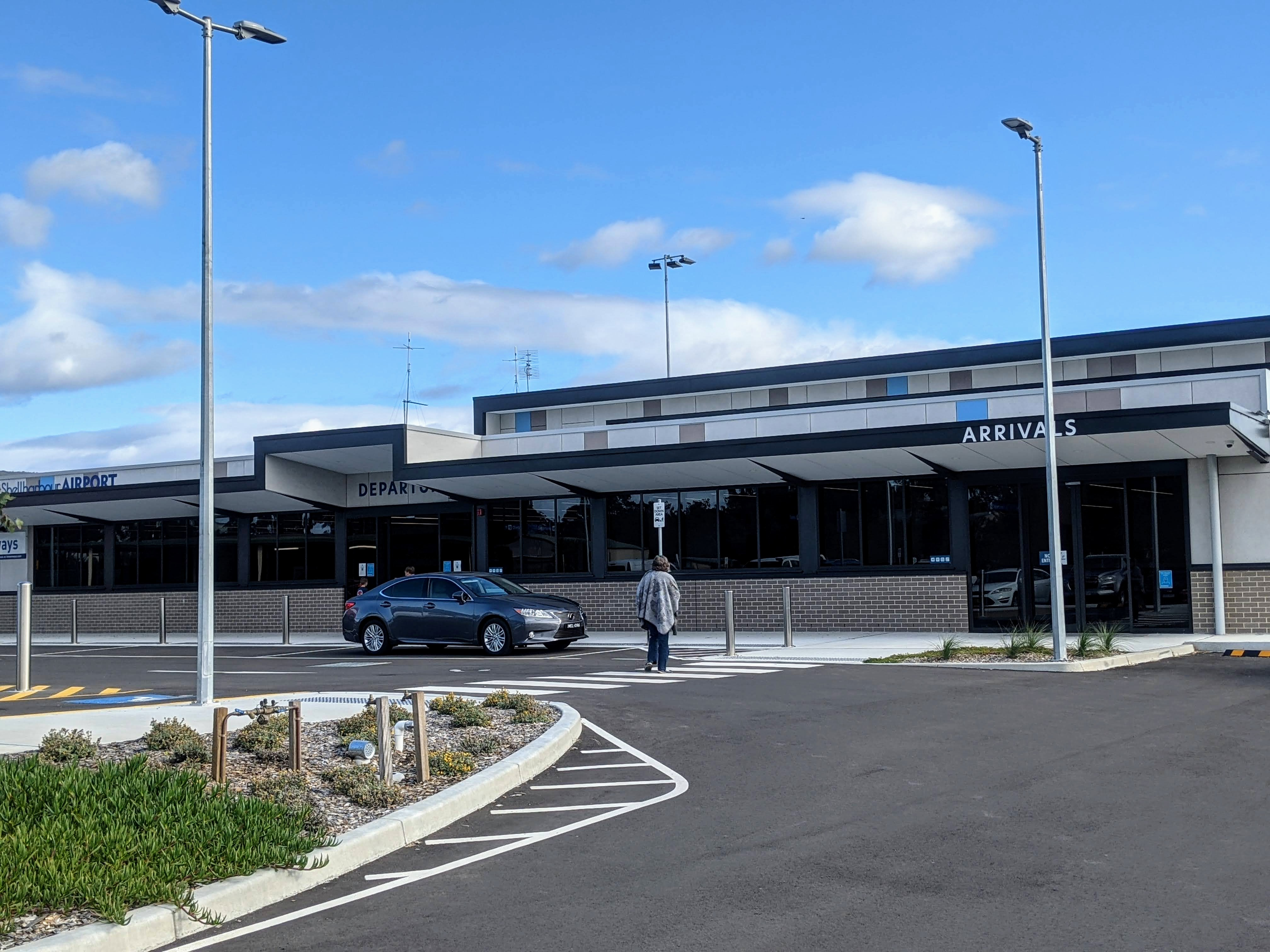
Shellharbour Airport terminal

Wollongong is serviced by Shellharbour Airport, also known as Illawarra Regional Airport and Wollongong Airport. The Airport is located in Albion Park Rail, 18 km south of Wollongong CBD in the Shellharbour City LGA.

Regular Public Transport (RPT) air services to Melbourne (Essendon) and Brisbane airports were recommenced by Fly Corporate in 2018, following the cancellation of previous services offered by JetGo and QantasLink. Fly Corporate operates 34 seat SAAB 340B turboprop aircraft.

There are multiple air charter businesses including NSW Air, EliteJet and Touchdown Helicopters. The Historical Aircraft Restoration Society (HARS) is also based at the airport.

The nearest international airport is Sydney Airport which is located 74 km north of the city.

=== Port ===
Wollongong is served by Port Kembla harbour, which is a major export location for coal mined in the southern and western regions of New South Wales. As part of the state government's plan to divert ships containing automobiles, the port has received significant upgrades and infrastructure including a new Maritime Office and many jobs have been created as the need for port logistics grows. Patrick Corporation holds a contract for integrated port services in the harbour and transports goods by road or rail through its parent company Pacific National.

The port has a range of berths for loading coal, grain, shipping containers and other goods. As of 2020, a gas export terminal is also under development.

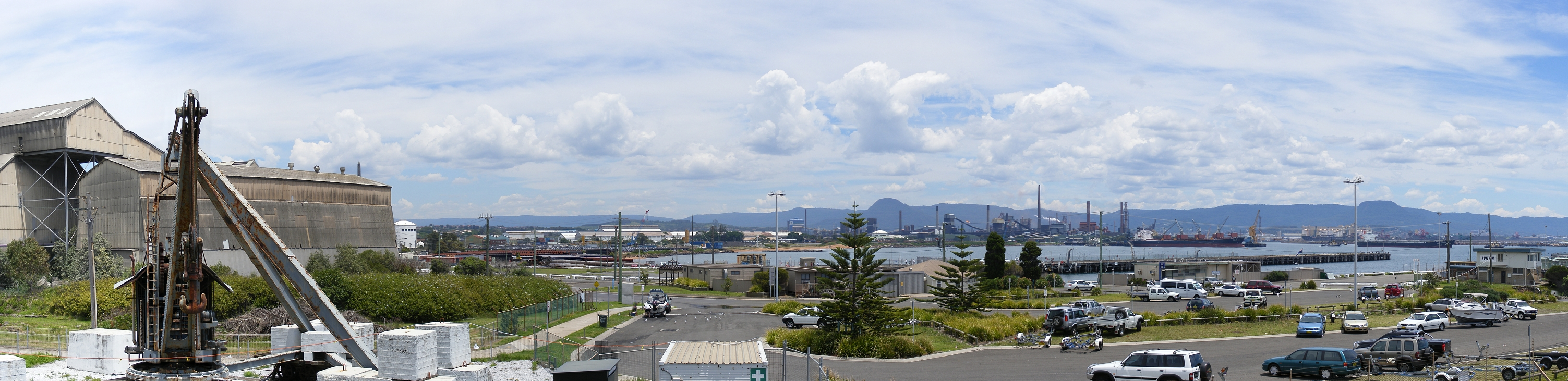
Port Kembla Harbour, taken from Breakwater Battery

Port Kembla was identified by the Australian Defence Department in 2023 as the most likely location to homeport the future Australian nuclear-powered submarines, probably active no earlier than the 2030s.

== Culture ==
=== Arts ===
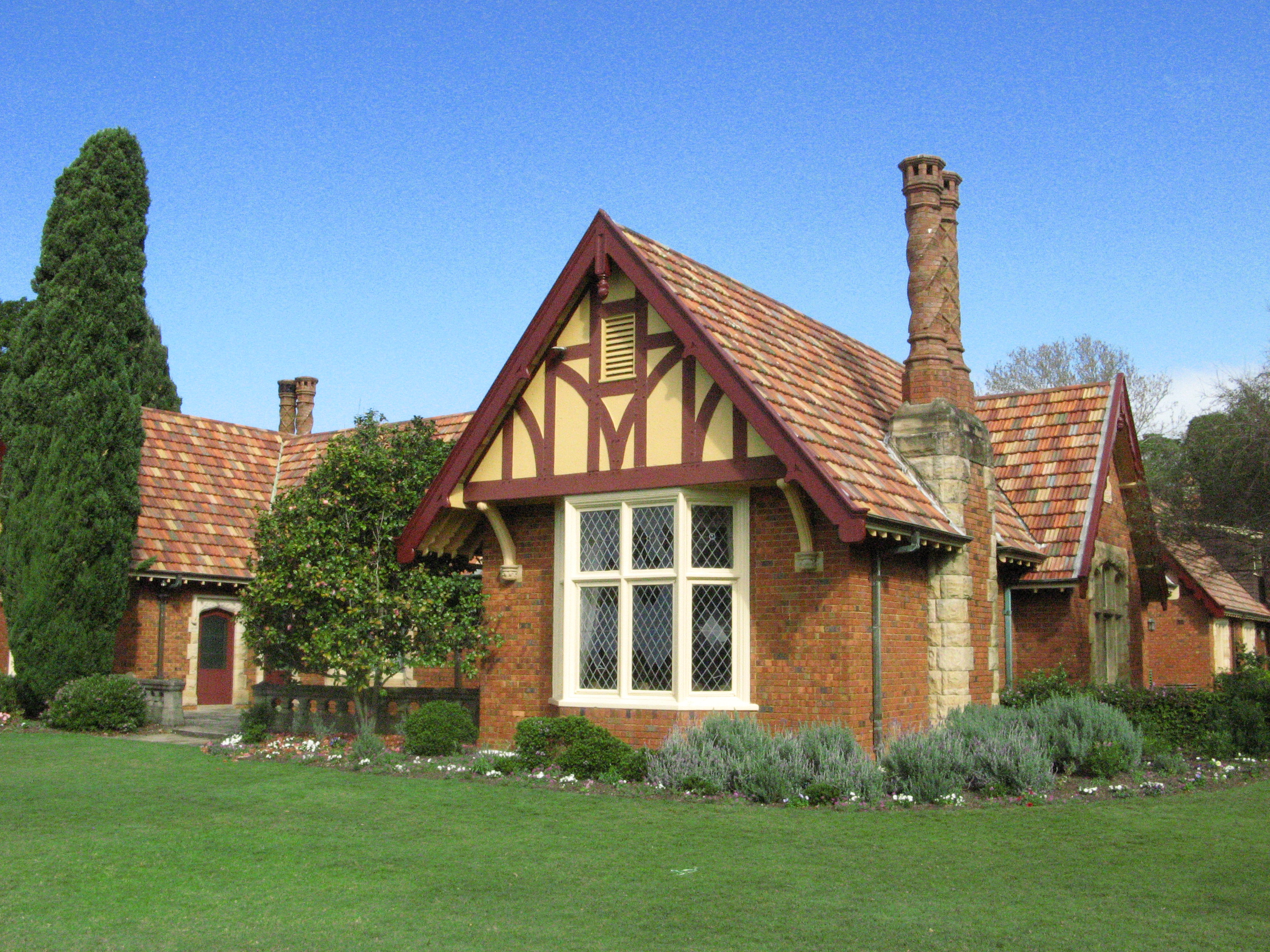
Gleniffer Brae Manor House, home to the Wollongong Conservatorium of Music

Wollongong maintains an active arts scene. In the area of music the city is home to various music and jazz ensembles. The Wollongong Conservatorium of Music provides musical tuition for instruments and voice in classical, jazz and contemporary styles. It is one of the largest regional conservatoriums in Australia and located in the historic Gleniffer Brae Manor House, part of the Wollongong Botanic Gardens.

The local professional theatre company, Merrigong Theatre Company, is located at the Illawarra Performing Arts Centre. Merrigong also manages the city's key civic and community venue, the Wollongong Town Hall, and presents a diverse range of events in the heart of the city. Other local theatre groups include The Arcadians, The Phoenix Theatre and Wollongong Workshop Theatre.

Yours and Owls festival is Wollongong's biggest annual music festival which attracts tens of thousands of people and international performers. The first edition was in 2014. In 2025, it hosted 30,000 people.

The popular 1990s stoner rock band Tumbleweed were formed and based in Wollongong, as are surf rock duo Hockey Dad.

The annual Wollongong Eisteddfod showcases local talent in music, theatre and dance.

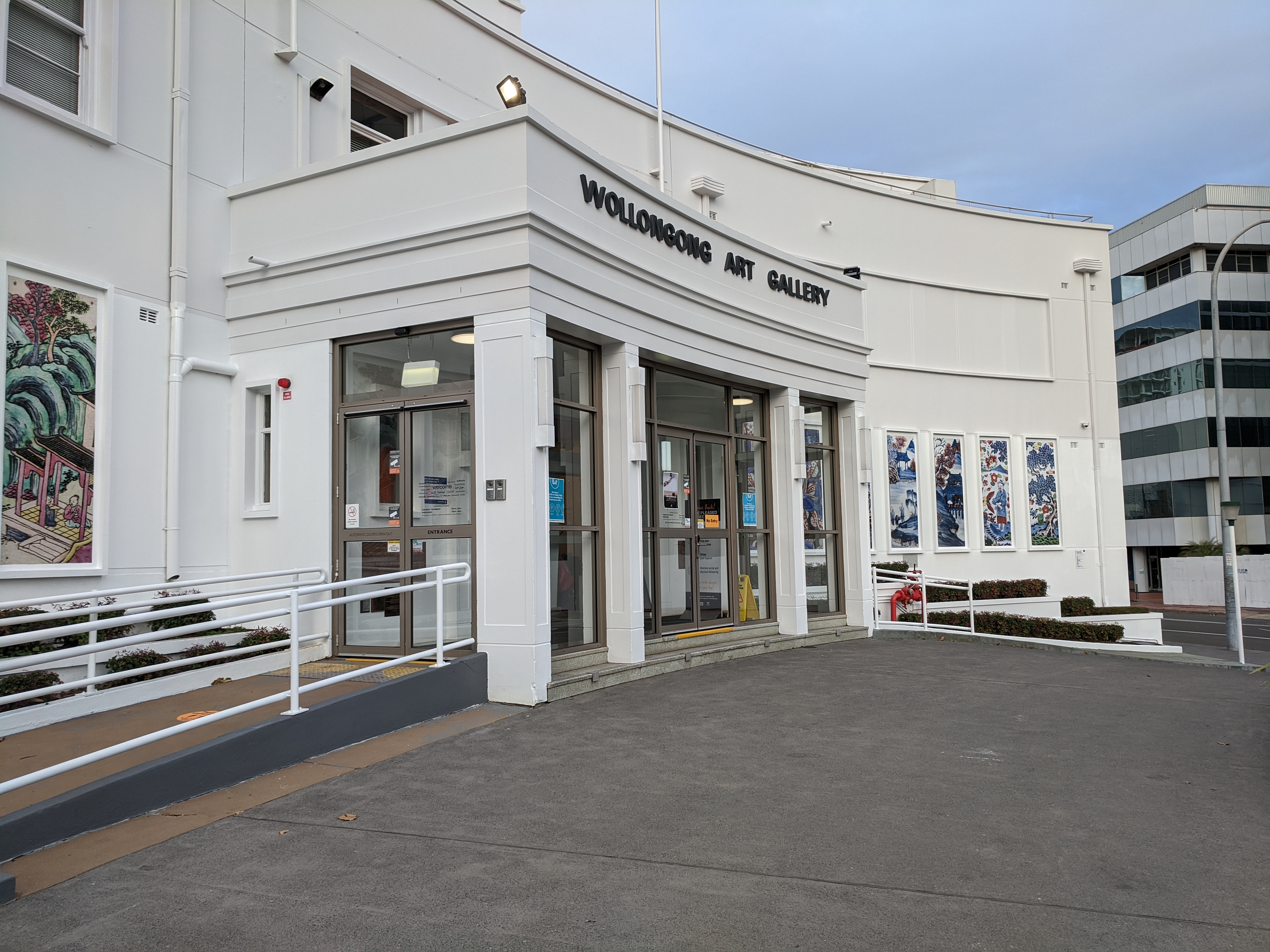
Wollongong Art Gallery

The Wollongong Art Gallery houses a significant collection of the art of the Illawarra, contemporary Australian, Aboriginal and Asian art. Wollongong also hosts Wonderwalls, an annual street art festival featuring local and internationally acclaimed street artists.

Cyrus Villanueva, winner of the seventh season of The X Factor Australia, was born and raised in Wollongong.

=== Entertainment and nightlife ===
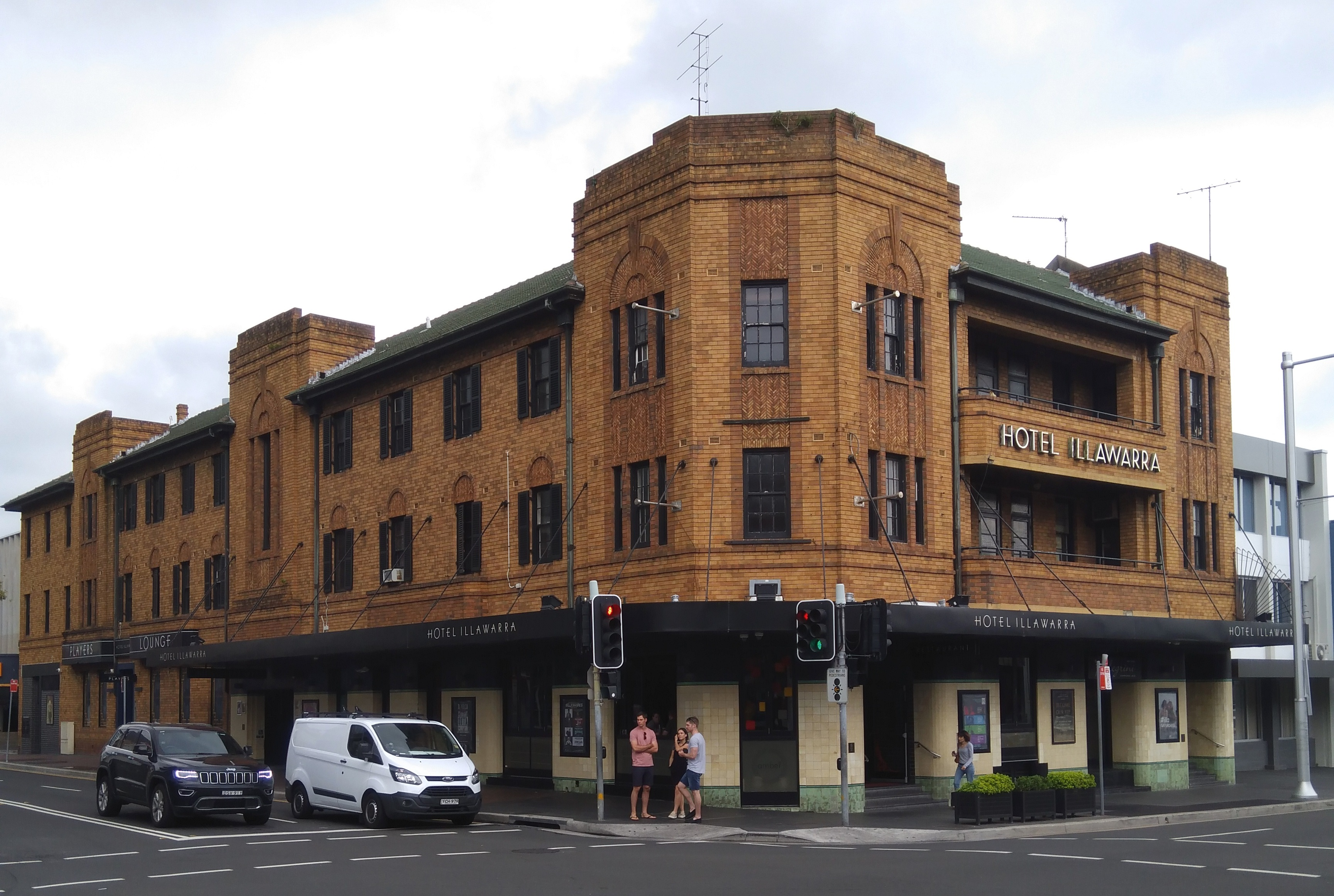
Hotel Illawarra

Entertainment venues include the Crown Street Mall, many restaurants and cafes, the town cinemas and the Illawarra Performing Arts Centre. Adjacent to WIN Stadium, the home ground of the NRL team St. George Illawarra Dragons, is the WIN Entertainment Centre (WEC), a multipurpose venue which hosts concerts and sporting events (including Southern Stars, basketball and motocross stunt shows).

The WIN Entertainment Centre has hosted world-renowned performers including Lady Gaga, Ed Sheeran, Guy Sebastian, Anastacia, John Farnham, Keith Urban, Tina Arena, Pink, Jimmy Barnes, Bryan Adams, John Mayer, Delta Goodrem, the Veronicas, Alanis Morissette, the Script, X Ambassadors, Cher, Cyndi Lauper, Billy Ocean, Kelly Clarkson, Jack Johnson, Disney on Ice, and the Wiggles.

Even though the WEC is the biggest venue in Wollongong, many popular singers have performed in other venues in the Wollongong area such as Anita's Theatre in Thirroul and Waves in Towradgi. Famous artists that have performed in Wollongong include Charli XCX, Tones and I, Troye Sivan, Keith Urban, The Goo Goo Dolls, Tame Impala, Richy Mitch & the Coal Miners, Guns N' Roses, Boney M., Vance Joy, Alicia Keys, Kip Moore, Lime Cordiale, Belinda Carlisle, Jayda G, Isabel LaRosa, Sheppard, Denzel Curry, Rita Ora, Tyga, Cyril, Fontaines D.C., Pnau, Vengaboys, the Veronicas, Leon Bridges, Declan McKenna, Ty Dolla Sign, Missy Higgins, and Elton John. There are numerous city nightclubs, pubs and registered clubs. The 80-capacity Rad Bar in Crown Street was considered one of the most iconic live music venues in the Illawarra until it closed in 2019. Most suburbs also have their own hotels, each with individual character.

=== Recreation ===
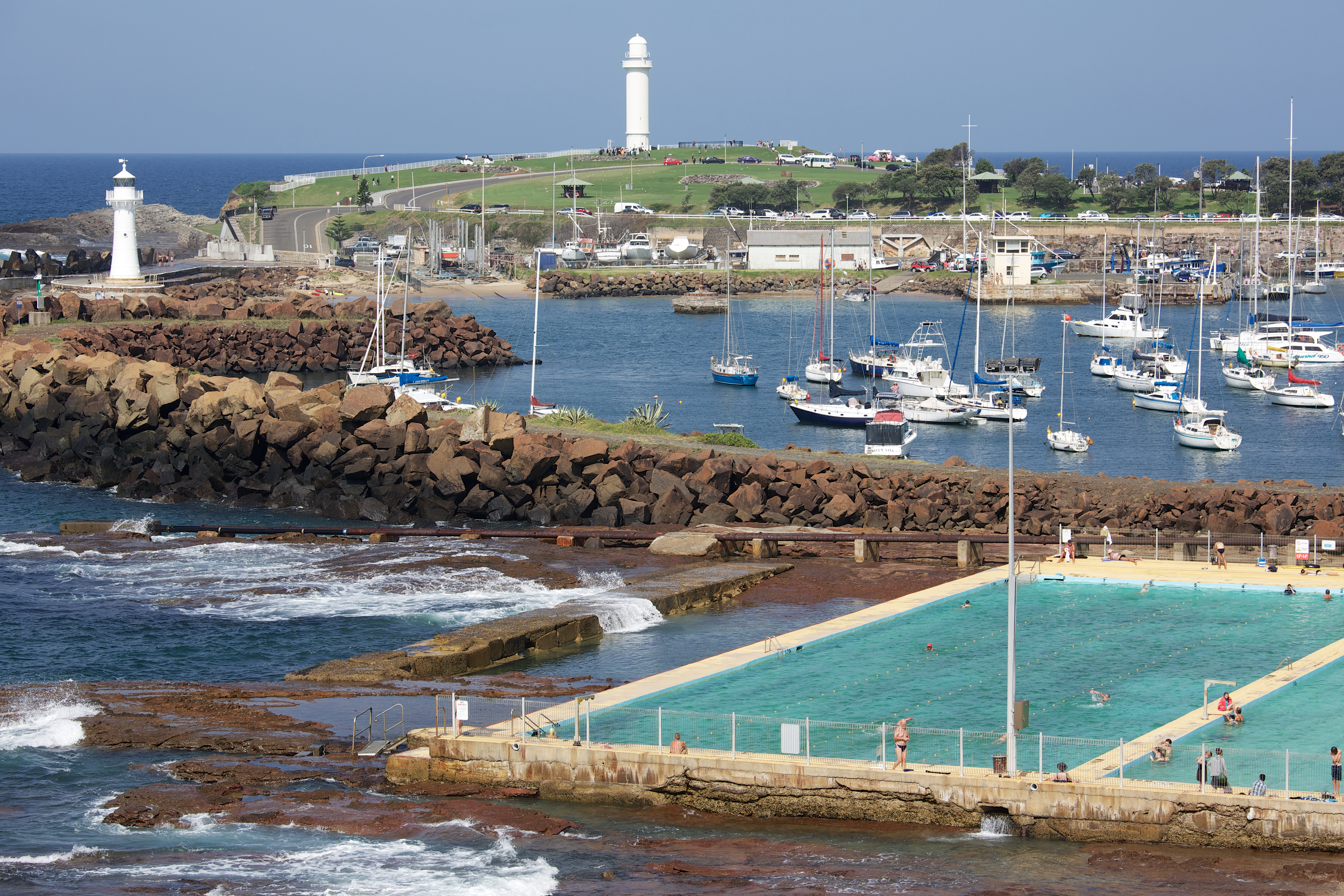
Ocean baths on the coastline

Wollongong has 17 seasonally-patrolled local beaches: Stanwell Park, Coalcliff, Scarborough/Wombarra, Coledale, Austinmer, Thirroul, Sandon Point, Bulli, Woonona, Bellambi, Corrimal, Towradgi, Fairy Meadow, North Wollongong, Wollongong City, Port Kembla and Windang. Surfing, rock fishing, swimming, skimboarding are common activities. The Wollongong to Thirroul Bike Track, a thirteen kilometre Heart Foundation walking/biking pathway which runs northwards adjacent to the Illawarra coastline starting at Wollongong Beach, is frequented by walkers, joggers, skaters and bicycle riders. Bushwalking on nearby Mount Keira and Mount Kembla, and motorbike riding at the Motocross Track on the escarpment west of Wollongong, are also popular activities.

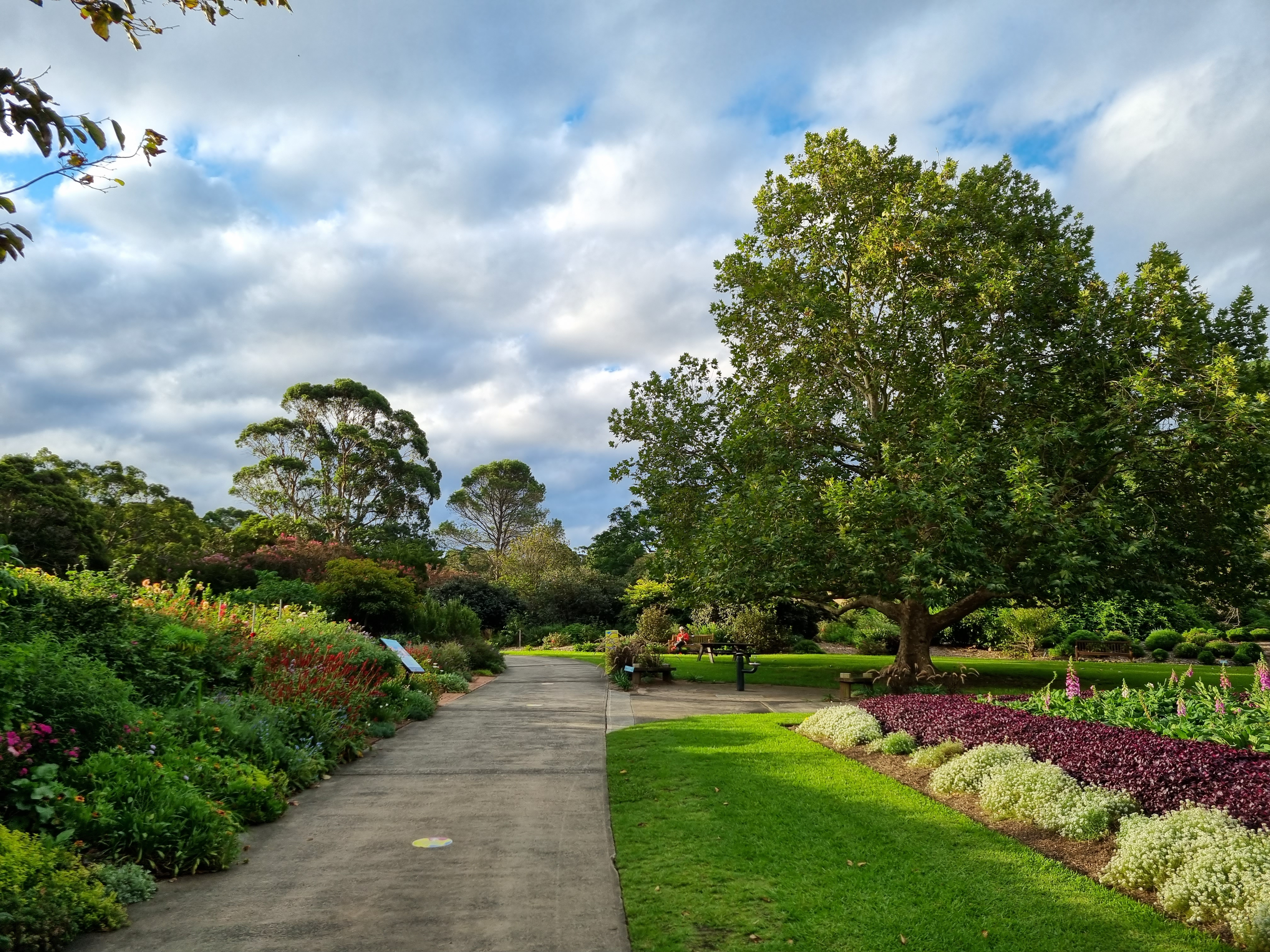
Wollongong Botanic Garden

Wollongong has many parks. In the city centre is MacCabe Park, featuring a playground, the local youth centre, a war memorial, community hall, a sculpture called "Nike" and a brick amphitheatre. Lang Park, adjacent to the city beach, has a number of shelters built in the 1950s. These were subject for demolition but were saved by a community vote. Stuart Park, to the coastal north of the city but south of Fairy Lagoon and Puckeys Estate Reserve, is well known as a landing spot for skydivers as well as a place for outdoor recreation and social gatherings. Stuart Park is also distinctive for its Norfolk Island Pines, planted during the North Wollongong tourism boom in the 1920s. J. J. Kelly Park to the south is used by circuses, as well as a protected area of creek leading to the Greenhouse Park north of the Port Kembla Steelworks, containing a revegetated area of once waste and a lookout, as well as the small remnants of Tom Thumb Lagoon, which once stretched north to Swan Street. Beaton Park in Gwynneville is home to Tennis Wollongong and the Leisure Centre with an athletics complex, indoor heated swimming pool, gymnasium and multipurpose sports hall.

== Sport ==
Wollongong is home to two professional sports teams, the St. George Illawarra Dragons of the National Rugby League and the Illawarra Hawks of the National Basketball League.

=== Rugby league ===
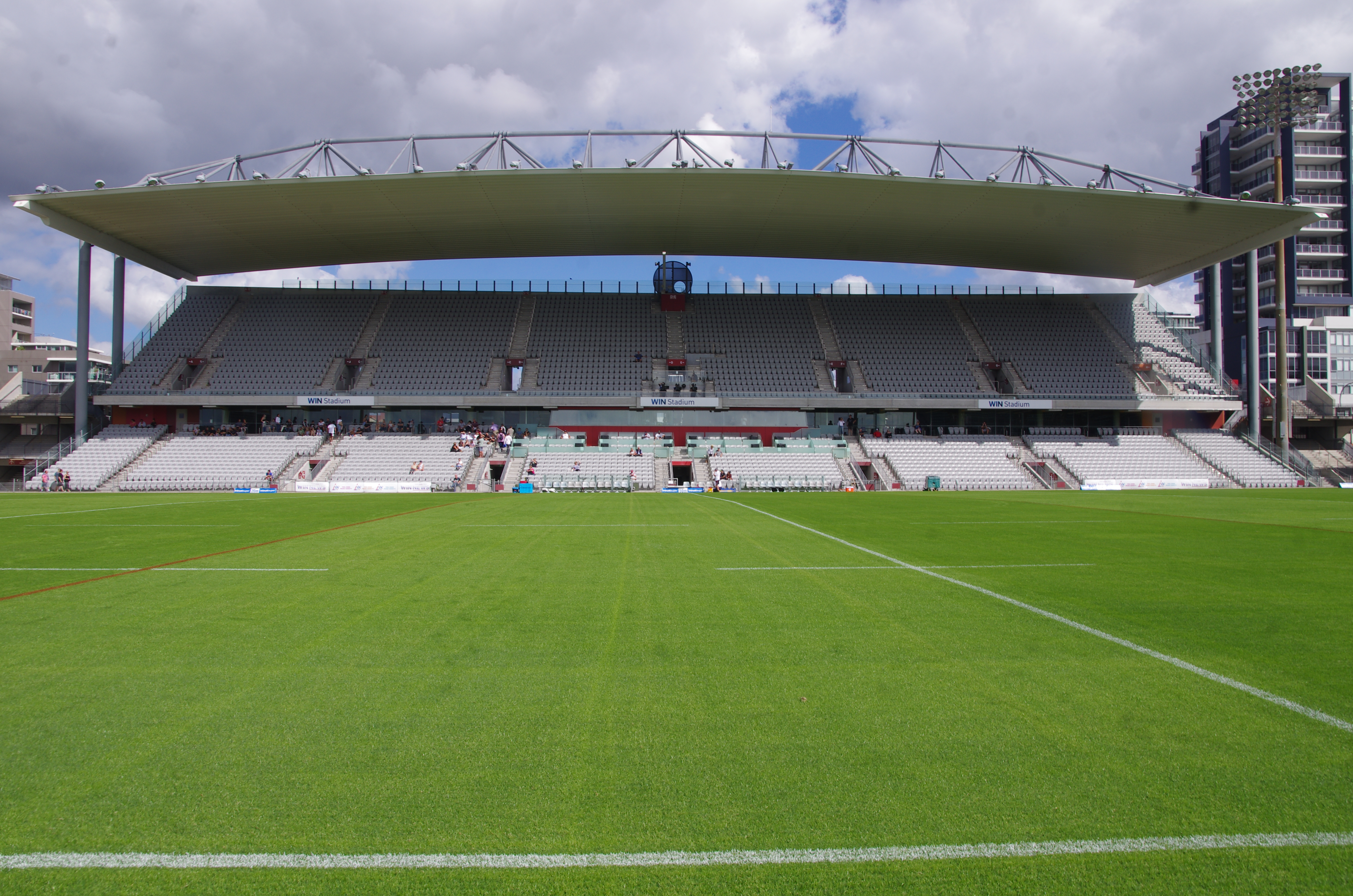
WIN stadium, one of two home grounds used by the St. George Illawarra Dragons.

The most popular sport in Wollongong is rugby league. The St. George Illawarra Dragons rugby league club represents the city in the National Rugby League (NRL) competition. The club was formed in a merger between the St. George Dragons and the Illawarra Steelers in 1999, and they play half their home games at WIN Stadium in Downtown Wollongong. They won the 2010 NRL Grand Final against the Sydney Roosters.

Prior to the merger the Illawarra Steelers had represented the area in the New South Wales Rugby League premiership and NRL between 1982 and 1998. The Illawarra Steelers continue to represent the Illawarra region in all four NSWRL Junior Representative Competitions: the SG Ball Cup, Harold Matthews Cup, Tarsha Gale Cup, and the Lisa Fiaola Cup.

Rugby League has been played in Wollongong since 1911, and the area has produced at least 41 international players. At the local level league continues to have a strong following with a number of teams playing in the Illawarra Rugby League and Group 7 Rugby League competitions. The Illawarra League features 14 senior clubs north of Lake Illawarra, and 5 of Group 7's clubs are located in the Wollongong urban area around the Shellharbour district.

=== Basketball ===
The Illawarra Hawks basketball team play in the National Basketball League and are the only NBL club to have competed in every season since the league's inception in 1979. Home games are played at the WIN Entertainment Centre, nicknamed as "The Sandpit" in the NBL due to its close proximity to the beach. This makes the Hawks the only professional sports team to play all home games in the Illawarra. The Hawks won the 2001 NBL Championship.

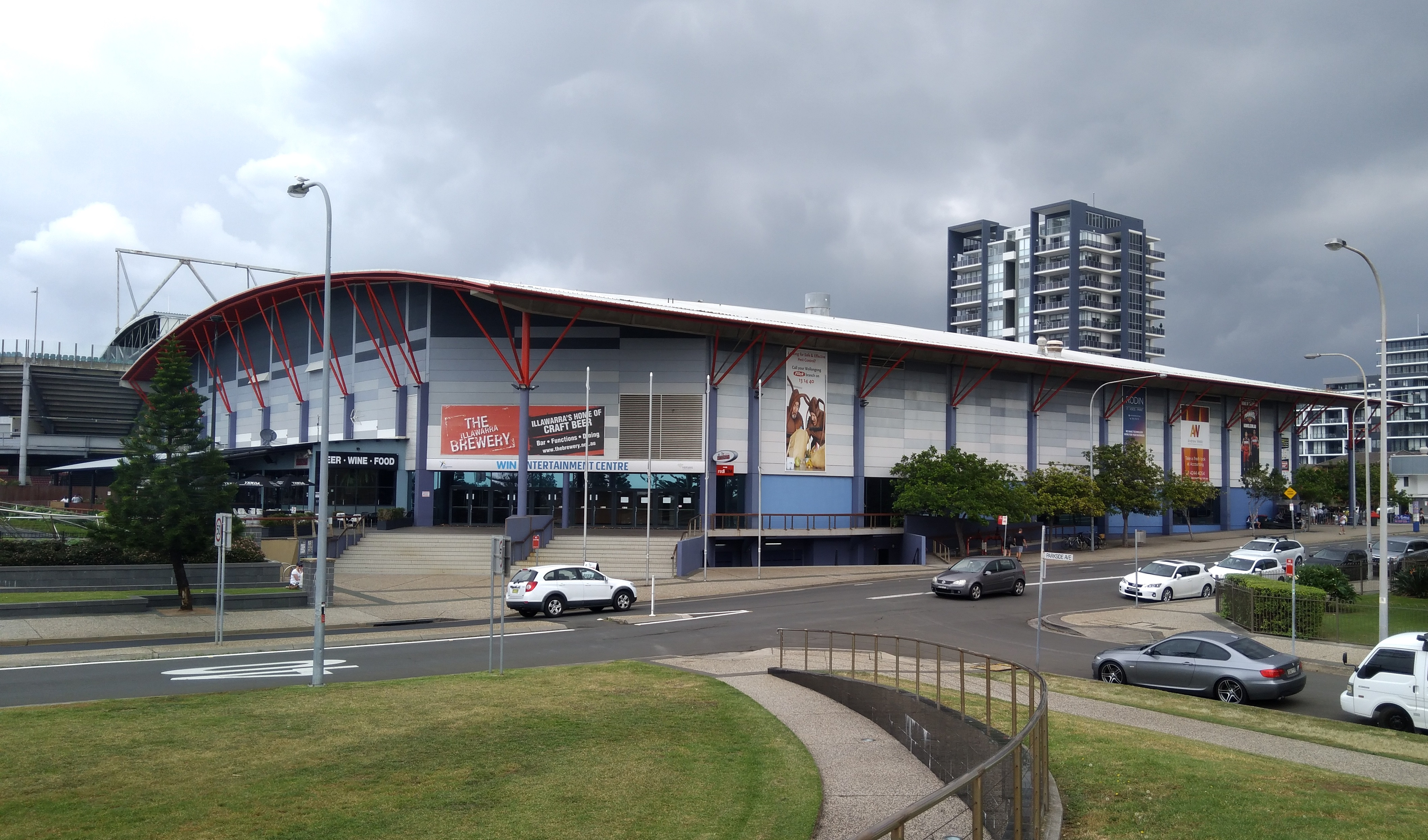
WIN Entertainment Centre

In addition to the NBL side, local community basketball competitions are run by Basketball Illawarra. Basketball Illawarra's representative side, also called the Illawarra Hawks, compete in the Basketball NSW competition, the Waratah League.

=== Horse Racing ===
Wollongong is home to the Illawarra Turf Club, who hosts the $1 million The Gong at the Kembla Grange Racecourse each November. Introduced in 2019 as part of the expanded New South Wales spring racing carnival, the 1600-metre quality handicap attracts a competitive field and more than 5,000 spectators annually. It is the feature race at Kembla Grange's standalone metropolitan Saturday meeting and was elevated to Group 3 status in 2024. The Club also hosts the Group 3 Kembla Grange Classic each March.

=== Soccer ===
Wollongong Wolves compete in the National Premier Leagues NSW, the second-tier of soccer in Australia. In late 2008, the club folded due to debts incurred over the past season, but was rescued financially by community support, and as a community-owned not-for-profit organisation has been successful in competitions. A consortium named Great South Socceris preparing the Illawarra's South Coast A-League bid. Scott Chipperfield, a Wollongong native who became a professional football player in Europe, has expressed an interest in being involved in a Wollongong Soccerclub playing in the A-League. It is proposed that a new community-based entity would then take on their Soccer NSW licence. Illawarra Stingrays compete in the National Premier Leagues Women's, the second tier of Women's soccer in Australia.

=== Other sports ===
The city does not have a senior cricket team representing it, however there are two strong local competitions; Cricket Illawarra and Cricket South Coast. Ireland captain Trent Johnston grew up in Dapto and played for New South Wales before leaving for Ireland. Australian internationals and New South Wales players Brett Lee and Shane Lee were raised in Oak Flats and played for the local cricket club Oak Flat Rats.

The Illawarriors are a rugby union club based in the Illawarra, who contest the Shute Shield NSW club competition. The club play some of their home games at WIN Stadium. Local rugby union is played in the Illawarra Rugby Union.

The Wollongong Lions is an Australian rules football club that competes in the AFL South Coast competition. The club is based at North Dalton Park.

The first recorded match of water polo in Wollongong came in 1894, in a men's match between the Wollongong and Kiama Swim Clubs at Brighton Beach. The Kiama Swim Club prevailed, winning 3–0. Water polo is currently played at UOW Pool through the Illawarra Water Polo Club. Each year, Illawarra also compete at the NSW Country Club Championships, whereby the Illawarra U14's boys won in 2021.

The Illawarra Cycling Club holds road cycle races almost every week of the year. During the summer, velodrome racing is also promoted at the Unanderra Velodrome on the Princes Highway. A recent focus within the club has seen a shift to encompass a stronger emphasis on youth development programs alongside its already strong commitment to competitive under 19's, 23's and adult road racing. The club is represented at a state and national level regularly and has had several riders compete at international levels.

The Wollongong Whales compete against Bondi Icebergs Winter Swimming Club, South Maroubra Dolphins Winter Swimming Club, Cronulla Polar Bears Winter Swimming Club, Maroubra Seals Winter Swimming Club, Coolangatta Surf Life Saving Club, Clovelly Eskimos Winter Swimming Club, Bronte Splashers, Coogee Penguins Winter Swimming Club and Cottesloe Crabs in the Winter Swimming Association of Australia Championships.

In the book Quidditch Through the Ages by J. K. Rowling, the Wollongong Warriors are listed as one of Australia's quidditch teams. They have a rivalry with the Thundelarra Thunderers, and are the inventors of the Wollongong Shimmy, a high-speed zig-zag move designed to confuse and distract opposing Chasers. Wollongong Warriors were a real club in Quidditch Australia (now Quadball Australia), a quidditch league.

Wollongong hosted the UCI Road World Championships in 2022.

== Attractions ==
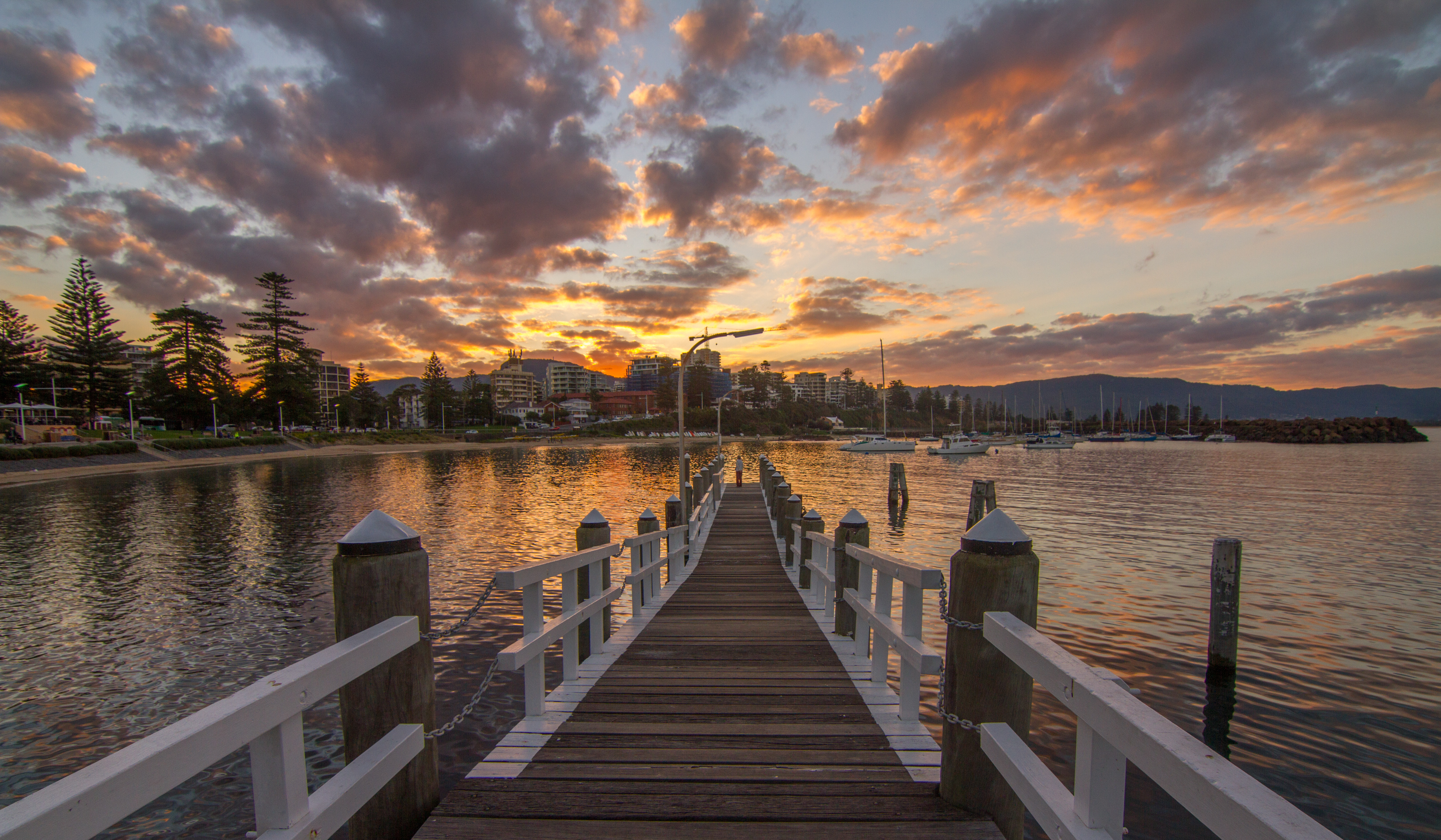
Pier at the Wollongong Foreshore Park

In addition to numerous swimming, skate spots and surfing beaches, major visitor attractions to Wollongong City include:

- Wollongong Botanic Gardens
- Cycling to Sandon Point from North Wollongong
- Wollongong Harbour (Belmore Basin), Wollongong Breakwater Lighthouse, Wollongong Head Lighthouse and surrounding foreshores
- Illawarra Light Railway Museum, with light and miniature train rides
- Illawarra Museum
- Wollongong Town Hall
- Wollongong City Library
- Wollongong Art Gallery
- Bulli Tops (Sublime Point), Mount Keira, Port Kembla (Illowra Battery), Illawarra Fly Tree Top Walk
- Nan Tien Temple
- Hill 60 Port Kembla
- Fisherman's Beach
- Science Centre and Planetarium
- WIN Stadium
- Kembla Grange Racecourse

== Sister and friendship cities ==
Wollongong has sister city and friendship city arrangements with:

- Kawasaki, Japan, formally established 1988.
- Ohrid, North Macedonia, established 1981, formalised in 1999.
- Longyan, China (friendship city), formally established 2001.
- Nova Scotia, Canada, lifeguard exchange program for more than 25 years.
- Carrathool, New South Wales, inter-council friendship agreement since 2008.

== See also ==
- List of Wollongong suburbs
- Norman Gunston and Aunty Jack Sings Wollongong
- HMAS Wollongong
- Newcastle
- Geelong
