= Orpen =

Orpen, and its variant spelling Orpin, is an Anglo-Norman surname derived from "Erpen", perhabs itself a Teutonic cognate of Old English earp ("dark, dusky, swarthy") and the French diminutive suffix -in.

Notable people with the name include:

- Abe Orpen (1854–1937), Canadian businessman
- Abram Orpen Moriarty (1830–1918), Australian politician
- Adela Orpen (1855–1927), Irish writer
- Arthur Orpen Herbert (1831–1890), Second commissioner of Queensland Rail in Australia
- Bea Orpen (1913–1980), Irish painter
- Charles Orpen (1791–1856), Irish physician, founded deaf school
- Edward Orpen Moriarty (1822–1896), Australian civil engineer
- Edward Richards-Orpen (1884–1967), Irish politician, agriculturalist and conservationist
- Francis Orpen Morris (1810–1893), Irish clergyman
- Frederick Orpen Bower (1855–1948), English botanist
- Giles Orpen-Smellie, British police and crime commissioner
- Goddard Henry Orpen (1852–1932), Irish historian
- John Orpen (1868–1950), Anglican priest
- Joseph Orpen (1828–1923), British colonial administrator
- Joshua Orpin (born 1994), Australian actor
- Raymond Orpen (1837–1930), Irish Anglican bishop
- Rebecca Dulcibella Orpen (1829 or 1830–1923), British painter
- Richard Orpen (1863–1938), Irish architect and painter
- William Orpen (1878–1931), Irish artist
