= Wollongong Harbour Precinct =

Harbour precinct in Wollongong, New South Wales

Wollongong Boat Harbour Precinct
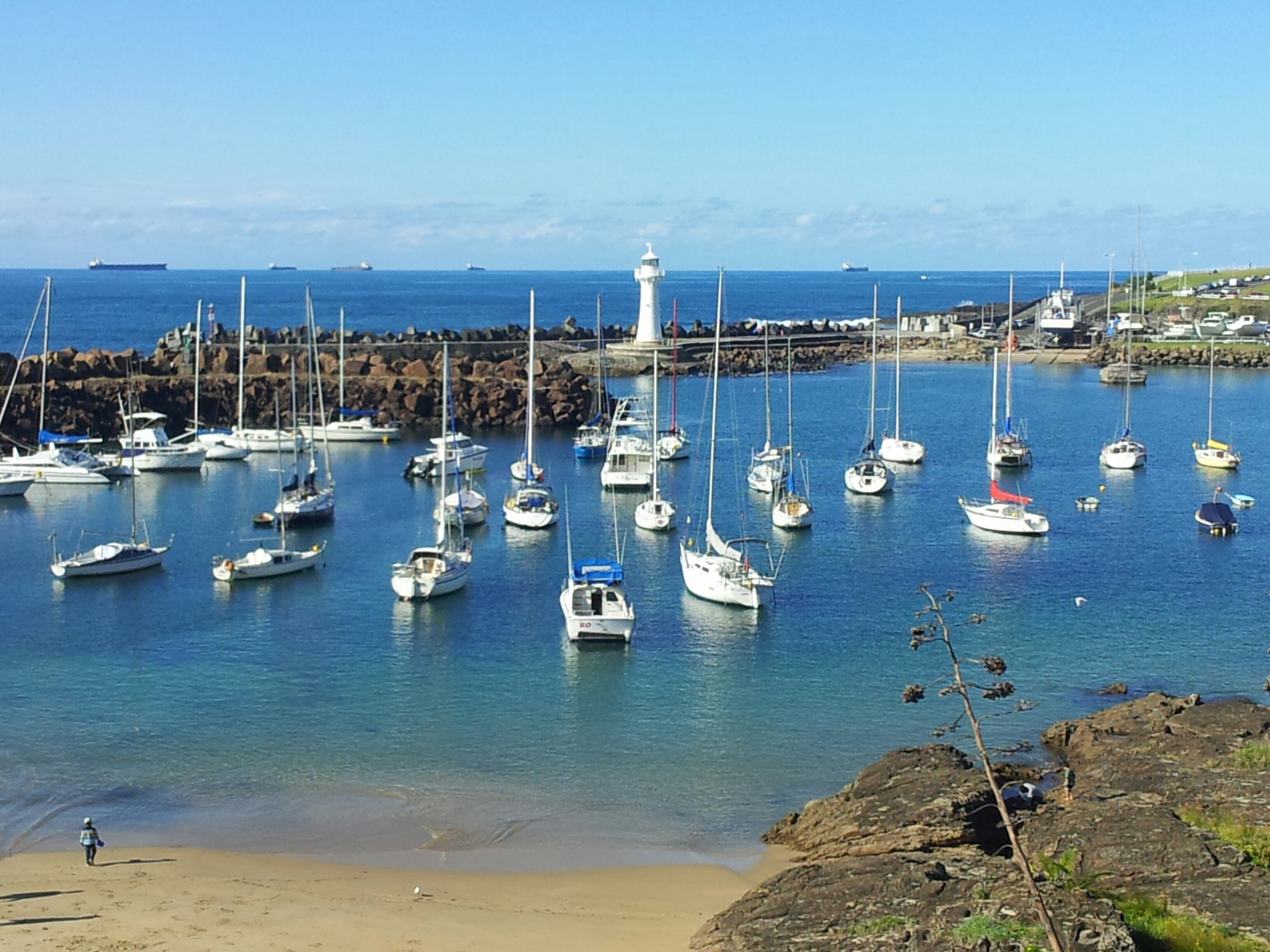
- Wollongong Harbour, 2012

- Location within New South Wales Location within Australia
- 34.4212°S 150.9081°E
- Location: Cliff Road and Endeavour Drive, Wollongong, City of Wollongong, New South Wales, Australia

History
- Built: 1837–

Site notes
- Owner: Department of Trade & Investment, Regional Infrastructure & Services

New South Wales Heritage Register
- Official name: Wollongong Harbour Precinct; Belmore Basin; Government Dam; Government Basin; Stockade Point; Flagstaff Hill; Signal Hill; Brighton Beach; Boat Harbour; Fortress Hill
- Type: state heritage (landscape)
- Designated: 5 May 2010
- Reference no.: 1823
- Type: Port facility
- Category: Urban Area

Wollongong Harbour Precinct is a heritage-listed shipping harbour at Cliff Road and Endeavour Drive, in Wollongong, New South Wales, Australia. It was built in 1837. The historic precinct includes Belmore Basin, Government Dam, Government Basin, Stockade Point, Flagstaff Hill, Signal Hill, Brighton Beach, Boat Harbour and Fortress Hill. It was added to the New South Wales State Heritage Register on 5 May 2010.

== History ==
=== Pre-European ===
Prior to European occupation of the Illawarra, Wollongong Harbour and coastline was used by the Dharawal people as a natural harbour and sheltered area for all manner of cultural and ceremonial activities for more than 20,000 years and possibly as many as 40,000 years. The natural bay was protected from direct ocean currents and south-easterly winds by the sand dunes and Flagstaff Hill. Smiths Creek provided fresh water and there was an abundance of food from the combined marine and riparian environment. Archaeological evidence of this extended occupation by the Aboriginal people is found in extensive middens in the area.

=== European settlement ===
European occupation dates from 1815 when Dr. Charles Throsby and his stockman herded cattle from Glenfield via Appin and down the escarpment at Bulli and established grazing grounds near the present Harbour. John Oxley surveyed the area in 1816 and land grantees were allowed to make selections in that year.

From the 1820s, the area now known as Brighton Beach was used as the shipping point for the newly settled area. Vessels would stand off from the beach and shipments of supplies and produce and timber destined for the Sydney market would be transferred by small flat bottomed boats or floated out.

In 1829, the regiment that had been stationed at Red Point, south of the present day Port Kembla, was relocated to the Boat Harbour at Brighton Beach together with the convicts under their command. The construction of government buildings, barracks to accommodate the soldiers, a residence for the commandant and a stockade for the convicts adjacent to the harbour marks the establishment of this area as the main commercial, judicial and administrative centre for Wollongong.

Following a visit to the Illawarra in April 1834,Governor Bourke proclaimed the town of Wollongong as surveyed by the Surveyor General of New South Wales Major Thomas Mitchell.

=== Proposal and building of harbour ===
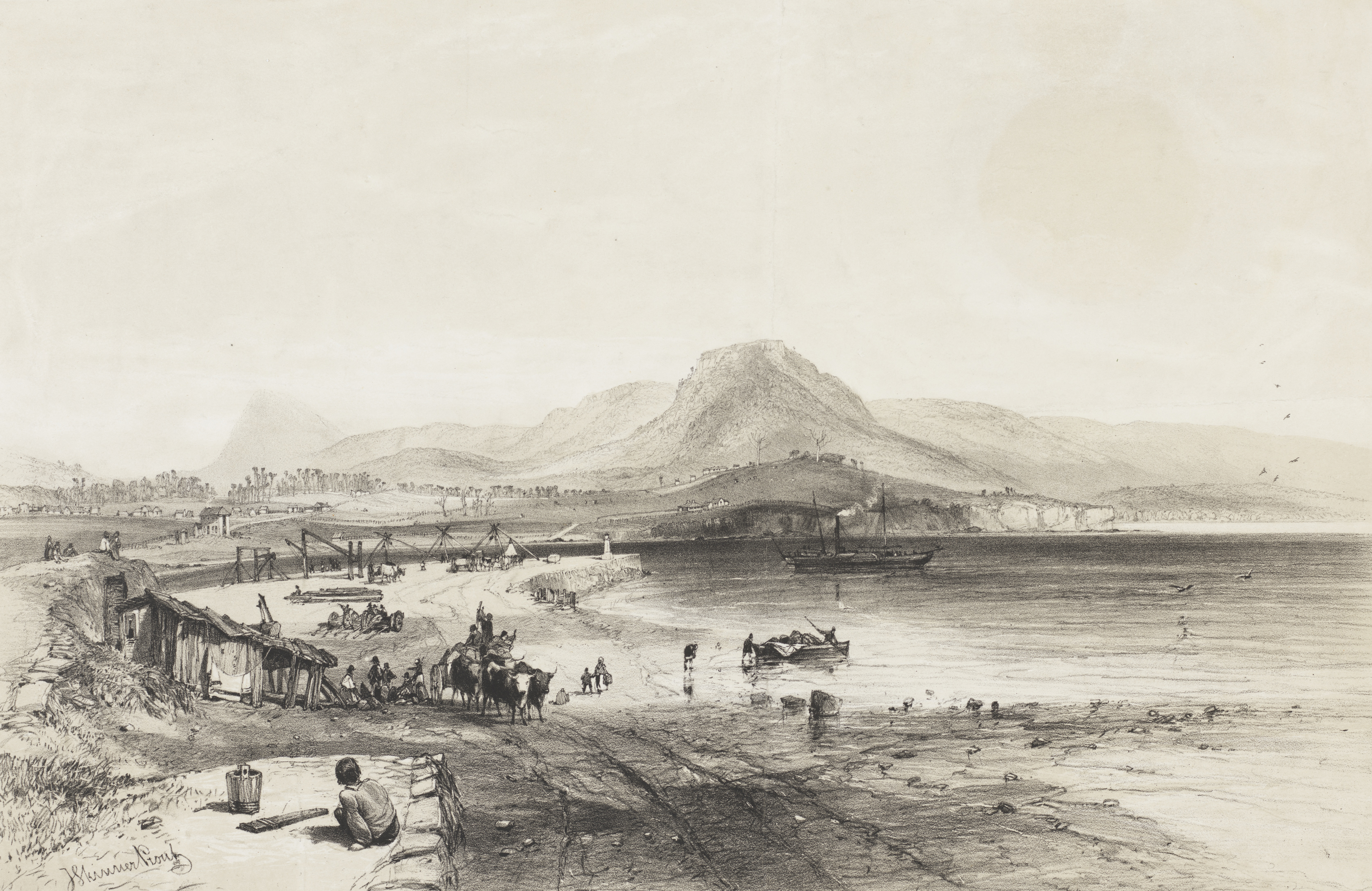
View of Wollongong, New South Wales, c. 1843

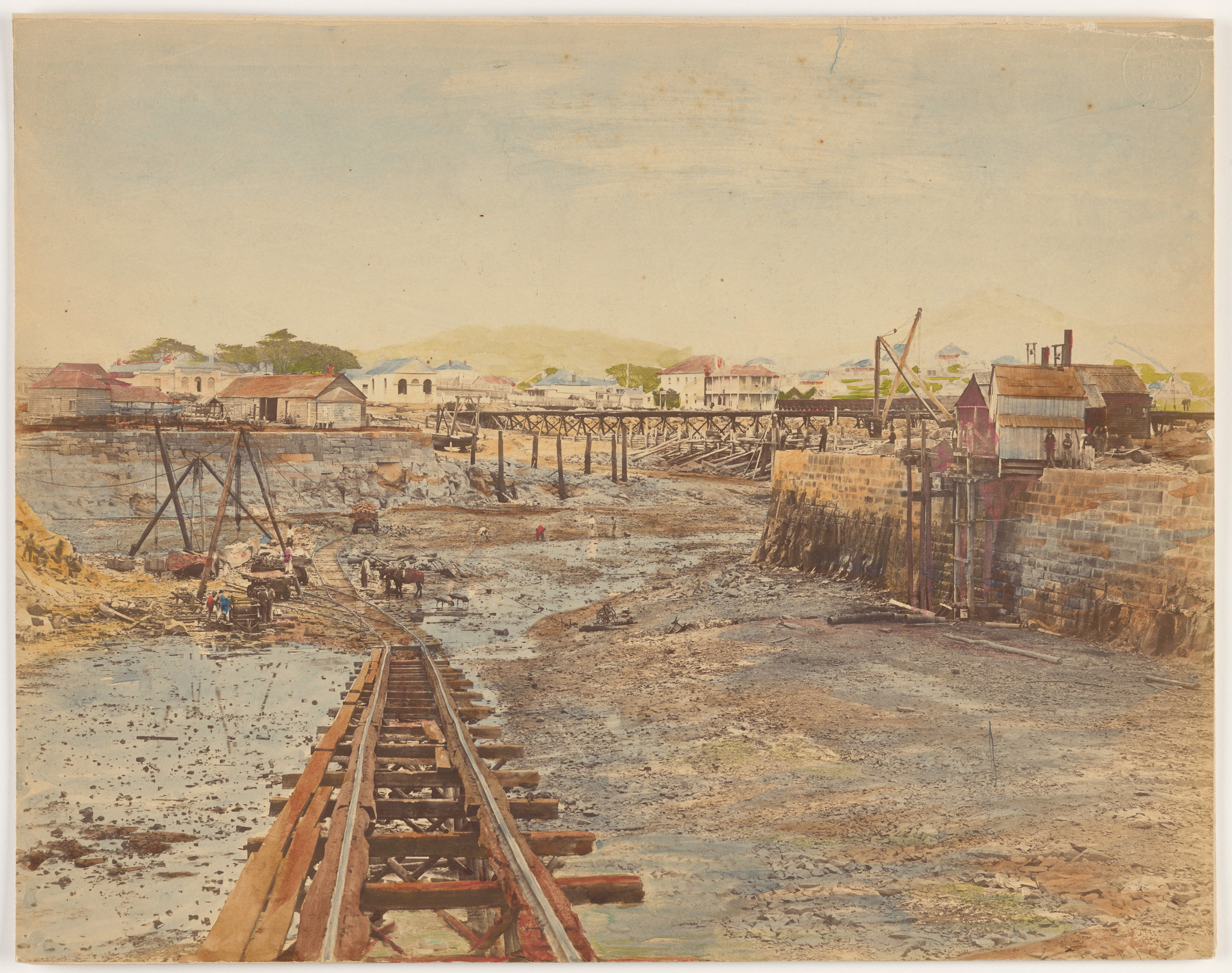
Belmore Basin, extension to Wollongong Harbour, 1868

The 1835 Mitchell plan proposed the construction of a harbour for the protection of the small boats that provisioned the garrison. Mitchell proposed convict labour be used to lessen construction costs. Mitchell's plan also included a breakwater that extended in a straight line from Wollongong Headland. There is no evidence that this breakwater was started.

In 1837, Governor Bourke instructed the Colonial Engineer Captain George Barney of the Royal Engineers to design and oversee the construction of a harbour at Wollongong. Barney's design was for a basin 100 foot long, 35 feet wide and 8 feet deep at low tide with a stone pier that incorporated a slipway for the Pilot Boat on the northern side at the sheltered end of Boat Harbour. The excavation was to be carried out by drilling and blasting behind a cofferdam. After construction commenced in 1837, it was reported in 1841 that the size of the basin was to be increased to 300 feet long and 150 feet wide. The work was carried out by up to 300 convicts.

Mooring chains were laid across the bay to Brighton Beach in 1839 to provide safe anchorage for vessels up to 300 tons during the construction of the Basin.

Dimension sandstonewas prepared from the excavated rock and was used to construct the vertical seawalls, including the quay wall at the eastern end of Brighton Beach and the pier and Pier Head that formed the northern side or breakwater (structure) of this first basin. The two basal courses of the sea walls are made of dressed quartz sandstone blocks and the upper portions of the seawalls are constructed from less durable sandstone stone blocks.

The bases of the sea walls are keyed into the parent rock and the blocks of stone were laid on a thin lime mortar bed and joints. Non-selected rubble was compacted behind the newly constructed walls and in the case of the Central Pier it was founded in part on laid dimension stone. The surplus fill was used to reclaim the area behind the quay wall and east of the Central Pier. Final adjustments to the facing walls were made using a diving bell that had been brought from England to be used in the construction of the semi-circular quay in Sydney Harbour.

Construction of the basin was completed on 25 November 1844 at a cost of £3,465 and it could accommodate coasting vessels from 5 to 20 tons.

However, because of incomplete removal of the cofferdams, the entrance depth at low water was only 5 feet 6 inches and the continued presence of the anchorage chain across the mouth of the basin meant that the anchorage was unsafe.

=== Expansion works ===
The growing need for sea transport capable of handling large volumes of bulk cargo was reflected in developments at Wollongong Harbour, which was the only public shipping place north of Shellharbour. In 1856 a timber jetty was constructed westward from the quay on the southern side of what is now Belmore Basin to accommodate the rapidly increasing traffic, but this proved only a temporary expedient.

The Kiama Steam Navigation Company erected a large weighbridge in 1858 to weigh coal carts.

In 1858 the Illawarra Steam Navigation Company was formed through the merger of the Kiama, Wollongong, and Shoalhaven Steam Navigation Companies. The screw steamer SS Illawarra was too big to berth in the basin and in 1858 a petition for improved and enlarged harbour facilities, essentially to provide for the prospect of a large coal trade, was presented to the Governor Sir William Denison. In July that year, Denison and Edward Orpen Moriarty, the NSW Department of Public Works Engineer in Chief for Harbours and River Navigation visited Wollongong to inspect the port. Following their visit, plans were prepared for the deepening and extension of the harbour to the north-east by the construction of a significant extension to the existing basin and for the construction of the eastern breakwater.

In January 1859 plans and estimates for additional harbour accommodation were approved and £26,892 was voted towards deepening the old basin to 10 feet, the formation of a new basin opening into the existing one and the formation of a breakwater for the protection of the outer roadstead. The new basin was to be 300 feet long, 102 feet wide and 10 feet deep at low tide and the stone excavated was to be used to construct the new breakwater.

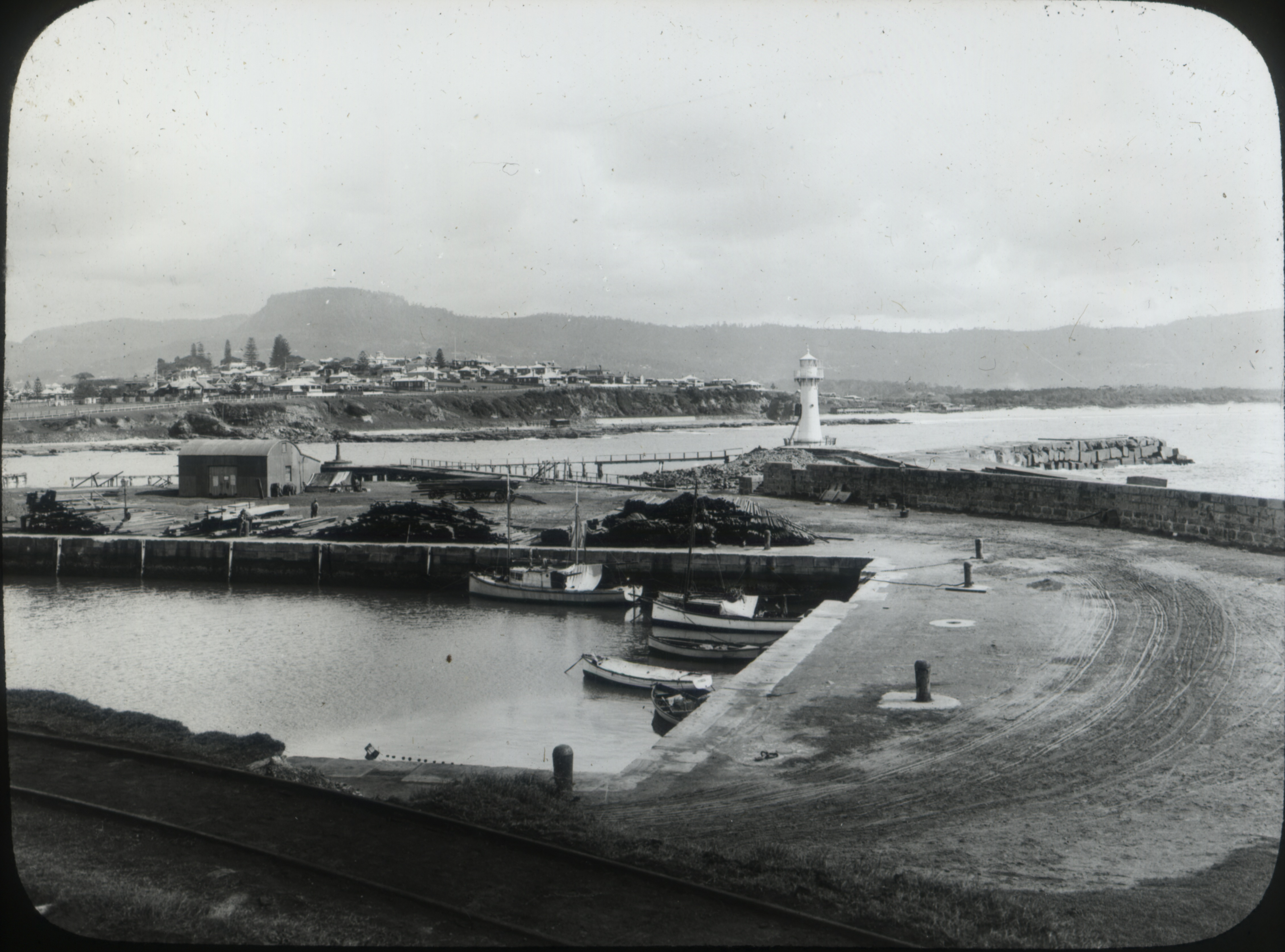
Wollongong Harbour with Belmore Basin in the foreground.

Works of this character and magnitude were new to the colony and though tenders were invited twice, the first time in December 1860, no satisfactory offer was obtained. As the government of New South Wales could not get the work done under one contract, it reluctantly subdivided the work into a number of smaller contracts with the government providing the necessary major construction plant. Work commenced in August 1861 when the SS Kembla brought down the necessary plant.

A substantial cofferdam was constructed across the entrance of the old basin to allow the new works to be constructed in the dry.

Before work extending the harbour was completed, it became clear that the facilities would not be adequate to cater for the expanding coal trade at the port. A decision was taken to further increase the size to 455 feet by 153 feet. In 1864 parliament voted £5,000 for this work .

Up to this time, coal had been sent to Sydney in small vessels for the purpose of transhipment to foreign ports. To meet the berthing requirements of larger ships that had a deeper draught, Parliament was asked, in 1866, for £10,000 to allow the Basin to be deepened to 18 feet [at low water]. However, the inner basin deepened to 18 feet and the existing basin was only deepened to 14 feet.

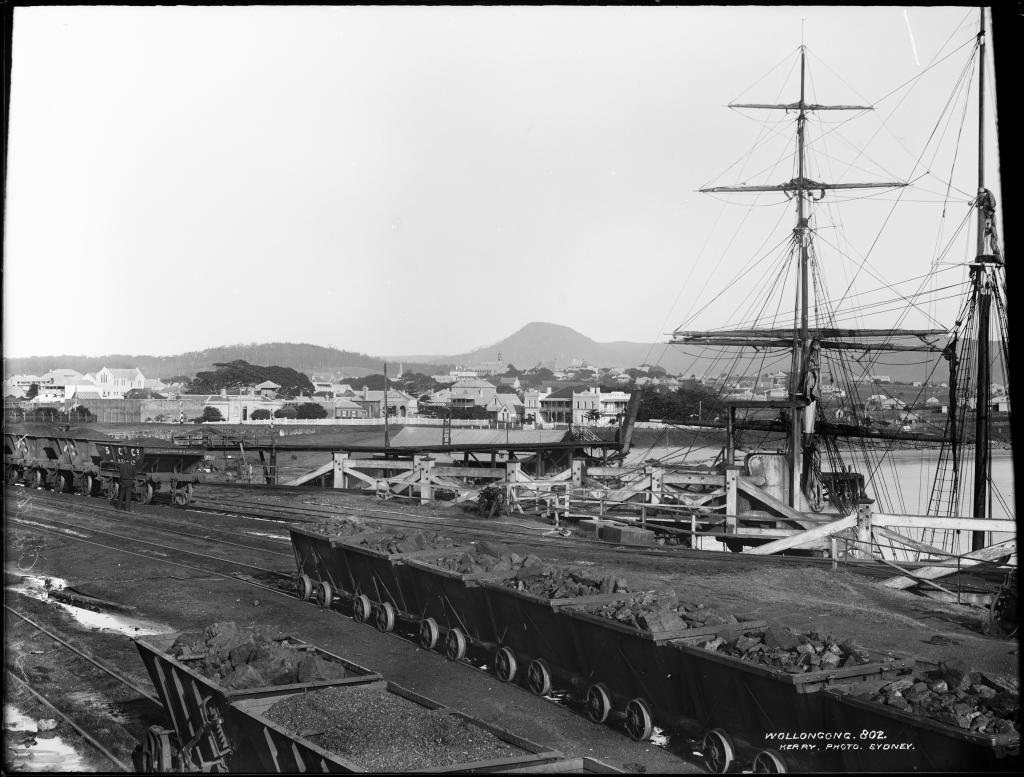
Wollongong Harbour - The coal staiths can be seen, on the left, between the coal wagons and ship.

The walls of the Basin were brought up to the design level using two basal layers of quartz sandstone keyed into the parent rock, and upper portions of the sea walls were again constructed from lithic sandstone blocks that had been prepared from the lithic sandstone that had been won as part of the construction of the new basin. Non-selected rubble was compacted behind the newly constructed walls. The surplus fill was used to reclaim the area behind the Quay wall and east of the Central Pier, the start of what was to become the Lighthouse Breakwater and local roadworks. At this time a further £3000 was voted for the construction of three high-level timber coal staithes connecting to the Mount Keira and Mount Pleasant rail lines. The staithes were elevated platforms on timber trusses, somewhat like bridges, that came off the terrace to the south above the Basin and were connected to the tramways. They allowed coal laden skips to off-load their coal into chutes that led into the holds of colliers berthed in the Basin. Each staithe had the potential to load up to 1000 tons a day.

After seven years and an expenditure of £44,892 the extension to the original Basin was completed. The harbour now provided 1748 feet of wharfage; sufficient for 15 vessels to moor alongside. Lady Belmore, the wife of the then Governor, opened the new basin on 6 October 1868 and named it Belmore Basin.

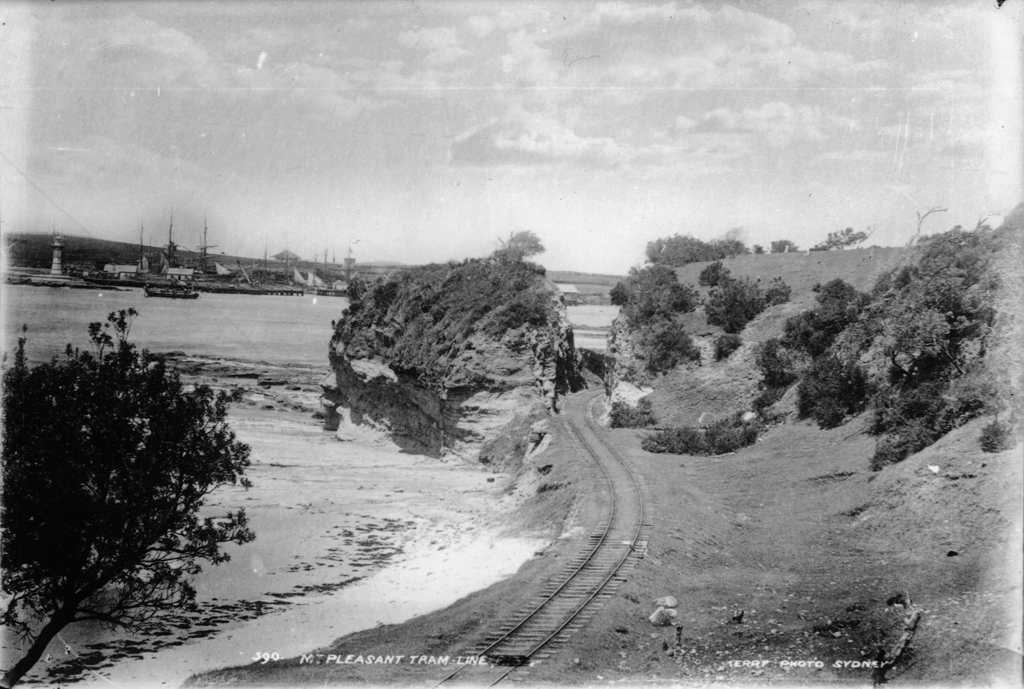
Mt Pleasant Tramway - Cutting with Wollongong Harbour in the background (Date unknown within 1884–1917, Tyrrell Photographic Collection, Powerhouse Museum.)

During construction of Belmore Basin, the area towards the Pier Head was widened and partially filled and the eastern half of the current Central Pier was constructed to incorporate a widened Pilot's Slipway and stone steps to the outer harbour.

=== Lighthouse construction and coal facilities ===
In 1862 the newly constructed tramway of the Mt Pleasant Coal and Iron Co Ltd. brought the first load of coal from its mine to the harbour. The line approached the harbour along the foreshore from North Beach and the alignment is clearly identified by the present cycleway. Both the Mt Pleasant Mine and Mt Keira Mine tramways were initially 3 feet 9 inches gauge but in 1879 they were widened to standard gauge - 4 feet 8 1/2 inches, when steam locomotives replaced the horse drawn skips thereby dramatically increasing the capacity of the mines to deliver coal to the port.

The planned eastern breakwater was built between 1867 and 1869 using stone excavated from the construction of the basin. The breakwater lighthouse was not part of the original plans of the 1859 Moriarty harbour improvements. In 1867, following a deputation to the Minister of Public Works, it was agreed a lighthouse would be constructed. Prior to 1867 the entrance to the harbour was marked with a beacon atop a pole at the end of the Pier

Moriarty made a visit to Wollongong Harbour in January 1870 in company with the Minister and Colonial Architect James Barnet, and again later in June to select a site for a proposed lighthouse (the Wollongong Breakwater Lighthouse).

Tenders were called in October with the successful tenderer a Joseph Mather. The final cost of the lighthouse, including foundations and lantern house and light was in the vicinity of £3,451.

The original light apparatus was dismantled around 1970 and the light permanently extinguished in 1974 but the fabric was substantially restored in 1999-2000 under a State Funded conservation program at a cost of $100,000.

In 1873 a timber wharf, henceforth known as the Steamer Wharf, was built, replacing an earlier 1856 timber wharf. This was the second of three wharf constructions on this site, the last being the present wharf that was constructed in the 1980s.

In 1875–76 the first coke ovens in the Illawarra, eventually two batteries of six ovens, were built for James Osborne, who was associated with the Mt Keira Colliery, and William Ahern. They were established for the manufacture of coke, salt and firebricks. The coke produced from slack coal from the Mt Keira colliery was used both domestically and exported from the port. As an adjunct to the coke making, the heat produced was to be used to produce salt in salt pans by evaporating sea water. The business was later extended to produce bone dust. The business failed and the materials from the demolished batteries were used in the upgrade of the Mt Keira railroad.

A second set of two bee-hive ovens were built in the same area by William Ashley. These were successfully operated until the lease expired in 1890. These ovens were demolished in 1892. During roadwork construction the remains of the two bee hive ovens were unearthed. The ovens were recorded and re-covered as a conservation measure. An interpretive sign is now located on the refilled site.

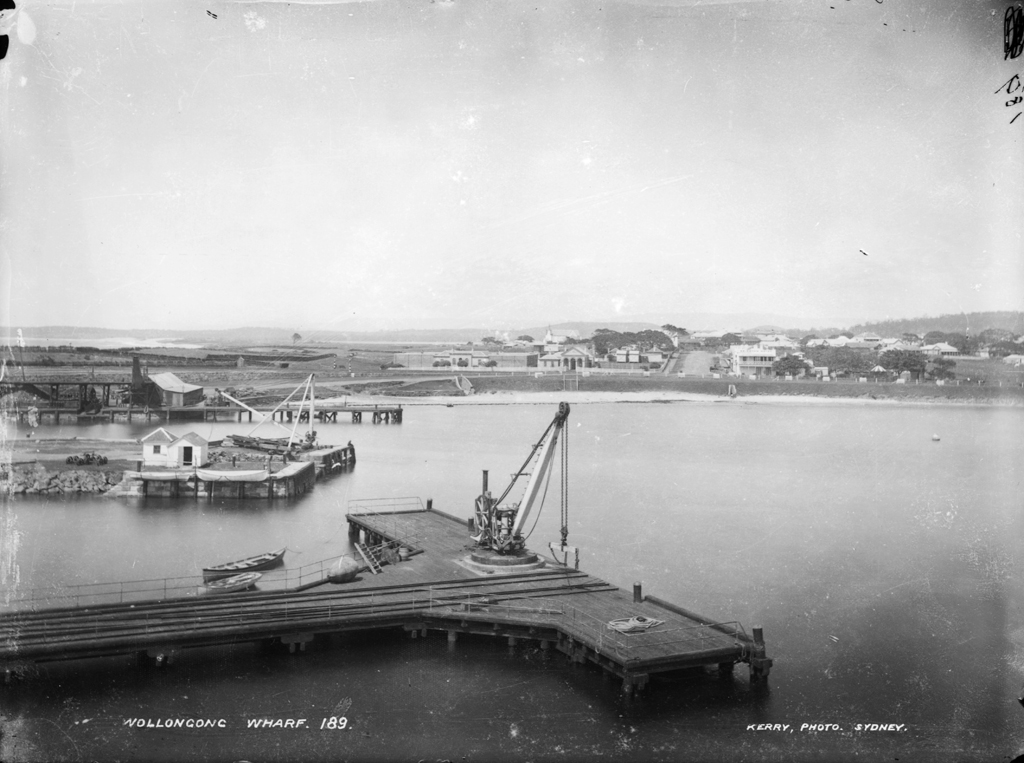
T-Jetty and its steam crane in the foreground with Steamer Wharf in the background. (Date unknown, within 1887–1917, Tyrrell Photographic Collection, Powerhouse Museum).

A timber T jetty designed and constructed by the NSW Department of Public Works was built in 1880 to increase the harbour's cargo handling capacity. At the same time, the harbour rail system was extended onto the Tee Jetty. The jetty was serviced by a derrick crane that was positioned on the outer edge of the jetty. The winch was powered by steam from a vertical boiler.

In 1881, to prevent waves from washing into the Basin during heavy seas and to protect the coal wagons crossing to the T Jetty, a sandstone block wall up to 12 feet high was constructed on the seaward side of the Basin and another wall constructed between Pulpit Rock and the base of the Cliff. At this time, the railway was also extended around the eastern and northern sides of the Basin.

In 1885, a fourth coal staithe was built in line with the original three, a smaller high-level coaling staithe was constructed to service the Illawarra Steam Navigation Company wharf at the southern end of the original Basin and two 15 ton quayside steam cranes were erected on the northern side of Belmore basin. The four straits provided a loading capacity of 150 tons per hour. The two 15 ton steam cranes were able to load 100 tons an hour and a third could handle 120 a fourth larger crane was able to load 200 tons per hour.

=== Installation of port defences ===
The need for defence installations around Wollongong harbour had been raised as early as 1839 by Barney but went unanswered until the 1879 when in answer to calls for artillery to reinforce the newly formed rifle corps, a three-gun battery was established on the northern side of Flagstaff Hill facing the harbour approaches. The three guns were surplus 1861 vintage 68-pounder smooth bore muzzle loaders.

A 12-pounder gun that was placed adjacent to the 3 guns was used as the 1 o'clock gun. In 1983, these guns were restored and placed in their present position on reconstructed carriages. An interpretive sign is located near the three guns.

By the mid 1880s, calls were again renewed for the construction of permanent gun emplacements. Colonel Scratchley and Commander Howard RN reported that enemy cruisers could steam off the coast out of range of obsolete weapons and demand bunker coal from ports such as Newcastle and Wollongong in return for not bombarding them. Taking on board this advice, the government accepted that it was vital new defence plans be made.

The Royal Commissions in the 1880s led to a Report on Defence in NSW being submitted to Parliament in 1887. The defence system that was agreed upon proposed fixed fortifications with adequate protection for the defenders to be built to defend the Colony's vital ports at Newcastle, Sydney Harbour and Wollongong. In the case of Wollongong, the report recommended that a defence system comprising a concealed emplacement at Flagstaff Hill and two smaller emplacements to the north and south be built. The gun at Flagstaff Hill was to be a very large gun to be placed under cover near the summit of Flagstaff Hill and capable of being traversed so it could fire in any direction. The gun was to be powerful enough to sink any ship from Port Kembla in the south, the Five Islands seaward and Bulli to the north.

In 1887 the Department of Public Works Military Works Branch called tenders for emplacements to be built at Cliff Road Smiths Hill and at Signal Hill.

The Signal Hill emplacement was built in 1890 and had a battery of one Vickers Armstrong Mark V 6 inch breech loading hydro-pneumatic disappearing gun that was located in a deep circular pit. The pit was connected by tunnels to the magazine and shell stores, casemate, flanking depression range finder and observation posts, two machine gun posts and the entrance to the Battery from the Battery yard.

To save costs, the Smith's Hill emplacement had a battery of two 80 pound rifled muzzle loader guns from the Royal Gun factory at Woolwich and was built in 1891–92.

=== Coal exports ===
During the period from 1860 to what was almost the peak of Wollongong's coal trade in 1889, coal exports increased more or less with the capacity of the port to service it. In 1870, 70,000 tons were exported rising to over 700,000 tons in 1889. In 1885 Wollongong Harbour cleared 1,624 vessels. The average annual export of butter from the port was 1,600,000 pounds. The port of Wollongong was now at its peak, and in terms of cargo handled was the third largest port in New South Wales after Sydney and Newcastle. This importance was to be short lived.

The impact of the increasing coal trade at the harbour was most evident between the 1860s and 1920s when the harbour was encircled by railway lines. From the 1860s it was the central port for all the Illawarra collieries. The timber coal staithes, provided high level loading facilities that allowed coal to be tipped into chutes directly into the holds of the sailing ships and coastal steamers that visited the port. However, the escalating activity at the harbour reduced the public amenity of the area and was a contributing factor in the move of the town focus to Market Square in the 1870s and subsequently to Crown Street in the 1880s when the government railway came to Wollongong.

The Wollongong Harbour Trust Act of 1889 empowered its commissioners to construct a convenient, safe and commodious harbour and to develop an extensive dock or basin in Tom Thumb Lagoon connected to the harbour. Earlier in 1885, the NSW Government had sought the advice of the British engineer Sir John Coode, a leading authority on harbour design and construction who had visited Wollongong in 1885. Coode's proposal, that was adopted by the commissioners, was to form a harbour enclosing an area of 107 acres by means of two breakwaters, the Eastern Breakwater running north from Pulpit Rock and the northern one in a south easterly direction from Para [now Fairy] Creek. Some evidence remains today of the start made on the northern breakwater which was to run from Pulpit Rock. However, in the depressed times finance was not forthcoming and the work was abandoned. Early in 1893 a start was made to construct a breakwater running north from the Breakwater Lighthouse, but this was halted after only 240 feet had been built.

=== Competition with Port Kembla ===
The death knell of the harbour as a coal port probably commenced in 1883 when the Mount Kembla Coal and Oil Company constructed a jetty at Port Kembla. The Southern Coal Company followed suit in 1887 with both jetties being connected to the mines by rail and in 1888, both jetties to the Sydney to South Coast railway. These new jetties allowed ships of up to 4000 tons to be loaded. At Wollongong the limit was about 800 tons, but most vessels were under 300 tons. The capacity to load coal directly into large steamships eliminated the need for small coastal colliers to carry coal to Port Jackson for transhipment.

The Customs House of the Port was originally a small weatherboard building on Brighton Lawn at the foot of Harbour Street, but when the Department of Justice moved in 1885 to the new Courthouse in Market Street, the old Courthouse became the office and residence of the Customs Officer.

The coming of the Government railway to Wollongong in 1888 broke the region's total dependence on sea transport and spelt the end of the steamship passenger service to Wollongong, the railway being a more reliable, faster, less expensive means of transport.

Port Kembla had the advantage of being a safe harbour with deep moorings that accommodated much larger vessels than could be brought into Wollongong Harbour. In 1898, the Port Kembla Harbour Act ensured the future of Port Kembla as the major port. Wollongong Harbour's decline was rapid. By 1901, Wollongong Harbour no longer traded regularly with other ports, except Sydney. The Mt Keira and Mt Pleasant mines continued to bring coal to the port for shipment to the domestic Sydney market. Cessation of coal exports in 1936, led to the demolition of the coal staithes, quayside cranes and rail lines and associated infrastructure were gradually dismantled and the last staithe disappeared around 1937.

=== Lighthouse replacement ===
In 1937 the new Wollongong Head Lighthouse constructed on Flagstaff Point came into service and took over from the Breakwater Lighthouse as the major light in the area. This lighthouse was constructed using local labour under the supervision of Department of Transport and Shipping. The cost of the tower was £6,800 with plant and equipment a further £2,607. It was one of the first fully automated flashing light to be installed in NSW.

In 1937, Wollongong Council announced its intention to reclaim the harbour foreshores as well as the now disused Mt Pleasant and Mt Keira railways. Over the ensuing eight years, the owners of this land, Australian Iron & Steel, gradually transferred title to the council.

The Illawarra and South Coast Steam Navigation Company [ISCSN Co] finally abandoned the unprofitable Wollongong service in 1948, severing the last passenger and goods link between Wollongong harbour and other coastal ports.

As colliers vacated the wharfage in the late 19th and early 20th century, fishing vessels and later leisure craft filled the vacuum.

=== Boat building ===
In 1909, the wooden steam tug ss Dumaresq was built at Wollongong Harbour. Hardwood timber was sourced from the NSW South Coast – ironbark from Pebbly Beach and spotted gum from Termeil was carried by sea to Wollongong aboard the wooden steamer ss Our Elsie – and kauri pine, for top-sides and decking, from New Zealand. The hull of the tug was launched 'broadside' between the location of the existing Coast Guard building and the breakwater, where there is now a rock-filled seawall on the land-side of the existing slipway. She is probably the only vessel built at Wollongong Harbour.

=== Fishing and recreation use ===
Since 1948 most of the principal changes at Wollongong Harbour have been associated with removal of working appliances associated with a trading port – cranes, the Illawarra Steam Navigation Company coaling staithe and store, and the pier head on the southern side of the entrance to Belmore Basin. The Pilot/Harbourmaster was withdrawn in 1955 and the station closed. The remaining buildings associated with the station were progressively demolished in the 1960s.

In the 1960s a slipway capable of handling large fishing vessels was constructed near the Lighthouse breakwater and in 1966–67 the Northern breakwater was constructed to provide safe anchorage for pleasure craft so the only vessels using Belmore Basin were the commercial fishing fleet.

Later additions to the area have been the Royal Volunteer Coastal Patrol building on the Central Pier Head (1971), and a commercial building containing the Fishermans Cooperative and restaurants and cafes.

During the 1980s a timber public jetty was constructed in the vicinity of the former 1856 ISN Co jetty and the 1873 ISCN Co later ISCNSN Co Ltd replacement jetty.

The Basin is currently used as the port for the locally based commercial fishing fleet and safe mooring for recreational boats. Facilities around the Basin include the Fishermen's Cooperative receival facility and retail sales, slipway and workshops, restaurant and cafes and headquarters of the local Australian Volunteer Coastal Patrol. The Outer Harbour provides safe mooring for recreational vessels and a jetty for visiting vessels. The balance of the curtilage is in high demand as open space, scenic viewing points and recreation including swimming.

== Description ==
The Wollongong Harbour Precinct is an area that includes Wollongong Head, Belmore Basin and the Outer Harbour and breakwaters, Brighton Lawn, Mt Pleasant and Mt Keira tramways alignment, the beachfront north from the Harbour Northern Breakwater including the two ocean baths.

The precinct also includes Smith's Hill Fort on Cliff Road, Osborne Park on the western side of Cliff Road and the Old Court House and the Customs House on the corner of Harbour Street and Cliff Road.

It is bounded to the north by the southern boundary of the NSW State Heritage listed North Beach Precinct, Cliff Road to the west, the southern side of Wollongong Head to the south and the Pacific Ocean to the east.

The major features of heritage interest contained within this area are:

=== Belmore Basin ===
The block walled harbour [dimension dressed stone vertical sea walls with lime mortar joints]- now referred to as Belmore Basin is a combination of the 1837–44 constructed Quay, curved basin and Central Pier and the 1861–1868 extension [and deepening] of the harbour. The vertical dressed stone sea-walls have been built from imported quartz sandstone for the base courses and lithic sandstone won from the excavated material. As part of the Harbour 1860s improvements a high coursed random stone wall was constructed on the southern side of the harbour as part of the infrastructure needed for the three high level staithes [and a later fourth staithe] that projected from the upper terrace of the wall. Some bollards and mooring rings remain in-situ around the Basin.

=== Pilots Slipway ===
The present slipway located in the Central Pier was developed from the original 1844 slipway, it was extended in the 1860s harbour development and later extension in 1905. There is evidence of the boatshed and mechanism that was used to winch the Pilot Boat from the harbour.

=== Belmore Basin/Breakwater Lighthouse ===
The lighthouse is constructed from a prefabricated, shaped inch wrought iron boiler plate that was later riveted vertically and horizontally on-site to an iron skeleton framework to form the tower. The lighthouse is 42 feet high, 13 feet diameter at its base, diminishing by concave batter to 8 feet diameter at the top. The base of the tower is set on a bull-nosed sandstone foundation that sits on top of a substantial concrete foundation block. An elegant lantern house sits at the top of the tower. The lantern house has an outer gallery of cast iron supported on ornamental brackets, with Barnet style ornamental railing. The framework of the lantern house is gun-metal and is glazed with polished plate-glass 3/4 inch thick. The roof and surmounting finial are of copper. The lighthouse has high level port-hole style windows and a door one storey up that was accessed by a ladder. Access between the three timber floors is by steel ladders. The ground level door is an addition. The light - originally a fixed one is of fourth order construction on the cata-dioptric principle and manufactured by Chance Brothers Ltd, Birmingham The lens used state-of-the-art prisms to maximise the light from the vegetable oil lit lamp. This was later converted to acetylene gas in 1883 and later again to electricity.

=== 1880 T Jetty Crane Pedestal ===
This feature comprises a substantial concrete pedestal and an embedded forged iron support column that is isolated in an embayment of the Outer Harbour. This is all that remains of a steam crane that provided a lifting facility for a timber T jetty that was built in the Outer Harbour in 1880. The jetty was demolished around 1930.

=== Outer Harbour ===
The Outer Harbour elements consist of:

- the Moriarty 1869 rubble mound breakwater [now precast concrete block armoured and concreted over] - on which the lighthouse stands,
- a short rubble mound concrete block armoured spur breakwater that projects into the ocean that the short-lived Wollongong Harbour Trust League constructed in the 1890s, and
- the northern rubble mound breakwater that was constructed in 1966–67.

The breakwaters have been subjected to periodic repair following storm damage and settlement since their construction.

- a sandstone block wall on the seaward side of the Basin that was constructed in 1881 and another of similar height that was constructed at the same time between Pulpit Rock and the cliff face. The walls measure up to 12 feet high. A 4 feet high rubble embankment that connects the larger wall to Pulpit Rock has largely disappeared.

=== Brighton Lawn and Beach ===
This area over time has changed significantly from originally a sandy shingle beach from where produce was transshipped to waiting vessels. Created in 1870 from sand dredged from the harbour, the raised terrace area - later known as Brighton Lawn Reserve, named by Governor Bourke in 1840 to conjure up visions of Brighton Beach in Britain, was the site of the first Customs House. The Mt Pleasant and Mt Keira tram lines ran around its periphery. In the 1880s twelve Norfolk Island pines were planted in an arc on the Reserve and five seats were installed under these trees. Two of the original trees remain. Following the removal of the tramways in the 1930s, the area has been heavily landscaped with the addition of sealed parking areas, concrete paths, kiosk and toilet block. The foreshore of the elevated Lawn is protected by gabions, but these have failed and now need restoration. Apart from the original convict Quay wall little remains of this part of the 19th century harbour.

=== Wollongong Head Lighthouse ===
The Wollongong Head lighthouse is a reinforced concrete tower 9 feet 10 inches in diameter standing 83 feet high from top of foundation to top of ventilator. The external surface of the tower is decorated with a 16 feet blind arch colonnade below a prominent cornice and, above this for 50 feet the tower has 1 foot wide vertical, evenly-spaced flutings, above which is a panelled parapet, balcony and lantern. Four slit windows to provide light to the internal stairwell are spaced helically around the tower and fit within the flutes. A doorway at ground level gives access to a cantilevered internal spiral staircase to the trapdoor in the lantern room floor.

The lantern room is surrounded by a balcony that has a gun-metal railing, with a zigzag detail.

=== Flagstaff Hill Fort ===
In 1881 a three-gun battery was established on the northern side of Flagstaff Hill facing the harbour approaches. The three guns were surplus 1861 vintage 68-pounder muzzle loaders.

A 12-pounder gun that was placed adjacent to the 3 guns was used as the 1 o'clock gun.

In 1983, these guns were restored and placed in their present position on reconstructed carriages. An interpretive sign is located near the three guns.

The fortification that can be seen today is the deep 1890 circular concrete pit - excavated into the hillside, that contained an Armstrong and Co Mark V 6 inch breech loading hydro pneumatic disappearing gun mounted in the pit. In the gun pit can be seen doorways to the tunnels that lead back into the hill to the underground cartridge and shell stores and the casemate. The gun emplacement was flanked by a depression range finder position and an observation station connected by underground passages to the Fort. There were also two machine gun posts on the southern side of the Fort. The entrance to the underground stores is through a brick wall, that has one doorway and two window openings, set into the hillside on the southern side of the emplacement. It can be seen from the car park that originally was the battery yard. The filled in gun pit was dug out in 1999–2000. No remains of the guns survive other than the embedded metal circular track on the floor of the gun pit on which the gun carriage rotated.

=== Chain Baths/Nuns' Pool ===
Ladies and children bathed in a secluded cove that was located on the northern tip of Flagstaff Point. The baths were first recorded in the 1830s as a ladies swimming place when convict labour erected a hut and improved access to the natural swimming hole. In 1842 Governor Gipps directed that convict labour be used to improve the pool and a path was built down the cliff to access the pool and ropes were strung across the cove to aid swimmers. In 1897, chains replaced the ropes and the pool then became known as the Ladies' Chain Baths. Largely superseded by the Ladies' Baths that were built further south in the 20th century, the Chain Baths became favoured by the nuns at a nearby convent and, over time, the pool became known as the Nuns' Pool. The remains of the baths can be seen today.

=== Ladies' Baths ===
All that remains of the Ladies' Baths that were built on the southern side of Wollongong Head is a set of low concrete weirs retaining water on three sides of a natural depression in the rock. In use from the mid 1850s, the Ladies' Baths was converted by deepening into a proper bathing place in 1887. A timber dressing shed stood on the rock shelf above and west of the pool with steps leading down the hillside to the pool. From the 1960s, segregated bathing was no longer so popular. However the baths and adjacent children's baths have continued to receive limited use.

=== Coke Ovens Site ===
Coke was produced on this site from 1875 using unsaleable coal fines. Coke was produced in two batteries of six coke ovens. A downturn in profitability saw the plant sold off in 1879 and dismantled. Two new ovens were then constructed in 1885, producing coke until 1890. The coke was used locally but the majority was shipped to the Sydney market.

=== The Old Court House and Customs Office ===
Situated south of the Harbour Street and Cliff Road intersection within the former Government Reserve established in 1833, is the 1858 brick and stone Court House building. The Old Court House replaced an earlier timber structure and served the district until 1885, when the current Market Street Courts were opened. The building was then used as a Customs House under State control until Federation, when the customs post was transferred to Port Kembla. In 1901, the building was transferred to the Australian Army for use as a drill hall. In 1974 TS Albatross Naval Cadets moved from their facilities at the harbour and occupied the site until Wollongong City Council acquired the site and the buildings were restored in 2000. The weatherboard Customs Office, dating from c 1880, was relocated from Brighton Lawn to the former Government Reserve in 1887 and moved again to its present location at the southern edge of the site in 1938 to allow for extensions to the Old Court House. The building was used as the Officers' Mess during the TS Albatross era. The buildings have been well maintained and are now used as meeting rooms for community organisations and an exhibition venue.

=== Mt Keira Osborne-Wallsend Tramway Bridge Remains ===
On the western side of Cliff Road, in Osborne Park are the remains of a timber rail bridge that spanned Smith's Creek. Built as part of the extended tramway track to transport coal from the Mt Keira Osborne-Wallsend escarpment coal mine to Wollongong Harbour, the line was officially opened in 1864. It joined the tramway track from the Mt Pleasant coal mine approximately 100 metres east of the bridge. The line operated until 1933, after which the rails were removed and the deck was lifted from the bridge. In 1997, the remaining trestles of the bridge were stabilised and further recording, repair and site interpretation was carried out.

=== North Wollongong Ocean Baths, Men's Ocean Baths, Toddlers' Pool and Continental Baths ===
Between Wollongong Harbour and North Beach, the coastal rock platforms have been used to house a variety of swimming pool and ocean bathing structures since the establishment of the first gentlemen's bathing place known as Clarke's Hole in 1871. The Men's Baths were the prime swimming baths for Wollongong following their excavation to 6 feet in 1899. Remains of the first changing shed existed up to the 1960s. In the 1920s, a Toddlers' Pool was built beside the Men's Baths and, in 1926, "continental bathing", where mixed-gender bathing was permitted, was introduced at the new Central Baths. Known as the Continental Baths, in the early 1960s, the rock pool was rebuilt as a salt-water Olympic pool with two adjacent recreational pools. The Continental Baths Pavilion was replaced in 1986 with a new brick facilities building. The old Men's Baths rock pool remains in use.

=== Tramway Alignment, Cutting and Embankment ===
The Tramway Alignment and cutting – once the permanent way for the Mt Pleasant tramway that conveyed coal wagons from the escarpment coal mine at Mt Pleasant to Wollongong Harbour from the 1860s to 1933, is now a pedestrian and cycleway. The first but short-lived escarpment coal mine was opened up at Mt Keira in 1849 by James Shoobert. In 1857, a second more successful mine was opened and, in the following years, mining began at Woonona, Bellambi, Coalcliff and Mount Pleasant. The Mount Pleasant Colliery began production in July 1861. The construction of a tramway gave access to Wollongong Harbour and was a crucial element in the success of the mine. The route proposed was to run an incline from the mine over Fairy Creek to North Wollongong Beach and then along the coast and the base of the cliff to Belmore Basin. The line was built under the provisions of the Mt Pleasant Tramways Act 1862.. The mined coal was conveyed on the Mount Pleasant line – as was the case for the Mt Keira coal, at first by horse drawn rake of coal wagons. The tramway was upgraded to standard gauge in 1879 and then operated as a steam railway. Mt Pleasant Colliery closed in 1933. The new owner of the coal leases and railway, Broken Hill Pty Ltd donated the land to Wollongong Council in 1938. The Mt Pleasant tramway alignment that runs along the beachfront is now used as a promenade and cycleway.

=== Smiths Hill Fort – Battery Park Fortress Hill ===
The Smith's Hill Battery was constructed 1892–93 was a three gun emplacement. The battery consists of a wall with three semi circular parapets. The two larger northern emplacements contain the original 1872 80-pounder rifled muzzle-loader guns that had been manufactured at the Royal Gun Factory at Woolwich UK. The southern emplacement housed a 1 1/2 inch Nordenfelt quick-firing gun. Along the wall are eight recesses, for shells and cartridges and a large casemate to provide protection for the gunners. These are closed off with wooden doors. Off-set to the north was an underground magazine that includes a cartridge store, ammunition store, workshop and lamp store. Rain water was collected from the paved areas into a series of underground overflow water tanks. A depression range finder station was located on the northern end of the site.

By the early 1900s, Federal government reorganisation of the army and advances in gunnery technology led to the closure of the Smith's Hill [and Flagstaff Hill] Fort. The forts came under the control of Wollongong Council. Later the Flagstaff Hill embankments were levelled and the entrances bricked up. The Smith's Hill entrances were sealed and the site filled with boiler ash to create a park.

In 1988, the site was excavated and the fort and the guns and their mountings were restored. Interpretive signage is located at the site.

== Current condition ==
=== Belmore Basin ===
The condition of the Basin's heritage sea-walls, both below and above the tidal zone, varies from reasonable to good. However, there are areas of concern resulting from:

- localised erosion of the poorer quality lithic sandstone bedrock resulting in undercutting in the intertidal zone, voids where mortar is missing;
- weathering of the more exposed or poorer quality lithic sandstone blocks
- movement of a section of the 1844 Central Pier wall
- ongoing movement evidenced by cracking of block work, rotation of portion of the wall and settlement behind the wall of the Basin wall of the 1844 Central Pier

The need for maintenance and stabilisation of the more affected sections of the 1844 walls is imperative and if not carried out over the next few years these walls could become unstable and fail.

There are also concerns of localised accelerated weathering of some of the sandstone blocks resulting from the use of hard cement mortar that was used to carry out earlier repairs. This comment is also applicable to the staith wall and sea walls.

=== Other Major Features ===
The other noted heritage features included in the Precinct are in good condition requiring only appropriate ongoing maintenance. The condition of buried features such as the bee hive coke ovens is unknown.

The harbour retains the configuration and scale of a coastal 19th-century trading port that was developed over time for the shipping of resources into the district and the shipping to market of significant products of the Illawarra, in particular coal. It is an easy exercise to envisage Wollongong Harbour and its attendant infrastructure in operation when in the 1880s it was the third most active port on the Colony of NSW.

The Wollongong Harbour precinct includes the following features that are not possessed to anywhere near the same degree by the other harbours and their surrounding precincts:

- the original configuration of a 19th-century harbour with associated infrastructure such as the breakwaters, sandstone block quay walls, breakwater lighthouse, staith foundations, access roadways, coal tramways and slipway, within a harbour design influenced by British practice at the time;
- associated features such as the 19th century Old Court House and Customs House, coke ovens and fortifications to protect an important and developing outpost of the Colony;
- the public amenity of the 19th century ocean bathing pools established as the town developed

== Heritage listing ==
Wollongong Harbour Precinct is of State significance because it displays the infrastructure on which the first southern port outside Sydney was founded and developed at Wollongong. It also provides evidence of the measures taken to defend that important southern outpost of the colony.

The Precinct includes fabric deriving from each stage of its development from the substantially intact 19th century convict-built harbour together with modifications made as it developed from a commercial harbour to its present function as a fishing and tourist port.

The harbour was the first port in the Illawarra and is the oldest and most intact extant block walled harbour in NSW. It comprises the Belmore Basin (the block walled harbour); the 1869 rubble mound breakwater; mooring rings, other related appurtenances and remnants of facilities left as the harbour developed.

Also included in the Precinct is the 1872 Breakwater lighthouse, one of the early lighthouses of NSW and one of only two wrought iron lighthouses in NSW – the other being at Ulladulla and built to the same design by the same engineer, Joseph Mather of Sydney.

- Other inclusions in the precinct are
- the 1937 Wollongong Head lighthouse;
- the 1858 brick and stone Old Court House and the weatherboard Customs Office;
- the remains of the 1891 Flagstaff Hill Fort;
- the remains of the 1893 Smiths Hill Fort (Battery Park);
- the remains of the Nuns' Pool/Chain Baths dating from the 1830s;
- the remains of the Ladies' Baths dating from the mid 1850s;
- the Men's Ocean Baths dating from c.1871;
- the Mt Pleasant tramway alignment, cutting and embankment – once the permanent way along which from the 1860s to 1933, coal wagons were conveyed from the Mt Pleasant coal mine to Wollongong Harbour; it is now a pedestrian track and cycleway;
- the remains of a bridge on the alignment of the 1864 tramway that conveyed coal to the harbour from the Mt Keira Osborne–Wallsend colliery;
- the buried remains of coke ovens dating from 1875.

The harbour is associated with two of the most important Colonial engineers; Belmore Basin was constructed under George Barney, Commanding Royal Engineer and Colonial Engineer, and the outer harbour under Edward Orpen Moriarty, first Engineer-in-Chief, Harbours & Rivers of the Public Works Department, whose work included the Breakwater lighthouse. The harbour was essential to the development of Wollongong and was the focus of Wollongong's commercial, administrative, judicial and social activities from the early 19th century until well into the 20th century.

The cluster of ocean baths shows the evolution of public bathing from the gender-segregated pools in use from the 19th century as represented by the 1830s Nuns Pool, the 1850s Ladies Baths and the 1871 Men's Ocean Baths, to the introduction of mixed (or continental) bathing in the Men's Baths between the First and Second World Wars, and development in the 1960s of the latter into a complex with an Olympic-size pool and children's pool.

The old courthouse is one of the earliest designed and built by the newly reorganised Colonial Architect's office after self-government in 1856; its design is repeated in other district court houses;

The fortifications were the southernmost of the colony's defences that covered the major centres of Newcastle, Sydney and Wollongong and are representative of defence strategy and technology of the late 19th century;

The bee-hive coke ovens are the only intact examples of their type remaining in NSW.

Wollongong Harbour Precinct was listed on the New South Wales State Heritage Register on 5 May 2010 having satisfied the following criteria.

The place is important in demonstrating the course, or pattern, of cultural or natural history in New South Wales.

The Wollongong Harbour Precinct is of State heritage significance as it clearly demonstrates the history and development of the precinct and its colonial role providing access for goods and people to and from southernmost outpost of the colony at Wollongong from the 1830s to the present day.

During the 1820s, Boat Harbour as the area was then known, was a shipping point for newly settled areas. From 1829 it allowed anchorage for supply boats for the military forces garrisoned there. The Precinct contains a rare and intact example of a convict built, block walled harbour constructed between 1937 and 1844 at what was the colony of NSW southernmost outpost in the early Colonial era. The harbour is the oldest block-walled harbour in NSW.

The additions alterations to the harbour which formed the Belmore Basin and the development over the years of infrastructure in the precinct such as the coal loading apparatus, rail lines, coke ovens, clearly demonstrates the harbour precincts role in the development of Wollongong and the Illawarra and its coal industry as well as agricultural and natural resource industries. The precinct including the courthouse and customs house also reflects the important maritime role the harbour precinct played in the development of bulk cargo coastal shipping in the colony and consequently the economic and infrastructure development of the colony.

Located within the precinct are a number of fortifications from the late 19th Century which also provide evidence of the importance of this colonial outpost and the evolution of the precinct's role in defence of the colony and of the colony's defence strategy from the 1850s to the early 20th Century.

The changing role of the harbour, from an important transportation node for industry to that of the home of the Illawarra fishing fleet, is also documented in the fabric of the precinct.

An important aspect of the precinct's heritage values is the evidence of the evolution of recreation and recreational uses of the precinct. The Brighton Lawn, initially the site of the first Government reserve and associated government buildings, became a centre of recreational pursuits and remains so today. There are also three sets of sea baths within the precinct, the Chain/Nuns Baths established in the 1830s and improved using convict labour in the 1840s, the ladies' baths established in the mid-1850s and the Continental Baths, which evolved out of the earlier gentlemen's and toddlers baths. The first two sets of baths were reserved for women until well into the 20th century, and the Continental Baths evolved from the gentlemen's sea baths into a mixed-gender swimming venue by the 1960s.

The place has a strong or special association with a person, or group of persons, of importance of cultural or natural history of New South Wales's history.

The historic significance of the Wollongong Harbour Precinct is enhanced by its association with important groups of people and figures in the development of NSW. The original Harbour, which is still in situ, was built by a 300 strong convict labour force housed in a convict stockade located on what is now known as Flagstaff Hill.

The first Colonial Engineer, Captain George Barney was responsible for the design and construction supervision of the original harbour, central pier and basin wall. Among Barney's significant other works were the design and supervision of the Semi-Circular Quay in Sydney, the Newcastle Harbour Breakwater and the Victoria Barracks as well as many of the coastal defence structures in Sydney.

The 1861–1878 extension of Wollongong Harbour into what is now known as Belmore Basin and also the Wollongong Breakwater lighthouse (1869–1872) was designed and overseen by Edward Orpen Moriarty, Department of Public Works Engineer in Chief, Harbours and River Navigation. Moriarty's other important colonial works included Pyrmont Bridge and several of NSW water works and supply systems such as Prospect Reservoir and Goulburn Waterworks. He designed the Trial Bay Breakwater as a way of providing a "haven" for shipping traversing the North Coast.

The place is important in demonstrating aesthetic characteristics and/or a high degree of creative or technical achievement in New South Wales.

The harbour precinct as a whole is of state significance for its landmark qualities that have been widely recognised and established over time. The precinct elements, especially the harbour and headland and lighthouses contribute to the a visual distinctiveness of the area and have made the precinct a valued asset of the city. The inclusion of the Old Courthouse and Customs Office in the precinct allows for the visual appreciation of the full function of the precinct as an important maritime port to be interpreted.

In addition these landmark elements there are a variety of significant historic views and vistas which contribute to the heritage significance of the precinct as a whole. These include views from the higher land to the north of the precinct across Brighton Lawn to Belmore Basin and the Lighthouse and from Flagstaff Hill down to the rocky breakwater and Belmore Basin which reveal a pleasing blend of nature and built infrastructure which residents, workers and visitors have admired for over 100 years.

The block-wall harbour itself has basically remained in its 19th-century configuration. It demonstrates the evolution of a 19th-century coastal harbour successfully adapting to changing cargo and associated handling technologies. Its extensive and unified use of sandstone block walls incised into the natural bedrock demonstrates a traditional construction technique and together with the timber bollards and iron mooring fixtures and fittings demonstrate a cohesive, substantially intact, distinctive mid-19th-century harbour landscape which has become rare in NSW.

The two lighthouses established in 1872 and 1937 and located within the precinct clearly demonstrate the evolution of technical changes in coastal navigation aids. Similarly the fortifications contained in the Precinct are representative of the defence strategy and technology of the late 19th Century.

The place has potential to yield information that will contribute to an understanding of the cultural or natural history of New South Wales.

The Wollongong Harbour is of State heritage significance for its research potential in providing an insight into the operation of a Colonial and early 20th Century shipping port and the infrastructure required to support a burgeoning produce and coal industries.

The place possesses uncommon, rare or endangered aspects of the cultural or natural history of New South Wales.

The Wollongong Harbour Precinct is of State Heritage significance as it contains the oldest and most intact block-walled harbour in NSW. The harbour, quay and Southern Basin are rare and substantially intact survivors of major convict harbour construction. The harbour is a rare example of a harbour that has been continuously used as a port for over 180 years.

It is one of very few coastal harbours with its historic 19th-century infrastructure and fittings such as timber bollard and fender piles, cast-iron and wrought iron mooring fixtures, the pilots' slip rails and eyelets and the crane pedestal, still in situ.

The mounts for the two 80-pounder gun for the Smith's Hill Battery are thought to be the only ones of their type remaining in NSW.

== Engineering heritage award ==
The harbour received a Historic Engineering Marker from Engineers Australia as part of its Engineering Heritage Recognition Program.

== See also ==
- Coastal coal-carrying trade of New South Wales
