= Andy Grote =

German politician (born 1968)

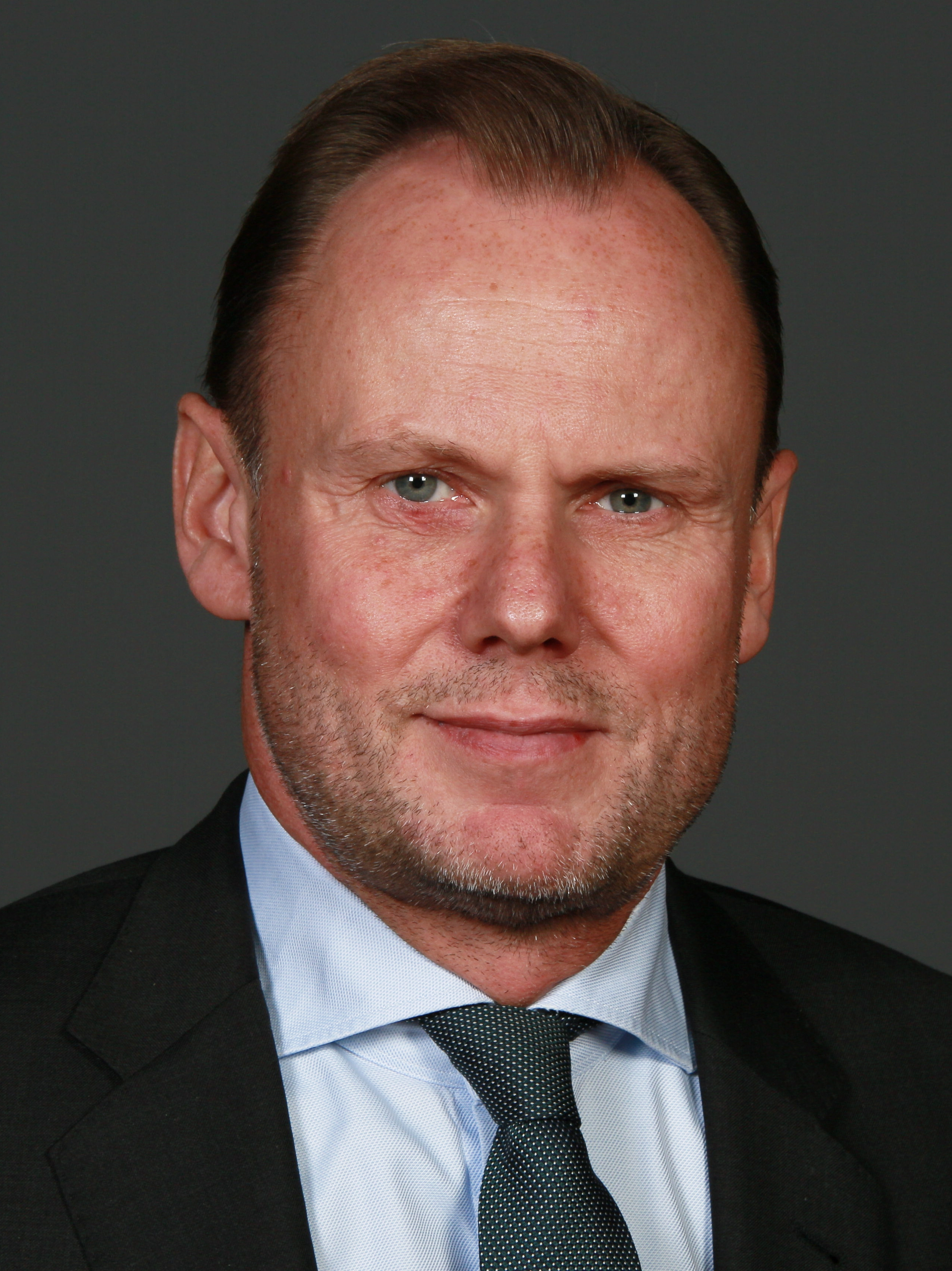
- Grote in 2018

Senator for the Interior and Sports of Hamburg
- Incumbent
- Assumed office 20 January 2016
- Mayor: Olaf Scholz; Peter Tschentscher
- Preceded by: Michael Neumann

Personal details
- Born: 14 June 1968 (age 58) Erpen, Dissen, North Rhine-Westphalia, West Germany
- Party: Social Democratic Party (since 1996)

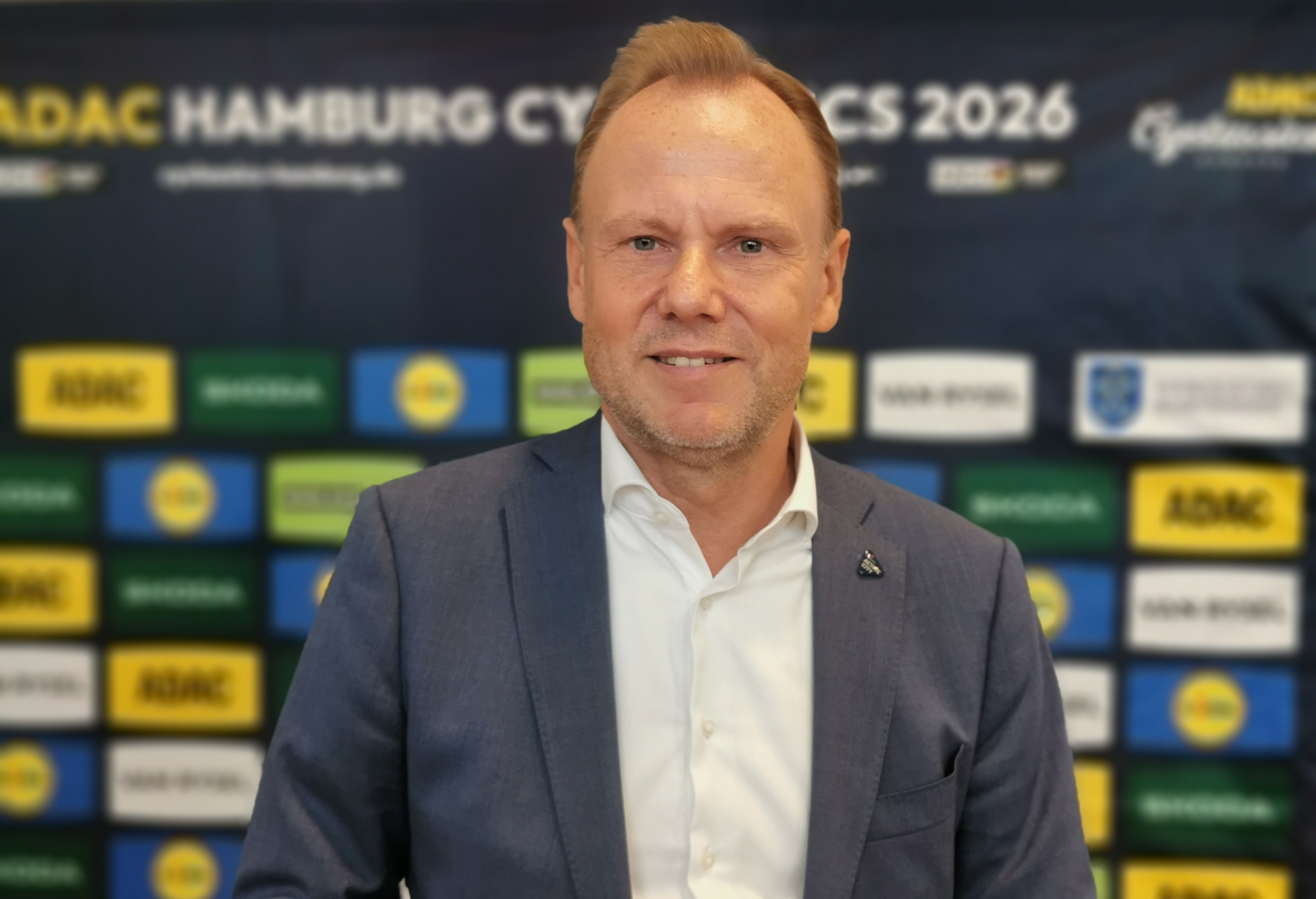
Grote in 2026

Andy Grote (born 14 June 1968) is a German politician serving as senator for the interior and sports of Hamburg since 2016. From 2008 to 2012, he was a member of the Hamburg Parliament.

== Controversies ==
=== Pimmelgate ===
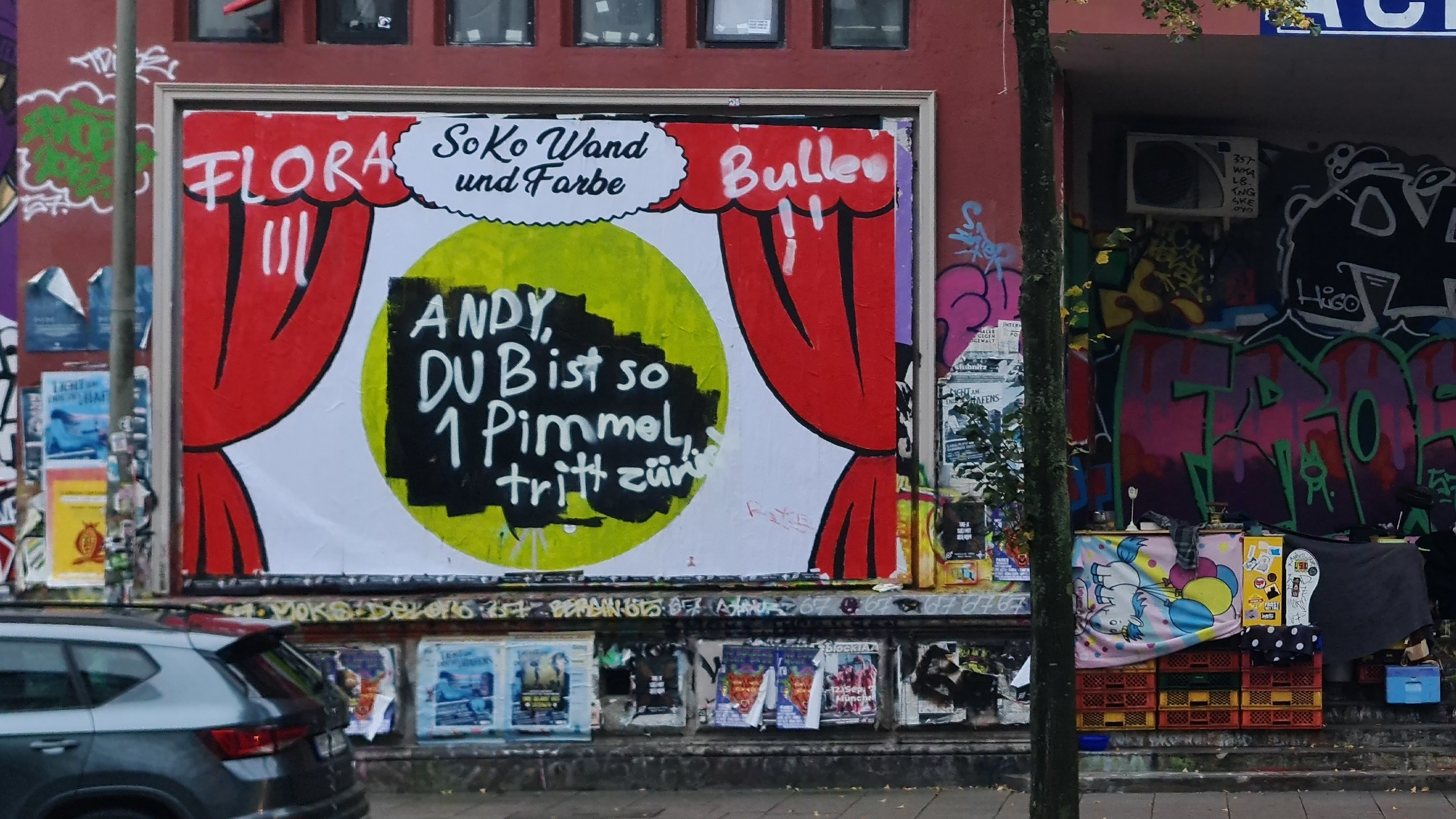
Poster on the Red Flora, the message was continuously removed by the police and re-added by an unknown party.

Grote became known throughout Germany after he filed criminal charges against a person that called Grote "1 Pimmel" on Twitter (now X). This led to the apartment of the accused ex-girlfriend being raided by the police, despite the accused having moved out a while before.

This event was widely criticized and condemned in Germany, with the raid eventually being declared illegal and all charges against the perpetrator being dropped. The controversy became known as Pimmelgate.
