= Warden Head Light =

Lighthouse in New South Wales, Australia

Warden Head Light Ulladulla Lighthouse
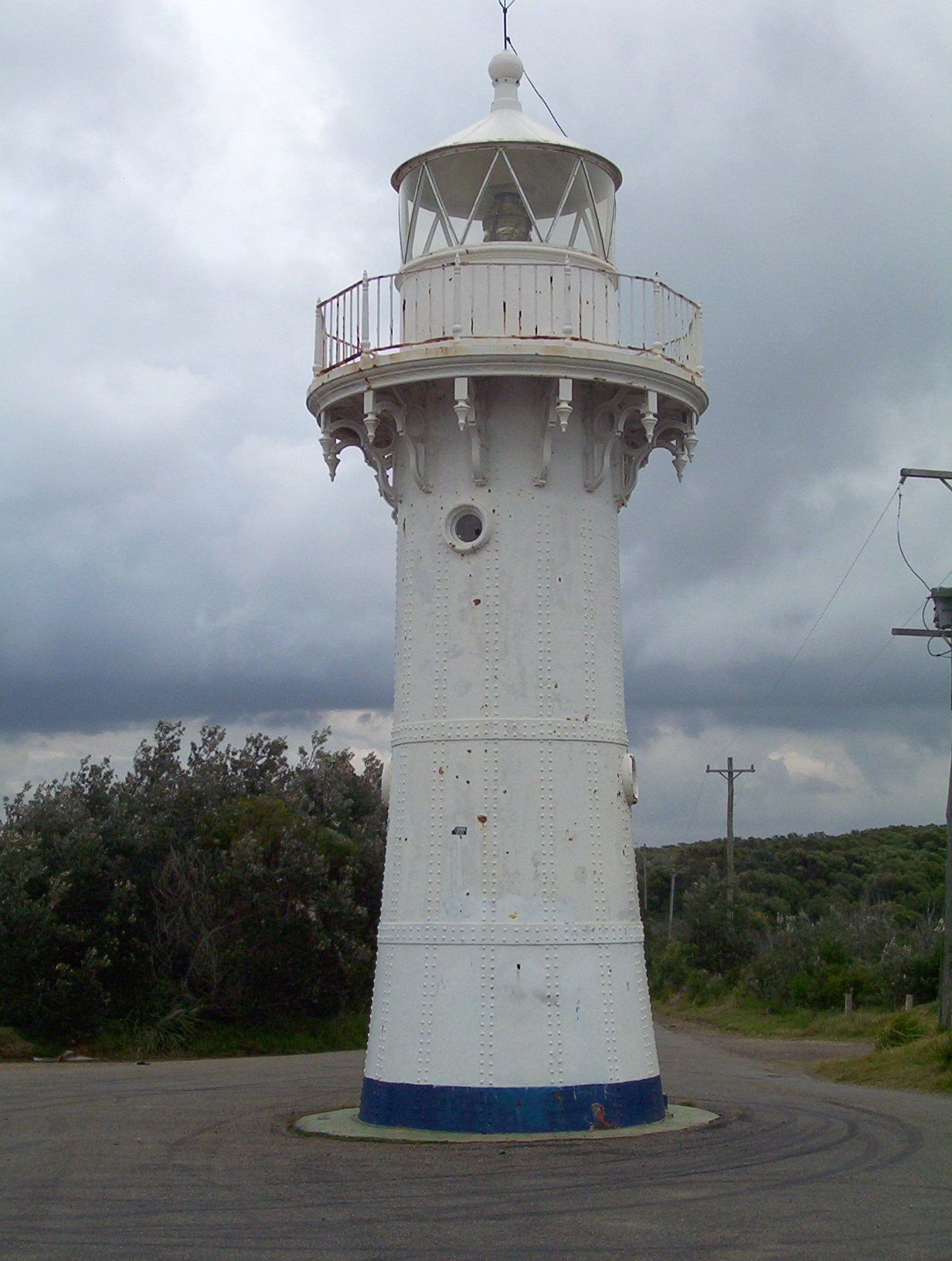
- Warden Head Light, 2007
- Location: Ulladulla, New South Wales, Australia
- Coordinates: 35°22′S 150°29′E

Tower
- Constructed: 1873
- Construction: concrete (foundation), wrought iron (tower)
- Automated: 1920
- Height: 40 ft (12 m)
- Shape: truncated cone
- Markings: white
- Power source: mains electricity, battery
- Operator: Transport for NSW

Light
- Focal height: 112 ft (34 m)
- Lens: Chance Brothers optical apparatus
- Intensity: 28,000 candela
- Range: 14 nautical miles (26 km)
- Characteristic: Fl(2) W 10s

Warden Head Light, also known as Ulladulla Lighthouse, is an active lighthouse on Warden Head, a headland south of Ulladulla, New South Wales, Australia, guarding the entrance to the Port of Ulladulla. It is one of only two wrought iron lighthouses in New South Wales, the other being its sibling, Wollongong Breakwater Lighthouse. It is also notable for two relocations: the tower was constructed in 1873 on the Ulladulla Breakwater, and relocated in 1889 to its current location. Its keeper's house was relocated to a different location in the 1920s.

== History ==
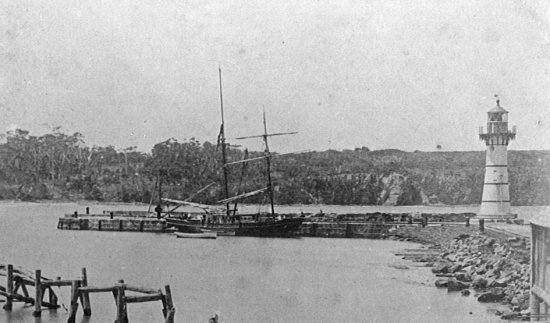
Warden Head Lighthouse in 1879, at its original location on the Ulladulla Breakwater.

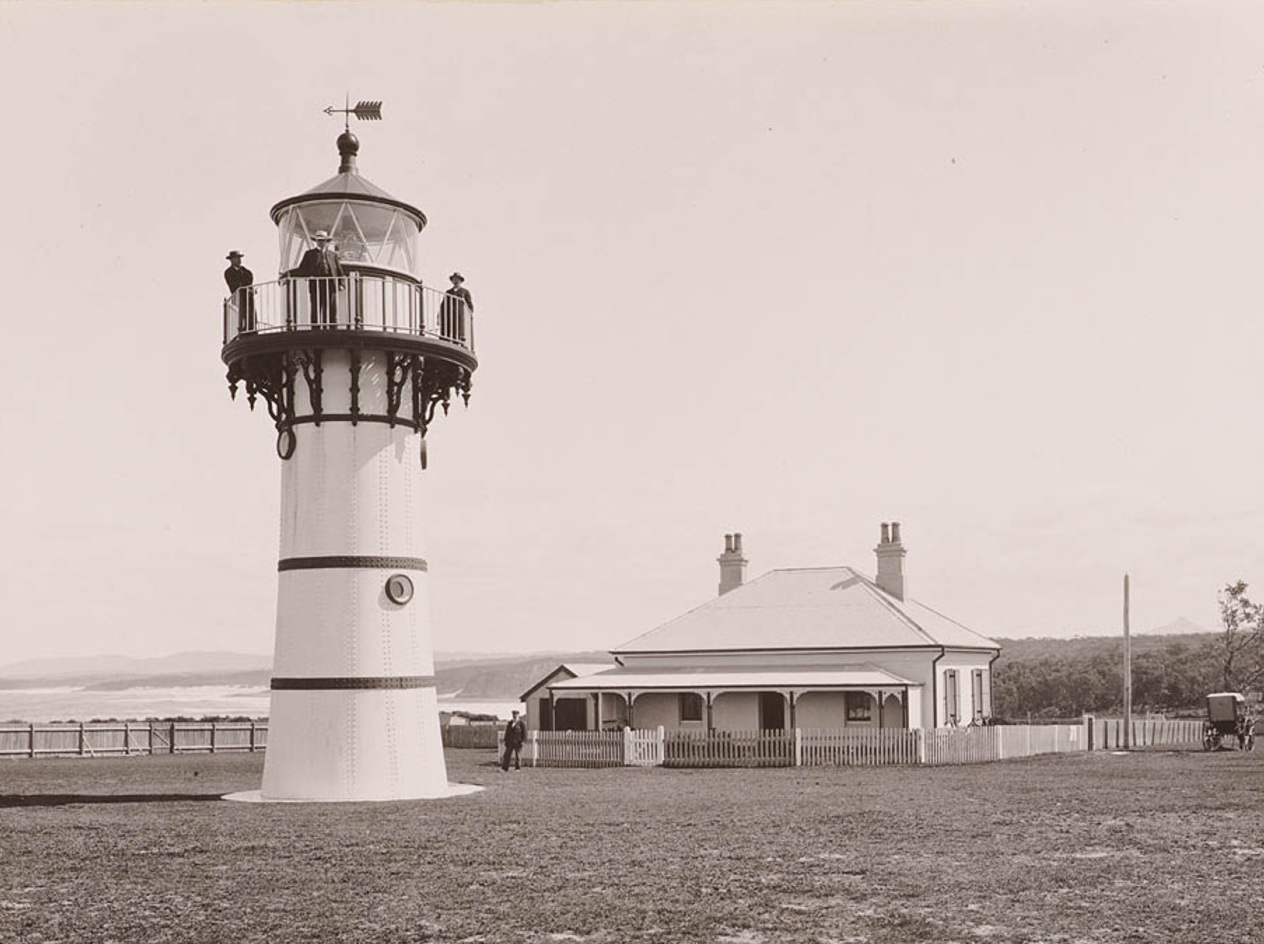
Warden Head Lighthouse, 1902. The keeper's house which was relocated later can also be seen.

First recommendations for construction of a lighthouse at the Ulladulla Harbour were made in 1868, enabling night activity at the port. Construction of a lighthouse at the Ulladulla Harbour breakwater was initiated by Edward Orpen Moriarty MA MInstCE, Engineer in Chief of the New South Wales Harbours and Rivers Department, together with a second lighthouse at Belmore Basin, Wollongong. Both lighthouses were designed by Colonial Architect's Office, then under Colonial Architect James Barnet. Tenders were invited in October 1869 by the Public Works Department, and both lighthouses were constructed by Joseph Mather, Wollongong Breakwater Lighthouse in 1872 and Warden Head Lighthouse in 1873.

The original light source was oil wick with a light intensity of 800 cd, with a Chance Brothers optical apparatus, which is still present. It displayed a fixed white light (F.W.).

In 1889 the lighthouse was relocated to its current location on Warden Head, under the supervision of James Barnet, still the Colonial Architect.

In 1920 the light source was replaced with a carbide lamp, automated and demanned. The characteristic was changed to a flashing light. In 1922, the keeper's house, no longer required, was relocated to Milton to be used as a doctor's office.

In 1964 the tower was electrified; the power source is a 110 V DC battery, charged from the mains electricity. The light source is a 120 V, 1,000 W, quartz halogen lamp with an intensity of 28,000 cd, visible for 14 nautical miles (26 km; 16 mi) The light characteristic is a group of two flashes every 10 seconds (Fl.(2)W. 10s).

In the 1940s a car park was developed at Warden Head by the Ulladulla Council to encourage visitors to the lighthouse.

In 2008 the lighthouse was renovated. The lead based paint was stripped, the tower was repainted, and structural repairs were made.

=== Light keepers ===
The first Lighthouse keeper was William Gambell. Records of the Ulladulla public school show he had five children at the school.

Records of the Milton Post Office of 1904 list "Hansen J. Lighthouse keeper (Ulladulla)". The Ulladulla Post Office directory of 1904 lists "Brassington A, - lighthouse keeper".

== Structure ==
The tower is made of wrought iron plates riveted to form the shell. The plates were created in Joseph Mather's foundry at Wollongong and assembled on the original site at the Ulladulla Breakwater. The tower is 40 feet (12 m) high, with an additional 7 feet 7 inches (2.3 m) buried in the concrete foundation. The structure is divided by three timber floors connected by iron ladders.

On top of the wrought iron shell is a small balcony supported by cast iron brackets, with a plain iron handrail.

== Warden Head ==
Warden Head is named after shipwrights brothers David and James Warden. It was previously called Long Nose Point.

== Site operation and visiting ==
The light and the tower are operated by Transport for NSW. The grounds are accessible by road and parking is available, but the tower itself is closed to the public.

== See also ==
- List of lighthouses in Australia
