= Edward Richards-Orpen =

Irish politician, agriculturalist and conservationist (1884–1967)

Senator
- In office 21 April 1948 – 14 August 1951
- Constituency: Nominated by the Taoiseach

Personal details
- Born: Edward Richards Orpen; 20 October 1884 London, England
- Died: 14 November 1967 (aged 83) County Wexford, Ireland
- Party: Independent; National Centre Party
- Spouse: Margaret Tomalin (m. 1914)
- Children: 2
- Parents: Goddard Henry Orpen (father); Adela Richards (mother)
- Education: Trinity College, Cambridge
- Military career
- Branch: British Army
- Service years: 1916–1919
- Rank: Captain
- Unit: Royal Army Service Corps
- Conflicts: World War I

Edward Richards Richards-Orpen (20 October 1884 – 14 November 1967) was an Irish independent politician, agriculturalist and conservationist. He was a member of Seanad Éireann from 1948 to 1951.

== Early life and background ==
He was born Edward Richards Orpen on 20 October 1884 in London, to the family of Adela Orpen (née Richards) and Goddard Henry Orpen of Monksgrange, a historian of the Anglo-Norman period of Irish history. He was also related to Irish portrait painter, William Orpen. He attended St Paul's School, London, and went to Trinity College, Cambridge in 1903.

In April 1914 he married Margaret Tomalin, daughter of Lewis Tomalin, founder of the Jaeger clothing company. Before his marriage he changed his surname to Richards-Orpen to satisfy his mother's wish for her family's name to be preserved once he inherited the family estate. In December 1916 during World War I, he joined Royal Army Service Corps (RASC), which undertook the work of food and weapons supply to the soldiers at the front. Because of his dedicated work and leadership qualities, he was quickly promoted. After few months of joining, he was promoted to second lieutenant, followed by the post of captain.

== Post-war activities ==
On inheriting the family estate on his mother's death in 1927, he established Grange Furniture Industry. In 1928, he became secretary of the Arts and Crafts Society of Ireland.

== Politics ==
In 1932, he was involved in the establishment of a new farmers' organisation, the National Farmers' and Ratepayers' League. Later known as the National Centre Party, after the 1933 general election, it merged to form Fine Gael.

He was nominated by the Taoiseach to the 6th Seanad in 1948. He did not contest the 1951 Seanad election.

== Honors ==
The Edward Richards-Orpen Memorial Trust was established in his honor. The trust owns and operates the Monksgrange Archives.
