= Adelia Sarah Gates =

American botanical illustrator

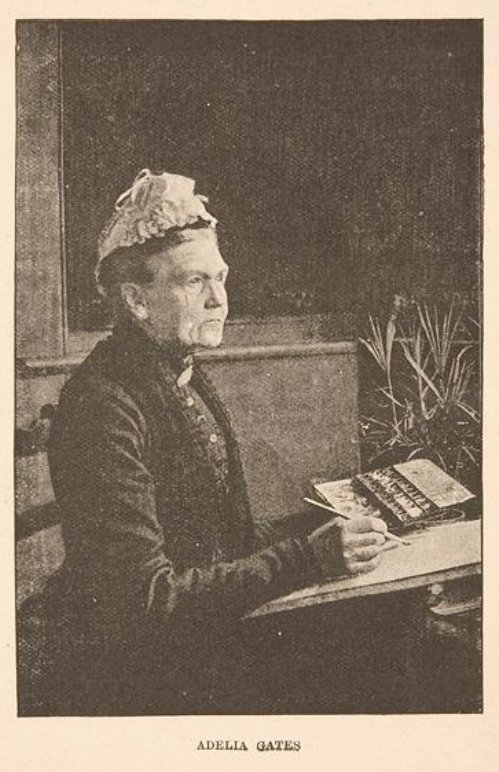
- Born: October 24, 1825; Otego, New York
- Died: September 21, 1912 (aged 86); San Francisco, California
- Education: Madame Vouga’s school, Geneva, Switzerland
- Known for: Botanical illustrator

Adelia Sarah Gates (October 24, 1825 - September 21, 1912) was an American illustrator of botanical specimens. After several years working as an elementary schoolteacher and amateur decorative painter and watercolorist, she began to expand into scientific illustration, especially of plants and flowers. She traveled, collecting and documenting specimens from her expeditions later in her life.

== Early life ==
She was born in the Susquehanna Valley, specifically Otego, Otsego County. Gates worked as a governess, farm worker and teacher. At the age of 22, Gates moved to Lowell, Massachusetts to take up work in the cotton factories. In her thirties, she attended Antioch College, only to leave after two years due to health issues.

== Career ==
She started painting in her fifties, after taking lessons from Emilie Vouga in Geneva. Later in her life in San Francisco, she sought out further education in identification and naming of specimens from noted botanists Sara Plummer Lemmon and John Gill Lemmon, for which she traded lessons in "flower painting" and sketching.

During her lifetime, a colorful biography of her life and travels including expeditions to paint specimens was written by Adela Elizabeth Orpen. Titled The chronicles of the Sid, or, The life and travels of Adelia Gates, it was published in New York by Fleming H. Revell Company and in London by the Religious Tract Society. In the book, Orpen describes Gates, who was her governess for 14 years, by saying that "Though an artist, she is not a great genius; though a traveller in many lands, she has had no thrilling adventures. She never did any horrid deed, nor suffered any hideous privations." Orpen refers to Gates as "the Sid," rather than Adelia, throughout the book explaining that "Sid means lady or mistress, and is the title by which she was known in the Sahara."

Gates died in San Francisco on September 21, 1912. After her death, over 600 of her works were exhibited and donated to the United States National Museum, Smithsonian Institution.
