= Flagstaff Hill Fort =

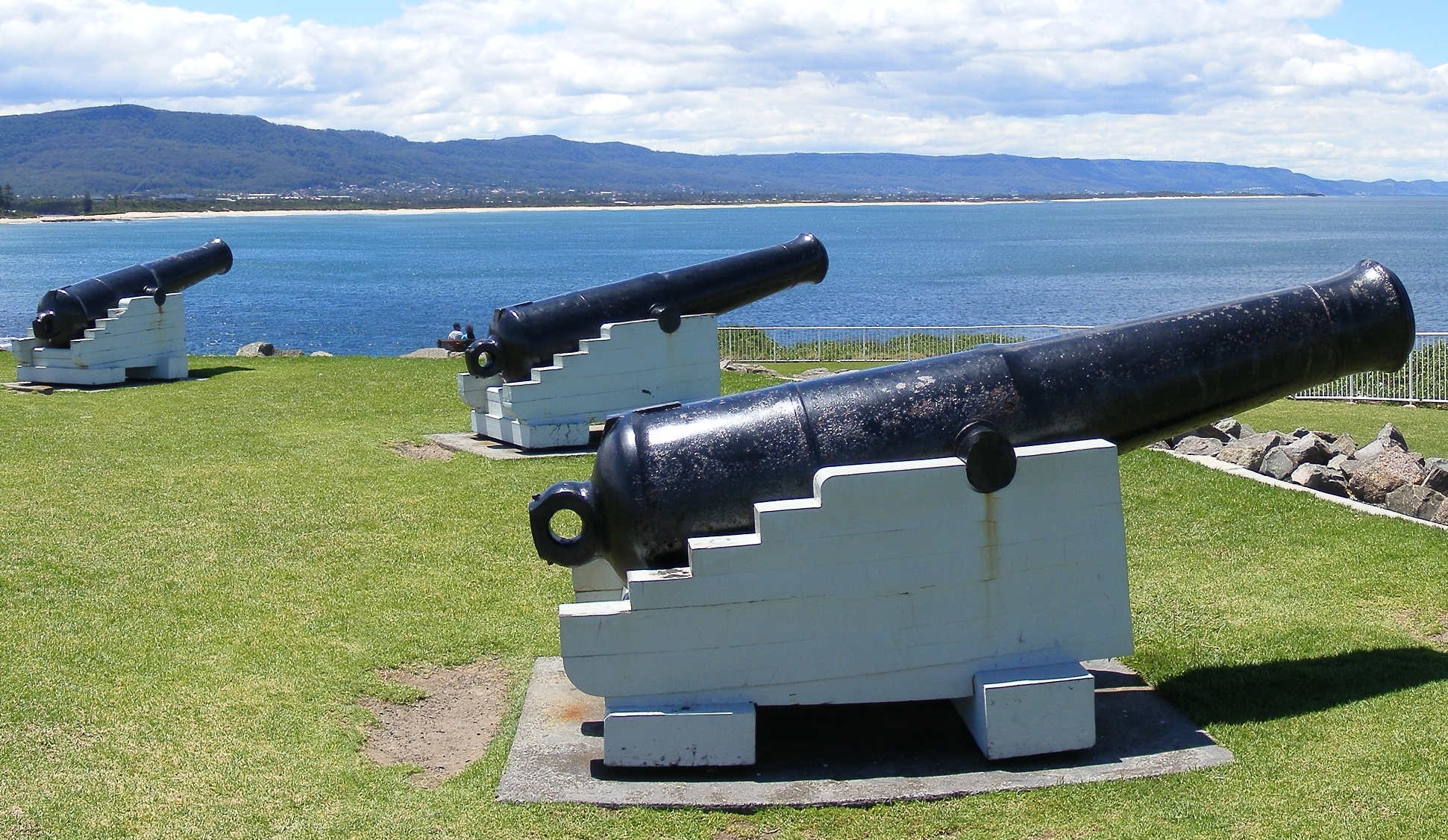
3 SBML 68-pounder guns at Flagstaff Hill Fort

Flagstaff Hill Fort is a former military fort at Flagstaff Point, Wollongong, New South Wales, Australia.

== History ==
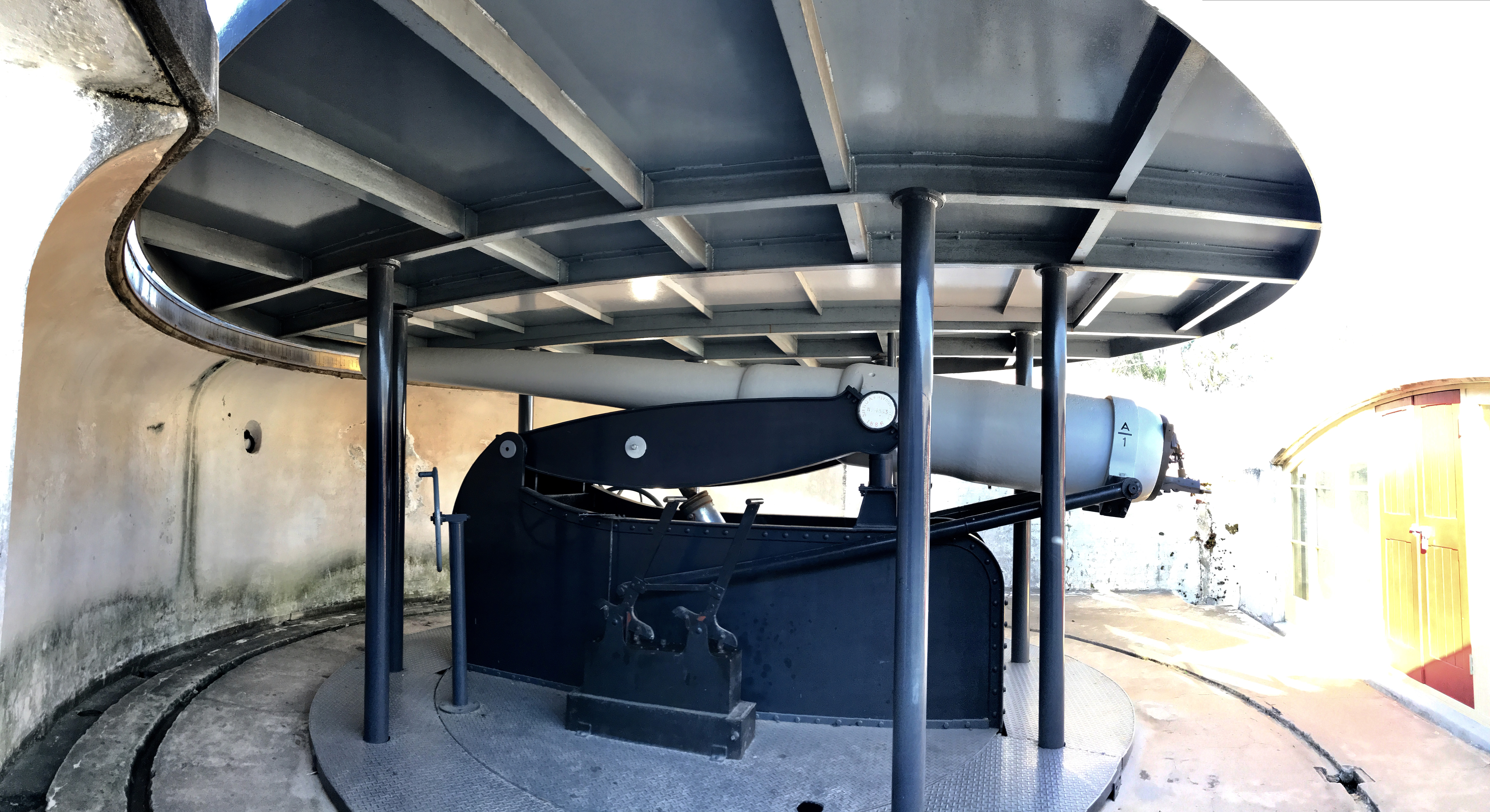
A similar 6-inch gun that was mounted at Fort Lytton.

In 1879 the steamship ‘Havilah’ landed three 4.6 tonne, 68-pounder cannon as part of Wollongong Harbour defences against the threat of possible Russian attack. The cannon were designed to fire a shell weighing 68 lb (31 kg) up to 1.60 km. They lay unused by the harbour for 18 months without mountings and ammunition. They were finally placed as an inner defense battery by the local volunteer artillery group in 1880. Endeavour Drive now covers the original position.

However, by the mid-1880s it became obvious that enemy cruisers could bombard the port out of range of these obsolete guns.

In 1890 a larger and more modern 6-inch gun was positioned in a concrete pit near the summit of Flagstaff Hill. Underground rooms protected the ammunition and the gunners. By 1893 further fortifications were completed on Smith's Hill west of Harbour.

Constructed between 1890 and 1891, the fort was built with a disappearing gun emplacement. The fort was dug-out of the hill using face brick walls and then earth was placed over the tunnels. The gun was commissioned and first fired in 1892. The gun emplacement was provided with two range finder positions.

The Wollongong Head Lighthouse was constructed near the fort in 1938.

== Armaments ==
- Muzzle Loaded 68 pound cannon (1880 to 1891)
- Breach Loaded 6-inch gun Mk V (150mm) gun (1891 to 1907)

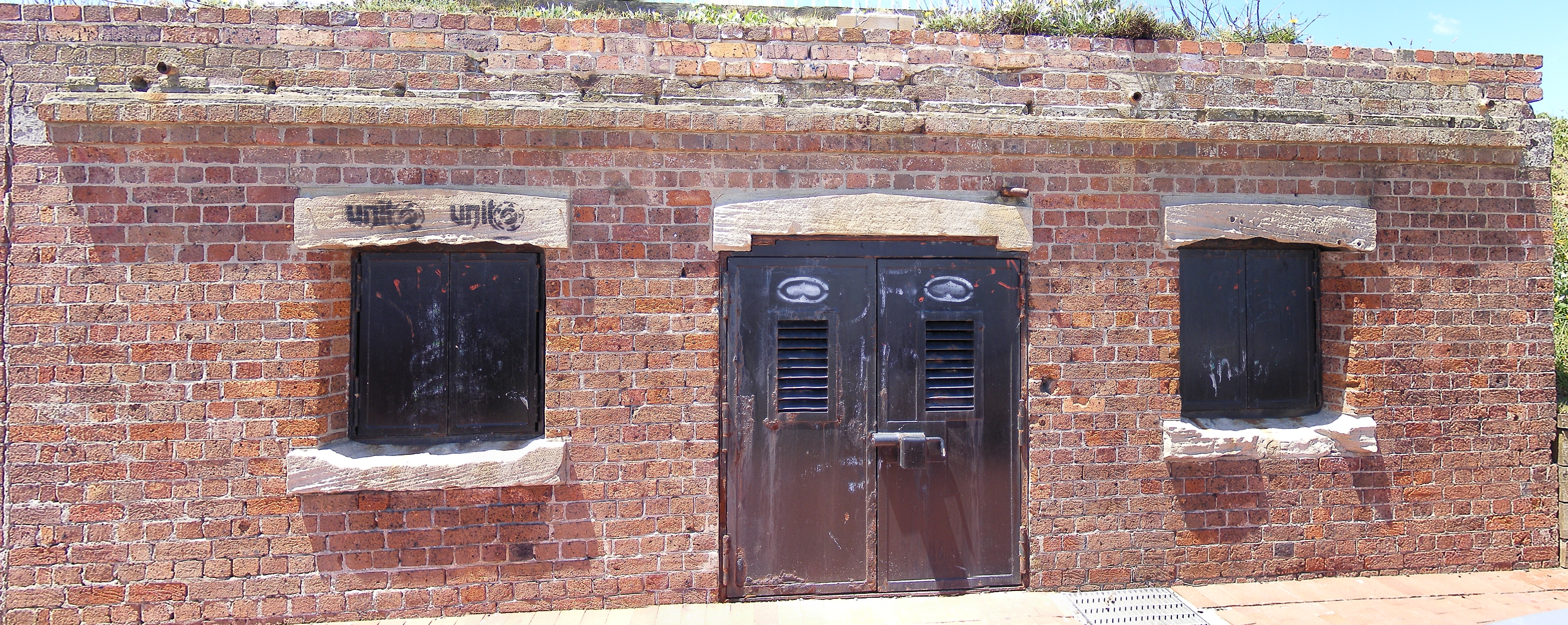
Main entrance

== See also ==
- Military history of Australia
- Map coordinates : 34°25′19.28″S 150°54′34.83″E

Media related to Flagstaff Hill Fort, Wollongong at Wikimedia Commons
