= Erpen =

Erpen is a surname. Notable people with the name include:

- Facundo Erpen (born 1983), Argentine footballer
- Horacio Erpen (born 1981), Argentine footballer

== See also ==
- Orpen
