= Adela Orpen =

Irish writer (1855–1927)

- Born: Adela Elizabeth Richards; 3 February 1855; Virginia, United States
- Died: 17 February 1927 (aged 72); Monksgrange House, County Wexford, Ireland
- Resting place: St Anne's Churchyard, Killanne, County Wexford
- Spouse: Goddard Henry Orpen
- Children: 2, including Edward

Adela Elizabeth Orpen (née Richards; 3 February 1855 – 17 February 1927) was an Irish writer.

== Early life ==
Adela Orpen was born Adela Elizabeth Richards on 3 February 1855, on a slave plantation in Virginia, United States. She was the only surviving child of Edward Moore Richards and his wife, Sarah Elizabeth (née Tisdale).

When her mother died on 19 February 1860 and following the death of her two siblings, she and her father moved to Kansas in 1862. This move was partly motivated by Kansas' incorporation into the federal union, as her father opposed slavery, and by the fact that the land he purchased was likely to be near the new route of the Santa Fé railway. Here, Orpen, her father, and her guardian, Adelia Sarah Gates, fully engaged in the frontier lifestyle, building a simple frame house, and managing horses and cattle.

While her father fought on the union side of the American Civil War, Orpen took on many of the responsibility for their land, even planning their evacuation if confederate side advanced. This childhood spent in isolation, with much required of her to survive on the frontier, is seen as having a strong influence on her life, and made her relationship with her father very close. She noted later on that he was: "Father, mother, playmate, friend … during those Kansas years … and the influence of his training has remained strong throughout my life."

== Move to Ireland ==
Orpen moved to Ireland in 1867, following her father's inheritance of the family estate Grange estate in Killanne, County Wexford. This was a result of the death of her father's older brother, John Francis Richards. Her paternal grandmother was still living there. Once again Orpen and her father were accompanied by Gates, who she called "Mamma", and Orpen spent the rest of her youth at Grange Demesne, later renamed Monksgrange House by her father. Her life in Ireland was more conventional than that of the United States, but her father maintained unusual interests. He took part in the campaign for women's dress reform as well as women's rights more generally, and provided his daughter was a stimulating environment to grow up in. The onset of the Land War in the 1870s saw their lives change significantly, both economically and politically. These changes saw both Orpen and her father change their political allegiances from liberal nationalism to supporting the British Conservative party.

It was the economic difficulties that arose from the withholding of rents that delayed her marriage to her first cousin once removed, Goddard Henry Orpen. Her father also resisted the marriage as he thought Goddard was financially inadequate, as he was only at the beginning of his career as a London barrister. They eventually married on 18 August 1880 at St. Peter's Church, Aungier Street, Dublin. Her husband described their marriage as "a perfect union."

== Writing career ==
The Orpens moved to the new London suburb of Bedford Park, where they had two children: Lilian Iris born in 1883 and Edward Richards born in 1884.

During this time, she established herself as an essay writer and novelist, with success from 1886 onwards. Her articles were published in London and New York journals, as well as three novels: Corrageen in '98: a story of the Irish rebellion in 1898, Perfection city in 1897, and The jay-hawkers: a story of free soil and border ruffian days in 1900.

Her most notable works are non-fiction and are biographical and autobiographical: The chronicles of the Sid; or, The life and travels of Adelia Gates in 1893, and Memories of the old emigrant days in Kansas, 1862–1865 in 1926.

Her writing career ended at its pinnacle in 1900, when her father transferred the Monksgrange estate to Orpen and she decided to devote herself to its management completely. She moved there with her husband, who had given up his career at the London bar and had become an historian.

== Later life ==
In 1923, the house at Monksgrange was raided by republicans during the Irish Civil War, apparently Orpen avoiding being shot on one occasion with a quick verbal rejoinder. Toward the end of her life she was very disappointed in the political developments in Ireland, and became hostile towards England for what she viewed as its betrayal of Ireland. Like her father, Orpen was sceptical of religion, and in the 1911 census is listed as agnostic. She died on 17 February 1927 at Monksgrange, and is buried at St Anne's churchyard, Killann. Monksgrange still holds an extensive collection of her books, as well as manuscripts of her articles and books.
