= Wollongong Head Lighthouse =

Lighthouse in New South Wales, Australia

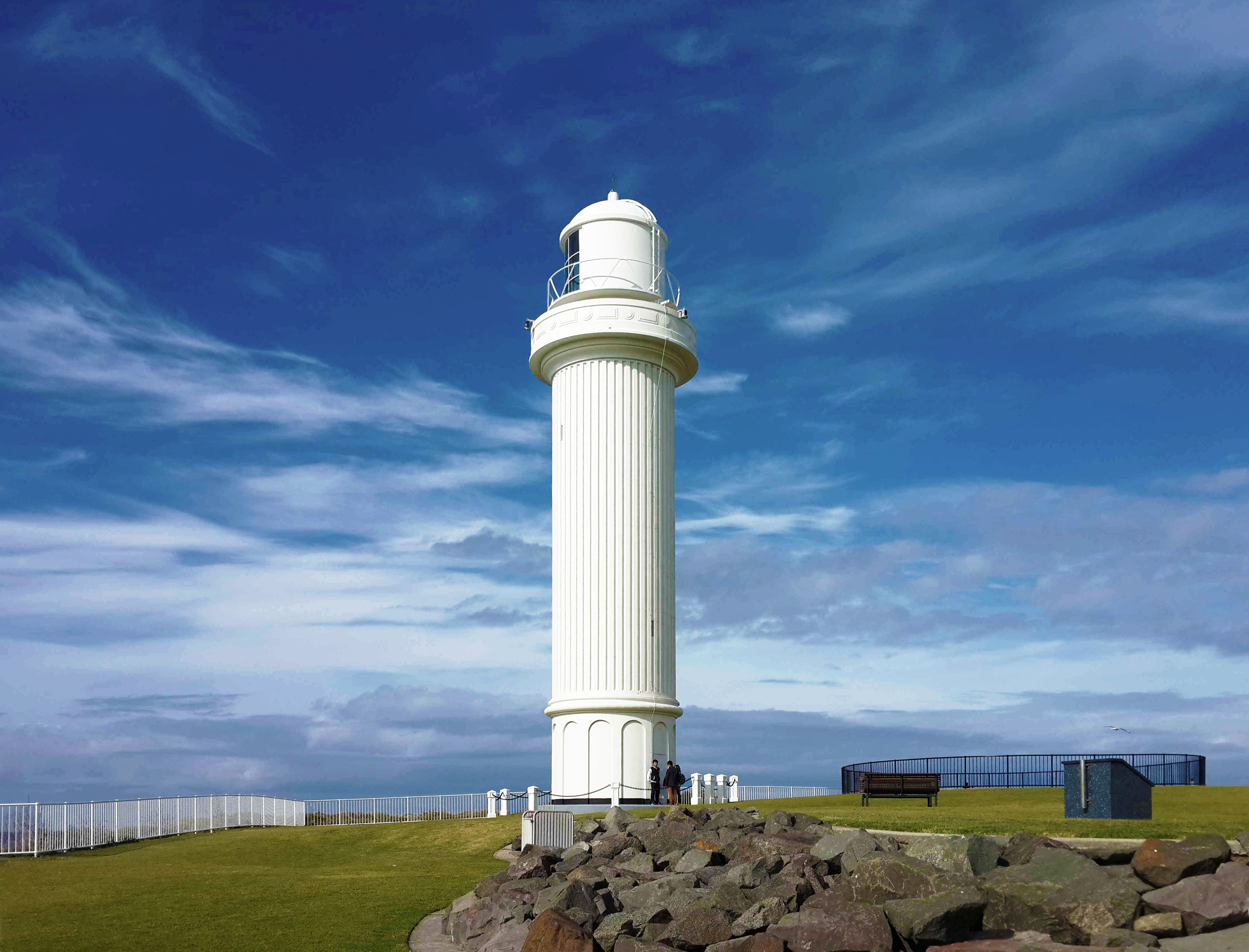
- Wollongong Head Lighthouse
- Location: Flagstaff Point, Wollongong, New South Wales, Australia
- Coordinates: 34°25′19″S 150°54′35″E

Tower
- Constructed: 1936
- Construction: Reinforced concrete tower
- Automated: 1936
- Height: 25.3 metres (83 ft)
- Shape: Fluted cylindrical tower with balcony and lantern
- Markings: White tower and lantern
- Operator: Australian Maritime Safety Authority

Light
- Focal height: 40 metres (130 ft)
- Light source: Mains power
- Intensity: White: 70,000 cd red: 17 000 cd
- Range: 19 nautical miles (35 km; 22 mi)
- Characteristic: Oc W 6s. red light towards shallow waters

The Wollongong Head Lighthouse, also known as Flagstaff Hill Lighthouse or Flagstaff Point Light, is an active lighthouse located adjacent to the heritage-listed Wollongong Harbour precinct in Wollongong, a coastal city south of Sydney, New South Wales, Australia. It overlooks the Tasman Sea from the top of Flagstaff Point, directly east of the city centre. Wollongong is the only place in the east of Australia to have two lighthouses located in close proximity of each other, the other being Wollongong Breakwater Lighthouse.

Wollongong Harbour is home to private vessels and the local fishing fleet in its inner Belmore Basin. South of the city is Port Kembla, a major steelmaking, minerals, grain and vehicle handling harbour. A further hazard to shipping is an island group known collectively as The Five Islands lying a short distance off the coast.

== History ==
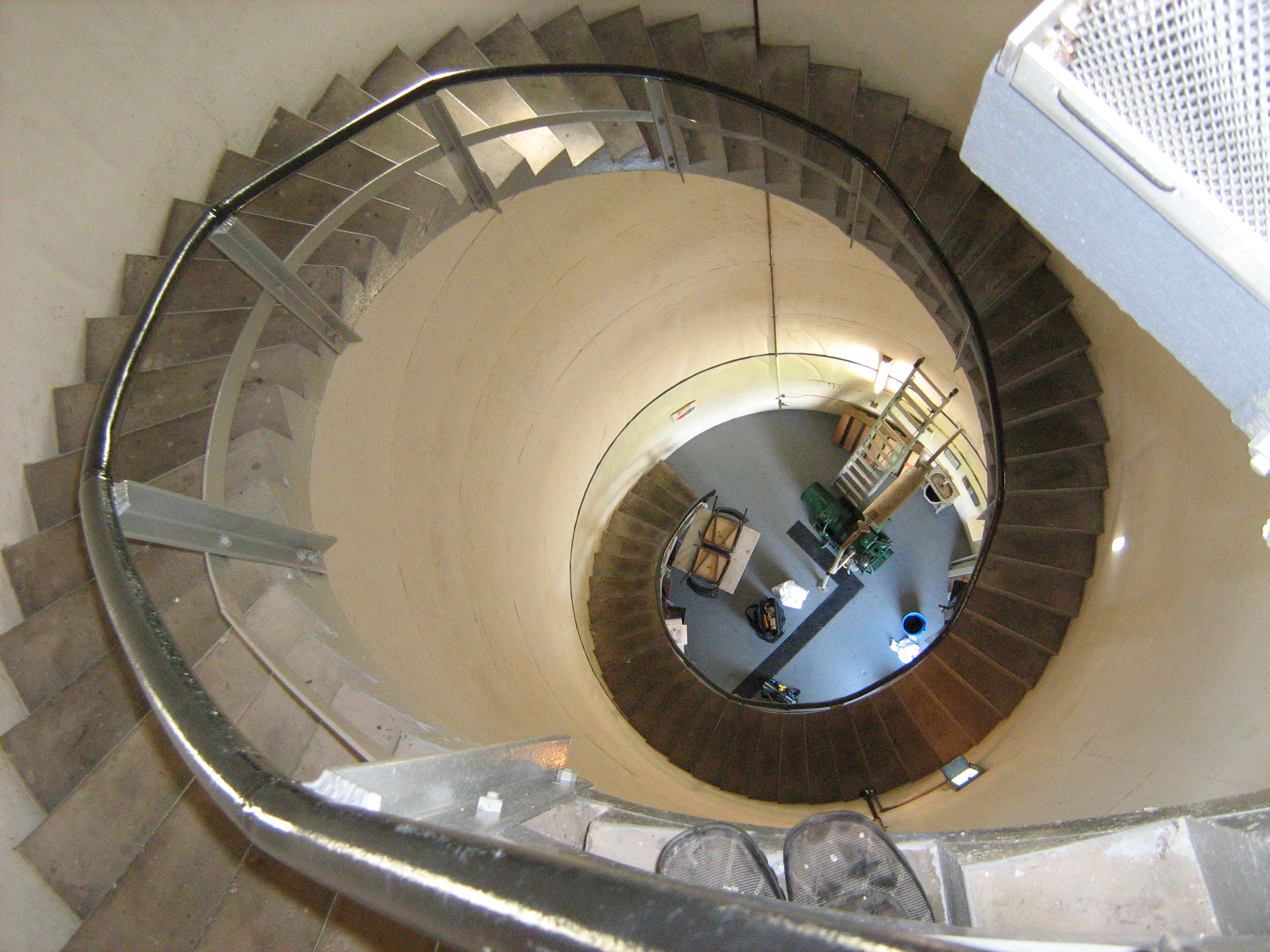
Stairway at Wollongong Head Lighthouse

Built by the Department of Shipping and Transport in 1936 to guide maritime traffic into Port Kembla Harbour located to the south. It was not only the first new lighthouse in New South Wales since 1903 but also the first to install fully automatic flashing lights. The tower is constructed of reinforced concrete to withstand the strong winds and splashing waves where it stands on the eastern side of Flagstaff Point.

The light is coloured white and red. White with a 4.5 second duration is visible through 100 degrees, while red is visible through 80 degrees. The latter indicates the presence of shallow water. Three 68-pounder cannons (now defunct) were installed near its base in 1879 to repel any possible attacks by the Russian navy. It finally became the sole functioning lighthouse at Flagstaff Point when the old Wollongong Lighthouse situated only a few hundred metres away on the Belmore Basin to the north was discontinued in 1974.

On 7 January 2000, the Wollongong Head Lighthouse was listed as a local government heritage building for being the first fully automatic electric lighthouse in Australia.

Due to its vantage point, it is a popular picnic-come-scenic spot by locals, visitors and campus students from the nearby University of Wollongong.

== See also ==
- List of lighthouses in Australia
