= Wollongong Breakwater Lighthouse =

Lighthouse in New South Wales, Australia

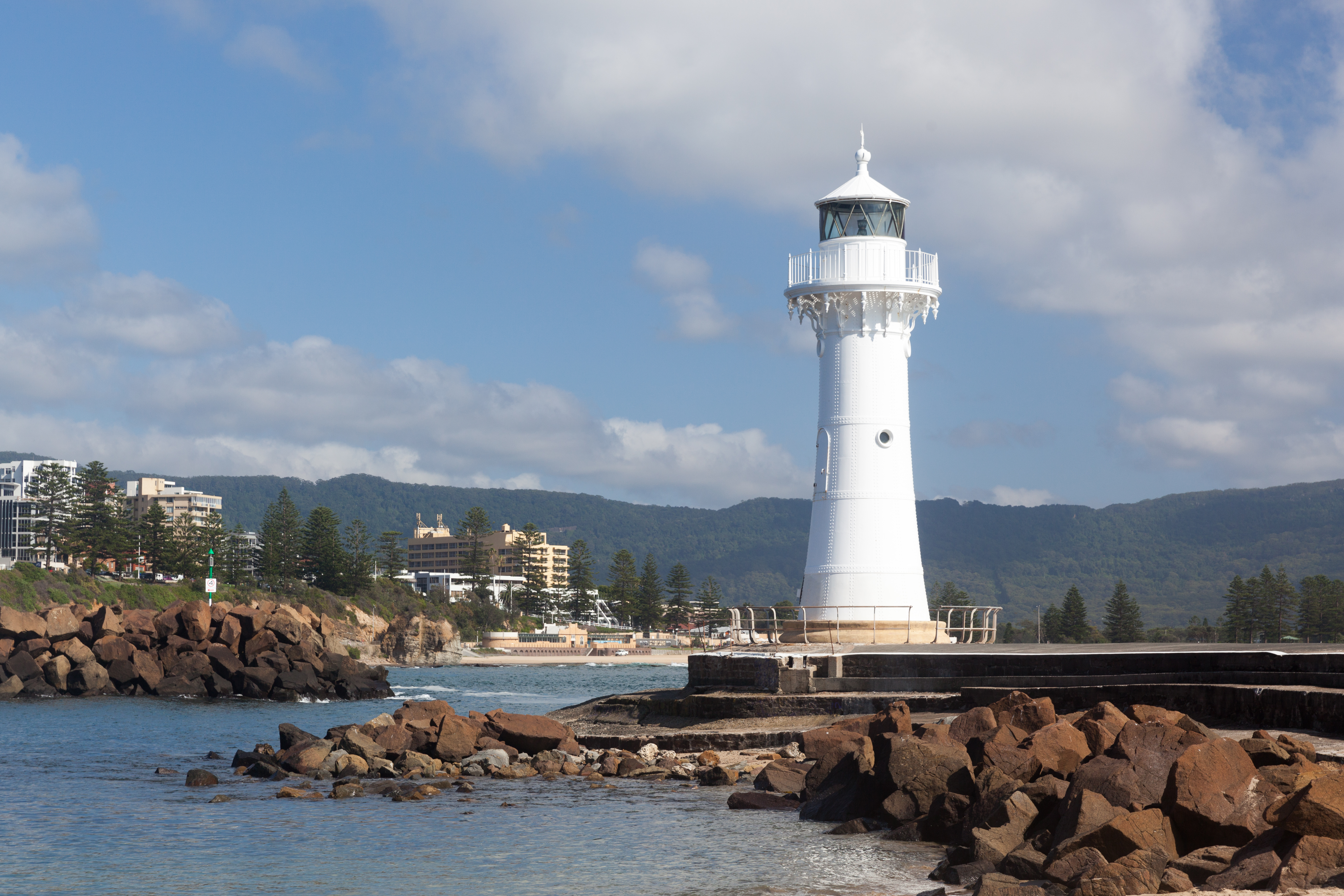
- Wollongong Breakwater Lighthouse
- Location: Belmore Basin, Wollongong, New South Wales, Australia
- Coordinates: 34°25′11″S 150°54′24″E

Tower
- Constructed: 1872
- Foundation: Ferro-concrete
- Construction: Wrought iron tower
- Height: 12.8 metres (42 ft)
- Shape: Tapered cylindrical tower with balcony and lantern
- Markings: White tower and lantern
- Operator: Transport for NSW

Light
- Deactivated: 1974
- Focal height: 17.1 metres (56 ft)
- Light source: Mains power
- Intensity: 1000 cd
- Range: 10 nautical miles (19 km; 12 mi)
- Characteristic: Fl (3) WR 20s.

Wollongong Breakwater Lighthouse, also known as Wollongong Harbour Lighthouse, is a historic lighthouse situated on the southern breakwater of the heritage-listed Wollongong Harbour, in Wollongong, New South Wales in Australia. Wollongong is the only place in the east of Australia to have two lighthouses located in close proximity of each other, the other being Wollongong Head Lighthouse. While no longer used, the lighthouse was restored in 2002 as operational and is listed an official local heritage building.

The Wollongong Harbour is home to private vessels and the local fishing fleet in the inner Belmore Basin. South of the city lies Port Kembla, a major steelmaking, minerals, grain and vehicle handling harbour. A further hazard to shipping is an island group known collectively as The Five Islands lying a short distance off the coast.

== History ==
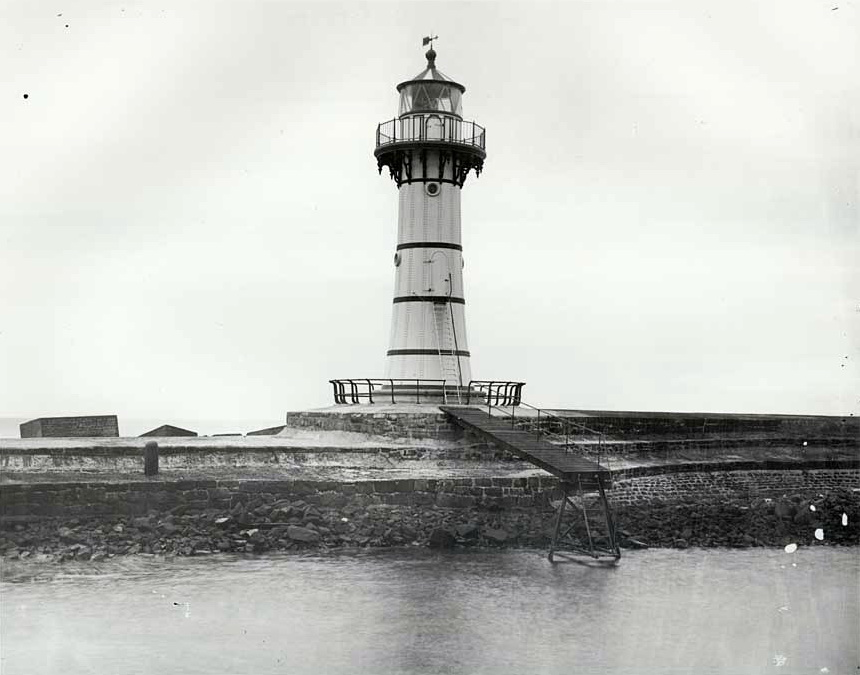
Historic view of the lighthouse

The Wollongong Breakwater Lighthouse, known affectionately by the locals as Old Wollongong Lighthouse, was built in 1871 after an earlier request made by the Wollongong Borough Council in 1866 to help mariners safely navigate the port of Wollongong in the early days of the coal industry in the Illawarra region. It is situated on the southern breakwater, within walking distance to its newer twin, the Wollongong Head Lighthouse.

Designed by Edward Orpen Moriarty MA MInstCE, the Engineer-in-Chief of Harbours and Rivers Department, the tower is constructed of wrought iron on a ferro-concrete base to survive any gale force weather in the area. It is one of the two towers in New South Wales made from wrought iron plates—another identical one, Warden Head Light, was built at Ulladulla Breakwater which later moved to Warden Head. Its construction was delayed by heavy seas which the tower did survive through. Until the lighthouse came into service, a temporary red light was fixed in a box at the end of the pier. Its lantern was installed in July 1871 but its light was not exhibited regularly until January 1872.

=== Neglect and restoration ===
In 1937, a second lighthouse, Wollongong Head Lighthouse, was constructed on Flagstaff Point to the south of the Breakwater.

Due to poor maintenance of the wrought iron plates in later years, its support fixtures and foundation had deteriorated so much that the Breakwater Lighthouse was considered unsafe and slated for demolition in the 1970s, consequently the Wollongong Head Lighthouse took over as the primary lighthouse for the harbour in 1974 when it was deactivated.

In 1974, the Wollongong community called for its retention and local organisations subsequently contributed to its restoration then and again in 2002. The old lighthouse has become an icon of Wollongong for its part played in its history and is often depicted on its tourist brochures and even appears as an emblem on the pocket of a local high school uniform.

Though the Wollongong Breakwater Lighthouse is decommissioned now, it was restored to being fully functional and its lights are relit to mark special maritime occasions nowadays.

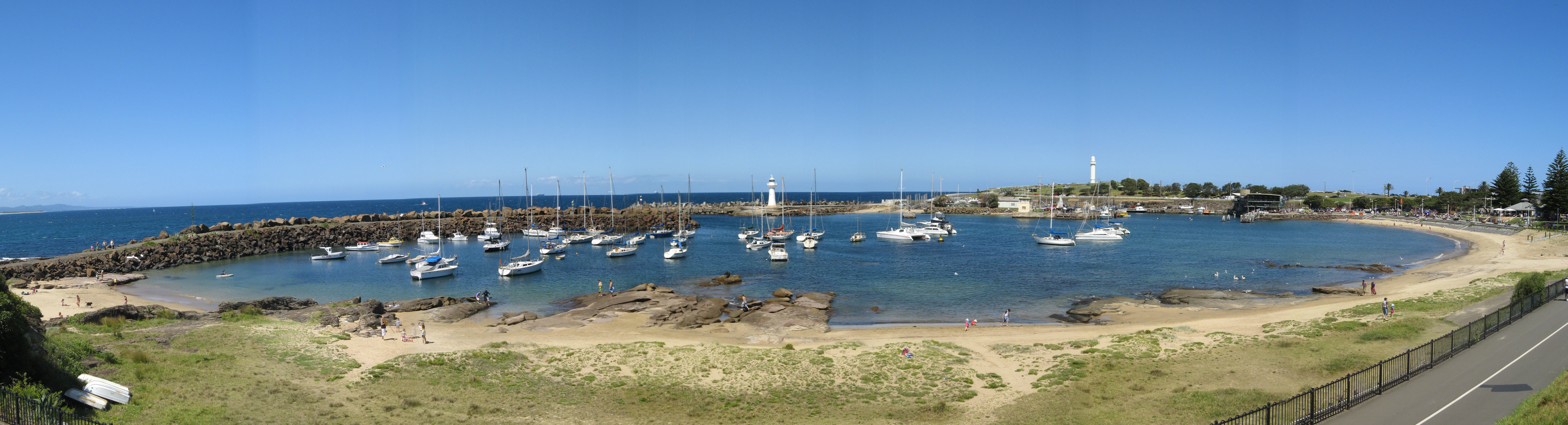
Overlooking Wollongong Harbour towards Flagstaff Point. Wollongong Breakwater Lighthouse is in the centre, while Wollongong Head Lighthouse is visible to the right.

== Local heritage listing ==
The Wollongong Breakwater Lighthouse was listed as a local government heritage building on 7 January 2000, and was noted of being of local significance for being 'Australia's first prefabricated steel lighthouse, and illustrative of early achievements in prefabrication and in the application of the new technology to the new building tasks of that era.'

== See also ==
- List of lighthouses in Australia
- Agnes (1849)
