= Edward Orpen Moriarty =

Australian civil engineer (1822–1896)

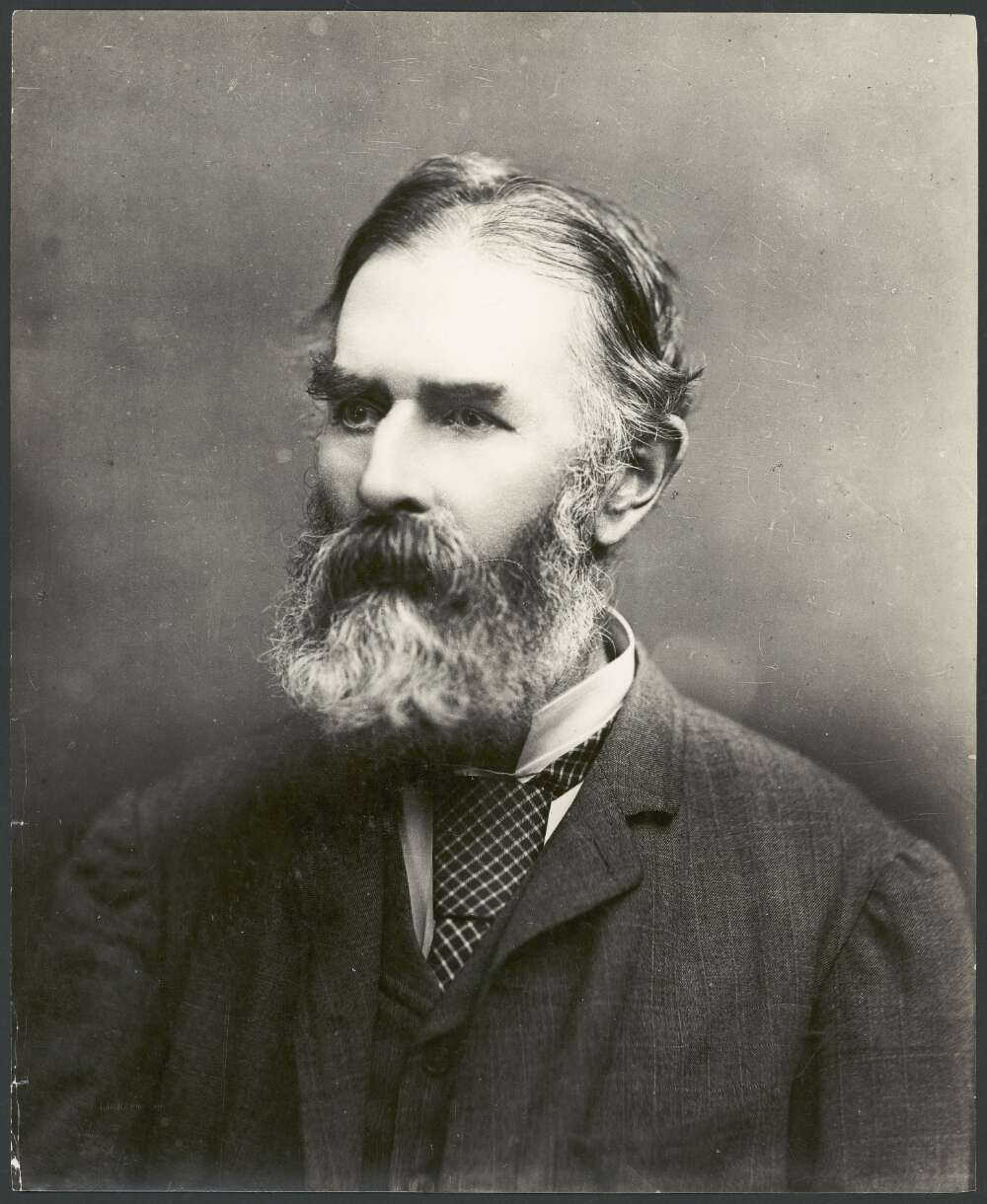
- Born: 14 October 1822; Kilgarvan, County Kerry, Ireland
- Died: 18 September 1896 (aged 73); Southsea, Hampshire,
- Education: Trinity College Dublin
- Spouse: Leila Helen Geary (1853–1896)
- Parent(s): Merion Marshall Moriarty; Annie Orpen
- Engineering career
- Discipline: civil engineer
- Projects: Newcastle Harbour, Clarence River entrance

Edward Orpen Moriarty (1822–1896) MInstCE was an Australian civil engineer, who undertook a number of important public works in New South Wales in the late nineteenth century.

== Personal life and education ==
Moriarty was born in County Kerry, Ireland, the second son of Commander Merion Moriarty, R.N. Staying behind to complete his education when his parents migrated to Australia, he completed a Bachelor of Arts and then Master of Arts at Trinity College, Dublin, was engaged as a cadet on the construction of the Isle of Portland breakwater and became a member of the Institution of Civil Engineers.

He was articled as a pupil to William Morgan (inventor of the feathering float for paddle-steamers), in the firm of Acraman, Morgan and Company, in Bristol, during which he assisted with the design and construction of a number of steamships including “Little Western”, “Avon”, “Severn”, and a large steam yacht built for the Austrian Government, the “Archduke Frederick”. Moriarty then worked under Sir John Macneill on railways back in Ireland, and passed the examination for County Surveyor in the Board of Works.

In 1848, he migrated to New South Wales, initially being employed as an assistant in the Surveyor-General's Department, undertaking survey work in Queensland under Sir Thomas Mitchell. In 1852, he commenced private engineering practice in Sydney. Moriarty married Leila Helen Geary in Brisbane on 18 May 1853.

== Engineering career ==
Between 1853 and 1855, he held the position of engineer and surveyor for the Steam Navigation Board, and from 1855 to 1858 was engineer on the Hunter River improvements. He was then appointed Engineer-in-Chief for Harbours and River Navigation with the NSW Department of Works from 1858 to 1859. While in the military, in the 1850s (and with approval), he undertook external commissions for the Penrith Nepean Bridge Co. and the first Pyrmont Bridge in 1866.

In 1855, Morarity was Engineer Surveyor for the Hunter River improvements and in that capacity made soundings and mapped the Hunter River at the Port of Newcastle, which were developed into a plan to improve the entrance to the sea by constructing extended breakwaters and river control walls as well as to develop the port facilities to improve the export of coal (Stewart 1983). In particular, Morarity is noted for his involvement in the construction of the Dyke a river training wall on the western bank of the Hunter river at Newcastle which was developed into a coal loading facility and basin equipped with hydraulic cranes for loading coal and an associated rail link.

In 1862, Moriarty was made commissioner for roads and engineer-in-chief. He was a Sydney Water Supply Commissioner in 1868, president of the Hunter River Floods Commission in 1869–70, and also responsible for water supply schemes for Albury, Bathurst, Hunter Valley towns, Wagga Wagga and Wollongong.

Moriarty was made responsible for the Clarence River Entrance Works between 1862 and 1889, during which he proposed short breakwaters and rock training walls. However, this was not entirely successful as sandbars formed near the opening. Moriarty argued with the harbour engineer John Coode about the cause and remedy, but when Moriarty went on leave prior to his retirement, his successor, C.W. Darley, implemented Coode's scheme. Part of the remaining north training wall is still called “Moriarty’s Wall” in recognition of his role.

== Personal interests ==
Moriarty design for the Iron Wharf, Sydney

Moriarty also had a military career as a lieutenant in the Volunteer Artillery and as a captain from 1869. He was also involved in the board for inspecting and maintaining the supply of colonial warlike stores, the commission on defence from foreign aggression, and was a Captain of the Engineers Corps Volunteer Rifles in 1871–73.

Outside of professional activities, Moriarty was also a Philosophical Society councillor, a member of the New South Wales Linnean Society, and a member of the Royal Sydney Yacht Squadron. He retired from engineering positions on 31 December 1888 and returned to England, where he died at Southsea, Hampshire, on 18 September 1896, leaving an estate worth £5800.

== Engineering works ==
- Lake Parramatta Dam 1855
- Clarence River entrance 1862
- Richmond River entrance
- Morts Dock Balmain
- Sutherland Dock, Cockatoo Island Dockyard
- first Pyrmont Bridge
- Upper Nepean Water Supply Scheme
- Newcastle Harbour
- Prospect scheme of water supply for Sydney
- Kiama Light 1887
- Warden Head Light Ulladulla 1873
- Wollongong Breakwater Lighthouse 1871
- Trial Bay breakwater 1877–1903
- Grey River entrance, New Zealand, 1874
- Moyne River Training Walls. Port Fairy, 1869–74
- Tathra Wharf
- Western Springs water supply to Auckland, New Zealand

== Publications ==
- Moriarty, E. O. (Edward Orpen); Allan & Wigley; New South Wales. Parliament. Legislative Assembly. Select Committee on Deepening the River Hunter. Final report. Appendix 1 (1857), Plan of the Port of Newcastle and part of the Hunter River, Allan & Wigley
- Moriarty, E. O. (Edward Orpen); New South Wales. Government Printing Office (1870), Plan of part of the Hunter River showing flooded districts from Oakhampton to Tomago, Photo-lithographed at the Govt. Printing Office
- Moriarty, E. O. (Edward Orpen) (1874), Report on the proposed improvement of the Grey River, S.T. Leigh & Co
- Moriarty, E. O. (Edward Orpen); New South Wales. Harbours and Rivers Dept (1890), Plan of Cockatoo Island and approaches shewing graving docks &c, Photolithographed at the Govt. Printing Office
- Moriarty, E. O. (Edward Orpen); Moriarty, E. O. (Edward Orpen), 1825–1896; Allan & Wigley; Pyrmont Bridge Company (1857), A plan of part of Sydney and its environs: showing the bridges and roads to be constructed by the Pyrmont Bridge Company, Allan & Wigley
