= Goddard Henry Orpen =

Irish historian (1852–1932)

Goddard Henry Orpen (8 May 1852 – 15 May 1932) was an Irish historian. He attended The Abbey School, Tipperary and graduated from Trinity College Dublin.

Orpen was the son of Dr. John Herbert Orpen (1805–1888) and Ellen Susanna Gertude Richards (?–1855) and a second cousin of artist Sir William Orpen. He married his first cousin once removed, Adela Elizabeth Richards, on 18 August 1880.

Orpen's main work was Ireland under the Normans, a four-volume work of a total of c. 1500 pages, first published by Clarendon Press 1911–20, and then reissued in 1968. Ireland under the Normans generated political controversy when it was published, as Orpen "affronted many fellow Irishmen with his contrast between Ireland’s ‘progress, vigour and comparative order’ under Anglo-Norman rule, and ‘retrogression, stagnation, and comparative anarchy’ under ‘the recrudescence of Celtic tribalism’ in the two centuries after 1333". A new one-volume edition was published by Four Courts Press in 2005. He also edited and translated The Song of Dermot and the Earl in 1892.

Orpen died a widower at Monksgrange House, Grange Demesne, County Wexford, on 15 May 1932, aged 80.

== See also ==
- Eoin MacNeill
- Edmund Curtis
- James Lydon (historian)
