= Port Kembla harbour =

Port in Australia

Port Kembla
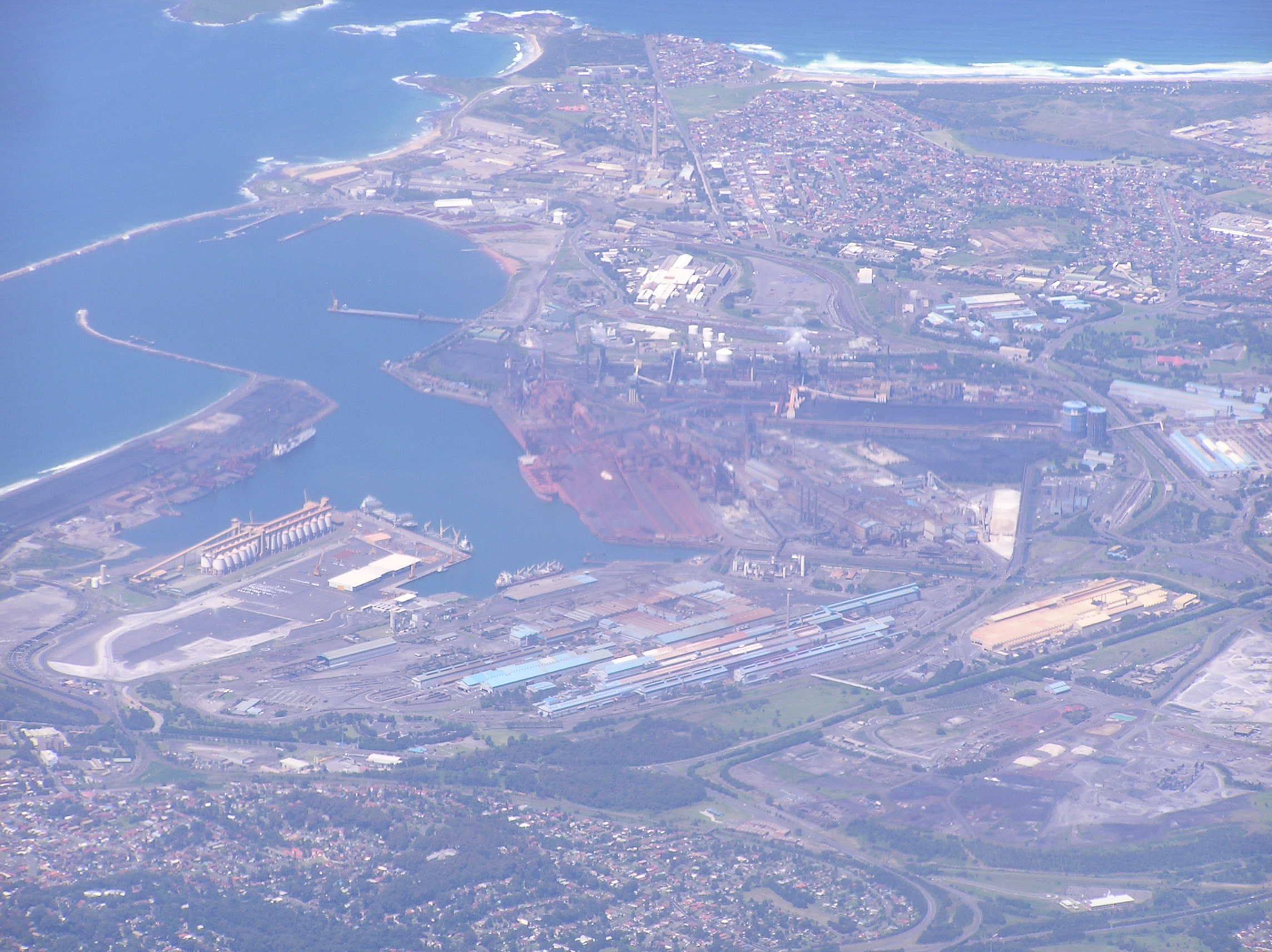
- An aerial view of Port Kembla Harbour, looking southeast, 2008
- Interactive map of Port Kembla
- Location within Australia

Location
- Location: Port Kembla, New South Wales
- Coordinates: 34°28′09″S 150°54′28″E
- UN/LOCODE: AUPKL

Details
- Size of harbour: 1.4 km^{2} (0.54 sq mi)
- No. of berths: 18
- Draft depth: 16.25 m.

Port Kembla harbour
- Location within New South Wales
- Location: Illawarra, New South Wales
- Coordinates: 34°28′09″S 150°54′28″E
- Lake type: Cargo port
- Primary outflows: Tasman Sea, South Pacific Ocean
- Catchment area: 6.3 km^{2} (2.4 sq mi)
- Basin countries: Australia
- Managing agency: Port Authority of New South Wales
- Surface area: 1.4 km^{2} (0.54 sq mi)
- Average depth: 6.1 m (20 ft)
- Water volume: 8,439,000 m^{3} (298,000,000 cu ft)
- Frozen: never
- Settlements: Wollongong, Port Kembla

Port Kembla is a man-made cargo port or artificial harbour, with an outer harbour protected by breakwaters and an inner harbour constructed by dredging, located in the Illawarra region of New South Wales, Australia. Activities within the port are managed by the Port Authority of New South Wales.

== Location and features ==
Located to the east of the Wollongong suburb of Port Kembla, the harbour of Port Kembla comprises a 8,439 megalitres (298.0×10^{6} cu ft) body of water with a surface area of 1.4 square kilometres (0.54 sq mi) at a dredged average depth of 6.1 metres (20 ft) drawn from a catchment area of 6.3 square kilometres (2.4 sq mi).

The port of Port Kembla was established in the late 1890s to facilitate the export of coal from the mines of the Illawarra region. Diversification of the port facilities during the late-1980s and since, has seen the port to include general and break bulk cargoes, containers and motor vehicle imports, and bulk grain exports.

Regulation of the port rests with a number of federal, state, and local government agencies including the Australian Maritime Safety Authority, the New South Wales Environment Protection Authority, and Wollongong City Council.

== History of the Port ==
=== Outer Harbour ===
In 1898, Port Kembla was selected for further development as the main port for the Illawarra region. Between 1901 and 1937, first an eastern breakwater and then a northern breakwater was constructed, resulting in a large protected and safe anchorage now known as the 'Outer Harbour'. The eastern breakwater extended from the rocky headland and the northern breakwater extended from the beach at a point just south of where Tom Thumb Lagoon and Allen's Creek emptied into the sea. An advantage of Port Kembla over other potential sites for a port—Wollongong, Bellambi, and Lake Illawarra—was that there was suitable stone for the breakwaters nearby and that the first part of the eastern breakwater could be placed on an existing natural reef extending seaward from the rocky headland. Work was well underway on the eastern breakwater by mid-1902.

==== Coal Jetties (1883-1963) ====
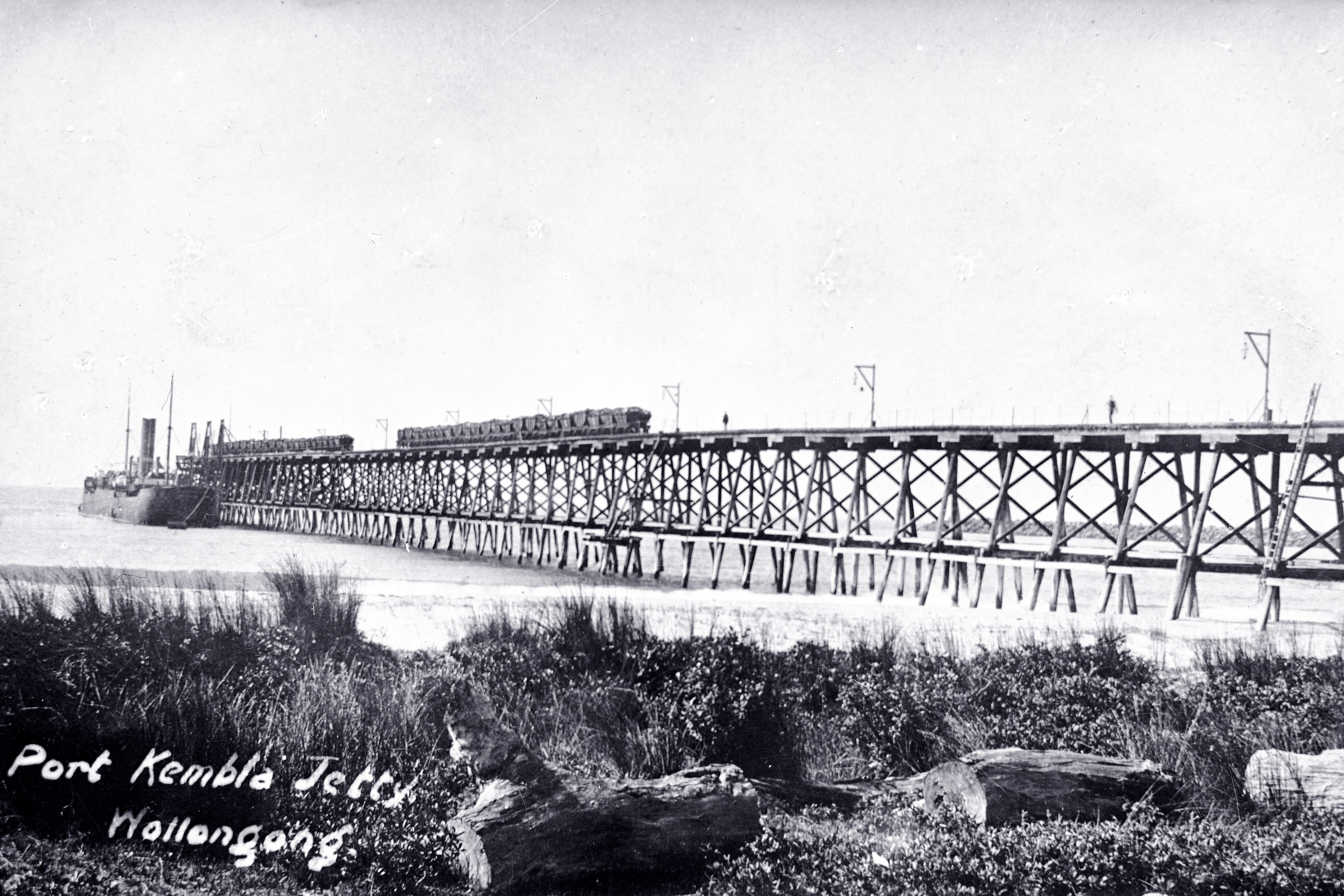
Mount Kembla Mine's jetty, Port Kembla, 1883.

From 1883, coal was shipped from an ocean jetty on the beach just to the north of a rocky headland lying to the north of Red Point and Boiler's Point. Old maps, from the 19th-century, show this rocky headland as "Red Point". Today, Red Point is the headland further south, directly opposite the Five Islands, which the older maps refer to as 'Five Islands Point'. Red Point and the Five Islands provided some protection from southerly weather. This new port was named Port Kembla, after the Mount Kembla mine from where the coal was transported by rail.

A second jetty belonged to the Southern Coal Company and was opened in 1887. It loaded coal sent by rail from the company's mine on the south face of Mount Kembla, behind Unanderra, and from another mine that it purchased, the Corrimal Colliery. This second jetty used a sophisticated loading arrangement capable of loading 300 tons/hour, which was greater than the capacity of the conventional jetty loading arrangements of the time. The Southern Coal Company wharf was located north of the Mount Kembla wharf.

After Port Kembla was selected for further development as the main port for the Illawarra region, the two existing coal wharves and 496.5 acres of foreshore land were acquired by the government—during 1900 and 1901—but the companies were allowed to continue to use their former wharves pending a public tender.

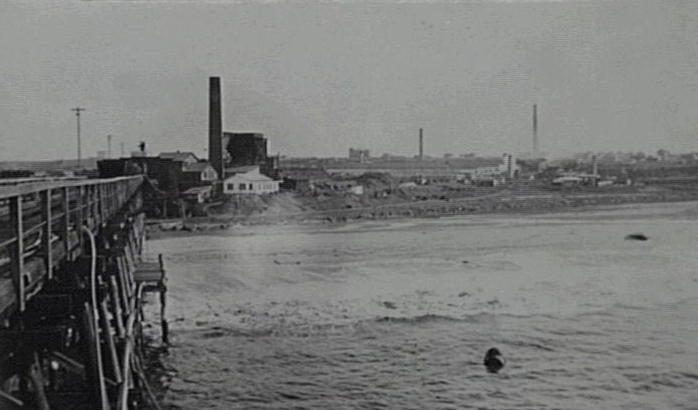
View of Port Kembla from No.1 Coal Jetty in 1919. The closest chimney is the power station supplying the electrically-powered equipment on the jetty

In its earlier years—much like the other ocean jetty coal ports—Port Kembla's two coal jetties were exposed to rough seas during bad weather. The new breakwaters of the Outer Harbour not only provided a reliably safe anchorage but also protected the jetties structures from damage.

In 1906, the North Bulli Company won the right to use Port Kembla to ship its coal, dooming its Hick's Point Jetty at Austinmer. At the time, the Southern Coal Jetty was the only jetty on the southern coalfields capable of loading large ocean-going vessels. The Southern Coal Co.—having lost the tender —was forced to ship much of its coal via the Mt Kembla Wharf and via Bellambi.

A new coal jetty was built to the north of the two existing coal jetties. The coal loading equipment and jetty was designed by the NSW Department of Public Works under the direction of Ernest de Burgh and constructed by contractors Kelly & Lewis in 1914. The new coal jetty opened in 1915 and became 'No.1 Jetty', the Southern Coal Jetty became No.2 Jetty, and the Mt Kembla Jetty became No.3 Jetty.

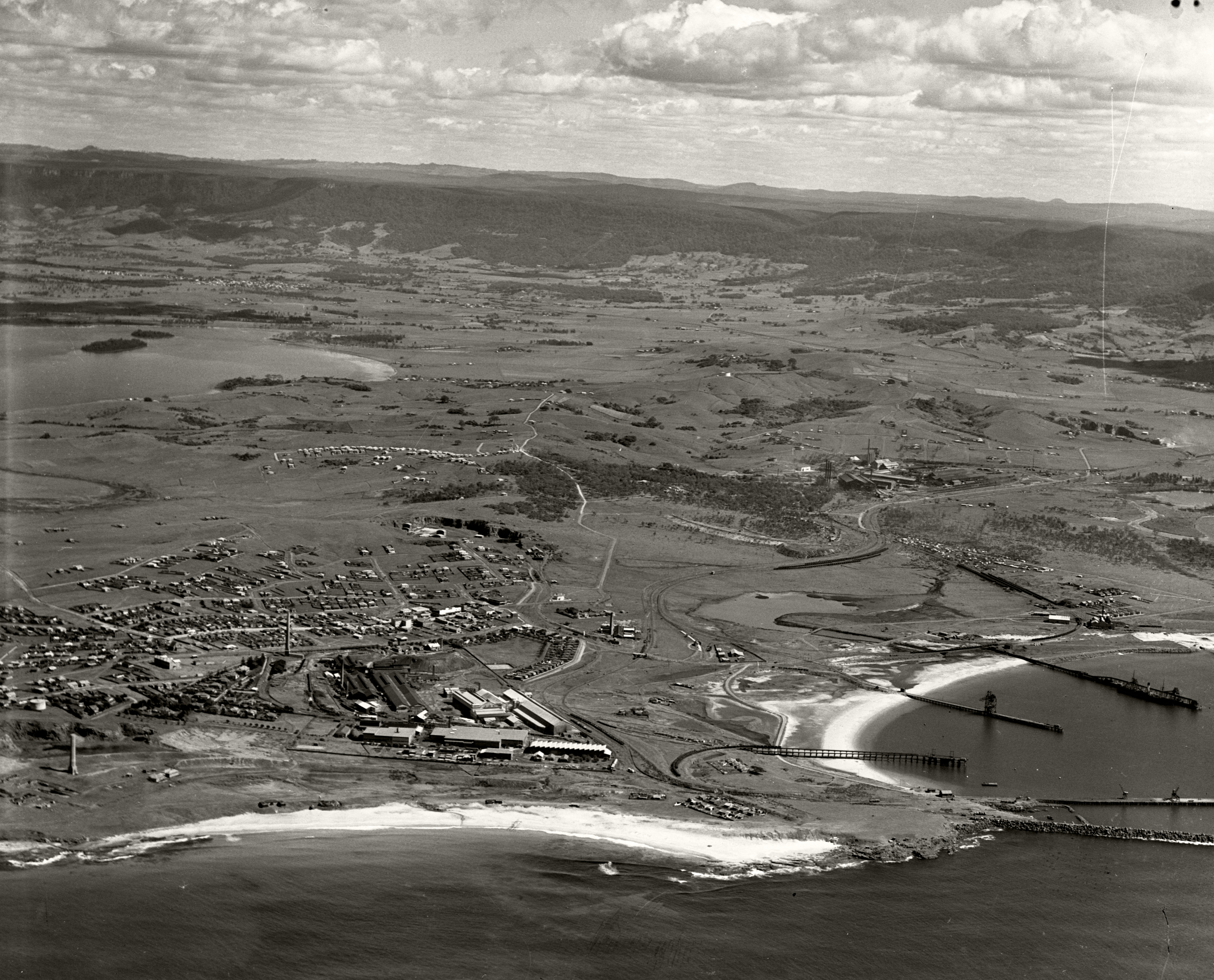
Port Kembla c.1936 - Clockwise around the Outer Harbour (on the right) are the eastern breakwater, No.4 Low-Level Wharf, No.3 (Coal) Jetty, AI&S Wharf, and No.1 (Coal) Jetty. No.2 Jetty (demolished 1925) previously stood at a location between those of the No.1 Jetty and the AI&S Wharf.

The new coal jetty was of an advanced and modern design for its time. Coal was transported from the mines in bottom-dump wagons. The coal was dumped into concrete bunkers, drawn out by a steel cross-flight conveyor and then carried out to the two movable loaders located on the jetty by an electrically powered conveyor belt. The two moveable loaders were also of a modern design, unlike the primitive chutes and staithes used up to that time. The moving loaders removed the need to shift the ship during the loading operation. Each loader had a boom conveyor and a chute. The No.1 Jetty was capable of a peak rate of 750 tons per hour but due to constraints on the speed at which vessels could be loaded and kept in trim, its realistic rate was an average about 520 tons per hour at most.

The No.2 Jetty had become unsafe and had fallen out of use by 1916. It was demolished as far back as the high-water line in 1925. The No.3 Jetty was still in use during the 1930s—its use confined to smaller vessels including sixty-milers—but by 1939 it was out of use and due to be demolished. That left the No.1 Jetty as the sole coal wharf at Port Kembla. By 1937, the No.1 Jetty was loading coal from all the southern mines that shipped coal by sea, except those mines still using Bellambi or Bulli Jetty. After 1952, Port Kembla was the only coal port on the southern coalfields.

The No.1 Jetty remained in service until it was replaced in 1963, by a new export coal loader located on the new 'Inner Harbour'. Port Kembla remains a major coal export port but no coal is now loaded in the Outer Harbour.

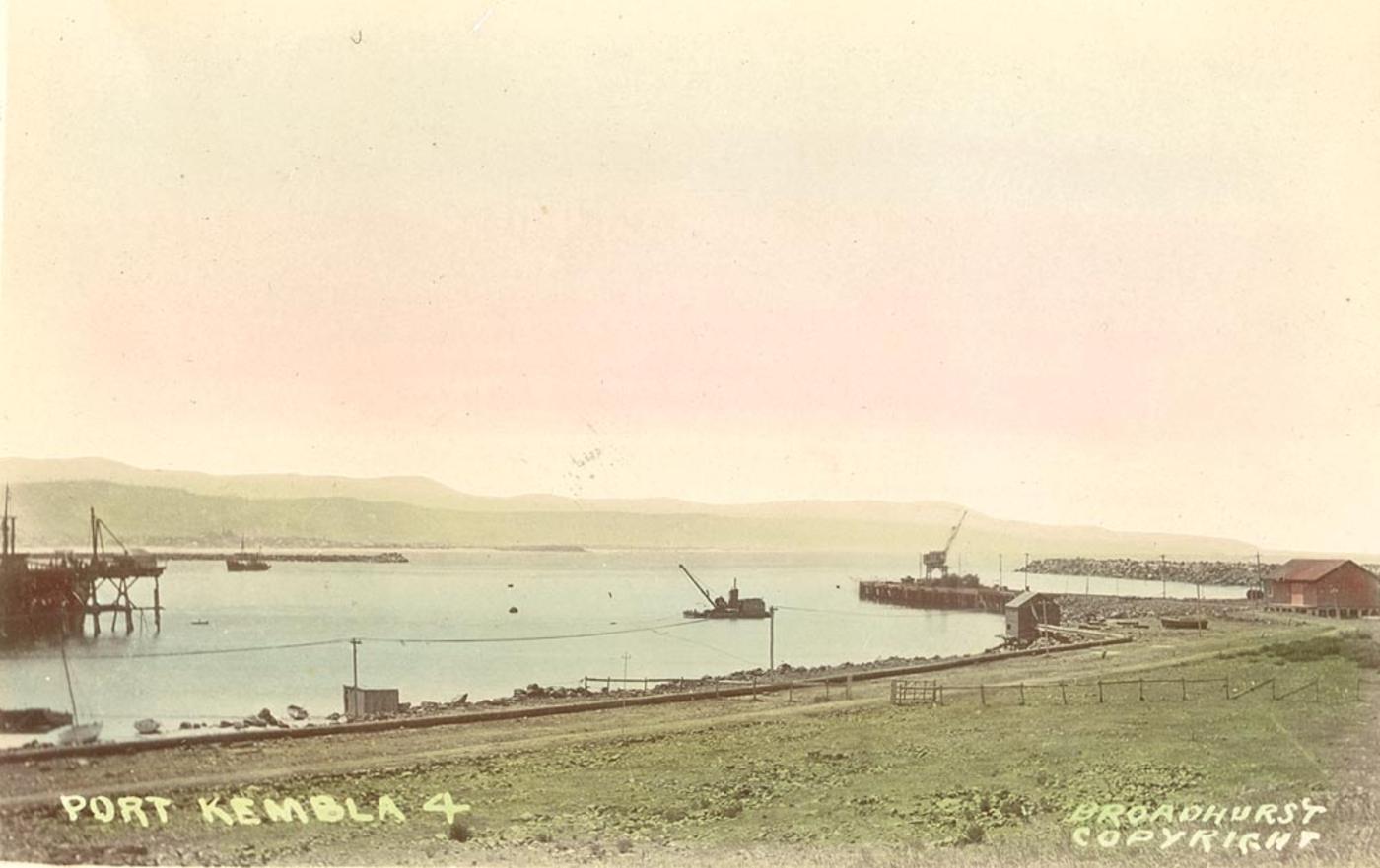
The eastern breakwater is on far right, next right is the No.4 Low Level Wharf. The structure on the left is the end of the No.3 (Coal) Jetty. The northern breakwater is visible in the left middle-distance

==== No.4 Low-Level Wharf ====
This wharf was originally built to service the Electrolytic Refining & Smelting Co. and Metal Manufacturers in 1908. It was the first wharf to be constructed at Port Kembla after the port was taken over by the government and was located between the No.3 Coal Jetty and the eastern breakwater. The jetty was extended in 1929. It had a connection to the government rail network and had two electric grab cranes suitable for unloading bulk cargoes. There is still a wharf at this location.

==== Australian Iron & Steel Wharf ====
A wharf was completed in 1928, on land leased by Australian Iron & Steel from the NSW Department of Public Works. It was located south of the No.1 (Coal) Jetty and south of the former location of No.2 (Coal) Jetty (demolished 1925).

The wharf was 838 feet long, including 323 feet of unloading berth. It had two railway lines and a pair of rails for the electrically-operated ore-unloading crane. This crane stood 101 feet above the wharf deck and weighed 400 tons. It could lift 20 tons at once, at a rate of 220 feet per minute, unloading 300 tons per hour.

The first shipment of iron ore for use in Australian Iron and Steel's new blast furnace was received from Whyalla, South Australia in 1928. The ore shipment of 5,500 tonnes had been mined by BHP at Iron Knob in the Middleback Ranges. In 1952 the first Yampi-class bulk carriers delivered iron ore to Port Kembla, carrying maximum loads of 11,000 tonnes. The AI&S wharf no longer exists, with all AI&S cargoes now using the berths of the Inner Harbour.

=== Inner Harbour ===
Planned expansion of the steelworks at Port Kembla necessitated that new port facilities be created adjacent to the area that would become the No.2 Steelworks.

In 1949, control of the port passed from the Public Works Department to the Maritime Services Board and the Department of Railways, and plans were in place by September 1951 for the construction of an 'inner harbour'.

The New South Wales State Government agreed to build the new 'inner harbour'. The Inner Harbour was created by dredging the former Tom Thumb Lagoon, beginning in January 1956, with the completion of the first stage of the new harbour in November 1960. The entrance to the new harbour was dredged to a depth of thirty-two feet to allow use by large ore-carriers. The first stage of the harbour was 1200 feet long.

==== Coal Terminal ====
Coal ship-loading operations were relocated from the 'outer harbour' to the 'inner harbour'. The first coal loader at the present site was commissioned in 1964 with a capacity of two million tonnes per annum. This had expanded to 7.2 million tonnes by the time the loader was replaced by the No. 2 Loader in 1982.

==== Grain Terminal ====
A bulk grain terminal—annual capacity of 5 million tonnes per year—was opened in 1990. It can handle ships up to 129,000 tonnes, and has a storage capacity of 260,000 tonnes and a loading rate of 5000 tonnes. Capacity was expanded in 2016, when a new grain terminal capable of 1.3 million tonnes/year shipped its first export grain.

==== Car Imports ====
In 2007, imported car unloading operations were moved from Sydney Harbour to Port Kembla. The first two 55,000 tonne car carriers commenced unloading on 10 May 2007.

==== Casting Basin ====
As part of the construction facilities for the Sydney Harbour Tunnel (contract signed in June 1987) a casting basin—100m wide, 320m long, and overall 12.5m deep—was excavated in the western section of the Inner Harbour. The submerged sections of the tunnel—each weighing 30,000 tons—were built there, temporarily sealed, floated and towed to Sydney for installation. Afterwards, the casting basin was used to make huge concrete gravity-based structures for two off-shore oil platforms, from 1993 to 1996.
