= Sally Bowen =

Australian women's rights activist and peace activist (1918-1999)

Sally Bowen (née Sally Phipps); (9 January 1918 - 25 February 1999) was an Australian feminist, communist and community activist. She spent much of her life in the Wollongong area where she was an active unionist and Communist Party of Australia member.

She ran as a Communist Party candidate for the Electoral district of Bulli in 1953, 1962 and 1965. Additionally she was involved in many protests and strikes in the region, including anti-war protests during the Vietnam War and the Jobs for Women campaign in the 1980s.

== Early life ==
Bowen was born in Gunnedah, in New South Wales, and she was the daughter of Andrew and Margaret (née Porter) Phipps. When she was born her father worked as a share farmer and, later, travelled as an itinerant labourer. The family's lack of financial means caused Bowen to leave school at the age of thirteen, when she started working in the pastoral industry and was, for a period, a sheep drover. Despite leaving formal schooling at an early age Bowen's mother, in particular, encouraged her to continue learning and educating herself and ensured there were ample books for her to read. Through her love of reading Bowen also developed a passion for poetry which led to her first being published, in the Northern Daily Leader, at the age of nineteen.

In Bowen's teen years her father was no longer able to work due to his health and the family relocated to Narrabri where she assisted her mother in the operation of a boarding house and here she was responsible for cooking and cleaning for their 12 to 15 guests. The boarding house closed by 1941 and, relying on only the age pension, the family relocated again the Fairy Meadow, near Wollongong. By this time Bowen was twenty-three years old and, to help her family, she initially took a role as a cook at the nearby Corrimal Hotel.

Shortly after this, however, and due to the impacts of World War II, she took a role at a munitions factory which had been established in Port Kembla where she manufactured Owen guns. Despite a lack of men in the domestic workforce at this time Bowen was still one of the few women employed. Working at the factory strengthened Bowen's socialist leanings and, soon after she started there, she joined the Federated Ironworkers' Association of Australia, which was then communist-led, for which she became a shop steward. While in this role Bowen was a part of the union process in which women won 75% of the male rate at the factory, this was an increase of the 50% that had been previously available. In 1943 Bowen also joined the Communist Party of Australia (CPA) and, within the first few months of her membership, was an organiser of socials and fundraising events for the CPA as well as the Red Cross.

In 1944, when the Owen gun ceased production, Bowen changed work roles and began working at the Berlei factory where, as a female worker, she was paid significantly less which encouraged her to continue her union involvement, now with the Clothing Trade Union. In 1946, won the 'Communist Party Popular Girl' competition and, around this time, she also became the local area organiser for the CPA's Eureka Youth League.

Bowen left factory work in 1947 in order to care for her parents and, with limited income, took up dressmaking to make ends meet. She had attempted to remain in paid work by placing her father in a nursing home, however, she found the conditions 'appalling' and decided to care for him at home; she felt anger about the situation and the lack of government support with additional frustration regarding the role that she felt was forced on her as a woman.

Despite this Bowen continued her involvement in the CPA and, throughout the several weeks of the 1949 Australian coal strike, assisted mining families, through organising activities for the children of the miners as well as writing poetry and songs about the strike which were sung widely throughout. As a part of this support she also hid large sums of cash, from the unions bank accounts, in her home due to fears that their accounts would be frozen by the government; she would later say this gave her 'a lot of worry'.

In 1951 Bowen replaced Eric Aarons as the South Coast District Secretary for the CPA on Aarons suggestion; this was a paid position. In 1955 Bowen resigned her role as secretary but remained on the district committee until 1991 when the party was dissolved. During this time she ran for the CPA for the Electoral district of Bulli in 1953, 1962 and 1965. She campaigned on the nationalisation of monopolies, women's rights and the increasing of funding for public housing, schools and hospitals. In 1964 Bowen was also able to travel to the Soviet Union as the leader of the CPA delegation.

As a communist Bowen was also involved in campaigning for the 1967 Australian referendum relating to First Nations people and worked closely with Aboriginal groups in the South Coast region, especially the Dharawal people and, as a part of this, also became involved in the establishment of the Nowra and South Coast Aboriginal Advancement Leagues. Bowen was also a part of the Miners’ Women’s Auxiliary, the South Coast Association for International Co-operation and Disarmament and Save Our Sons.

Bowen also took part in the broader women's liberation movement and sought increased employment opportunities for women and, as part of this, was involved in Jobs for Women campaign at the Port Kembla steelworks as well as helping to establish the Wollongong Women’s Centre in 1980.

In 1987, in recognition of her work to improve healthcare in her region she was made the inaugural first chair of the Illawarra Aged Task Force and later, in 1990, was made a life member of the South Coast Labour Council.

In 1994 she published a book of her poetry, A Garland of Poetry, which included her poetry that looked in detail about social justice causes.

She died on 25 February 1999 at Thirroul.

== Personal life ==
In 1951, during the campaign against Australian Communist Party ban referendum, Bowen met, and on 12 March 1954, married David Bowen who was a miner and fellow member of the Communist Party of Australia. In 1955 Bowen experienced a miscarriage and later in the 1950s she gave birth to two children David and Margaret.

Their home was a focal point for many activists over the years and they welcomed many guests to their home. Her husband David died in 1984 after a long period of illness.

== Legacy ==
Talking about her life of activism Bowen stated:

The most significant thing I learned was that if you want to do something, you don’t go and do it alone. You get a group of like-minded people and you set about thinking through what you want, and how you’re going to get it. You plan before you start out. Learning to work as part of team was the most wonderful experience, and something that I’ve valued ever since

— Sally Bowen, as Quoted in: Comrade Sally Bowen, Working Class Hero by Mike Donaldson
