= Jobs for Women campaign =

1980s Australian women's rights campaign

The Jobs for Women campaign was a public campaign waged during the 1980s to win the right for women to work at the Port Kembla steelworks in Wollongong, Australia. The campaign won a historic court case, Australian Iron and Steel Pty Ltd v Banovic, under the New South Wales Anti-Discrimination Act 1977 and set a precedent for the employment of women in non-traditional areas of work and the interpretation of direct and indirect discrimination.

Robynne Murphy's 2020 documentary film, Women of Steel, tells the story of the campaign.

== Background ==
The Port Kembla steelworks was owned by Australian Iron & Steel (AI&S), a subsidiary of BHP, the largest company in Australia at the time - known as the Big Australian. AI&S employed around 20,000 people, but women were routinely told there were no jobs for them. Instead, the majority of the women who applied were placed on a wait list and were told they would be considered for hire if a position opened up. Over two thousand women's names were placed on the wait list, while men who applied for a position at AI&S would be hired to work soon after they applied. With Wollongong's high migrant population, it was common for migrant women to apply for these jobs. Men who were placed on the wait list were hired within weeks. Women waited for years, and even then a job placement was not guaranteed. BHP routinely practiced dividing jobs into 'men's' and 'women's' jobs. The limited 'women's' jobs that were available were those that the men viewed as repetitive such as sorting tin in the tin mill.

As a result, a group of women who applied for various job positions started the "Jobs for Women" campaign to challenge discriminatory hiring practices by AI&S. To garner more attention from the community, government, and media, the Jobs for Women campaigners petitioned for women, especially migrant women, to support their cause and get involved. One of the women involved in this movement was Sally Bowen, a communist and community activist, from the region.

In 1980, 34 women lodged complaints with the New South Wales (NSW) Anti-Discrimination Board under the Anti-Discrimination Act 1977. The company had relied upon one of the exemptions to the Act, compliance with so-called protective legislation, specifically the sex-specific weight limit of 16 kg contained in section 65 of the Factories, Shops and Industries Act (NSW).

As a result of investigations by the NSW Anti-Discrimination Board and hearings before the Equal Opportunity Tribunal, 300 women were hired by AI&S to work as ironworkers. When an economic recession hit two years later, most of the women were retrenched based on the rule of "last hired, first fired". The same women then lodged a complaint with the Equal Opportunity Board and argued that if they had been hired when they first applied for a job years before, they would not have lost their job in the latest round of retrenchments. In 1983, the Jobs for Women campaign would bring their discrimination case to court. In 1985, the courts ruled that AI&S had discriminated against women applicants and were ordered to pay a $1 million settlement in 1986. Despite AI&S's requirement to pay the settlement to the women who filed discrimination charges, they delayed the payments which caused the Jobs for Women Campaign to protest in order for BHP to get involved. In 1994, BHP mediated and awarded the $1 million payment to the women who accused AI&S of discrimination.

== Legacy ==
The Jobs for Women campaign and court case had garnered much attention from the community, government, and media. Not only did this allow for anti-discriminatory hiring adjustments at AI&S, but a rework of laws that had allowed for discriminatory policies such as section 65 of the NSW Factories, Shops, and Industries Act.

Former Sex Discrimination Commissioner Sue Walpole described the case as "the most important piece of discrimination litigation that has occurred in this country".

The campaign and several court cases took 14 years, making it the longest-running sex discrimination claim in Australia.

In 2020, Robynne Murphy released a documentary called Women of Steel about the campaign, which was selected for competition at the 2020 Sydney Film Festival, and the 2021 Melbourne Documentary Film Festival, where it won an award. It also won the Macquarie-PHA Applied History Award in 2020.

The State Library of NSW and Jessie Street National Women's Library holds archival papers relating to the campaign, the case, and the film.
