= Hill 60, Port Kembla =

Aboriginal heritage site in New South Wales

Hill 60: Illowra Battery
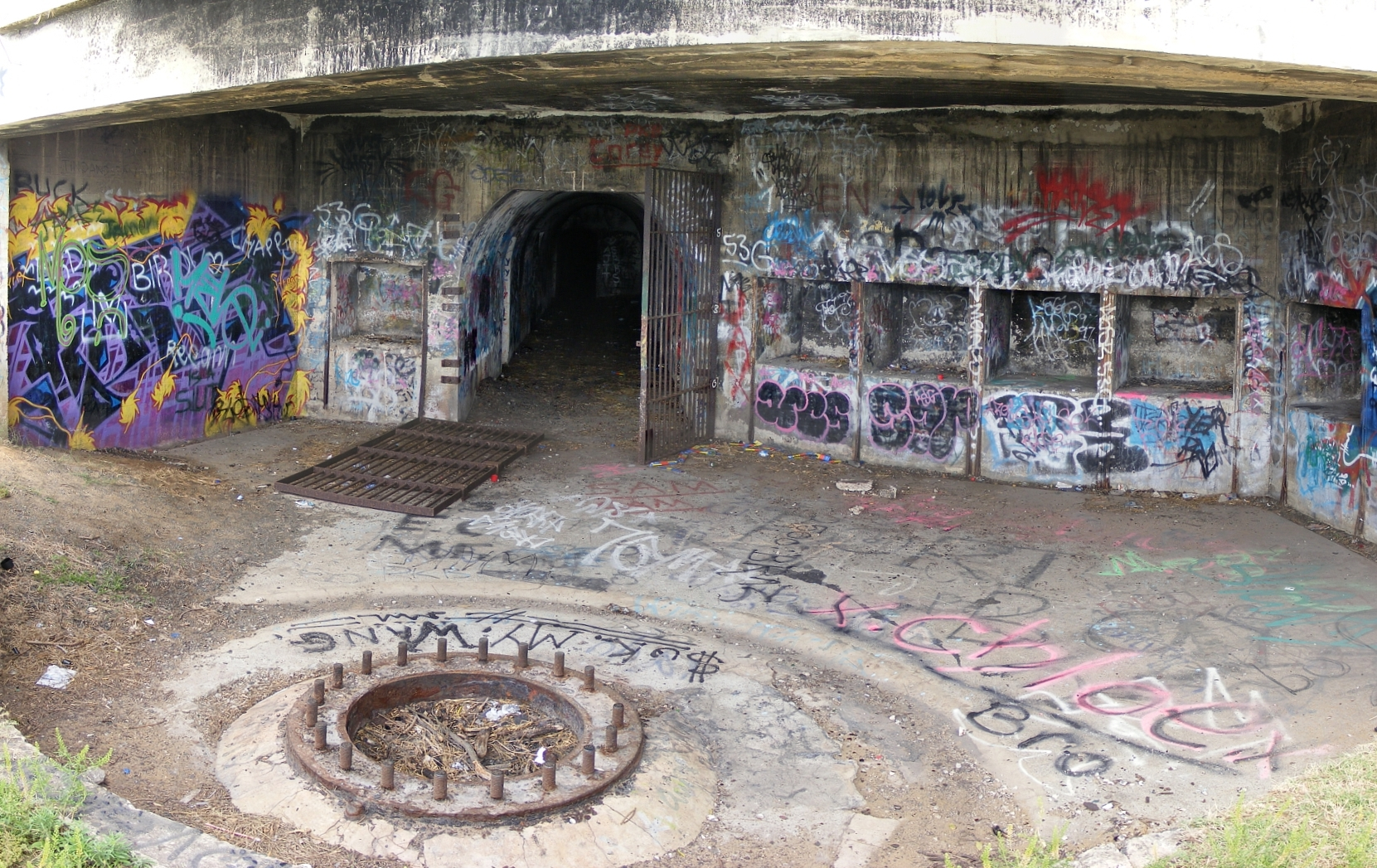
- Hill 60 Bunker, Port Kembla, 2008

- Location within New South Wales Location within Australia
- 34.4866°S 150.9169°E
- Location: Military Road, Port Kembla, City of Wollongong, New South Wales, Australia

Site notes
- Owner: Wollongong City Council

New South Wales Heritage Register
- Official name: Hill 60/ Illowra Battery; Red Point; Illowra Trig Station; The Hill
- Type: state heritage (landscape)
- Designated: 14 December 2001
- Reference no.: 1492
- Type: Historic site
- Category: Aboriginal

Hill 60 is a heritage-listed Aboriginal site at Military Road, Port Kembla, in the Illawarra region of New South Wales, Australia. It is also the location of the World War II installation the Illowra Battery. The property is owned by Wollongong City Council. It was added to the New South Wales State Heritage Register on 14 December 2001.

== Description ==
Hill 60 Park is dominated by the rocky headland of Boilers Point and the sheltered embayment of Fisherman's Beach. Hill 60 rises steeply above Fisherman's Beach to a peak of 71 m a.s.l. at which point is situated the Illowra Trig Station. The elevated areas of the park are largely cleared and grassed and contain a public recreational Lookout, car park, access road, walking track, a hang-gliding launch pad and a Coast Guard radar operations unit. There are a number of defence installations, including gun batteries, tunnels, engine houses, search and spotlight positions, communications cabling, defence personal housing and amenities, and local defence earthworks, a transformer site, security post and tunnel installations, on the upper elevations of the Hill and along its side slopes. The peak of Hill 60, in the vicinity of the Illowra Trig Station was subject to considerable landscaping including infilling with coal wash which effectively increased the ground level in that area by several feet. While many of the installations were decommissioned after the war and sold off by the Commonwealth, a number are still in place in the study area to this day.

An established walking track is cut into and traverses the upper elevations of the Hill below the Lookout between the Red Point sewerage treatment site access road and a viewing area on the north facing side of the Hill. The walking track is narrow but well formed with a series of post and rail handrails and wood and metal stake steps. Erosion control measures on the side slope of the Hill above and below the track has included re-vegetation and slope stabilisation. A stepped gravel path links the car park with this viewing area along the western slope of the Hill. An informal walking track traverses the west facing side slopes of the Hill between the lower viewing area and the Playing Fields of the Senior College eventually linking to the Boiler Point car park and walking track. There are a small number of wooden and metal stake retaining steps in the steeper upper portion of the track. The lower portions of the track are totally informal and numerous side tracks criss-cross the vegetated lower slopes. Some of these tracks lead directly to the Fisherman's Beach Access Road and some cross the slope above the playing fields.

The dunes above Fisherman's Beach which form the east facing side slope of Hill 60 are very steep and partially de-vegetated as a result of erosion accelerated by recreational use. Natural vegetation includes some established Banksia and coastal heath but the slopes are heavily infested with bitou bush and lantana. Access to the beach is over these slopes is possible only with difficulty. The sand dunes at the toe of slope at the west end of Hill 60 are support a variety of native and exotic vegetation. There are a number of blowouts in this area which contain extensive evidence of prehistoric Aboriginal occupation. The Aboriginal shell midden and artefact scatters have, in the past, been exposed by erosion and de-vegetation and covered over by aeolian sand. It is most likely they were continuous over these lower sand dunes to the end of Boilers Point but have been bisected by the construction of the Fisherman's Beach access road.

Aboriginal sites previously recorded within and adjacent to the study area comprise the following:

- A burial discovered eroding out of midden material at Port Kembla High School: An unregistered burial at the Australian Fertilisers Ltd site to the west of North Beach
- A midden containing a wide range of shell species and stone artefacts inclusive of cores and secondarily worked flakes located on the lower slopes of Hill 60 at Boilers Point
- A midden site on a small hill in the Red Point sewerage treatment site
- A midden with stone artefact scatters eroding out of sand dunes over large exposed areas at the northern end of North Beach.

=== Condition ===
As at 30 January 2013, Boilers Point has been extensively impacted upon by activities associated with the military, including the installation of an Electric Beach Searchlight, an engine room and WWII defensive trenches. Numerous 4WD roads and walking tracks criss-cross the Point. Use of these features has to some extent been limited by the installation of access blocks and a formed formal walking track. Aboriginal midden deposits that were exposed in these features are now being covered over by regenerating grass and heath or have been partially covered by the formal walking track. A watercourse which may have contained a natural spring on the north western side of Boilers Point is now largely re-shaped by the formation of a wetland area and "frog hollow". This landscaping has disturbed Aboriginal shell deposits adjacent to this feature. A small sandy beach between MM Beach and Boilers Point contains Aboriginal shell deposits at the interface of the beach and the toe of slope below the watercourse and "frog hollow". Other Aboriginal shell deposits are located at the interface of the upper elevations of the rock walls around Boilers Point and the soil deposits on the Point itself. Some of these have been exposed by the military installations on the Point and some by the creation and use of access tracks to these features.

MM Beach has been truncated along its western dunes by the formation of Gloucester Boulevard. The Boulevard is formed and guttered along most of its length. The formed portion to its intersection with Darcy Road also contains a pavement, bus lay-by, car park and cycle track. A short length at the northern end of the road is tarred but contains no kerbs or gutterings. A number of informal sidetracks and turning circles have been formed along the eastern side of the road over the sand dunes. There are a number of 4WD roads and numerous walking tracks between the boulevard and the beach at the northern end of the beach. The southern end of the beach, from the carpark to the end of the beach, is flanked by steep rocky slopes and rocky bluffs which topographically prohibits access to the beach.

There are, or were, a number of military installations located at the northern end of the beach, including a machine gun post, the main command building, a coarse aggregate concrete service trench and gun emplacements. There has been considerable ground disruption associated with these installations and access to them. The middle and southern portions of MM Beach contain a WWII semi-circular brick gun emplacement, stormwater drains, the remains of a possible early jetty and coarse aggregate and swimming baths on a rock platform. Extensive deposits Aboriginal shell midden are located in the dune formations of MM Beach between the rocky headland of the military land and middle portion of the beach. Here the sand dunes have either been massively disturbed by stormwater drain construction or are truncated by rising rocky bluffs and the construction of Gloucester Boulevard.

== Heritage listing ==
Hill 60 and its environs (MM Beach, Boilers Point, Fisherman's Beach and Hill 60 Park) contains a rare suite of Aboriginal sites which demonstrate the evolving pattern of Aboriginal cultural history and the Aboriginal land rights struggle. The quality, extent and diversity of the prehistoric archaeological remains at this place are rare on the NSW coast particularly in the local region. These include extensive shell midden deposits rich in stone artifacts and burials.

There is demonstrated cultural affiliation with the place by the Aboriginal community, through near continuous occupation of the place, a history of struggle to gain land tenure and ongoing association and use of the place. The historic Aboriginal occupation was characterised by a relatively isolated and self sufficient Aboriginal community that participated in the economic maintenance of the wider community by the provision of labour to local industry and produce (seafoods) at a commercial level. The people also maintained a culturally distinct Aboriginal lifestyle firmly based on the maintenance of family connections over the wider region and traditional economic practices.

Hill 60 was listed on the New South Wales State Heritage Register on 14 December 2001 having satisfied the following criteria.

The place is important in demonstrating the course, or pattern, of cultural or natural history in New South Wales.

The Wadi Wadi Aboriginal community of the south coast region, which includes people who were born and lived in the study area prior to forced removal, have consistently and persistently asserted their cultural affiliation to the place. A highly successful Aboriginal fishing enterprise was established at the Hill in the late 1800s supplying the local and Sydney market. The Hill was used as a fish-spotting lookout providing direction for the boats and netting operation below at Fisherman's Beach. This practice continued a traditional fishing method common along the south coast to the present.

The area of Hill 60 and MM Beach was an area on the southern coast of NSW that saw the prolonged struggle of the Aboriginal community to remain on traditional lands. The struggle was characterised by:

1. A relatively isolated and economically self-supporting Aboriginal community that maintained good neighbour relations and participated in the wider community. This was achieved by the provision of labour (in local steelworks and other industry) and produce (supply of prawns, fish and shellfish on a commercial basis), and maintained a culturally distinct Aboriginal lifestyle firmly based on the maintenance of family connections over the wider region and traditional economic practices.

2. A government bureaucracy at the local level and a white community which had experienced similarly severe deprivations as a result of economic depression in a predominantly working class community which was to some extent sympathetic and alternatively jealous of the Aboriginal communities which had remained relatively successful in "white terms".

3. An Aboriginal community that remained resolute in their attachment to important traditional lands in spite of efforts to transplant people to local Aboriginal Reserves.

Aboriginal sites within the area demonstrate the evolving pattern of Aboriginal cultural history and their land rights struggle.

The place is important in demonstrating aesthetic characteristics and/or a high degree of creative or technical achievement in New South Wales.

This place exhibits the qualities of an exceptional traditional Aboriginal-fishing environment that required organisation and co-operative endeavours to secure success.

The place has strong or special association with a particular community or cultural group in New South Wales for social, cultural or spiritual reasons.

This place is important to the Aboriginal community for social, cultural and spiritual reasons. The Wadi Wadi Aboriginal community of the south coast region, which includes people who were born and lived in the stud area prior to forced removal, have consistently and persistently asserted their cultural affiliation to the place. The place has evidence of prehistoric occupation in the form of significant and extensive shell middens and camp sites. The place was home to a group of Aboriginal families who continued traditional fishing practices, maintained their cultural attachment to the place by community, built and maintained their houses and maintained connections with family elsewhere on the coast. The site has particular importance in representing a focal point of the Aboriginal communities' ongoing efforts to secure recognition of tenure.

The place has potential to yield information that will contribute to an understanding of the cultural or natural history of New South Wales.

The place has potential to yield information that will contribute to an understanding of NSW's Aboriginal cultural history, occupation patterns, stone tool technology and burial practice.

The archaeological research potential and educational value of the Aboriginal occupation sites (shell middens and artefact deposits) is extremely high. The middens are extensive and retain stratified in situ remains of occupation of a diverse nature. The place has in the past been used as a burial site. The likelihood of further buried humans remains is high.

The place possesses uncommon, rare or endangered aspects of the cultural or natural history of New South Wales.

The place is a rare example of an Aboriginal community successfully maintaining traditional affiliation and a group presence at this place continuously throughout the modern era until forced removal in 1942. It is unusual in that this took place in a fast developing urban coastal setting. The richness and diversity of the prehistoric occupation remains is rare in the local and regional context.

The place is important in demonstrating the principal characteristics of a class of cultural or natural places/environments in New South Wales.

The place is important in demonstrating the principal characteristics of Aboriginal coastal occupation including dispossession and the struggle for land rights.
