= Five Islands Nature Reserve =

Protected area in New South Wales, Australia

Five Islands
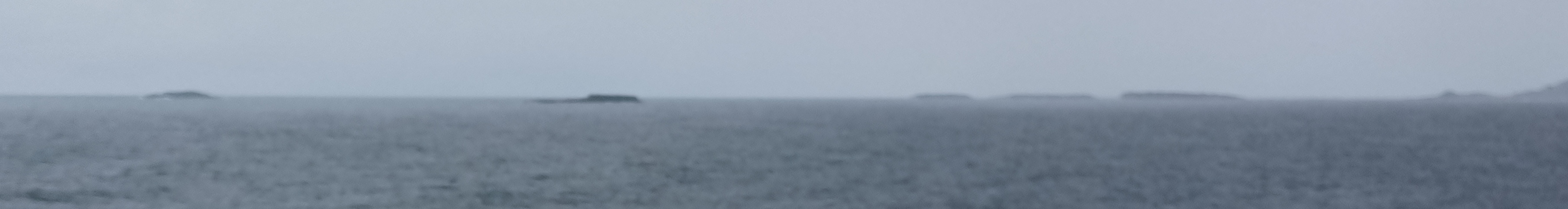
- Seen from Wollongong
- Interactive map of Five Islands

Geography
- Location: Tasman Sea
- Total islands: 5
- Major islands: Big ("Rabbit" or "Perkins") Island; Martin Islet
- Highest elevation: 16 m (52 ft)
- Highest point: Big Island

Administration
- Australia
- State: New South Wales

Five Islands Nature Reserve
- IUCN category IV (habitat/species management area)
- Location within New South Wales
- Location: New South Wales
- Nearest city: Port Kembla
- Coordinates: 34°29′S 150°56′E
- Area: 0.26 km^{2} (0.10 sq mi)
- Established: 10 June 1960
- Governing body: NSW National Parks & Wildlife Service
- Website: Official website

The Five Islands Nature Reserve is a protected nature reserve located in the Tasman Sea, off the Illawarra east coast of the state of New South Wales, Australia. The 26-hectare (64-acre) reserve comprises five continental islands that are situated between 0.5 and 3.5 kilometres (0.31 and 2.17 mi) east of Port Kembla. The Five Islands are Flinders Islet (Toothbrush Island), Bass Islet, Martin Islet, Big Island (also called Rabbit or Perkins Island) and Rocky Islet.

== History ==
The reserve was originally dedicated as a fauna reserve in 1960; it is considered significant for its biological and Aboriginal heritage values and is managed by the NSW National Parks & Wildlife Service.

At the height of the last ice-age some 18,000 years ago, with a lower sea-level, the islands were part of the mainland. When Europeans first visited the area around and immediately south of Sydney in the late 18th century, the mainland coast opposite the Five Islands was occupied by the Tharawal people.

Cattle and rabbits were introduced to the islands before 1861. In 1867 a house was built on Big Island by the Perkins family, who lived there until 1872, grazing cattle and catching sharks. In the early 20th century the sea floor to the west of Big Island was mined for shells.

== Aboriginal Dreamtime: The Story of the Five Islands ==
In Dreamtime legend, the West Wind, lived on top of Merrigong (the Illawarra Range) With the West Wind were his six little daughters Mimosa, Wilga, Lilli Pilli, Wattle, Clematis and Geera.

Sometimes the children's cousins, who lived in a seaside camp just north of Red Point, came up the mountain for a visit. The little children brought gifts of fish, pretty sea-shells, fruit and flowers, but Mimosa, an unpleasant child, was sulky and disagreeable to the visitors. When her sisters played and laughed with their cousins, Mimosa scratched and fought. Oola-boolawoo was so annoyed at his daughter's rude behaviour he snatched off the piece of the mountain upon which she sat, and threw it out to the sea.

How strange to see a large piece of rock flying through the air with the little black girl, Mimosa, clinging to it! Plop! went the great rock into the sea, giving Mimosa a shower bath, which cooled her naughty temper. "Whoosh, gurgle, goggle", she cried, coughing and choking. She looked about and was startled to see she was some distance from the land. In fact, she was on an island, to which neither her sisters nor her friends could swim, for fear of sharks. Poor Mimosa! Too late she regretted her naughtiness. Day after day she sat on the island, until she turned into a mermaid, slid into the sea and swam about.

Mimosa's fate should have been a lesson to her sisters, but, bye and bye, they grew lazy, careless and disobedient. One evening Oola-boola-woo, the West Wind, came home, at sunset, to find Wilga lying on a warm rock, playing with a pet lizard. She had not washed her face or combed her hair, nor had she tidied the house. Oola-boola-woo felt that his patience was at an end. He had had a hard day blowing up dust storms in the west and helped to fan a great bushfire, near Appin, so he was tired.

Taking a big breath, he blew Wilga and her rock out to sea. How surprised the people in the camp were next morning, to see two islands in the sea, not far from the coast. It wasn't long until Lilli Pilli, Wattle and Clematis were blown out to sea, on pieces of rock so that there were five islands, with five little mermaids sunning themselves. So Geera was the only child left in Oola-boola-woo's home on the mountain top. How lonely she was! Her father was often away, so there was no one to talk to. There was no one to play with, for the children in the camp had long grown tired of climbing the mountain side to visit the unruly family, on the top. Geera sat hunched, with her arms around her ankles, gazing down at the smoke of the blacks’ camp, or staring out at the Five Islands. Year after year she sat, so still and quiet she turned to stone. Dust and dead leaves fell upon her, grass and wild flowers grew over her, and so she became part of the mountain range. She is now known as Mount Keira.

== Flora and fauna ==
An account of a visit to the islands in 1914 refers to the island supporting "hundreds" of little penguins successfully breeding in burrows along with shearwaters and gulls. It also briefly mentions several species of marine life, including the Waratah anemone and either the Leafy or common sea dragon (though both are referred to by description, not by common name). Five species of birds were listed as breeding there in a presentation by J. A. Keast of the Australian Museum in 1952: little penguins, the white-faced storm petrel, wedge-tailed shearwater (aka muttonbird), crested tern and silver gull. At this time, Australia's only mainland breeding colony of muttonbirds was located nearby at Red Point, but was threatened by human disturbance.

The vegetation communities of the Five Islands, and especially Big Island have been degraded because of previous human usage and the introduction of exotic species of animals and plants. A major problem is the presence of Kikuyu grass on Big Island, which hinders the recovery of native vegetation and the burrowing activities of petrels.

Today, the reserve remains important for seabirds, on which ongoing research is carried out by the Southern Oceans Seabird Study Association. Species recorded as breeding on one or more islands of the reserve include the sooty oystercatcher, little penguin, wedge-tailed shearwater, short-tailed shearwater, crested tern, white-faced storm-petrel, silver gull, kelp gull and Australian pelican. Reptiles present in the reserve include the eastern water skink, common garden skink, weasel skink and three-toed skink. Marine mammals recorded as occasionally hauling-out on the intertidal fringes of the islands include the Australian fur seal, the New Zealand fur seal and the leopard seal.

== Geography ==
The islands are made of rocks of about 250 million years old which are volcanic in nature with sedimentary rocks overlying parts.

The islands were a part of the mainland, with the whole shelf area probably dune covered, up until about the end of the last Ice Age. As the sea level rose over the last 18,000 years the islands became separated from the mainland with sand and soil eroded away. At the highest sea levels of about 5,000 years ago portions of the islands would have been sea-swept. Soil cover is shallow and while deepest on Big Island, grazing in the late 19th century has accelerated the likely irreversible natural erosion processes.

Name of Island	Area (hectares)	Distance from Mainland	Highest elevation
Big Island	17.7	450m	16m
Flinder's Islet	2.73	2550m	10m
Bass Islet	2.63	3050m	10m
Martin Islet	2.33	1350m	13m
Rocky Islet	0.5	280m	1m

== See also ==
- Islands of New South Wales
- Protected areas of New South Wales
