= Martin Islet (New South Wales) =

Island in New South Wales, Australia

Martin Islet (34°29′S 150°56′E) is a small island lying just off Red Point, Port Kembla in New South Wales, Australia.

== William Martin ==
The Five Islands, of which Martin Islet is one, were named Martins Isles by Matthew Flinders and George Bass after Bass's navy servant William Martin. Martin was part of their three-man crew when they anchored by the island on 25 March 1796 in the Tom Thumb, having been swept a long way off-course on their way to Port Hacking.

Little is known of Martin's life. Born December 31, 1780 in Dartford, he was baptised on March 4, 1781. He was the son of John and Ann Martin. In 1794, he was employed by the navy as a loblolly boy (personal servant) to Bass who was the surgeon on board HMS Reliance for her voyage to Australia. Martin was still with Bass in 1799 at age 18 when Bass left the navy, but at that point record of him ends.

William Martin as the [medical] servant to George Bass RN surgeon, on 15.02.1795 sailed on HMS Reliance bound for Port Jackson, New South Wales, arriving on 08.09.1795. On the 29.05.1799, George Bass sailed on the Nautilus to Macao, China and then from Bombay, India sailed on the East India Company Woodford to England arriving on 04.08.1800. It is not known if William Martin returned to England with George Bass.
