= Illowra Battery =

Former military installation in Australia

Coordinates: 34°29′29.43″S 150°54′58.30″E

Illowra Battery is a former Australian Army coastal-artillery battery located at Hill 60, Port Kembla, New South Wales in Australia, built and in service during World War II. It was also otherwise known as Hill 60 Battery.

== History ==
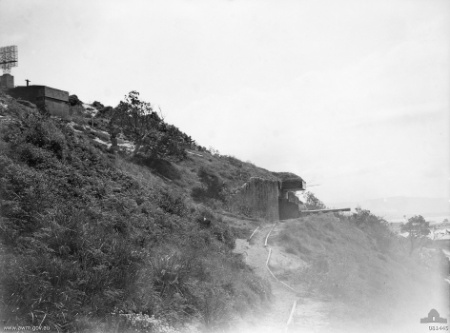
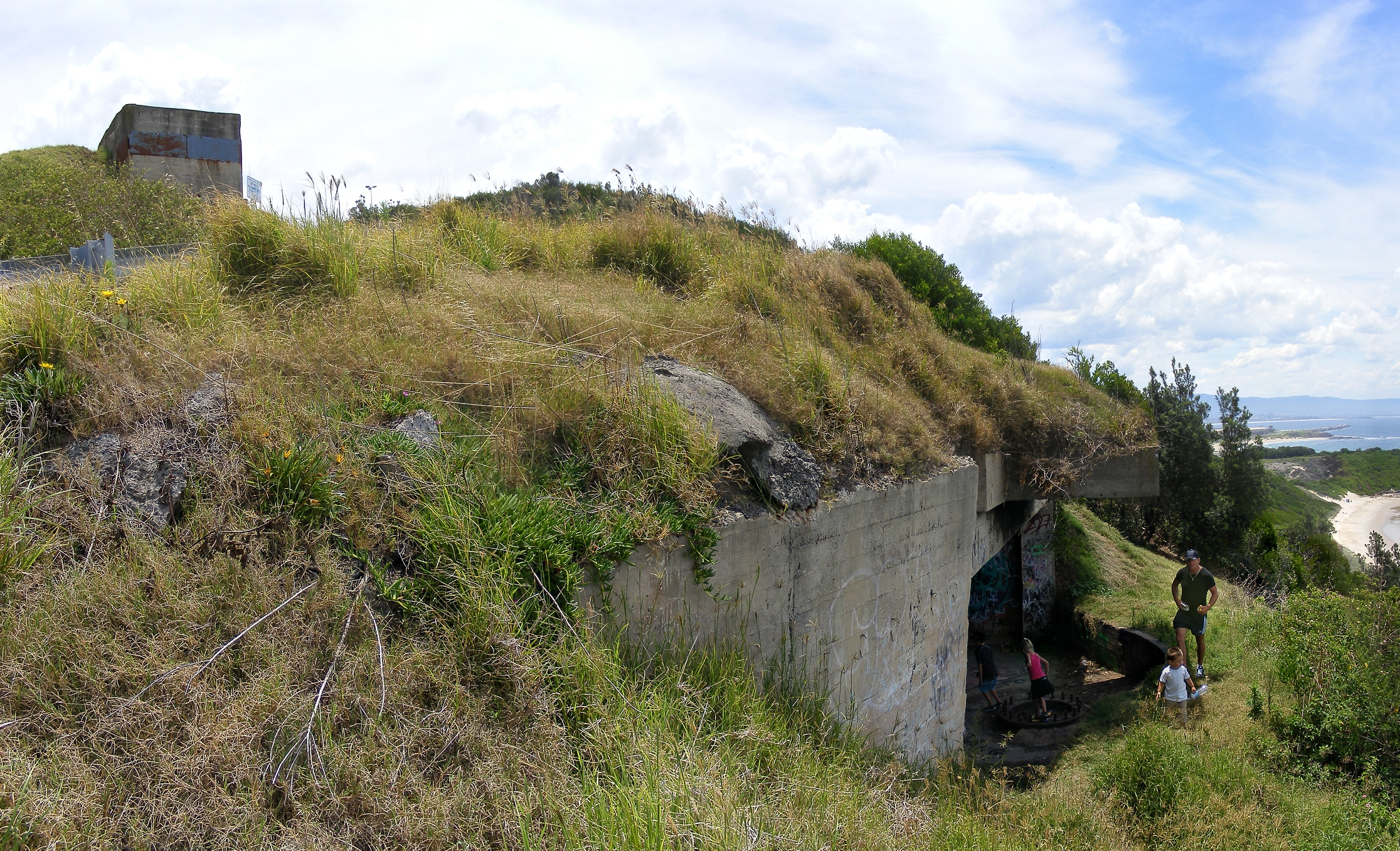
The section-post and the No. 2 BL 6-inch Mk. XI gun-position, shown in October of 1944 (on left) and how the No. 2 gun-position appears today (on right).
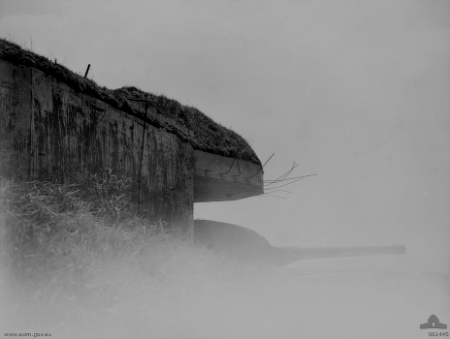
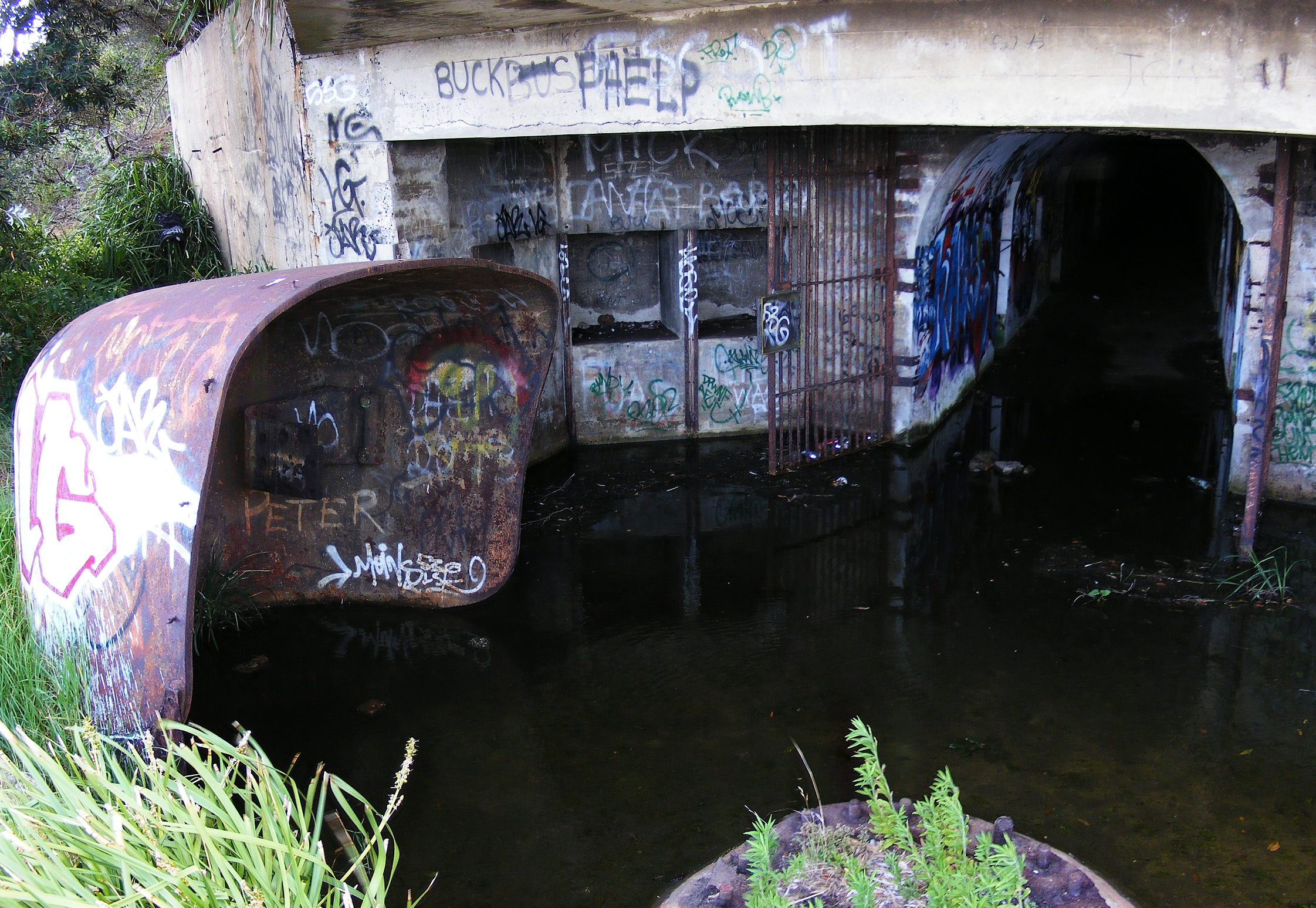
The No. 1 gun, pictured in October of 1944 (on left), and as it looks today with its former gun-shield still present (on right).

Two large naval-gun emplacements were constructed, both housing British BL 6-inch Mk. XI guns and complete with their protective gun-shields formerly held in storage from the decommissioned World War I-era Australian Navy cruisers HMAS Brisbane, Sydney and HMAS Melbourne. Two large tunnels were built to support the gun-battery and are steep in its descent underground and is fitted with a small-gauge tram/trolleyway used for hauling the guns' shells to their breeches located at the two coastal-gun emplacements above.

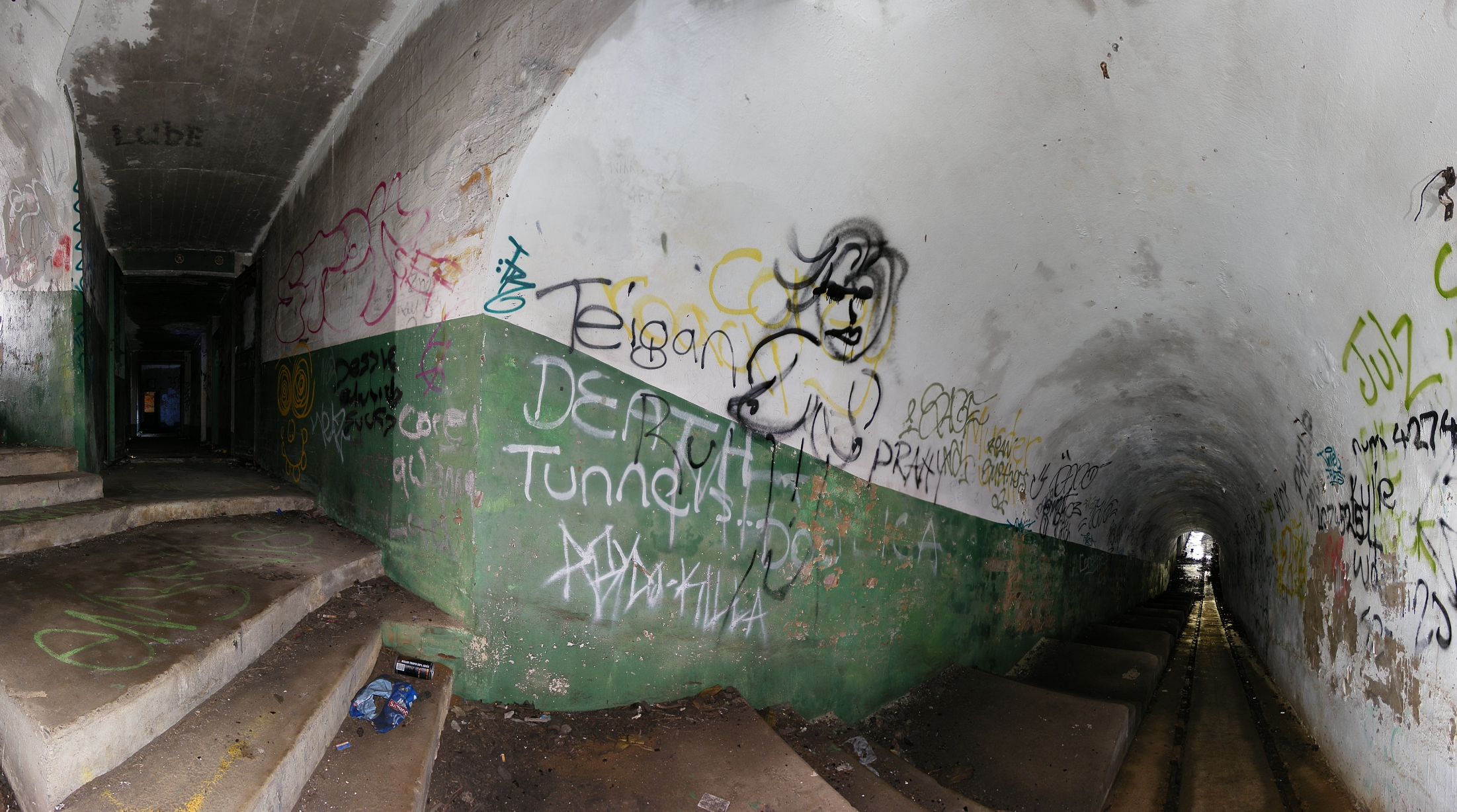
One of two tunnels at the gun-battery site; this time, looking downwards with another corridor towards the left leading into the main bunker complex, now a mushroom farm.

Aside from the two tunnels, a concrete bunker was also built and is connected to the tunnel system.

Illowra Battery was abandoned shortly after the end of World War II in 1945. A mushroom farm was established in its main bunker complex due to the cool temperature and adequate humidity within for the growing of such edible fungi. Today, the site remains popular with local visitors as well as urban explorers, who have added graffiti to the old battery's walls and remnants.
