= Port Kembla, New South Wales =

Port Kembla
- Suburb
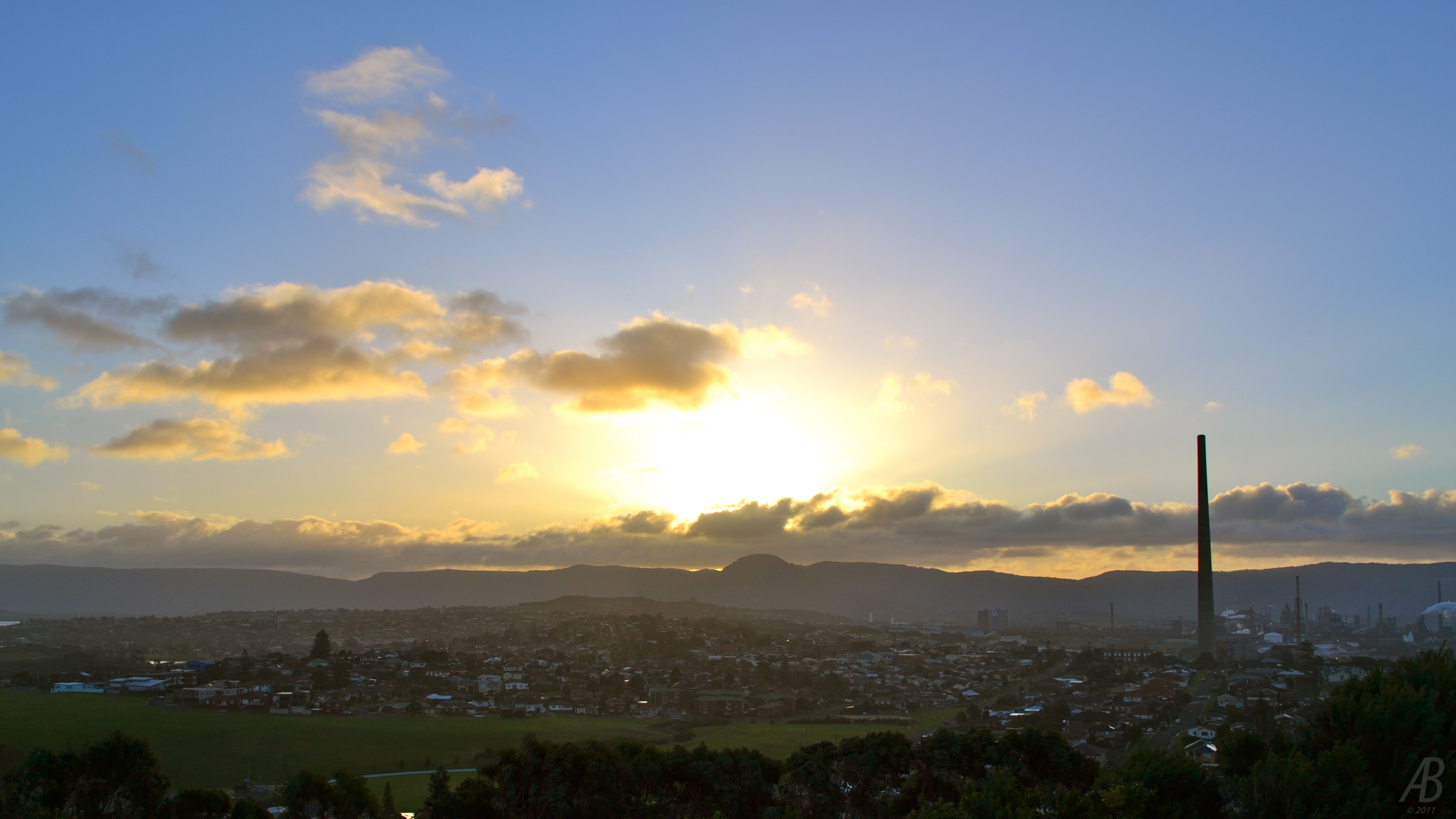
- View of Port Kembla from Hill 60 Park looking North West at sunset

- Coordinates: 34°28′32″S 150°54′01″E
- Country: Australia
- State: New South Wales
- City: Wollongong
- LGA: City of Wollongong
- Location: 94 km (58 mi) S of Sydney; 10 km (6.2 mi) S of Wollongong; 26 km (16 mi) N of Kiama

Government
  - State electorate: Wollongong
  - Federal division: Cunningham
- Elevation: 19 m (62 ft)

Population
  - Total: 5,088 (2021 census)
- Time zone: UTC+10 (AEST)
  - Summer (DST): UTC+11 (AEDT)
- Postcode: 2505
Suburbs around Port Kembla
Cringila	Coniston	Tasman Sea
Warrawong	Port Kembla	Five Islands Nature Reserve
Kemblawarra	Primbee	Tasman Sea

Port Kembla is a suburb of Wollongong 10 km south of the CBD and part of the Illawarra region of New South Wales. The suburb comprises a seaport, industrial complex (one of the largest in Australia), a small harbour foreshore nature reserve, and a small commercial sector. It is situated on the tip of Red Point: its first European sighting was by Captain James Cook in 1770. The name "Kembla" is an Aboriginal word meaning "plenty [of] wild fowl".

== History ==
Before Port Kembla was an industrial suburb of Wollongong, it was a town with a remarkably self-sufficient society, a growing commercial centre, and a vibrant civic life. Town subdivision began in 1908, and by 1921 there were 1622 residents. Economic expansion propelled further population growth. Port Kembla derives its name from its proximity to Mount Kembla.

=== Industrial change ===
A copper smelter and refinery, the Electrolytic Refinery and Smelting Company of Australia, began production in 1908, followed by the opening of Metal Manufactures in 1917 and finally the arrival of the Hoskins Iron & Steel Works in 1927. The works became Australian Iron & Steel the following year.

By 1947 the town's population had increased to 4,960 with smaller satellite suburbs such as Cringila and Lake Heights, mushrooming on its fringes. That year, 1947, marked the climax of a local campaign for municipal autonomy which was ultimately thwarted by the creation of a Greater City of Wollongong. In the post-Second World War period there was an inexorable decline of a 'Port Kembla' society as local town boundaries were slowly but surely absorbed into a more Wollongong-focused or regional identity.

=== Cultural diversity ===
Despite the decline from the heyday of the 1920s, the town experienced major social and demographic change in the 1950s and 1960s. Waves of migrants, mostly from the United Kingdom, Italy, Macedonia and Germany, moved to the town. During this period, Port Kembla was on the cusp of changes affecting Australian society generally as new ethnic and cultural influences found a place in local society. With its long migration history accommodating waves of migrant workers and their families, Port Kembla is still one of the most culturally diverse suburbs in New South Wales.

=== Hill 60 ===
Port Kembla's highest point, Hill 60, overlooks the Five Islands and Red Point. Hill 60, originally the site of an Aboriginal settlement, was used by the army during World War II to make a coastal gun emplacement known as Illowra Battery. In September 1942, Aboriginal inhabitants were forcibly evicted from the area. It has remained in public ownership and is now a public lookout reserve, despite a vigorous campaign to return some of the land to its Aboriginal owners. Although not technically open to tourists, the tunnels are open, and can be explored by foot. The entrance to the tunnels is located almost under the coastguard tower on Hill 60, and can be seen down the left when standing at the information board, facing southeast.

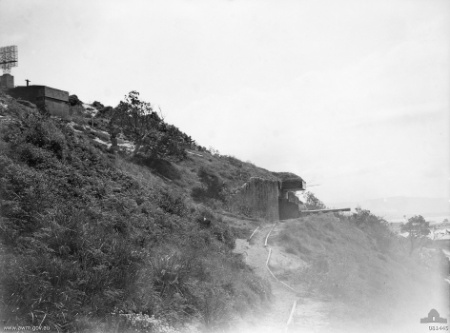
Dated: 1944 No. 2 gun Illowra Battery, Showing its original BL 6 inch Mk XI gun

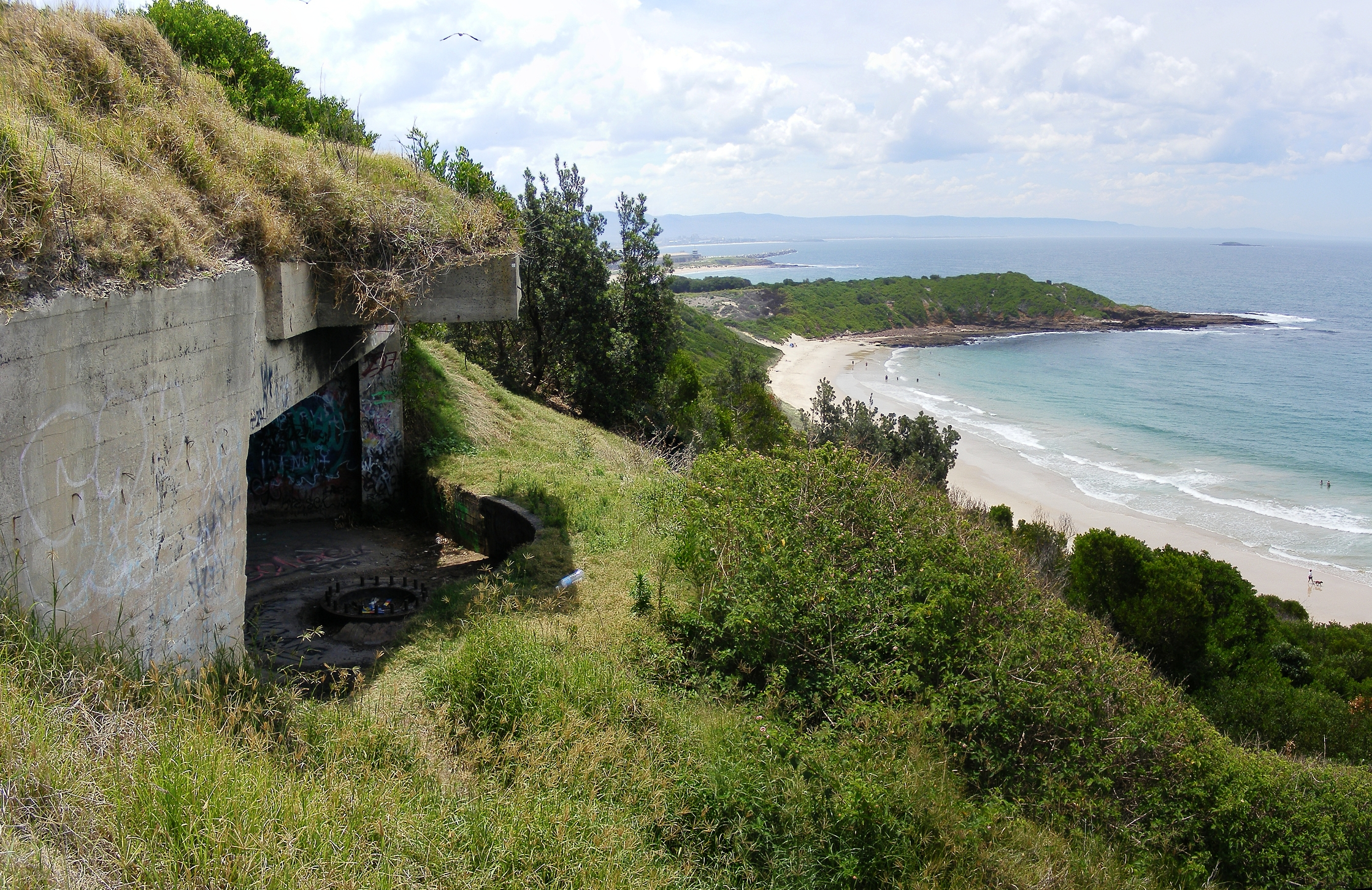
Gun position No. 2 at Illowra Battery, which formed part of the Kembla Fortress defences in World War II

=== HMAS Adele loss ===
On 7 May 1943, Australian steamer Adele struck the breakwater at Port Kembla and was subsequently declared a total loss. The wreck of Adele is protected under the New South Wales Heritage Act, 1977.

=== Union Protests ===
Port Kembla was the site of the Dalfram Dispute in 1938, where unionised dockworkers refused to load pig iron onto a ship heading for Japan after the Nanking Massacre. In 1974, a green ban was placed by the Builders Labourers Federation against high rise development and for the reclamation of the beach to be made a parkland.

The Jobs for Women campaign won the right for women to work at the Port Kembla steelworks. The campaign won a historic court case under the Anti-Discrimination Act and set a precedent for the employment of women in non-traditional areas of work and the interpretation of direct and indirect discrimination.

== Heritage listings ==
Port Kembla has a number of heritage-listed sites, including:

- Military Road: Hill 60

== Population ==
According to the 2021 census of Population, there were 5,088 people in Port Kembla.

- Aboriginal and Torres Strait Islander people made up 4.5% of the population.
- 70.6% of people were born in Australia. The next most common countries of birth were Macedonia 8.1%, Italy 2.4% and England 2.0%.
- 71.1% of people spoke only English at home. Other languages spoken at home included Macedonian 12.0% and Italian 3.0%.
- The most common responses for religion were No Religion 33.5%, Catholic 23.7%, Eastern Orthodox 14.1% and Anglican 8.3%.

== Climate ==
Port Kembla has a warm oceanic climate (Cfb) with humid summers and mild, crisp winters. The suburb enjoys abundant sunshine, getting 111.4 clear days, annually.

Climate data for Port Kembla (1957–1976)
Month	Jan	Feb	Mar	Apr	May	Jun	Jul	Aug	Sep	Oct	Nov	Dec	Year
Record high °C (°F)	41.9 (107.4)	36.1 (97.0)	39.4 (102.9)	32.5 (90.5)	29.4 (84.9)	25.6 (78.1)	25.8 (78.4)	28.3 (82.9)	35.0 (95.0)	35.0 (95.0)	39.2 (102.6)	39.8 (103.6)	41.9 (107.4)
Mean daily maximum °C (°F)	24.1 (75.4)	24.4 (75.9)	24.1 (75.4)	22.4 (72.3)	19.4 (66.9)	17.5 (63.5)	16.7 (62.1)	17.3 (63.1)	19.2 (66.6)	20.7 (69.3)	22.4 (72.3)	23.4 (74.1)	21.0 (69.8)
Mean daily minimum °C (°F)	18.4 (65.1)	18.7 (65.7)	18.0 (64.4)	15.7 (60.3)	12.7 (54.9)	10.9 (51.6)	9.8 (49.6)	10.3 (50.5)	11.8 (53.2)	13.7 (56.7)	15.3 (59.5)	17.1 (62.8)	14.4 (57.9)
Record low °C (°F)	13.3 (55.9)	13.0 (55.4)	10.6 (51.1)	10.0 (50.0)	5.6 (42.1)	5.3 (41.5)	1.1 (34.0)	2.2 (36.0)	2.2 (36.0)	7.2 (45.0)	9.2 (48.6)	10.0 (50.0)	1.1 (34.0)
Average precipitation mm (inches)	116.1 (4.57)	157.5 (6.20)	183.7 (7.23)	92.9 (3.66)	89.0 (3.50)	140.3 (5.52)	62.6 (2.46)	87.7 (3.45)	55.0 (2.17)	108.0 (4.25)	94.3 (3.71)	90.4 (3.56)	1,260.6 (49.63)
Average precipitation days	11.6	12.5	13.4	9.1	8.0	9.7	7.4	9.5	8.2	11.2	11.1	11.0	122.7
Average relative humidity (%)	75	76	74	68	62	61	57	57	61	67	67	72	67

== Industry and Infrastructure ==
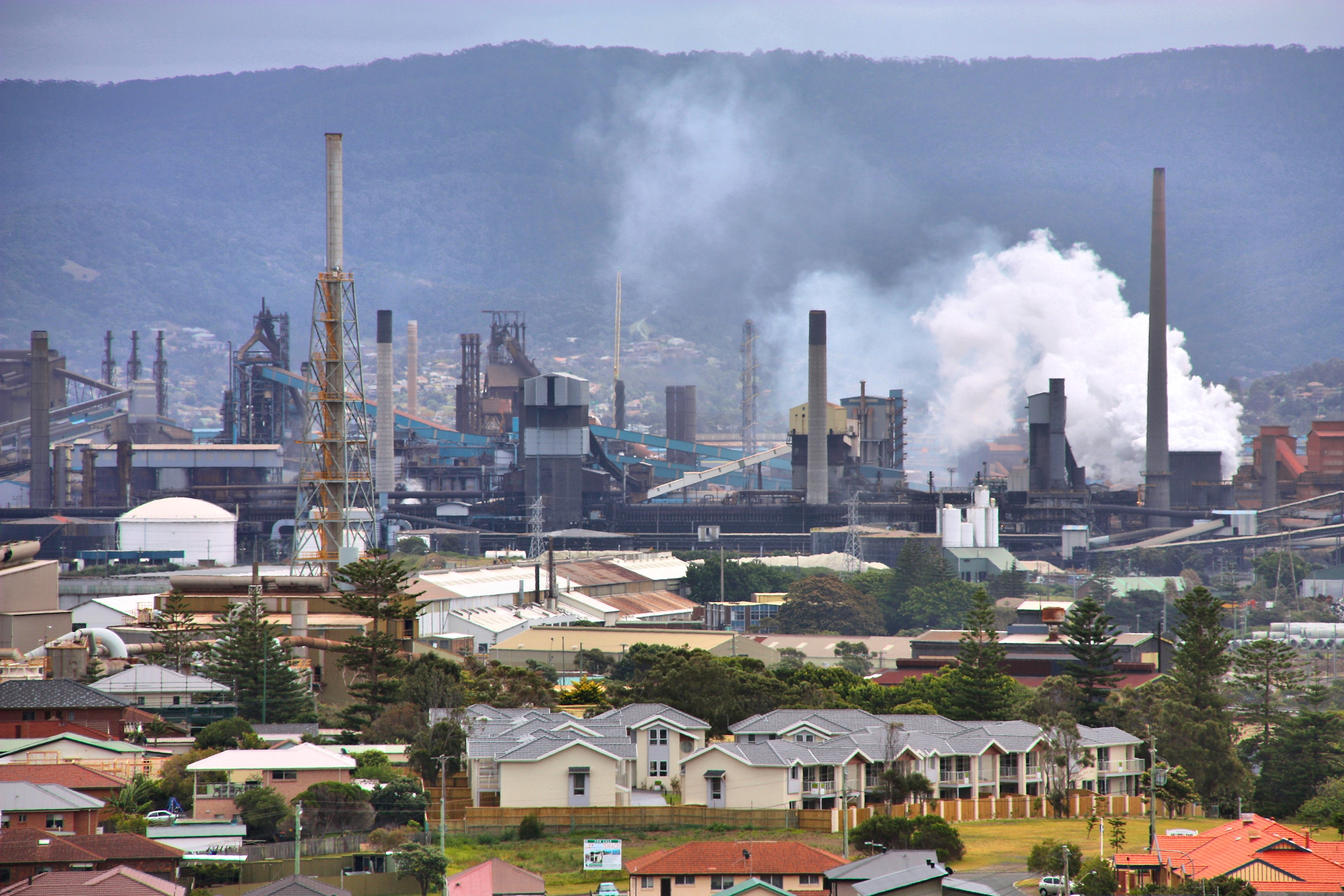
BlueScope steelworks

Port Kembla is known for the BlueScope steelworks operations on Springhill Road and throughout North Port Kembla. Other notable industrial operations in the suburb are: Port Kembla Coal Terminal, Port Kembla Copper, Incitec, Adstream Services, Port Kembla Gateway and GrainCorp.

=== Rail ===
Port Kembla has a railway station on the Port Kembla branch of the Illawarra railway line. It is the terminus of the branch line, and serves the residential area of the suburb of the same name. The station has one side platform, used for terminating trains. It is served by approximately one train per hour, usually a local service to Thirroul and Waterfall, but extra direct trains to and from Sydney are provided in the peak hours.

Pacific National operates daily coal trains to the Inner Harbour section of the port, and into the blast furnace section of the steelworks. Downer Rail has a workshop opposite the station that services diesel powered locomotives for Pacific National.

=== Port ===
Port Kembla harbour is a major export location for coal mined in the southern and western regions of New South Wales. As part of the state governments plan to divert ships containing automobiles, the port has received significant upgrades and infrastructure including a new Maritime Office and many jobs have been created as the need for port logistics grows. Patrick Corporation holds a contract for integrated port services in the harbour and transports goods by road or rail through its parent company Pacific National.

The port has a range of berths for loading coal, grain, shipping containers and other goods. As of 2020, a gas export terminal is also under development.

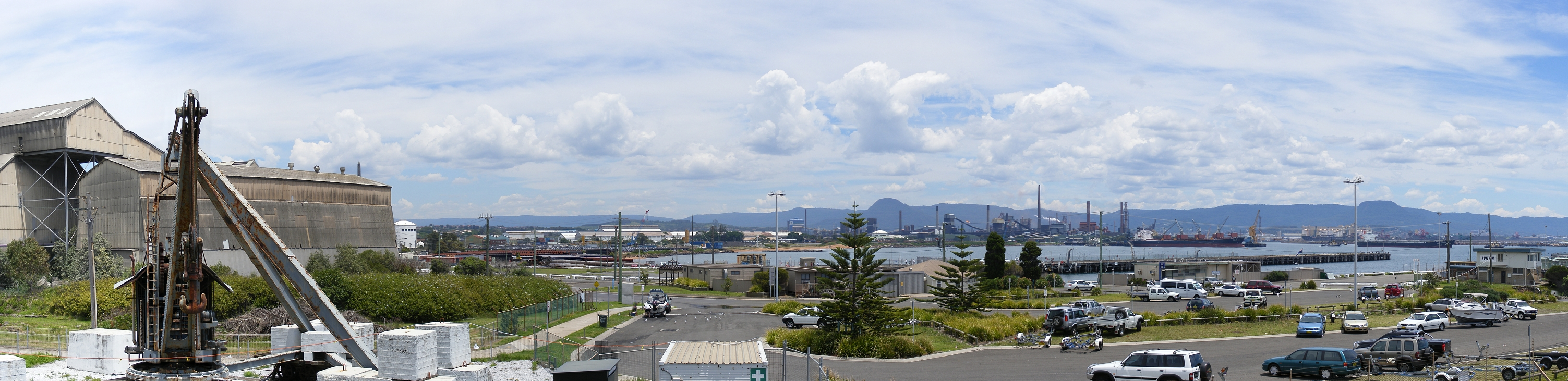
Port Kembla Harbour, taken from Breakwater Battery

Port Kembla was identified by the Australian Defence Department in 2023 as the most likely location to homeport the future Australian nuclear-powered submarines, probably active no earlier than the 2030s.

== Sports and leisure ==
=== Sporting teams ===
Port Kembla has both junior and senior teams in local popular sporting leagues such as:

- Port Kembla Rugby League in the Illawarra Division Rugby league

Home grounds are Noel Mulligan Oval

- Port Kembla Cricket Club in the Cricket Illawarra Competition

Home grounds are King George V Park

- Port Kembla Soccer Club in the Illawarra Football Association

Home grounds are Darcy Wentworth Park

- Port Kembla AFL Club plays in South Coast AFL and AFL Illawarra

Home grounds are Kully Bay Park.

Port Kembla Rugby league, Port Kembla Soccer Club and Port Kembla AFL home grounds are not located in Port Kembla, they all play in parks across Warrawong.

=== Parks and beaches ===
Port Kembla has a number of parks, nature reserves, beaches and a Saltwater Olympic pool:

- King George V Park

A foreshore park located in walking distance from Port Kembla Beach. Used in summer for Port Kembla Cricket Club home games.

- Hill 60 Park

A take-off area for hang gliders and paragliders, Hill 60 Park has BBQ facilities as well as picnic shelters, seats, and tables positioned to view the surrounding area.

- Port Kembla Beach (Or Perkins Beach)

An award-winning beach, seasonally patrolled from September to April and home to the Port Kembla Surf Life Saving Club. It's beach code is nsw379A and it has a Surf Life Saving Australia general hazard rating of 7/10

- Fishermans Beach

A small sheltered beach at the bottom of Hill 60's eastern side facing the Five Islands Nature Reserve.

- North Port Kembla Beach

Also known by locals as MM Beach for its close proximity to the Metal Manufacturers site on Gloucester Boulevard. Remnants of a tidal rock pool are still standing near the southern end of the beach below the headland.

Three people died after being washed into rough surf at the popular rock fishing spot on Friday 22 January 2021.

== Public transport ==
=== Train ===
Port Kembla has two railway stations on the Port Kembla branch of the NSW TrainLink South Coast Line.

Port Kembla railway station is the terminus of the branch line, and serves the residential area of Port Kembla. Port Kembla North serves the industrial area of the suburb. The station is the nearest to the BHP site in the area.

Both stations have a one sided platform, with the platform at Port Kembla used for terminating trains. The stations are served by approximately one train per hour, usually a local service to Thirroul, but extra direct trains to and from Sydney are provided in the peak hours.

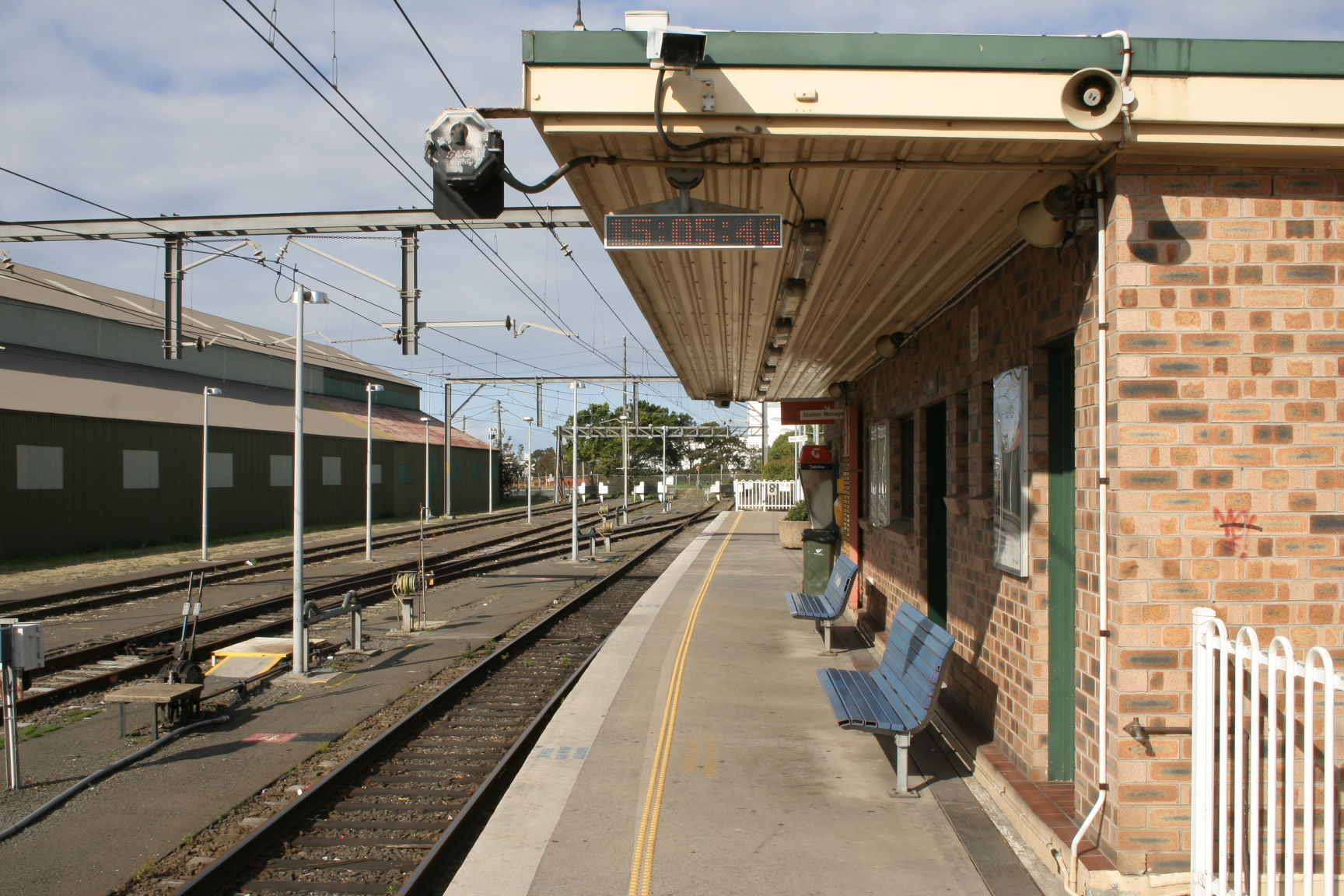
Port Kembla station

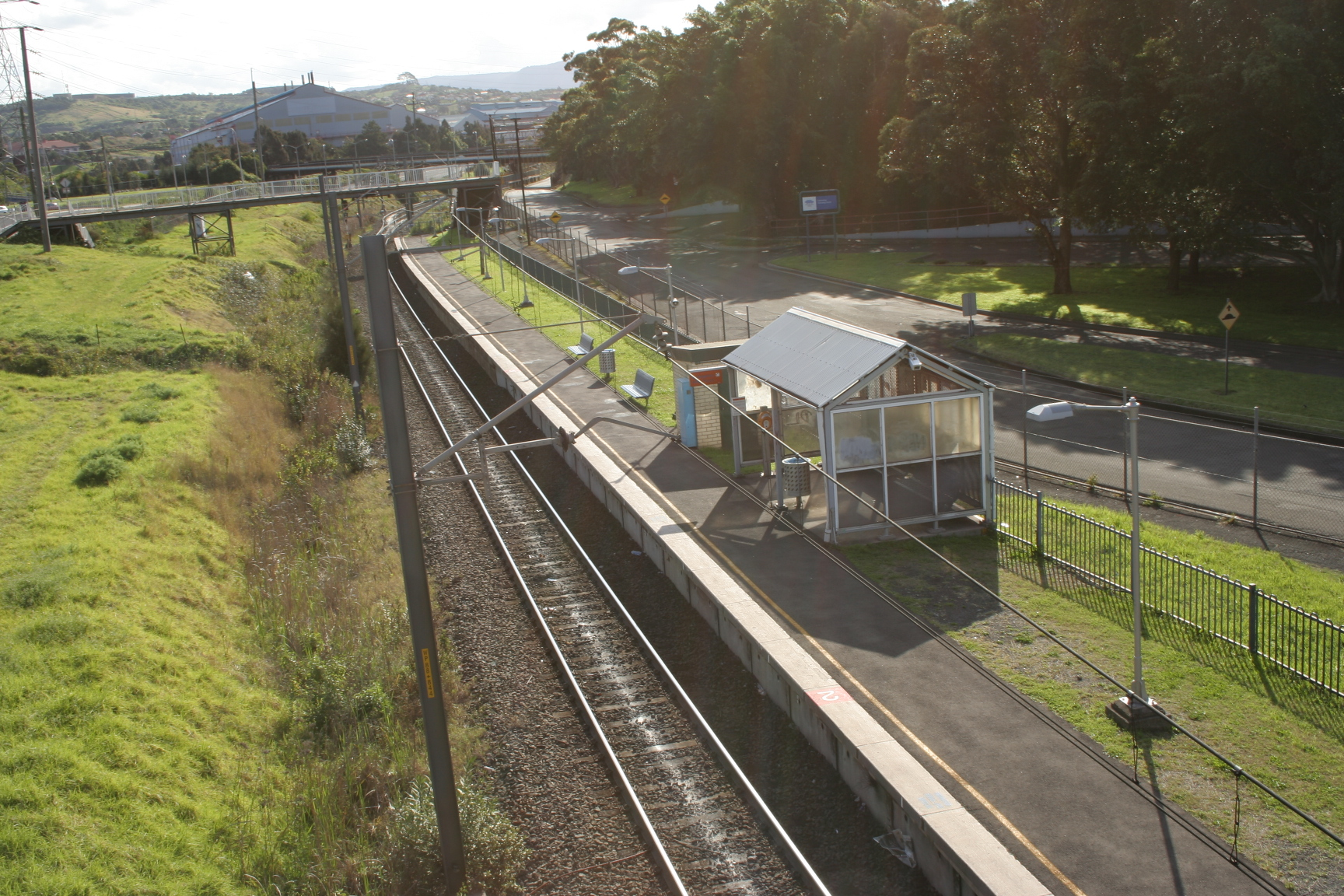
Port Kembla North station

=== Bus ===
Premier Illawarra runs three routes to and from Port Kembla railway station:

- 34 – to Wollongong via Berkeley
- 43 – to Dapto
- 65 – to North Beach

== Health and environmental issues ==
=== Port Kembla chimney stack ===
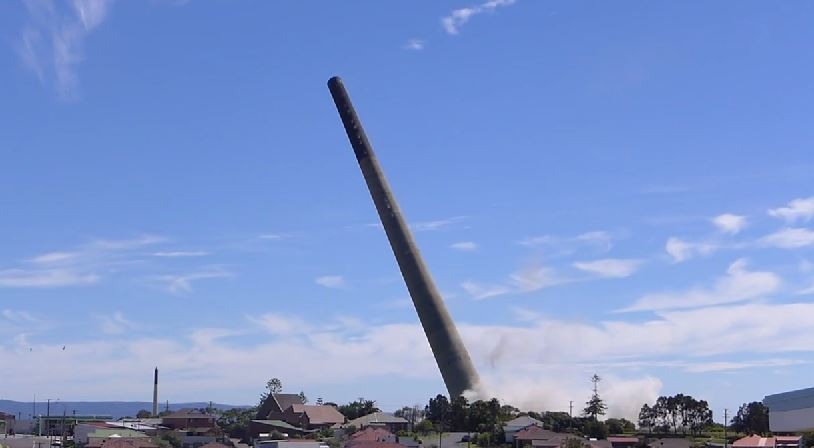
The stack falling during its demolition on 20 February 2014

Port Kembla was home to one of Australia's tallest industrial chimneys, a 198-metre-tall (650 ft) chimney built in 1965. Port Kembla Primary School was once located adjacent to it but was closed down due to pollution problems from the chimney including lead contaminated soil, acid rain and soot. A warning alarm was fitted to warn of high toxin levels. In November 2008, the Port Kembla stack was inspected and confirmed to have concrete cancer. The stack was planned to be demolished in early 2010 at a cost of A$10 million.

By 6 September 2010, plans to knock down the stack had been revised by the NSW Department of Planning. These plans included demolition of the existing Port Kembla Copper structures surrounding the chimney, excluding the locally heritage listed Precious Metals Mill Chimney and the Assay Offices. The work was due to start in the middle of 2011 with a team of 30 workers, under supervision by NSW Police, NSW WorkCover and relevant emergency services at a cost of A$8 million with an expected time frame of 16 months.

On 2 August 2013, it was announced that the stack would be demolished on Friday 6 September 2013. Due to asbestos concerns, the demolition was delayed. After no signs of danger were found, a new date was announced for the demolition: 20 February 2014.

On 20 February 2014, the copper stack was demolished.

=== Industrial pollution ===
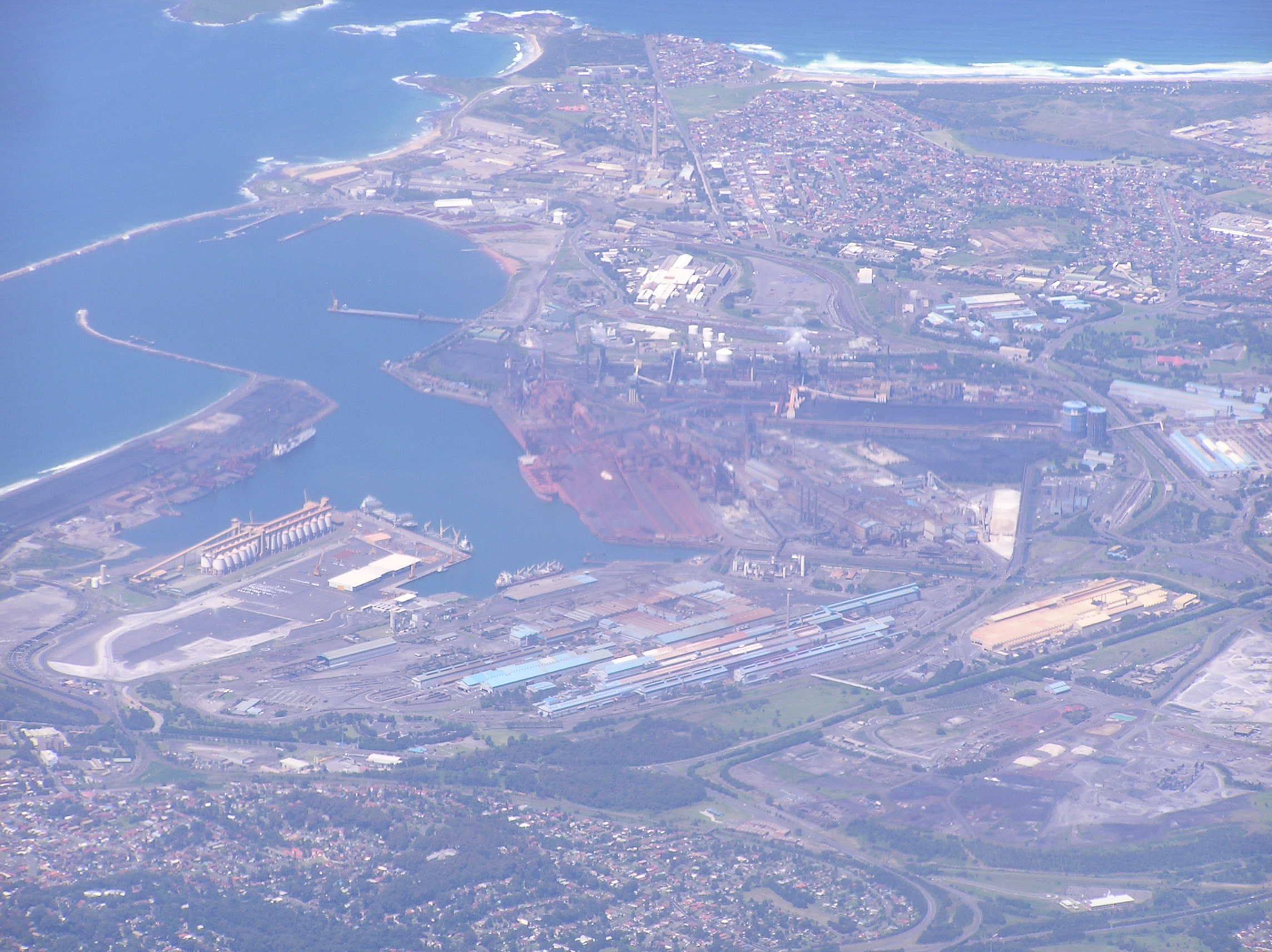
Aerial photo of Port Kembla from north west

In the past, Port Kembla's industrial heart was associated with significant industrial pollution including emissions of nitrogen oxides and other dangerous gases. However, the air quality around Port Kembla has improved dramatically over the past decade. At nearby Kembla Grange the average concentration of nitrogen dioxide (NO_{2}) measured by the NSW Department of Environment Climate Change halved between 2002 and 2014.

Back in the 1990s health problems were associated with noxious gases. One 1998 study of the industrial areas of Newcastle and Port Kembla found 'an important association between relatively low levels of particulate air pollution and respiratory symptoms' among primary school children. Fallout has also introduced elevated levels of lead and other heavy metals to the soil around Port Kembla and has formed thick deposits in many buildings and industrial structures.
