= Red Point (Port Kembla) =

Red Point (34°29′S 150°55′E) is a coastal headland at Port Kembla in New South Wales, Australia. Martin Islet lies just off the point.

The point was named by Captain Cook when he passed there on 25 April 1770 (ship's date), for "some part of the Land about it appeared of that Colour".
