= 87 Crown Street, Wollongong =

87 Crown Street
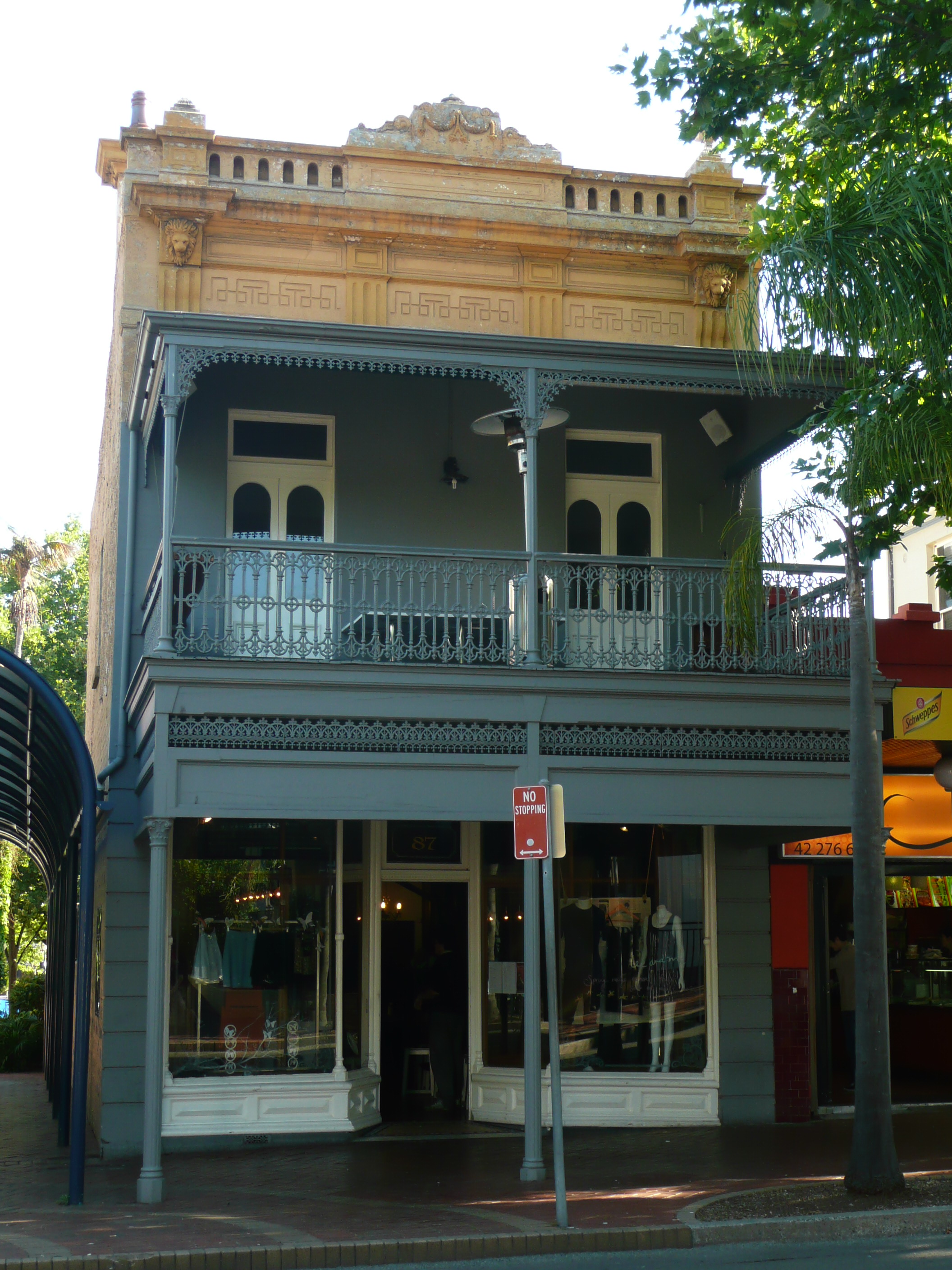
- 87 Crown St in 2009 with a previous tenant

- Location within New South Wales Location within Australia
- 34.4259°S 150.8982°E
- Location: 87 Crown Street, Wollongong, City of Wollongong, New South Wales, Australia

New South Wales Heritage Register
- Official name: Shop
- Type: state heritage (built)
- Designated: 2 April 1999
- Reference no.: 467
- Type: Shop
- Category: Retail and Wholesale

87 Crown Street is a heritage-listed shop in Wollongong, in the Illawarra region of New South Wales, Australia. It was added to the New South Wales State Heritage Register on 2 April 1999.

== History ==
It was built c. 1870s–1880s and has been in continuous use as retail premises since that time. It was used as W. McInnes' tailor shop c. 1900 and housed Coad's secondhand jewellery store from c. 1940–1960.

Since 2018, it has housed cafe Lee and Me.

It is close by a number of other historic or landmark buildings, including the Wollongong Town Hall and the Old Wollongong East Post Office.

== Description ==
It is a terrace shop with a decorative facade and verandah. It has been described as "one of Wollongong's last remaining commercial structures of the nineteenth century".

== Heritage listing ==
87 Crown St was listed on the New South Wales State Heritage Register on 2 April 1999.
