= Old Wollongong Telegraph and Post Office =

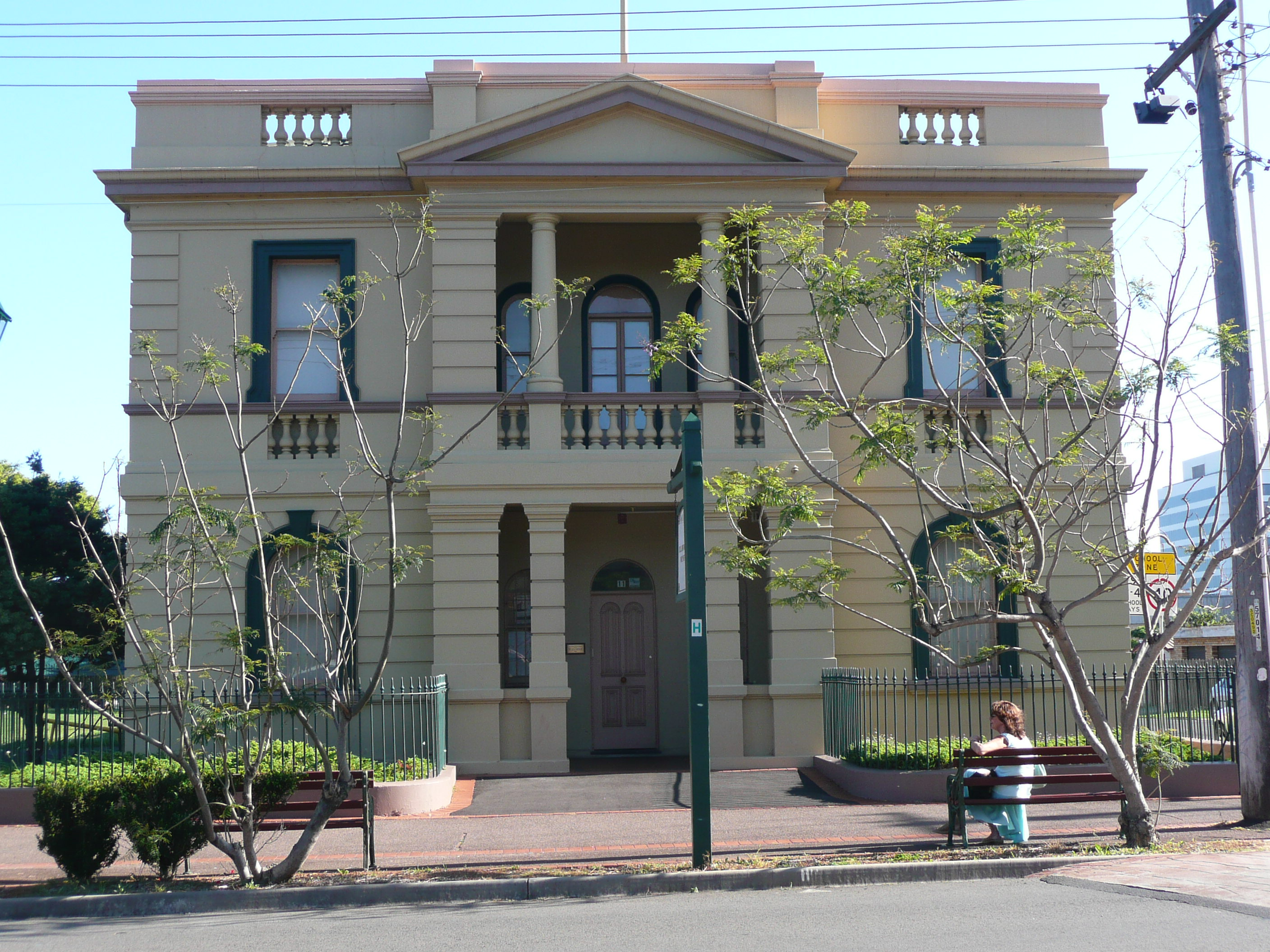
- Old Wollongong Telegraph and Post Office, pictured in 2009

- Location within New South Wales Location within Australia
- 34°25′29″S 150°54′04″E
- Location: 11 Market Street, Wollongong, City of Wollongong, New South Wales, Australia

History
- Built: 1864–1882

Site notes
- Architect(s): James Barnet (1882 extension and expansion)
- Owner: Wollongong City Council

New South Wales Heritage Register
- Official name: Original Wollongong Telegraph and Post Office; Illawarra Historical Society Museum; Wollongong Museum; Illawarra Museum
- Type: State heritage (built)
- Designated: 27 February 2015
- Reference no.: 1940
- Type: Post Office
- Category: Postal and Telecommunications
- Builders: S. E. Bloomfield (1864); George Brown (1870); George Billings (1882); Andrew Herd (1885); NSW Government (c. 1939)

The Old Wollongong Telegraph and Post Office is a heritage-listed former government offices, telegraph station and post office and now local history museum at 11 Market Street, Wollongong, in the City of Wollongong local government area of New South Wales, Australia. James Barnet designed the 1882 extension and expansion. The telegraph and post office was built from 1864 to 1882 in varying stage by S. E. Bloomfield (1864), George Brown (1870), George Billings (1882), Andrew Herd (1885) and the NSW Government (c. 1939). It is also known as Illawarra Historical Society Museum; Wollongong Museum; and Illawarra Museum. The property is owned by Wollongong City Council. It was added to the New South Wales State Heritage Register on 27 February 2015.

== History ==
=== Aboriginal land ===
For more than 30,000 years prior to European occupation, the Illawarra area was home to the Dharawal people and their ascendants and used for all manner of cultural and ceremonial activities. There was an abundance of food from the combined marine and riparian environment. Archaeological evidence of this extended occupation by the Aboriginal people is found in extensive middens in the area.

=== Colonial history ===
Following the colonisation of Sydney Harbour by the British convict settlement in 1788, the Wollongong area, 80 kilometres to the south, was slowly affected by European occupation. Although relationships between the Aboriginal people and early European settlers were initially peaceful, by the I830s they had deteriorated as a result of the Europeans laying claim to land. The Aboriginal population declined sharply but descendants continue to live in the area.

In 1809 the first official postal service in Australia was established when the Sydney merchant Isaac Nichols was appointed as the first postmaster in the colony of NSW in April 1809. Prior to this, mail delivery was neither secure nor reliable as it was distributed directly by the captain of the ship on which the mail arrived. Charles Throsby came down the escarpment at Bulli in 1815 and established grazing lands near the present harbour.

John Oxley surveyed the area in 1816, leading to the granting of land to selectors. The first official land grants in the Illawarra were made on 2 December 1816 or 24 January 1817.

During the 1820s shipments of produce and timber destined for the Sydney market as well as supplies into Wollongong were transferred by small flat bottomed boats to ships anchored off the beach. In 1825 the colonial administration in Sydney was empowered to establish a local postal service, which had previously been administered from Britain. In 1828, the first post offices outside Sydney were established, including offices in Bathurst, Campbelltown, Parramatta, Liverpool, Newcastle, Penrith and Windsor. By 1839, there were forty post offices in the colony and more post offices opened as settlement spread.

Between 1826 and the 1830s, a garrison was established in Wollongong in 1826, marking the official beginnings of European occupation. The settlement developed as a cedar port from 1826, and also as a dairying and agricultural centre. In the early days mail arrived in Wollongong once a week by boat and was administered from the court house. 'The amount of mail collected for and sent from Wollongong during the 1830s and '40s would fill no more than a saddlebag.'

Following a visit to the Illawarra in 1834, Governor Bourke proclaimed the Town of Wollongong as officially surveyed by Thomas Mitchell. In 1838 the postal service was shifted from the Wollongong's magistrate's office to E. Palmer's store. During the 1830s and 1840s Governor Bourke ordered the construction of a harbour at Wollongong. The work of excavating a safe harbour out of the headland was carried out by hundreds of convicts. The harbour enabled safe berthing for ships and expanded the commercial capacity of the region.

The first coal mine in the Illawarra was opened in 1849. By 1865 "mail deliveries to and from Wollongong had vastly improved. There was a daily delivery by horseback and a steamer called in at least three times per week".

The telegraph line linking Australia to the rest of the world arrived in Wollongong on 13 August 1862. In preparation, the Department of Public Works had advertised for tenders for land to build a telegraph station. The tender was awarded to Robert Haworth, who owned a large portion of land between Crown Street and Market Street and had been elected MLA to NSW Parliament in December 1860. The lot in Market Street on which the telegraph office was built, next to Haworth's Queen's Hotel, was valued at A£500 but there was talk that it went for A£5. Herben suggests that Haworth may have sold the land cheaply to the government in order to generate activity around his hotel. Indeed, the electric telegraph line was initially set up in Haworth's Queens Hotel while the telegraph office building was being completed. However the location was not very convenient to the Wollongong town centre.

In 1864 NSW Public Works tendered the construction work for the telegraph station to Mr S E Bloomfield of Wollongong. The overall cost of the building was A£670.

Herben reports an Illawarra Mercury published article of 20 September 1864 questioning the probity of the decision to locate the telegraph office Market Street, some blocks from the centre of the town. 'The story goes that it is the inconvenience of the whole town to gratify just one man. Why should everyone trudge a mile or half a mile or less daily just to benefit Mr Haworth? . . . "If there really be such an unusual and suspicious bargain in existence . . . the whole transaction from beginning to end demands investigation". No record of an official investigation has been found.

In 1868 a petition to the Mayor requested a public meeting to petition the government to erect a new post office in Wollongong. This petition was unsuccessful. In December 1869, a tender from John Brown was accepted "to extend the Telegraph Station building to allow the Post Office and Telegraph Station to be incorporated into the one building. The newspaper reported that a new wing was to be added to the building to be used as the post office". It is likely that the "time ball", erected on a post in the front of the single storey building, was added to the premises around this time:

'Just before 1 pm each day, the disc would be raised to the top of the pole. At 1 pm a telegram was received from Sydney to announce the time. Then the Postmaster would give the orders for the disc to be dropped and the military positioned on Flagstaff Hill would see the disc drop and then fire off a small old Crimean war relic. This small cannon could be heard around the district announcing the time and all householders would then set their clocks to the correct time.'

In 1879 the postmaster proposed that a storey be added to the building to provide further office space as well as residential accommodation for the postmaster. Colonial Architect James Barnet prepared drawings in 1880 for the first floor addition and also a new facade for the building, at a cost estimated at A£1,050. Although other plans were also in contention "Mr Barnet considered that his design was least expensive and more ornamental.". While the new storey was being added, post and telegraph services were temporarily relocated to the empty old Royal Hotel on the corner of Crown and Corrimal Streets. By 1882 the now two-storey post and telegraph office was completed and its time ball was placed on the roof.

In 1885 a second, larger "Battery room" was built on the west fence line to a design by Barnet and constructed by Andrew Herd & Son whose tender proposed a cost of 327 pounds. Further alterations costing A£110, unspecified, were undertaken at this time. In 1887 a railway linked the northern mines to Wollongong and to Sydney, meaning the more costly and hazardous jetties were no longer needed. Among other impacts, the railway moved the centre of the town away from the harbour, but brought more tourism to the region as visitors came to see the sublime view from Bulli Pass. In 1889 local lobbying finally resulted in a more conveniently located post and telegraph office for Wollongong being built on Crown Street, next to the Town Hall, known as the East Wollongong Post Office (also designed by the Colonial Architect's Office, completed in 1892 and listed on the State Heritage Register No.1616). The time ball was relocated to the top of the new building where it remained in operation until c. 1910.

From the 1890s to 1964 the old telegraph and post office building remained in the ownership of the NSW Government. It was first used as the offices of the Wollongong Harbour Trust, but this organisation was disbanded in 1895. 'The next tenant was the Department of Public Works. The upstairs became the residence for the Manager of the Public Works and his family. The Department of Public Works, at that time, was constructing the breakwater at Port Kembla Bay. Other users of the building were the Dole and Food clothing ticket office during the Depression of the 1930s followed by the Recruiting Office from 1939 until 1945, the Electoral Office 1946–47, the Motor Registry Office from 1947 and then the Department of Labour and Industry until late 1964.'

=== History since Federation ===
Following the Federation of the Australian colonies into a single nation in 1901, all post and telegraph offices were passed onto the Commonwealth Government. In 1928 The Hoskins iron and steel works opened in 1928, and were taken over by BHP in 1935. In c. 1940 a freestanding air raid shelter was constructed at the rear of the premises of the former post office building during the early years of World War II. The floor was concrete with walls of double brick and the roof at least 100 to 125 mm solid reinforced concrete. There was a blast wall on the northern end, allowing for safety from explosions. The blast wall was removed prior to 1966.

The Illawarra Historical Society was founded in 1944 following a public meeting called by the Mayor of Wollongong. 'The development of a collection of objects, photographs and documents was an integral part of the original purpose of the Society" and members began collating their collections of small local artefacts and photographs. After some years of being stored in members" homes, the first formal repository for the collection was the World War II air raid shelter originally located in Crown Street between the Town Hall and the East Wollongong Post Office.

In c. 1950s a fibro garage was constructed on the premises of the former post office building, with a driveway entrance onto Queens Parade, also a rotary clothes hoist (located behind the 1885 Battery Room), all since demolished. In 1963 the Illawarra Historical Society wrote to Council proposing a need for museum premises for their local historical collections and suggesting possible sites in the locality (the old Court House near Wollongong Harbour and the old Bulli Council Chambers were both considered). The 150 year anniversary of colonisation of the region on 2 December 1966 was approaching and they wished to commence preparations for celebrations (letter dated 22 February in Council file D336/63). In 1965 the Illawarra Historical Society became aware of the now empty former Telegraph and Post Office building and began lobbying state and local government to make it available to the society for use as an office and museum.

Council's Financial Committee resolved to join the society in celebrating the sesquicentenary and to investigate acquiring the former Telegraph and Post Office building for the society's premises. Council wrote to local state members of Parliament, Douglas Porter and Jack Hough, seeking their assistance in making representations to the New South Wales Government about Council acquiring the building. Jack Hough in turn corresponded with the Minister for Public Works and the Minister for Lands. In April Council inspected the building and its financial committee recommended that if acquired, Council should be appointed trustee for the building, it should be offered to the Illawarra Historical Society for use as a museum and that Council should be responsible for maintenance. The site would be defined as a "Reserve for Preservation of Historical Sites and Buildings" under the Crown Consolidation Act.

In 1966 the Illawarra Historical Society took possession of the lower floor of the building following receipt of a letter from Council dated 25 August 1966 which provided for the Historical Society to occupy the ground floor free of charge for the purpose of establishing a Museum, and for control of the Museum to be left in the hands of the Historical Society, with the establishment and housing of exhibits to be at the society's expense. Council also resolved consider payment of a yearly subsidy to the Historical Society.' (Herben, 2013, p. 26 Initially the upstairs apartment continued to be let to tenants; goods continued to be stored in the garage by the Department of Labour and Industry and in the former air raid shelter by the Electoral Office; and several rooms upstairs were in use by Civil Defence. Within several years, under pressure from the historical society, these other occupants had vacated the premises. The museum was officially opened on 2 December 1966, understood to be the 150th anniversary of the granting of the first land for settlement in the Illawarra on 2 December 1816. Mr T.L. Lewis, Minister for Lands and Mines, officially handed the keys of the building to the Society President Mr Edgar Beale The museum in these early days was open seven days a week and ran by volunteer labour. At first, no volunteer was issued with a key. Instead, a central location was selected that everyone knew where to obtain the key. For example, for a time Mr Purcell who lived on the northeast corner of Corrimal and Market Streets had the key hidden in the greenhouse at the rear of his home.

In 1968 an early slab timber 'stockman's hut' said to date from c. 1816 was relocated to the rear yard of the museum. The structure is understood to have come from "Exmouth", Richard Brooks's estate at Yallah, one of the first land grants made in the Illawarra. The slab hut had been previously relocated to Mount Brown where it had been used as a feed shed but in 1968 was slated for demolition to make way for the southern freeway. Instead members of the society were given permission to dismantle it and reassemble it at the museum. Ken Thomas completed the building of the hut in 1979, including installing a cow dung floor.

A 'blacksmith's shop' was built by Ken and Don Thomas between 1971 and 1972 on the premises using historic timbers obtained in 1967 from the demolition of Goldena Cottage at Marshall Mount near Dapto, the original home of the Adam and Sarah Denniss family dating from the c.1850s ('Timeless Wollongong', Wollongong Advertiser 31 August 2011, quoted in Herben, 2013, 031) On 24 August 1974 the society celebrated the opening of a "colonial kitchen" built into the former 1885 Battery Room. A large window facing onto Queens Parade was removed and placed into storage. A fire crane was used to install a false open fireplace in its place, white hessian was tacked to the ceiling and the kitchen decorated with furniture salvaged from Goldena Cottage, the Denniss homestead at Marshall Mount which had been demolished in 1967.

On 20 January 1978 NSW Government transferred ownership of the building to Wollongong City Council. The unimproved capital value of the land was then estimated at $24,000. In 1985 the National Trust of Australia (NSW) added the "Museum Formerly Post Office" to its register of historic properties, no.5960. In 1987 Council obtained funds to employ a professional museum curator, with $20,000 towards this expense supplied by Council in 1987 and $10,000 in 1989. The curator in 1989 was Dianne Shultz-Tesmar.

The Australian Postal Corporation Act, 1989 established Australia Post as a self-funding entity, heralding a new direction in property management, including a move away from the larger more traditional buildings, towards smaller, shopfront-style post offices. With the advent of new digital technology requiring smaller spaces, Telstra (originally Telecom) was also taking a new direction in property management by withdrawing from larger telephone exchanges and former post offices, to smaller, more cost-efficient premises. In 1997 Australia Post made a donation to the society of a red cedar post office counter from the original Camden Post Office, which was ceremonially gifted to the society by the Chair of the Heritage Council of NSW, Hazel Hawke, in April 1997. In 2008 a block of land at the rear of the property known as 'Lane 21' had been unoccupied for about a century and following a fruitless search for its ownership was compulsorily acquired by Council, zoned as community land and leased to the museum for parking and providing access to the backyard of the museum.

In 2014 the Collections Australia Network describes the museum and its collection:

'The Museum operates on a voluntary basis. The objects collected and displayed relate to Illawarra's past with particular emphasis on the years at the close of the 19th Century. The Society has a collection of over 9,000 photographs in custody of Wollongong City Library and has also published many books on local history. The collection presents a picture of pioneer life including settlement, education, agriculture, mining, transport and trade. The entrance room features a magnificent cedar Post Office counter and a video portrays the lifestyle and times of an early Postmaster. The collection relates to the pioneers of Illawarra. . . Social history story, furnished rooms relating to Postmaster and family working and living in a pre federation Post and Telegraph office.'

The museum collection of moveable heritage is not included in this SHR listing, although it may be of state significance and worthy of being listed. Extracts from Kylie Winkworth assessment of significance of the Illawarra Historical Society museum collection, 2011:

'The Illawarra Historical Society's museum holds a significant collection assembled by generations of volunteers since the inception of the Society in 1944. The development of a collection of objects, photographs and documents was an integral part of the original purpose of the Society. . . 'The early years of the museum's development were marked by great enthusiasm, and generous donations from many old families in the district and local businesses. Almost all the objects in the collection were owned and donated by local residents, and were made or used in the Illawarra. The gift of many significant family treasures is a mark of the confidence that the Society's members and community supporters have in the museum and its management.

'In the 45 years since the museum opened, the collection has been well managed and curated, within the constraints of a volunteer managed museum collection. Research and investigation of the collection during 2010 underlines its high significance for the people of the Illawarra and NSW.

'The Society has around 20,000 objects that span the key themes, activities, people, places and events in the history and development of the Illawarra. Most of the collection dates from the second half of the nineteenth century up to the mid twentieth century. The collection mirrors the themes in the Thematic History of the City of Wollongong. It also documents aspects of women's history, and family and domestic history; themes which are not generally considered in place-based heritage studies, which are commissioned to assist heritage conservation and local environment plans.'

Winkworth's summary statement of significance:

'The Illawarra Historical Society collection is historically significant for its associations with the settlement and development of the Illawarra and Wollongong, a region which was and still is an important manufacturing centre and a source of exports and wealth for NSW and Australia. From the second half of the nineteenth century Wollongong was a centre of trade, industry and innovation and this is reflected in many themes including maritime history, farming, retailing, mining and manufacturing, including the sectioned Owen sub machine gun, designed in Wollongong and manufactured at Port Kembla.

'The collection is significant for its rare, provenanced, locally made vernacular and improvised artefacts which demonstrate the skills and ingenuity of settlers and their way of life, both in the Illawarra and, by extension, Australia. These items include a rare provenanced cabbage tree hat and an important collection of vernacular furniture. Turning points, tragedies and pivotal developments in the history of the region and the nation are reflected in the collection, including poignant artefacts associated with the 1902 Mt Kembla mine explosion which killed 96 men and boys and is one of Australia's worst peacetime disasters. Almost all the objects in the collection were owned and donated by local residents and were made or used in the Illawarra, making a collection of high social value for the people of the Illawarra.

'The collection has research significance and the potential to interpret the history, heritage, identity and character of the Illawarra and Wollongong, which is an important centre of population and industry in NSW. Although it is primarily pre 1950, the collection touches on themes and activities that are still highly relevant to contemporary life in the region, such as innovation, mining, manufacturing and making do, land development, migration and making a home in a new land. The collection's scope, quality and links local people, places and stories, makes it one of the most significant historical society collections in NSW. The collection is in many ways one of the hidden treasures of the Illawarra.'

=== Comparisons ===
Historical Society Museum Buildings

Although there is no thematic survey of local historical society museums, there are probably dozens across NSW, and most would similarly be located in historic buildings. Other historic buildings in NSW which have been adaptively re-used from their original functions into local history museums and listed on the SHR include: Berry Museum (formerly a bank building dating from 1884); St Claire Museum, Goulburn (formerly a residence dating from 1840s); Hastings Historical Society Museum, Port Macquarie (formerly a residence dating from 1830s) and Braidwood District Historical Society Museum (formerly a commercial building dating from late 19th century).

Collection

The collection's scope and themes have much in common with other historical society collections formed around the 1950s. Port Macquarie Historical Society's collection, begun in 1956, is one of similar scope and significance. They share common themes as well as representing coastal communities with mainly small land holdings, now greatly changed through industrialisation in the case of Illawarra, and sea change development in the case of Port Macquarie. Both collections have particular strengths in material from the early years their region's development. Other historical society collections formed in this period, such as Orange (1949) and Lithgow (1947), have not survived with such depth in the range and scope of the collection, nor with so many well provenanced items made in the district or owned by local families. Comparing the collection with those in other centres of industry, such as Newcastle and Lithgow, highlights the depth and quality of the Illawarra collection. Newcastle Historical Society formed in 1936, no longer manages a museum, although some of its collection is in the Newcastle Library and Regional Museum.' Kylie Winkworth mentioned local history museums in 'Port Macquarie, Wingham, Bega, Molong, etc. all of which probably merit listing'.

== Description ==
Located 80 kilometres (50 mi) south of Sydney, Wollongong sits on a narrow coastal strip bordered by the Royal National Park to the north, Lake Illawarra to the south, and the scenic Illawarra escarpment to the west.

The former Wollongong Telegraph and Post Office, now known as the Illawarra Historical Society Museum, is a substantial, two storey late Victorian public building located near the centre of a regional city which retains many Classical and Italianate architectural details both externally and internally. The building is rendered and painted to imitate the pattern of ashlar stonework. Its decorative details include moulded window surrounds with keystone motifs, rusticated quoins, false balconettes to the upper storey windows, and a balcony above the recessed front porch which has a plain pediment supported on Doric columns. The simple parapet has masonry balustrade sections. The main portion of the building has a replacement concrete tile roof while wings at the rear have replacement hipped corrugated iron roofs. The chimneys retain their slate pots. There is a small porch at the rear covering the residential entrance. At the front there is a dwarf wall and iron fence dating from 1883.

The interior has a modest but well made Victorian staircase dating from 1882. There is a red cedar post office counter which was relocated to the Illawarra Museum in 1997 from its original home in the Camden Post Office. This however, like the rest of the museum moveable heritage collection, is not included in this SHR listing. The former residential portion of the building, on the first floor, has marble fireplaces and pressed metal ceilings. There are internal ceilings of slat timber on the ground floor. The pull chain cistern toilets dating from 1924 to 1925 are still in use in 2014. The original front door has been removed but remains on site, repositioned on the doorway to a storeroom in the rear courtyard. Ideally this door should be restored to its original position.

Several structures have been added into the rear yard during occupation by the Illawarra Historical Society since 1966. There is a relocated 'stockman's hut', re-assembled in the museum in 1968 and said to date from c.1816. There is a 'blacksmith's shop' constructed by the society in 1972 using historic timbers obtained from the demolition of Goldena Cottage at Marshall Mount, the original home of the Denniss family dating from c.1850. There is a "colonial kitchen" which was assembled by the society in 1974 within the 1885 Battery Room also using furnishings from Goldena Cottage.

The Illawarra Historical Society Museum's collection of moveable heritage objects may be of state significance but requires a separate SHR nomination and assessment process. None of this collection is included in this SHR listing, Likely state significant elements within the museum collection include:

- A well provenance cabbage tree hat made by Sarah Denniss c. 1900 using palm leaves collected by Aboriginal people in exchange for damper (Winkworth, 2011;
- A group of five Windsor-style cedar chairs made by Lionel Hurry c.1860-1870, an important provenanced example of vernacular furniture;
- An 1891 model of the Austinmer jetty with a collier ship moored beside;
- An 1887 teaset featuring a proposed redevelopment scheme for Wollongong Harbour (never built);
- Aboriginal breast plates for Charley Hookah, King of Mullet Creek, William Derby, King of Dapto and William Saddler King of Illawarra, dated 1909;
- A horse hoof relic from the Mount Kembla Mine Disaster 1902;
- The first "ambulance litter" in Wollongong, a stretcher on wheels dating from 1908;
- A sectioned Owen sub machine gun, designed in Wollongong by local resident Evelyn Ernest Owen, one of more than 45,000 Owen guns manufactured by Lysaght's in Port Kembla during World War II.

=== Condition ===
As at 29 July 2014, considered good.

=== Modifications and dates ===
- 1864 – The original building as described by Carol Herben:

'It had a shingle roof. . . Room in the new Telegraph Station was limited. There was only an entry or foyer and to the left was a counter for service by the Telegraphic staff. Above the counter space is a window of two rows of glass panels. There was an open area behind the counter, which served as an office and to the right was the room for sending and receiving (presently the kitchen.) . . . There is a small niche in the wall, which housed an instrument indicating the direction from where the Telegraphic message came from. Positioned on the southeast corner of the allotment was a toilet. A set of double gates opened up onto [the rear]. The earliest plans show that there was a proposal to build a stable for a horse.'

- 1869 – First major extension of the original building to include a one-storey post office alongside the original telegraph office. Carol Herben explains:

'The extension to the building consisted of removing the rear wall of the telegraph station by extending the (east) room to meet up with the transmission room (kitchen). . . John Brown completed extensions on the east side by bringing the transmission room into the main building. Indication that the east room was extended to meet the transmission room is that in the east room beam was fitted east to west. This is where the back wall of the Telegraph Office was removed. Further evidence can be found on the exterior east wall where two round top windows show the original section of the 1864 building and the other window located next on the east wall. 'From the foyer or entry, a counter was placed and duplicated the same as the Telegraph section and above the counter was a double glass panel. There is a marked difference between the two sets of glass panelling with the east side one predating the western side. The western side was to be the postal department. The next room where the staircase is now located was initially the mailroom. . . The rear room became the Post and Telegraph Masters Office. 'Doorways were provided at the rear of the premises. The original doorway from the 1864 construction has a fanlight above the front door same as the rear door of the foyer. The doors from the 1870 construction and alterations show that the door from the east room is the narrowest. This was unfortunate as this also indicates that the doorway was a last minute addition of the infill section. . . . A doorway was cut through the old transmission room (kitchen) facing onto the courtyard. The brickwork above the door also indicates that it is from the 1870s. . . on the easternmost side (exterior) of the building are two windows with curved tops indicating the original portion of the 1864 construction. The infill window is smaller and square topped indicating that the wall had been filled in by John Brown.' 'At the rear of the premises is a [the first] battery room (laundry) installed in 1870. Indications are that this room was not part of the original fabric of the building as the brickwork above the windows and doors show that they have been constructed the same time as the western section of the building. According to Wikipedia, "A battery room is a room in a [telecommunications] facility used to house batteries for backup or uninterruptible power systems. . . . Battery rooms were used to segregate the fumes and corrosive chemicals of wet cell batteries from the operating equipment; a separate room also allowed better control of temperature and ventilation for the batteries. . ." ('Battery room' accessed 28 July 2014)

- 1880–1882 – Top floor and new facade added to building to design by James Barnet, Colonial Architect's Office. The top floor consisted of a large apartment for use by the postmaster's family and some office space. When the second storey was added, 'six courses of bricks were added to the exterior and interior walls to raise the height of the ceilings of the ground floor. These courses can be clearly seen on the exterior wall of the foyer facing the courtyard.'
- Late 1920s–30s – After sewerage was laid in Wollongong in 1924, changes were made to bathroom facilities throughout the building. One toilet was added on the western boundary, previously a walkway, and another next to the present kitchen. Both of these have identical windows of louvre glass and are comparatively the same size. The battery room was divided by a wall and a concrete floor was laid at the eastern side for a male toilet. The floor in the other section was already paved with bricks. A pair of concrete tubs turned that area into a laundry. . . On the first floor, the south-easterly section of the building had a room divided to become a bathroom. It had a toilet, bath and hand basin installed. The smaller room had a sink installed and later a stove to serve as a kitchenette. . . as all toilets have wall mounted pull chain cisterns. The toilet bowls are unique as they are from different periods. All U bends are set close to the back. Internal doors date from the 1920s-30s. 'They are located at different rooms and would have been installed during the occupancy of the building by the Department of Public Works'.
- 1966 – Illawarra Historical Society took up residency in the building. The building at that time was described by Wollongong Council's health officer:

'The building is a substantial two-storey brick structure with a garage and outbuilding situated in the rear yard of the premises... The building is in reasonable condition and would require comparatively little modification...

'(a) Up-Stairs Flat: There is a large flat upstairs, which is apparently quite habitable. In the kitchen is a gas stove, which appears to be in good condition and an electric sink heater... power and gas are not connected. There is a stainless steel sink with water supply and drainage. The bath in the bathroom is in good condition and the gas bath heater.... A sewered toilet is located in the bathroom; this also is in working order. A laundry is contained in a room off the yard and contains a double set of cement tubs and a gas copper, which appears to be in working order. The flat requires a thorough cleaning before occupation and some minor repairs to windows, doors, etc.

'(b) Down-Stairs Section of Building: The main part of the down-stairs section of the building is also in fair condition, but some repairs will be necessary to skirting boards, floorboards, wall plaster, windows and doors. This part of the building is also badly littered with miscellaneous rubbish... This also applies to a toilet structure off the back yard also. The floors generally have been covered with Masonite sheeting, and at the moment are also covered by a paper felt underlay... the linoleum should be replaced in due course. It is considered that absolute basic essential repairs could be made to the building for approximately $200, but to bring the building to a generally satisfactory state would cost considerably more...'

- 1966 – The backyard was overgrown with weeds, grass and rubbish. The only ground cover was concrete that is still in place in 2014. There were also some original telegraph wires present - three strands of wires ran from under the eave of the south-west corner of the second floor to the roof of the staff kitchen.
- 1968 – Council Expenditure Authority recommended that $617 be voted for the purpose of replacing the defective timber floor in the centre section (foyer) with reinforced concrete on sand filling and to sand and Estapol the remaining ground floor. The floor was replaced in November 1968.
- 1969 – An awning at the rear of the building was erected at a cost of $438, half paid by the historical society and half by Council. The remainder of wooden floors throughout the ground floor of the building were removed and a concrete slab poured in their place.
- 1970 – Council replaced the old water pipes and installed copper pipes at a cost of $250.
- 1972 – The south wall of the kitchen had the cement render removed and was replastered due to the dampness. Society members carried out this work.
- 1977 – As the concrete roof of the air raid shelter had cracks in it and was no longer keeping out rainwater the Council installed a clip-lock roof on top of the concrete.
- 1978 – Wollongong Council engaged contractors to seal the foundations from rising dam, using Drystat. Cement render on the exterior of the building was stripped during this process and required replacement. Also at this time, that the floor under the stairs cupboard was concreted, remaining rotted skirting boards were replaced and the walls inside replastered. The museum was closed while these repairs were carried out.
- 1979 – A 'stockman's hut' said to date from 1816 was relocated and reassembled in the rear yard of the museum. It is understood to have come from "Exmouth", Richard Brooks's estate at Yallah, one of the first five land grants made in the Illawarra. The slab hut had been previously relocated to Mount Brown where it had been used as a feed shed.
- 1980 – The side porch on Queens Parade was underpinned.
- 1981 – The entire building was re-wired for electricity. The front door to the main building was removed and replaced with another door. The air raid shelter had two windows fitted on the western wall and a roller door installed on the southern end wall.
- 1983 – A covered extension to the livery and a storeroom at the rear of the block were erected, supported by a grant of $59,000 under the "Red Scheme". The society placed a plaque next to the original front door identifying its origin.
- 1988 – The building was underpinned based on a quote for $3,800 from the Superior Paving and Concreting Company.
- 1989 – It was agreed that damp proofing carried out in 1978 had not been effective and that the building had structural problems. Council and the society applied for grants from various funding bodies including the Heritage Branch of the Department of Planning, the NSW Ministry for the Arts, the NSW Minister for Local Government and the National Estate Grants Program. Works included 'gutter replacement, structural cracks in walls, rising damp, additional underpinning, internal and external painting'.
- 1990 – Advice was sought from Council's consulting architect, Andrew Conacher, who supplied a schedule of works including a map of the building showing the extent of cracks in the north and west walls.
- 1991 – In May and June 1991 Council paved the entry and side paths with red bitumen with pavers as trim and then tiled the front porch. An internal windowsill and some doorframes were replaced in June. Council also patched the stairwell where cement render had fallen off. A spoon drain was installed on the eastern side of the air raid shelter. Guttering was placed on the air raid shelter. The floor and ceiling of the upstairs front balcony were repaired and waterproofed. A laundry window was replaced. The skirting boards in the colonial kitchen were replaced. Drainage works were commenced. Further damp proofing was undertaken.
- 1992 – The down-stairs rooms and stairs were carpeted. Council installed security grills on all ground floor windows.
- 1995 – The air raid shelter was divided to create more storage space. The Society placed glass partitions upstairs in the parlour and bedroom (at a cost of $5,426) and a glass partition in the colonial kitchen (at a cost of $2,175).
- 1996 – Roof tiles were repaired and coated. The corrugated iron on the Blacksmith's shop and Stockman's Hut was replaced.
- 1997 – The Society erected a garden shed for a small workshop and storage behind the Stockman's Hut.
- 1998 – Council carpenters covered the air raid shelter windows as the timber frames had rotted. A brick floor was installed in the garden shed by Wollongong Heights Lions Club.
- 1999 – The flat was finally converted to museum use with the removal of the sink, stove, bath and both hot water heaters allowing for filing and storage areas attached to the office.
- 2002 – Council painted the exterior of building.
- 2003 – Damaged rear gates were repaired with new hinges.
- 2006 – New roofing was installed over the colonial kitchen and lady's toilet.
- 2007 – Council installed a smoke detection system throughout the main building including the outbuildings and livery. The front doorstep was replaced after becoming soft and flaking with a recycled slate slab. The rotted wooden beam above the roller door on the air raid shelter was replaced with a steel beam.
- 2009 – The roof was replaced on the storeroom and livery.
- 2011 – The kitchen and laundry roofs were replaced and downpipes and gutters installed on these buildings and on the air raid shelter and blacksmith's shop. Drainage was installed on the eastern side of the premises from the blacksmith's shop and air raid shelter through the car park to the drains in the street.
- 2012 – After large pieces of cement plaster fell from under the staircase, the plaster was glued back to the lathe boards. New downpipes were installed on the air raid shelter. The roofs on the kitchen in the main building and laundry were replaced, and PVC downpipes installed on the eastern side of the main building.
- c. 2013 – The driveway from the 1950s fibro garage to Queens Parade was removed.

== Heritage listing ==
As at 20 October 2014, The original Wollongong Telegraph and Post Office is of state historic and aesthetic significance as a mid nineteenth century regional government building which was substantially expanded and improved in 1882 with the addition of a second story and façade designed by Colonial Architect James Barnett. It retains some Classical and Italianate architectural detailing both externally and internally. Its intact air raid shelter dating from World War II is rare at the state level. The building is of state significance for being representative of purpose-built telegraph offices in regional settings, of historic government buildings with long histories of adaptation to changing government requirements and of historic buildings used as museum premises by local historical associations across NSW. The museum's collection, although not included in this listing, has been assessed as significant.

Original Wollongong Telegraph and Post Office was listed on the New South Wales State Heritage Register on 27 February 2015 having satisfied the following criteria.

The place is important in demonstrating the course, or pattern, of cultural or natural history in New South Wales.

The original Wollongong Telegraph and Post Office, dating from 1864, is of state historical significance as an early purpose-built telegraph office and later also post office building in a regional centre. Its history of changing uses, alterations and additions demonstrates a broader history of adaptation of government buildings to changing regional needs. Owned by Wollongong City Council since 1978 the building has been occupied by the Illawarra Historical Society and operated as a museum of local history since 1966. The museum's collection of moveable heritage about the history of the Illawarra district, although not included in the listing, has been assessed as highly significant.

Postal offices in Australia were historically responsible for a wide variety of community services including mail distribution, acting as an agency for the Commonwealth Savings Bank, taking electoral enrolments and providing telegraph and telephone services. The town post office often served as a focal point for the community. It was usually built in a prominent position in the centre of town, close to other public buildings and helped create a nucleus of civic buildings which attracted community pride. Telecommunications have played a central role in developing lines of communication within Australia, and between Australians and the rest of the world, and have had a major role in the development of local, regional and national economies.

The place has a strong or special association with a person, or group of persons, of importance of cultural or natural history of New South Wales's history.

The original Wollongong Telegraph and Post Office building and its museum collection is likely to have local significance for its associations with society members such as Edgar Beale and Joyce McCarthy. Beale was one of the foundation members of the society and a descendant of Charles Throsby Smith and the Beale family (piano and sewing machine manufacturers). During the 43 years of his involvement in the society, he held various positions on the executive, including president and the first honorary curator (1964-5). McCarthy's dedicated work with the collection, including 25 years as honorary curator from 1984, was responsible for major improvements in collection management. She was awarded an OAM in recognition of her work for the society and local history and a room for temporary exhibitions in the museum, the Joyce O. McCarthy room, has been named after her.

The place is important in demonstrating aesthetic characteristics and/or a high degree of creative or technical achievement in New South Wales.

The original Wollongong Telegraph and Post Office building is of state aesthetic significance as a 1864 regional government building which was substantially expanded in 1882 with the addition of an additional storey and facade designed by Colonial Architect James Barnett. It retains some Classical and Italianate architectural detailing both externally and internally. It is a local landmark.

The place has a strong or special association with a particular community or cultural group in New South Wales for social, cultural or spiritual reasons.

The original Wollongong Telegraph and Post Office building is likely to have local social significance as the home of the Illawarra Historical Society since 1966. Furthermore, almost all the objects in the collection were owned and donated by local residents and were made or used in the Illawarra, making a collection of high local social significance for the people of the Illawarra.

The place possesses uncommon, rare or endangered aspects of the cultural or natural history of New South Wales.

The original Wollongong Telegraph and Post Office building's intact air raid shelter dating from World War II is rare at the state level.

The place is important in demonstrating the principal characteristics of a class of cultural or natural places/environments in New South Wales.

The original Wollongong Telegraph and Post Office building is of state significance for being representative of purpose-built telegraph offices in regional settings, of historic government buildings with long histories of adaptation to changing government requirements and of historic buildings used as museum premises by local historical associations across NSW.

The air raid shelter in the rear courtyard is of state representative significance as a rare surviving example of concrete structures built in coastal localities to protect people in the vicinity from military attack by Japanese forces during World War II.

== See also ==
- List of post office buildings in New South Wales
