= Old Wollongong East Post Office =

- Location within New South Wales Location within Australia
- 34.4259°S 150.8980°E
- Location: 91 Crown Street, Wollongong, New South Wales, Australia

History
- Built: 1890–1892

Site notes
- Architect: Colonial Architect's Office
- Owner: Wollongong City Council

New South Wales Heritage Register
- Official name: Wollongong East Post Office; Wollongong post office
- Type: state heritage (built)
- Designated: 24 January 2003
- Reference no.: 1616
- Type: Post Office
- Category: Postal and Telecommunications
- Builders: Messrs Banks and Whitehouse

Old Wollongong East Post Office is a heritage-listed former post office, telegraph office and telephone exchange at 91 Crown Street, Wollongong, New South Wales, Australia. It was designed by the NSW Colonial Architect's Office and built from 1890 to 1892 by Messrs Banks and Whitehouse. Prior to 1968, it was also known as Wollongong Post and Telegraph Office or Wollongong Post Office. It was added to the New South Wales State Heritage Register on 24 January 2003.

== History ==
=== Background ===
The first official postal service in Australia was established in April 1809, when the Sydney merchant Isaac Nichols was appointed as the first Postmaster in the colony of NSW. Prior to this, mail delivery was neither secure nor reliable as it was distributed directly by the captain of the ship on which the mail arrived. In 1825 the colonial administration was empowered to establish a Postmaster General's department, which had previously been administered from Britain.

In 1828, the first post offices outside Sydney were established, which included offices in Bathurst, Campbelltown, Parramatta, Liverpool, Newcastle, Penrith and Windsor. By 1839, there were forty post offices in the colony; more post offices opened as settlement spread.

During the 1860s, the advance of postal services was further increased as the railway network was established throughout NSW. In 1863, the Postmaster General, W. H. Christie, noted that accommodation facilities for postmasters in some post offices were quite limited, and stated that it was a matter of importance that "post masters should reside and sleep under the same roof as the office".

Electric communication came to NSW in 1858 when the first telegraph lines were opened in Sydney; lines connecting the Sydney GPO to the South Head Signal Station and to Liverpool. Further development in NSW was slow compared to other states, with the Government actively concentrating on the development of country offices before suburban offices.

In 1862, James Barnet was appointed Acting Colonial Architect. His appointment coincided with a considerable increase in funding to public works programs, many of which included the construction of new post and telegraph offices. Indeed, between 1865 and 1890, the Colonial Architect's Office was responsible for the construction and maintenance of 169 post and telegraph offices throughout NSW.

In 1870 the postal and telegraph departments were amalgamated, after which time new post and telegraph offices were constructed to include both services. The first significant telephone experiments in Australia were conducted in Sydney in January 1878, with three tests being carried out between La Perouse and Sydney. The Sydney Morning Herald of 14 January 1878 wrote: 'Our readers are probably aware that a discovery has been made in the art of telegraphy which when fully developed may lead to an entirely new and simple system of communication.' It wasn't until 1 November 1880, however, that what is claimed to be the first telephone service in NSW was established between the Exchange and the Government woolsheds at Darling Harbour.

On 11 October 1881, the first telephone exchange was opened in Sydney and, following the establishment of the switchboard, the Electric Telegraph Department took over the telephone system and relocated it to the GPO. From this point onwards, the growth of telephone lines expanded rapidly and, by March 1883, the exchange had become important enough to warrant a twenty-four hour service.

As with the telegraph, the telephone system soon began to extend into the country areas, with telephone exchanges appearing in NSW country towns from the late-1880s onwards. Again, the post office was responsible for the public telephone exchange, which further emphasised its place in the community as the provider of communications services.

The construction of new post offices continued throughout the 1890s Depression years of the late-nineteenth century under the leadership of Walter Liberty Vernon, who held office from 1890 to 1911. However, while twenty-seven post offices were built between 1892 and 1895, funding to the Government Architect's Office was cut from 1893 to 1895, which caused Vernon to postpone a number of projects.

Following Federation in 1901, the Commonwealth Government took over responsibility for post, telegraph and telephone offices. The Department of Home Affairs Works Division was made responsible for post office construction. In 1916, construction of post offices and telephone exchanges was transferred to the Department of Works & Railways, after which the Department of the Interior became responsible during World War II.

On 22 December 1975, the Postmaster General's Department was abolished and replaced by the Post and Telecommunications Department, resulting in the creation of Telecom Australia (later Telstra) and Australia Post. In 1989, the Australian Postal Corporation Act established Australia Post as a self-funding entity, heralding a new direction in property management, including a move away from the larger more traditional buildings, towards smaller, shopfront-style post offices. With the advent of new digital technology requiring smaller spaces, Telstra (originally Telecom) also took a new direction in property management by withdrawing from larger telephone exchanges and former post offices, to smaller, more cost-efficient premises.

For much of its history, the post office has been responsible for a wide variety of community services including mail distribution, an agency for the Commonwealth Bank, electoral enrolments, and the provision of telegraph and telephone services. The town post office has served as a focal point for the community, most often built in a prominent position in the centre of town, close to other public buildings, creating a nucleus of civic buildings and community pride. Over the last 150 years, telecommunications has played a central role in developing lines of communication within Australia, has been important in eliminating Australia's isolation from the rest of the world, and has therefore played a major role in the development of the local, regional and national economies.

=== Wollongong East Post Office ===
Wollongong's first government post office was constructed in c. 1864 in Market Street, formalising the postal service that had been operating in Wollongong since 1832 when the first postmaster began working in the town. Early offices were commonly operated out of the business premises of the postmaster, the post being a part-time occupation for most early country postmasters. The building was an extension of the then telegraph office. The telegraph had arrived in Wollongong in 1862 and an office had been built in Market Street on land purchased by the Government to accommodate the telegraph office. Following the amalgamation of the post and telegraph departments in 1870, it was decided to combine both facilities in the same building. So it was then, in the mid-1870s, that the telegraph building was extended to house the post office as well. In 1882 the Market Street office was effectively rebuilt, with the addition of a new facade and a second storey.

In December 1888, the local MP, Francis Woodward (Illawarra), suggested to the Postmaster General that the existing building be sold and a new office be built in a more central position. The Postal Inspector agreed to the proposal valuing the current building at £2,000 and estimated a cost of £3,300 for the purchase of a suitable site and the erection of a new office in Wollongong. The site chosen was adjacent to the Wollongong Town Hall in Crown Street, which was purchased for £900 in October 1889 after protracted negotiation with a reluctant Public Instruction Department as the vendor.

Tenders for the construction of the new office were called; the lowest, from Messrs Banks and Whitehouse, for £2,953, was accepted. The Colonial Architect James Barnet finalised plans in 1890 and work on the construction began soon after. The two-storey office building was completed on 28 October 1892 under the reign of Government Architect Walter Liberty Vernon. The ground floor area included a covered entrance vestibule leading to the postal office, money order office and telegraph office. Behind the main office area was the battery room. A dining room, kitchen, scullery and laundry occupied the right wing of the building. On the first floor was the main living area for the postmaster, with five bedrooms, a drawing room and bathroom.

One of the functions of the post office was timekeeping. Each day, a telegraph signal was sent from Sydney to the post office and a metal disc located on the roof over the centre of the front facade was lowered in response. The lowering of the disc was observed from Flagstaff Hill and the one o'clock cannon would be fired. The disc mechanism has since been removed and there is a flagstaff in its place.

In 1914, the left wing of the building was extended to make way for the inclusion of a new telephone exchange, which involved the relocation of the battery room. In the front of the building, the rooms were reconfigured with a new public area in the former money order office, and a mailroom replaced the telegraph office on the eastern side. In 1918, more work was done on the front portion of the office. The public entrance was moved forward eliminating the vestibule area. Inside, the general office space was rearranged to accommodate a longer counter parallel to the front of the office. One internal wall was removed to create a large general office area and public space. The mailroom was moved to the public area from the 1914 design. An awning was installed at the front of the building at the same time.

In c. 1940, an annexe was built adjoining the post office to house new public telephones. In 1968, a new building was erected in Upper Crown Street to serve as Wollongong's main post office; the study site was re-classified as Wollongong East Post Office.

In 1988, Australia Post spent $250,000 restoring the Wollongong East Post Office. The project included the removal of the 1918 awning, which was replaced by a smaller canopy over the front entrance. Internally, the counter was moved back to allow for more public space, while an extra 300 private mail boxes brought the total to 800 for the office. The Post Office continued to operate until October 2000, when it was closed as an office, and was replaced by a shopfront office within the IBM Arcade off the Mall.

The building now houses a cafe and office space for various businesses.

== Description ==
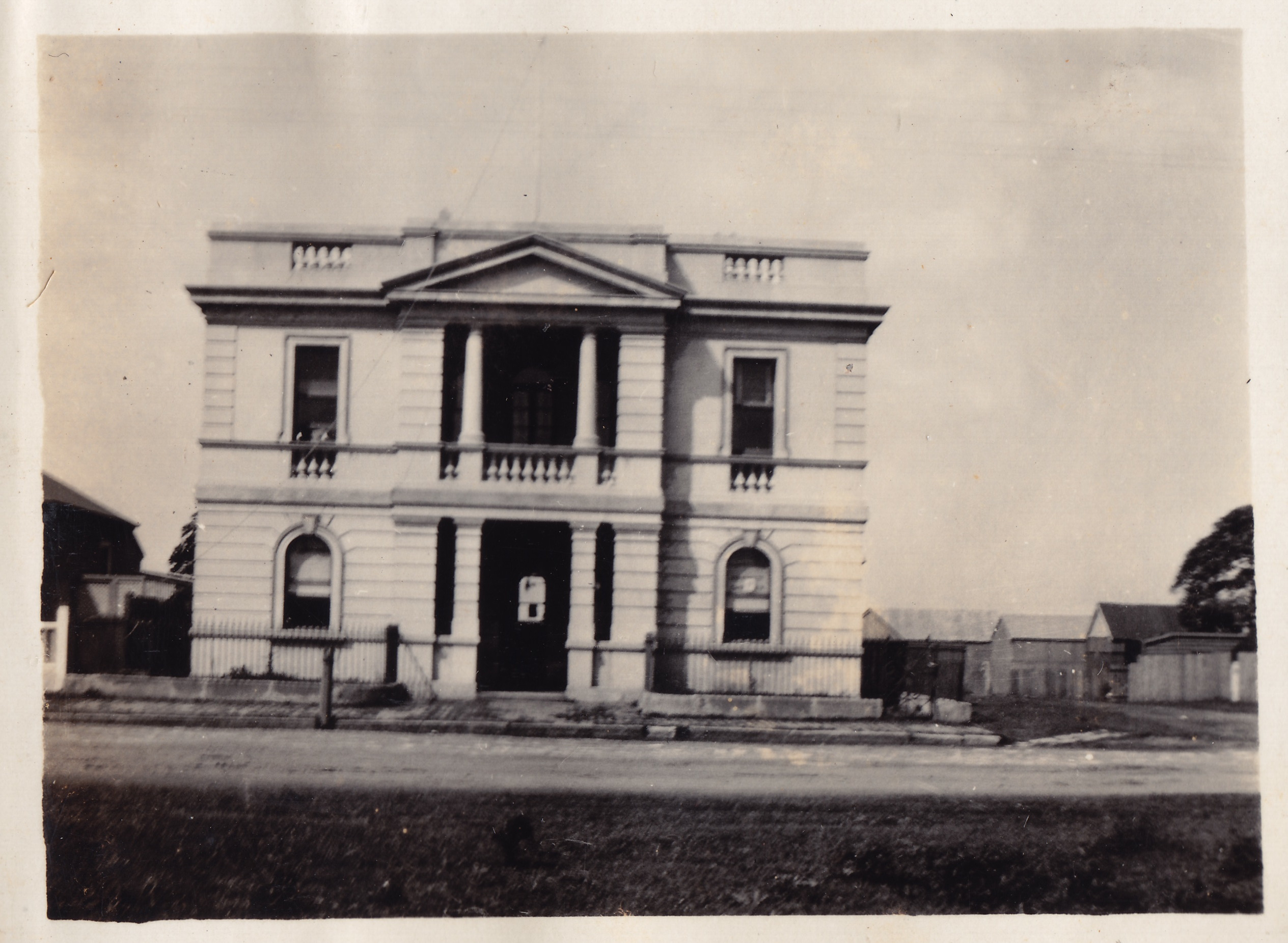
Undated photo of former Wollongong East Post Office

Wollongong East Post Office is a landmark building within the Crown Street streetscape, located close to the shopping mall. Completed in 1892, it is a two-storey, Victorian Free Classical building constructed in ashlar-rendered masonry with a smooth rendered base.

The first floor is surmounted by a hipped, tiled roof with a moulded parapet to the front elevation. The ground floor wings and extensions have been clad in gabled and skillion corrugated Colorbond sheets which, for the most part, are concealed behind rendered parapets. Four rendered and moulded chimneys punctuate the first floor roofline.

The facade is generally symmetrical about a central, recessed section of the building, which comprises the first floor balcony with a masonry balustrade, pillars and coat of arms at the centre, over the now enclosed front entry vestibule. A recent, unsympathetic steel and glass awning has been installed over the front entry.

The facade has simply moulded and fluted, square pilasters separating the ground and first floor, and triple, timber sash windows located either side of the central recessed section. The first floor pilasters have more elaborately moulded capitals. There are moulded string courses above the base, at first floor level and at the first floor balustrade level, with a bracketed, moulded cornice below the parapet. The parapet steps up to a decorative pediment feature, centred over the windows, one on either side of the building. The current colour scheme for the exterior of the building is an ochre base, beige body and taupe detailing.

The building has been substantially modified, particularly at ground floor level, since first constructed. The rear centre of the building, which was originally U-shaped and had a ground floor verandah servicing the western wing, has been enclosed to form the current mailroom. The eastern wing has been extended to the south for telephone exchange operations, the western masonry extension forming a new entry to the building and access to post boxes has been added, a weatherboard addition has been constructed on the western side and substantial interior fabric modifications have been undertaken. These include wall removal to both the ground and first floors and the installation of post boxes at the ground floor.

The main public entry is at the centre of the front facade, with another entry from within the western extension. The front steps to the entry are concrete and the floors to the extension have been clad in modern red clay tiles.

The interior of the ground floor of the Wollongong East Post Office comprises three main areas. These include the carpeted retail area and offices in the northern half of the building, the sheet-vinyl-floored mailroom, sorting room and post boxes areas at the centre rear and west side of the building, and staff facilities along the eastern side. There is modern tiling in the male and female bathrooms and cleaner's room.

The ceilings to the ground floor comprise smooth plaster with a deep, moulded cornice, with exposed beams between columns and masonry walls of the retail area and mailroom. There is a square set plaster ceiling to the postal manager's office, a lower plasterboard ceiling to the windowless room south of the office with a simple coved cornice, and asbestos-cement sheet to the kitchenette area and rear staff facilities with simple timber strip cornices.

Lighting throughout the ground floor is generally suspended fluorescent tubing from the modern Australia Post fitout. There is also a network of exposed air-conditioning ducting throughout the building, vents primarily inserted into ceilings and through fanlights. There are ceiling fans located in the retail area as well as the room behind the postal manager's office.

Architraves appear to be original and are generally intact excepting those to the three windows on the western side of the main entry doors, which have been damaged through later fitouts. There is modern trim to later openings. Some sections of original skirting have been retained, with the remainder replaced with wide timber board painted to match.

Windows to the retail area and some windows to the rear of the building appear original, timber sash windows. It appears that some of the glazing has been replaced. The front has a pair of timber French doors either side of a fixed centre door panel, the glazing has been painted over. They appear original to the 1918 enclosure of the front vestibule. Internal doors are generally later particularly to the staff facilities at the rear. There are fanlights above the postal manager's office door and above the door to the stairwell. Air-conditioning ducting has penetrated both fanlights.

Walls for the ground floor are generally rendered masonry, the mailroom walls have ashlar cut render to the majority of the surfaces and there is evidence of substantial patching indicating the enclosure of this area from a former exterior space. The later southern wall has been roughly rendered. Walls to the retail area are smooth rendered and there is evidence of previous patching. There are recent partition walls from fitouts in the retail area and between the retail and mailroom areas. These have been damaged through incomplete removal. In the space between the stairwell and the office there are two blind, shallow-arched recesses that have been obscured by a partition wall. The ground floor colour scheme includes cream- coloured walls with brown trim. Two chimney breasts have been retained, one is intact with a marble surround and a cast iron grate, located in the postal manager's office, the other is in the retail area and is covered over.

The original stairwell is located on the western side of the building at the centre. The stair comprises stained and varnished, turned timber posts and balusters, with a shaped rail, simply carved end brackets and sheet vinyl treads with metal strip edging.

The original first floor residence of the Wollongong East Post Office comprises seven rooms off a central corridor, which runs east to west along the southern wall of the building. The northwestern corner room, centre room and southeastern corner room are carpeted. The remainder of this level is lined with linoleum sheet. The balcony floor is in good condition, lined with well sealed, lapped bituminous felt.

Ceilings to the first floor are predominantly plaster with an elaborately moulded cornice around the stairwell, along the corridor and in the centre room (the former drawing room). There are square set plaster ceilings that appear recently altered in the southwestern corner room, northwestern corner room, southeastern corner room and the northeastern corner room. Ceilings to the toilet and adjacent storeroom on the eastern side (former linen room and bathroom respectively) are painted mini-orb corrugated iron.

All lighting on the top floor is modern suspended fluorescent tubing in various forms with some attached pendent lights in the corridor and above the stairwell. There are no ceiling fans to the upper floor but there are air-conditioning vents installed into the ceilings of each room, excluding the southwestern corner room, the bathroom and storage room with the mini-orb ceiling.

Architraves on this level appear intact and original to windows and doors, with minor damage evident from electrical work. There are high, continuous picture rails in the northeastern corner room and the centre room, except where a partition wall has been installed within the large later opening made in the western wall of the centre room. There are no other picture rails to the first floor. Original, wide, moulded timber skirting is intact and original to this floor, excepting the plain, recent boarding painted to match the original in the northwestern corner room as for the ground floor.

Windows to the upper floor are original, squared timber sash, with single upper and lower panes. The timber and glass panelled French doors to the balcony also appear to be original. A former window or door to the balcony, in the northern wall of the centre room, has been substantially modified with the insertion of an intrusive air-conditioning unit. Internal doors have high, square fanlights above. With their fanlights, the internal doors are nearly the full height of the wall.

Walls of the first floor are generally painted, rendered masonry, painted in a cream and brown colour scheme. Original walls have been removed from the centre of the northwestern corner room and between it and the centre room. A recent, timber-laminate partition wall has been inserted between the centre and northwestern corner rooms. Four chimney breasts have been retained on the first floor level. Two have been covered over, whereas the fireplaces remain relatively intact in the northeastern and southwestern corner rooms. There is a marble surround and cast-iron grate in the northeastern corner room and a timber surround in the southwestern corner room.

All signage referring to the former use as a post office has been removed, excepting the masonry coat of arms of the centre of the first floor balcony.

The surrounding streetscape comprises predominantly two to multi-storey retail and commercial buildings, primarily twentieth-century, but with some late nineteenth-century buildings. The Post Office is immediately adjacent to a two-storey Victorian commercial terrace building to the east, and the open courtyard of the three-storey Visitors Centre to the west, with a two-storey commercial building to the southwest.

The concrete rear yard of the post office currently serves as car parking, enclosed by a recent steel picket fence and double gate. There are some mature, deciduous street trees in front of the post office within the paved footpaths.

=== Condition ===
The building was reported to be generally in good condition as at 12 October 2001, with the exception of peeling paint in the interior of both floors and rotting timbers in the rear weatherboard addition.

The exterior form of the Wollongong East Post Office is largely intact, with modifications to the rear and western side. The interior has undergone extensive change, which has been concentrated largely on the ground floor with the introduction of larger public areas, mailroom and post box facilities and the enclosure of the front vestibule.

The first floor level has also undergone some changes, but a greater extent of original fabric and layout remain. Wollongong East Post Office retains the features which make it culturally significant, which includes the overall fabric, style, form and scale of the building.

The building is overall in fair to good condition, with some ceiling and wall cracking evident on the ground floor and first floor levels, some minor water damage and paint peeling. There is some evidence of previous patching.

=== Modifications and dates ===
Plans for the post office building were finalised in 1890 by the Colonial Architect's Office under James Barnet. The two-storey building was completed on 28 October 1892, and comprised offices, telegraph office, public space, battery room, dining room, kitchen, scullery and larder for the residence on the ground floor. The first floor comprised the postmaster's residence, with five bedrooms, drawing room, bathroom, linen room and balcony.

Excluding the original construction period of the building, there have been four main phases of alterations and additions to Wollongong East Post Office. They are outlined as follows:

- In 1914, plans indicate that the eastern wing of the building was extended with a hipped roof to the south to incorporate a new telephone exchange system, comprising an exchange room, attendants room, mechanics room and the relocated battery room. The front half of the ground floor was also reconfigured at this time.
- During 1918, more work was undertaken at the front of the building. Plans indicate that this included: the enclosure of the front vestibule; relocation of the mailroom to the western side of the building; relocation of the public space to the eastern side; front of the building; and construction of an awning to the front facade.
- In c. 1940s the rendered masonry annexe was constructed on the western side of the building to house new public telephones, later providing access to the post boxes located on this side. The construction of the southwestern corner skillion-roofed weatherboard addition (former verandah), the removal of part of the original western rear wing, enclosure of the U-shaped open rear of the building and the removal of the ground floor verandah probably occurred some time after.
- In 1988, Australia Post restored and refurbished the building by removing the 1918 awning and replacing it with a smaller, unsympathetic steel and glass canopy over the front entrance. 300 additional post boxes were installed at the post office during this time on the western side which were accessed via the c. 1940s western corridor addition.

The building was renamed Wollongong East Post Office in 1968, when the new building was constructed on another site.

The post office ceased operations in October 2000, when it was moved to the IBM Arcade, off the Mall.

== Heritage listing ==
Wollongong East Post Office is significant at State level for its historical associations, aesthetic qualities and social meaning.

Linked with the postal service that has been operating in Wollongong since 1832, Wollongong East Post Office has been the centre of communications for the local community for over a century and reflects the needs of a growing population towards the end of the nineteenth century. The post office also provides an insight into the development of communication services in NSW.

One of the last post offices that would have been designed by the Colonial Architect's Office in 1890 under James Barnet, it is a notable example of the Victorian Free Classical style and a prominent civic building in the Crown Street streetscape. Barnet was a key practitioner of the Victorian Free Classical style and was the designer of a large number of post offices across NSW between 1865 and 1890, a group which Wollongong East Post Office is part.

Wollongong East Post Office is also considered to be significant to the local community's sense of place.

Wollongong East Post Office was listed on the New South Wales State Heritage Register on 24 January 2003 having satisfied the following criteria.

The place is important in demonstrating the course, or pattern, of cultural or natural history in New South Wales.

Wollongong East Post Office has historical significance for its role in the provision and development of postal, telegraph and telephone services throughout the State.

Wollongong East Post Office is associated with the early development of Wollongong as it is linked with the postal service that has been operating in Wollongong since 1832.

Wollongong East Post Office reflects the population growth of the area towards the end of the nineteenth century, which resulted in the need for an improved level of services to the local residents and the construction of the new building in Crown Street to replace the c. 1876 Market Street property. It has been the centre of communications for the local community for over a century.

The place has a strong or special association with a person, or group of persons, of importance of cultural or natural history of New South Wales's history.

The building appears to have been one of the last post offices designed by the Colonial Architect's Office in 1890 under James Barnet, and completed under the reign of Government Architect Walter Liberty Vernon.

Wollongong East Post Office was designed by Colonial Architect James Barnet, a key practitioner of the Victorian Free Classical style of architecture. The Colonial Architect's Office under Barnet designed and maintained a large number of post offices across NSW between 1865 and 1890.

The place is important in demonstrating aesthetic characteristics and/or a high degree of creative or technical achievement in New South Wales.

Wollongong East Post Office is aesthetically significant because it is a notable example of the Victorian Free Classical style, and makes an important aesthetic contribution to central Wollongong East as a dominant nineteenth century public building.

It compares in style and form with Orange Post Office (1879) and Paddington Post Office (1885) post offices, although Wollongong East Post Office is smaller in scale.

The scale, architectural style and location of the building make it a focal point within the Crown Street streetscape, endowing it with landmark qualities. The adjacent Victorian commercial terrace is architecturally sympathetic to the post office, and together, add substantially to the character of streetscape.

The place has a strong or special association with a particular community or cultural group in New South Wales for social, cultural or spiritual reasons.

Wollongong East Post Office is a prominent civic building and a local landmark, and has been the centre of communications for the area for over a century. As such, it is considered to be important to the Wollongong community's sense of place.

The place has potential to yield information that will contribute to an understanding of the cultural or natural history of New South Wales.

The site may have some potential to contain archaeological information relating to the previous use of the site and the evolution of the building. However, there was insufficient evidence available to establish the degree of archaeological potential for the site.

The place possesses uncommon, rare or endangered aspects of the cultural or natural history of New South Wales.

Although not particularly rare in itself, Wollongong East Post Office is one of a small group of Victorian Free Classical style Post Offices.

The place is important in demonstrating the principal characteristics of a class of cultural or natural places/environments in New South Wales.

Wollongong East Post Office is part of the group of purpose-designed, nineteenth-century post offices in NSW, designed by the Colonial Architect's Office under James Barnet and although small in scale to comparable post offices, is a fine example of its type.

== See also ==
- List of post office buildings in New South Wales
- Old Wollongong Telegraph and Post Office which is located at 11 Market Street, Wollongong.
