= Wollongong Advertiser =

Regional newspaper in New South Wales

The Advertiser (incorporating Lake Times)
- Type: Weekly newspaper
- Owner: Australian Community Media
- Founded: February 1982 (43 years ago)
- Language: English
- City: Wollongong, New South Wales
- Country: Australia
- Sister newspapers: Illawarra Mercury
- Website: advertiserlaketimes.com.au

The Wollongong Advertiser is a free community newspaper published by Australian Community Media for the residents of the Wollongong and Shellharbour Local Government Areas in New South Wales, Australia.

== History ==
The Advertiser began in February 1982 as the Wollongong-Shellharbour Advertiser. Until 2012, the newspaper was published in three editions: Wollongong Advertiser, Shellharbour Advertiser and Kiama Advertiser. Fairfax Media purchased the Kiama Independent in 2011 and the Lake Times in 2012.

In 2015, the Wollongong Advertiser and the Lake Times were merged by Fairfax Media to become The Advertiser & Lake Times.
