= Cadia =

Cadia may refer to:

- CADIA, the Center for Analysis and Design of Intelligent Agents. A research centre at Reykjavík University.
- Cadia, New South Wales, a locality and former private township in Australia; the surrounding area is known as the Cadia Valley.
- Cadia (plant), a genus of legumes
- Cadia (band), Christian girl band
- Cadia (Warhammer 40,000), a fictional planet in the Warhammer 40,000 universe

See also:

- Cadia-Ridgeway Mine, gold/copper mine in Australia
- Cadia Engine House, a heritage listed engine house at Cadia, New South Wales
- Cadia Mine railway line, a now dismantled railway line that once ran to Cadia, New South Wales.
