= Australian Iron & Steel =

- Founded: 1928
- Founder: Hoskins Iron & Steel; Dorman Long; Howard Smith; Baldwins
- Headquarters: Port Kembla, New South Wales, Australia
- Parent: BHP

Australian Iron & Steel was an Australian iron and steel manufacturer.

== History ==
=== Public company (1928-1935) ===
Australian Iron & Steel (AI&S) was established in 1928 to take over the business of Hoskins Iron & Steel. That company had already commenced the work to replace its two blast furnaces at Lithgow with a new one at Port Kembla. However, it needed more funding to relocate its steelmaking and rolling operations to the coast at Port Kembla.

The ordinary shares in the new company were held by the former shareholders of Hoskins Iron and Steel (the Hoskins family), Dorman Long and Baldwins Ltd (two British companies) and Howard Smith Limited (an Australian coal and shipping company). There were also preference shareholders, who received preference shares paying 7.5%.

Only Howard Smith and the preference shareholders paid cash for their shares. Hoskins and Dorman Long received their shares in exchange for assets that they contributed to the new company. Baldwins received their shares as a part payment for disused rolling mill equipment to be removed from their Margam works and reinstalled at Port Kembla. Howard Smith also became the shipping agent for the new company.

As previous owners of Hoskins Iron and Steel, the Hoskins family was the largest (but not the majority) shareholder in the new company. Cecil Hoskins became chairman of the new company and his brother Arthur Sidney (Sid) Hoskins also joined the board.

The company made an issue of new ordinary shares in 1929. It also made investments in two partially owned subsidiary companies, Southern Portland Cement Ltd. and Southern Blue Metal Quarries.

By 1932, the plant at Port Kembla was making, bars, iron pipes, rails and plate. Planned expansions—a sheet mill, galvanising plant, and modifications to its bar mill—were accommodated within the overall master plan for the site. However, the new plant was beset with difficulties that, ultimately, would prove too great for AI&S to resolve, and lead to the company merging with Broken Hill Proprietary Co. Limited in 1935.

=== Subsidiary company (after 1935) ===
==== Merger with BHP ====
In October 1935, all the ordinary shares in AI&S were acquired by BHP, in an exchange for 750,000 BHP ordinary shares, and AI&S became a wholly owned subsidiary company of BHP. The merger did not include preference shares in AI&S.

==== After the merger with BHP ====
The board of AI&S was altered to reflect the new ownership of the company, and Harold Darling became its chairman. It was this new board, who delivered the bad news, in March 1936 of AI&S's 33% fall in half-year profit, and in November 1936, of its half-year loss. AI&S preference shareholders, at least, received some of their deferred distributions, but the outlook for these investors still appeared shaky. In time it would improve, and the preference shares remained a problem for BHP, for many years, due to the high rate these shares paid.

Howard Smith Ltd retained the BHP ordinary shares it obtained in the merger and quickly benefitted as a result; it continued to be BHP's partner in Southern Portland Cement Ltd, until 1974.

The troublesome AI&S sheet mill was transferred to John Lysaght, in April 1936; it was expected to add about 20% to the 100,000 tons of galvanised sheet that Lysaght was already making at Newcastle each year. Within a relatively short time, John Lysaght had the mill working properly.

In the early years of the Port Kembla plant, during the worst of the Great Depression, there had been a relative absence of union activity and industrial disputes. The dismissal of a mill hand, Norman Annable, for refusing to work overtime on 24 January 1936, precipitated a strike. However, the issue was broader. The workers were seeking improved conditions as well. Soon, over 3000 men were on strike at Port Kembla. The strike would continue until the very end of March 1936.

By 1937, a global shortage of steel, encouraged BHP to raise more capital and to expand Port Kembla. A second modern merchant mill, second blast furnace and third steel furnace were added, then a billet mill. The expansions effectively doubled the pre-merger capacity of the works.

==== World War II ====
The expansion came just in time, as the Port Kembla steelworks became a critical industry for Australia during World War II. A shortage of shipping and the risk of enemy attack on shipping, led to the wartime reopening of the old Hoskins' ore quarry at Cadia and its branch railway—together with other ore quarries in New South Wales, including another Hoskins quarry at Breadalbane—to keep Port Kembla's two blast furnaces working. The Port Kembla plant produced weapons during the war, including parts for 25-pounder guns.

==== After World War II ====
Preference shares of AI&S remained trading on the stock exchange, until 1959 when BHP's offer was accepted and the AIS preference shares were converted to ordinary BHP shares.

Under its name, the subsidiary company, AI&S, operated the integrated steelworks at Port Kembla, New South Wales, (now BlueScope). It also operated a rolling mill (beginning in 1956) and a blast furnace (from 1968 to 1982), at Kwinana, in Western Australia. Originally planned to become another integrated iron and steel works by 1978, the Kwinana plant became a victim of a global overcapacity in steel.

== See also ==
- John Lysaght (Australia)
