= Cadia Engine House =

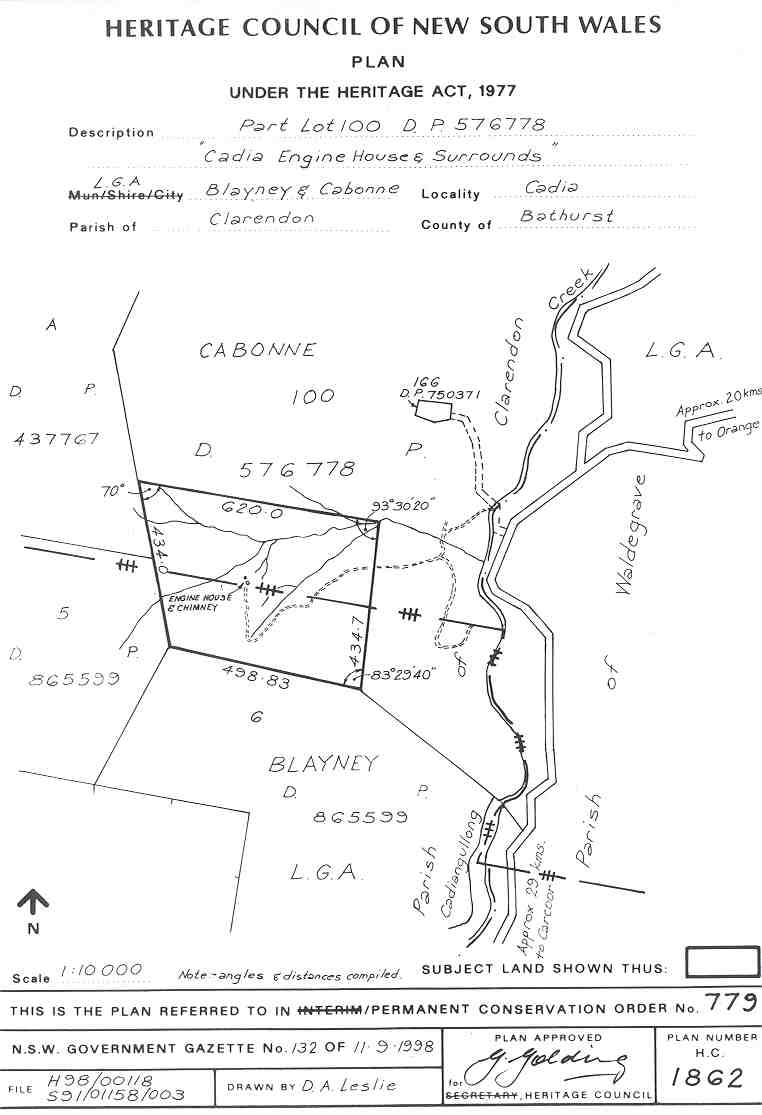
- Heritage boundaries

- Location within New South Wales Location within Australia
- 33.4496°S 148.9861°E
- Location: Cadia, Blayney Shire, New South Wales, Australia

History
- Built: 1865–1867

Site notes
- Owner: Newcrest

New South Wales Heritage Register
- Official name: Cadia Engine House & Surrounds; Cadia Valley Operations
- Type: state heritage (archaeological-terrestrial)
- Designated: 2 April 1999
- Reference no.: 779
- Type: Engine House/Room
- Category: Mining and Mineral Processing

Cadia Engine House is a heritage-listed engine house at Cadia, in the Central West region of New South Wales, Australia. It was built from 1865 to 1867. The property is owned by Newcrest, forming part of the company's Cadia-Ridgeway Mine lease. It was added to the New South Wales State Heritage Register on 2 April 1999.

== History ==
In 1865 a "Cornish type" copper mine engine house was established on the south-eastern slopes of Mt Canobolis near Orange in New South Wales.

The mine operated for a short time until it was abandoned as uneconomical in 1867.

Subsequently, much of the equipment was removed and the structures fell into ruin. Some of the machinery was salvaged for scrap in the 1920s.

In 1993 some stabilisation works were undertaken, including roofing over the engine house.

== Description ==
The Cadia Engine House consists of a rubble stone and brick chimney and stone engine house and crusher house in open country side.

The beam engine was used to raise ore, drive the pump, drive the crushing machine and power other machinery. The engine house of several storeys was built to house the beam engine. The crusher house was constructed of stone and possesses some timbering, but this building is in much poorer condition. The chimney is constructed of local stone for the first 15m; the top 5m are built of red brick. Abutting the base of the chimney is remnant walling of the boiler house. Extant machinery items include remains of the beam engine, drive and brake mechanisms, pump parts, and elements of the crushing machinery and the boiler.

A 1995 conservation management plan stated "Surface historical mining fabric related to all post 1880s phases is fragmented, partial and often ephemeral, but the precinct has high potential to contain significant archaeological deposits related to the lifestyle and technology of the former community and mining activity."

== Heritage listing ==
The Cadia Engine House, associated buildings and immediate surrounding mine infrastructure constitute a historic site of national significance. The high level of integrity of the surviving structural elements, and the physical evidence of the mine layout, combined with the presence of unique components of the engine and crushing machinery, as well the manufacturer's original drawing of the engine and engine house, make the site one of the most important of its kind in Australia.

Cadia Engine House was listed on the New South Wales State Heritage Register on 2 April 1999.
