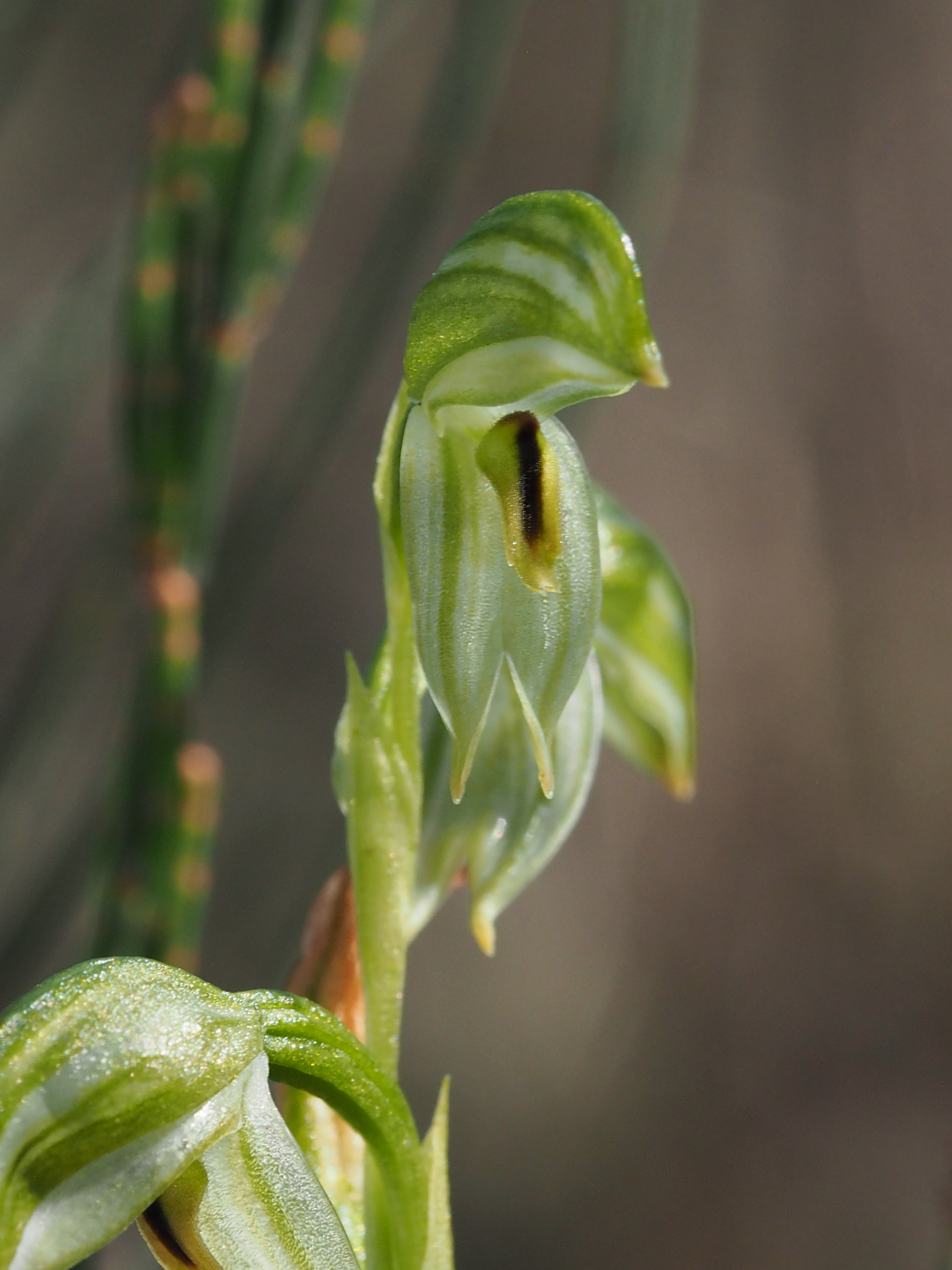
- In the Gibraltar Range National Park

Scientific classification
- Kingdom: Plantae
- Clade: Tracheophytes
- Clade: Angiosperms
- Clade: Monocots
- Order: Asparagales
- Family: Orchidaceae
- Subfamily: Orchidoideae
- Tribe: Cranichideae
- Genus: Pterostylis
- Species: P. tenuis

Binomial name
- Pterostylis tenuis (D.L.Jones) G.N.Backh.

Synonyms
- Bunochilus tenuis D.L.Jones

= Pterostylis tenuis =

Smooth leafy greenhood

Species of orchid

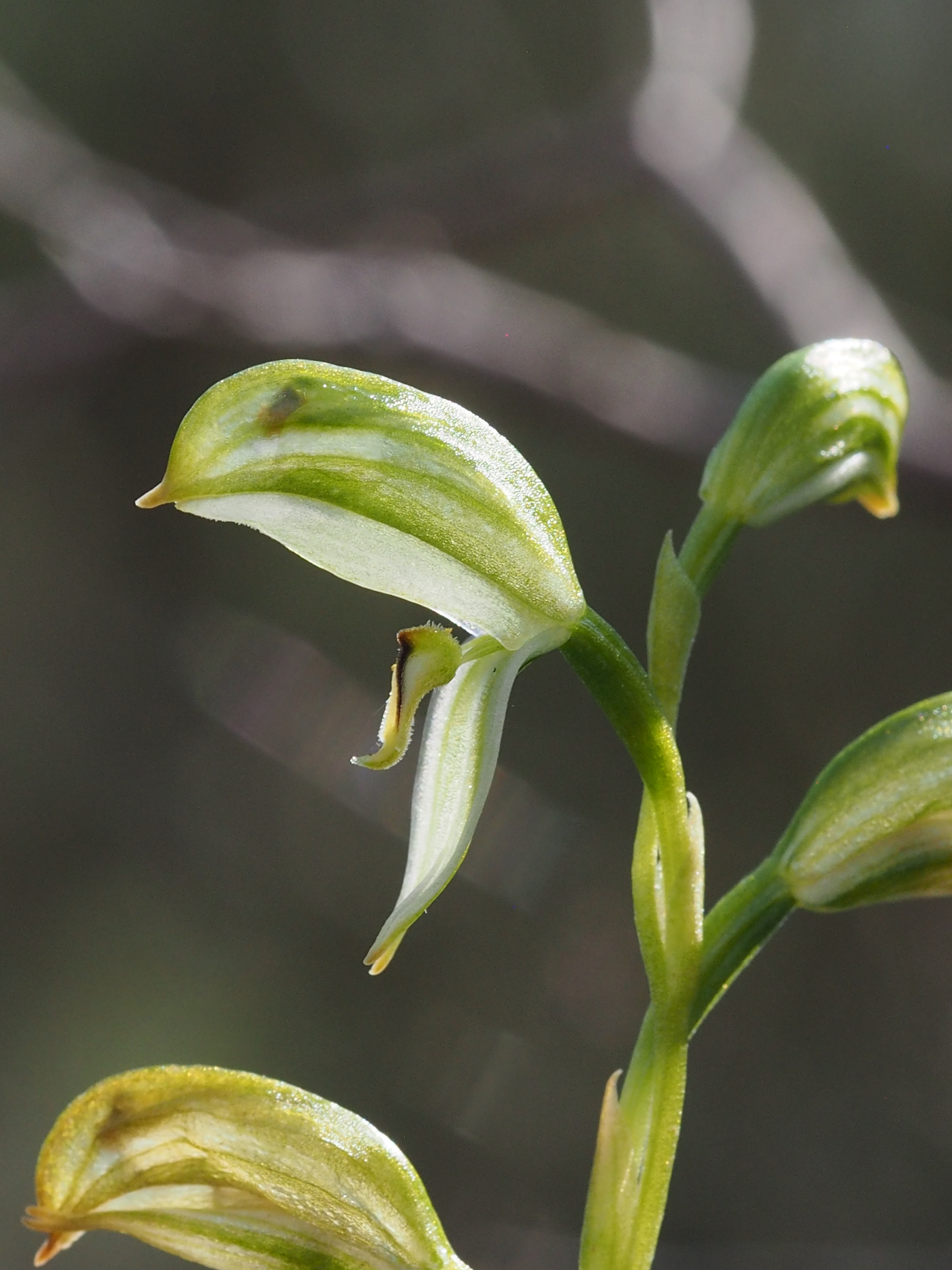
Side view of flower

Pterostylis tenuis commonly known as the smooth leafy greenhood is a plant in the orchid family Orchidaceae and is endemic to New South Wales. Non-flowering plants have a rosette of leaves on a short stalk. Flowering plants lack a rosette but have up to four shiny, translucent green flowers on a flowering stem with three to six stem leaves.

== Description ==
Pterostylis tenuis, is a terrestrial, perennial, deciduous, herb with an underground tuber. Non-flowering plants have a rosette of between three and seven leaves, each leaf 10–35 mm (0.4–1 in) long and 3–8 mm (0.1–0.3 in) wide on a stalk 30–60 mm (1–2 in) high. Flowering plants have up to four translucent dark green flowers with darker markings on a flowering spike 120–300 mm (5–10 in) high. The flowering spike has between three and six stem leaves which are 15–60 mm (0.6–2 in) long and 3–5 mm (0.1–0.2 in) wide. The flowers are 16–21 mm (0.6–0.8 in) long, 7–12 mm (0.3–0.5 in) wide. The dorsal sepal and petals are joined to form a hood over the column with the dorsal sepal having a brown or green tip. The lateral sepals turn downwards and are 14–18 mm (0.6–0.7 in) long, 9–12 mm (0.4–0.5 in) wide and joined to each other for more than half their length. The labellum is 6–8 mm (0.2–0.3 in) long, 2–3 mm (0.08–0.1 in) wide and light brown with a darker brown stripe along its mid-line. Flowering occurs in September and October.

== Taxonomy and naming ==
The smooth leafy greenhood was first formally described in 2006 by David Jones who gave it the name Bunochilus tenuis and published the description in Australian Orchid Research from a specimen collected in the Cadia Valley. In 2010, Gary Backhouse changed the name to Pterostylis tenuis. The specific epithet (tenuis) is a Latin word meaning "thin", referring to the narrow labellum of this species.

== Distribution and habitat ==
Pterostylis tenuis grows on slopes and ridges in dry forest between the Torrington and Bathurst areas and is more common in the southerly parts of its range.
