= Charles Hoskins =

Australian industrialist

Charles Henry Hoskins
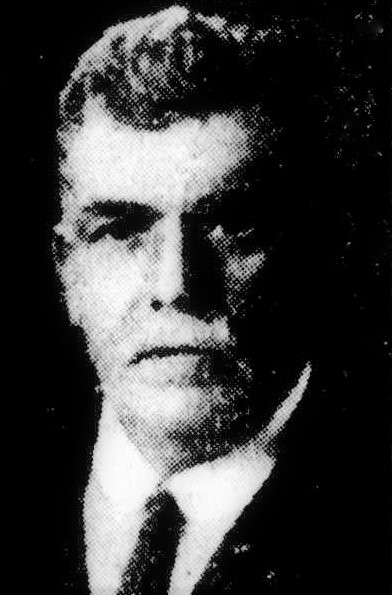
- Born: 26 March 1851; London, England
- Died: 14 February 1926 (aged 74); Elizabeth Bay, Australia
- Occupation: Industrialist
- Known for: Pioneer of modern iron and steel industry in Australia
- Spouse: Emily Willis
- Children: 8 (including son Cecil Hoskins)

Charles Henry Hoskins (1851-1926) was an Australian industrialist, who was significant in the development of the iron and steel industry in Australia.

== Early life ==
Charles Hoskins was born on 26 March 1851 in London, to John Hoskins, gunsmith, and his wife Wilmot Eliza, née Thompson. He emigrated with his family to Australia as a small child in 1853, and all his education occurred in Melbourne.

After his father's death, the family moved to Smythesdale, near Ballarat. Hoskins began work as a mail boy, tried his luck on the goldfields, and worked as an assistant in an ironmongery store in Bendigo.

== Sydney ==
Charles Hoskins joined his elder brother George (1847-1926) in Sydney in 1876, operating a small engineering workshop at Hay Street, Ultimo. Around 1889, their firm, G & C Hoskins, moved to larger premises in Wattle Street, Ultimo and established a foundry, pipe-works and boiler shop. This plant was expanded in 1902. It was pipe manufacturing that would lead to their success.

=== Innovation and success ===
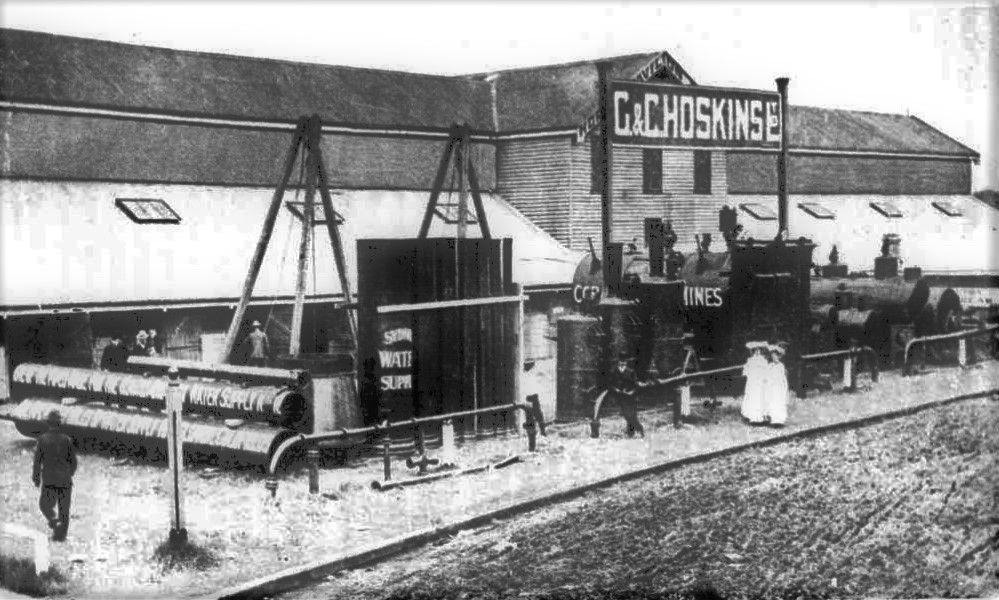
The exhibit of G & C Hoskins at the Agricultural Society Show of 1904.

A breakthrough came when they began to win contracts for the Sydney water supply mains. This was to provide a steady flow of work through their Ultimo factory for a number of years after 1892. In 1904, the other major pipe manufacturer in the Sydney market, Pope & Maher, failed; G & C Hoskins were left as the dominant supplier in that market. From 1911, they opened a second facility at Rhodes, to manufacture cast-iron pipes.

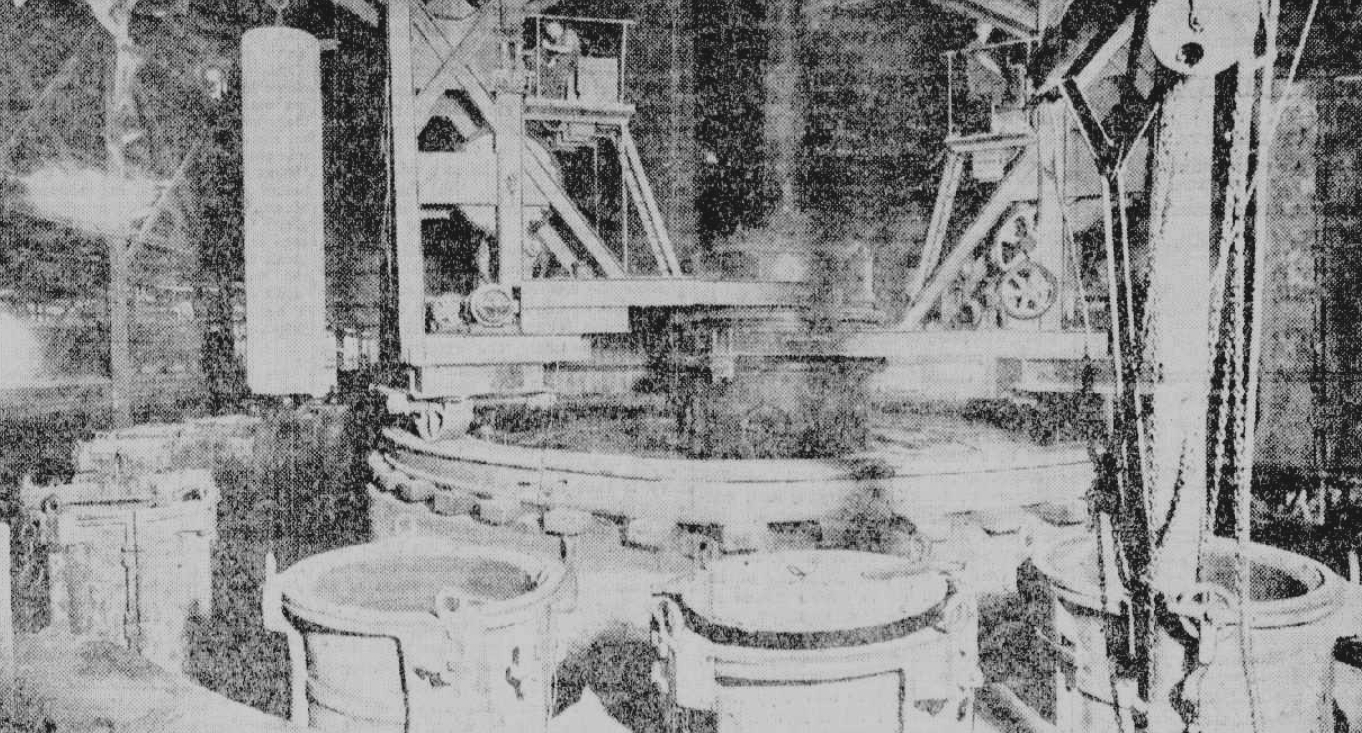
Equipment for casting 36-in iron pipes, Rhodes, c. 1914.

The Hoskins brothers were not only efficient; they were also innovative, patenting a number of their ideas for improving pipes and their manufacturing processes.

=== Free trade and industry protection ===
The issue of protection against imports was the principal political division of late 19th-century Australia. In New South Wales, almost alone of the Australian colonies, there was widespread support for free trade. A growing force was the Labor Party; it somewhat favoured protection, as a means to maintain relatively high wages, but also advocated nationalisation of major industries, complicating its position.

Politically, Hoskins was for Federation, free trade between the Australian colonies, and uniform tariff protection against imports from other countries. The Chamber of Manufacturers of New South Wales had been established in 1885—Hoskins was an early and prominent member—with its primary supporters focusing on lobbying for protection, in direct opposition to the "Free Traders" led by Sir Henry Parkes and later George Reid. This oppositional approach made little progress, with Free Trade governments holding power in New South Wales, except between 1891 and 1895. In 1895, Charles Hoskins was the first president of a reconstituted Chamber of Manufacturers that aimed to advance industry, without partisan political lobbying, an approach that it has followed since that time.

Free Traders were not opposed to a local iron and steel industry; their view was that it could come about, without a protective tariff. The Government of New South Wales had offered a large contract for locally made steel rails. A leading Free Trade businessman and politician, Joseph Mitchell won the contract, in 1897, but died before he could build his planned large iron and steel works near Wallerawang. G & C Hoskins also tendered, unsuccessfully. It was an early sign of an interest in entering the iron and steel industry. However, in 1899, when William Sandford attempted to interest Charles Hoskins in buying the Eskbank works at Lithgow, the offer was declined.

Charles Hoskins was a Protectionist but also—through lack of other options—a major user of imported iron and steel. After his friend and fellow protectionist, William Sandford, commenced production of pig iron at Lithgow, in May 1907, G & C Hoskins became one of Sandford's major customers.

== Interstate expansion ==
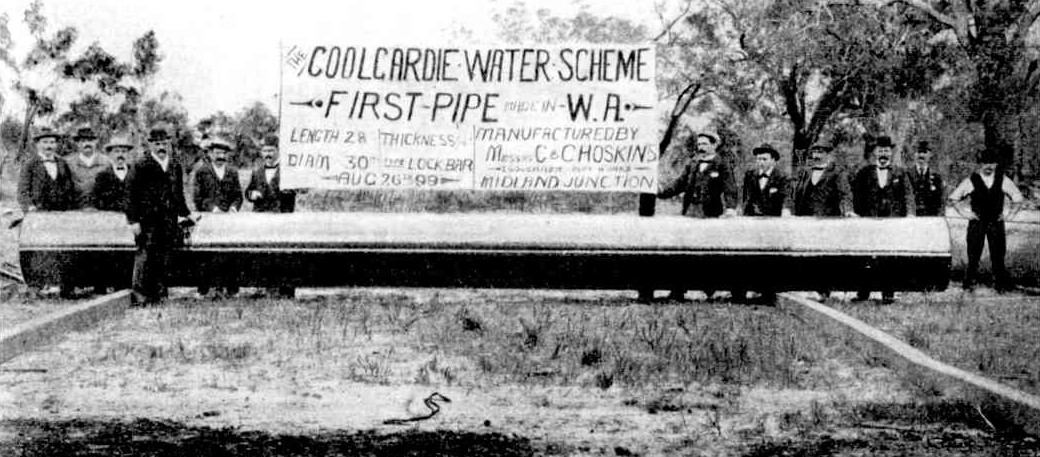
First pipe manufactured by G & C Hoskins in Western Australia for the Coolgardie Water Supply Scheme. The man standing in front of the pipe on the left is Charles Hoskins.

In the 1890s, G & C Hoskins opened a branch in Melbourne to make steel pipes.

In 1898, after negotiations, G & C Hoskins and the Melbourne firm Mephan Ferguson shared the contract to manufacture and lay 60,000 lengths of pipe over the 350 miles (563 km) from Perth to Coolgardie, for the water-supply scheme designed by Charles Yelverton O'Connor. This allowed the Hoskins' firm to further increase its technical capabilities in pipe manufacturing, as a result of the collaboration with the leading Melbourne firm and the purchase of their patent rights for New South Wales. G & C Hoskins' share of the contract was worth around £500,000.

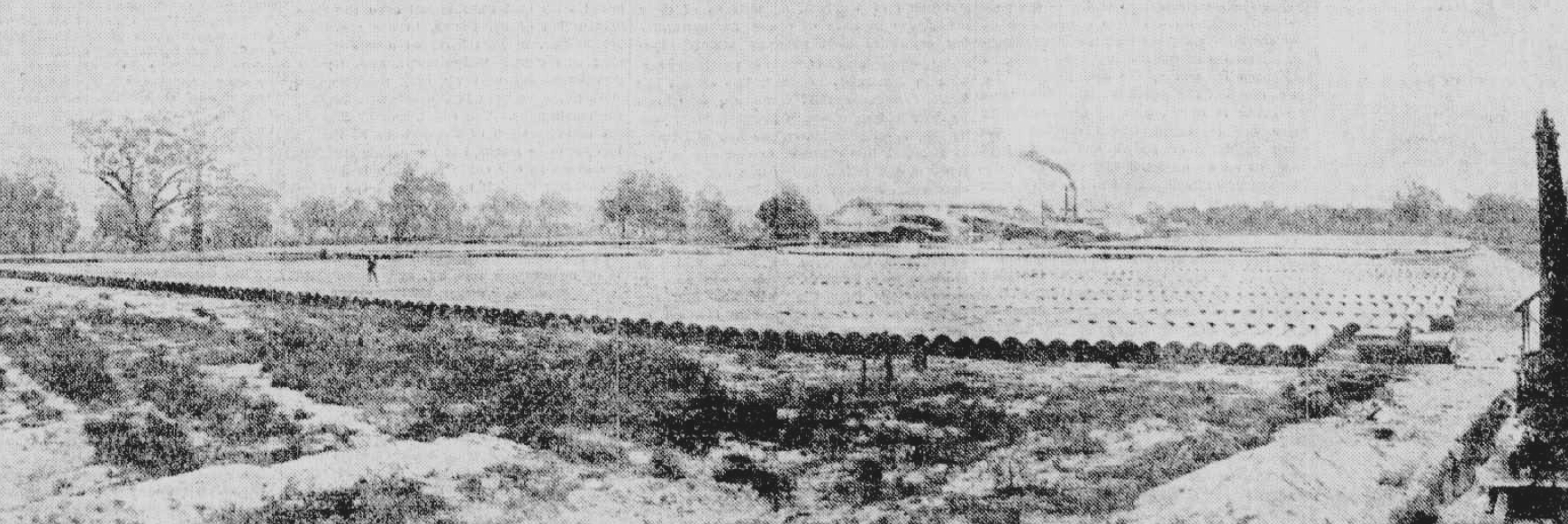
Hoskins' pipe factory, Midland Junction, WA, with 60 miles of pipes for Coolgardie Water Supply Scheme in foreground.

The contract for the pipeline in Western Australia stipulated that the pipes were to be manufactured in that state, and that all would be to Mephan Ferguson's design using an ingenious 'rivetless' locking bar. The steel for the pipes for the Coolgardie Water Scheme was imported but the Hoskins' share of the pipes were fabricated at a factory that the Hoskins established at Midland Junction, which was reported to employ 200 workers. Ferguson made his share of the pipes at another factory in Perth, reported at the time as 'Falkirk', now Maylands.

After completion of the pipeline to the Goldfields, the Hoskins established a works, on a block lying between Wellington and Murray Streets in Perth, and won other work associated with the reticulation of water in Western Australia.

In November 1923, the company opened a steel pipe plant at South Brisbane.

== Lithgow ==
=== Failure of William Sandford Limited ===
In December 1907, there was a crisis when the Commercial Banking Company of Sydney took over the assets of William Sandford Limited, owners of the Eskbank Ironworks at Lithgow, including its nearly-new modern blast furnace. It was Charles Hoskins, one of William Sandford's closest friends, one of his largest customers, one of the few outside shareholders of William Sandford Limited, and a fellow protectionist, who stepped in to acquire the assets and keep the works operating.

=== Taking over from William Sandford ===
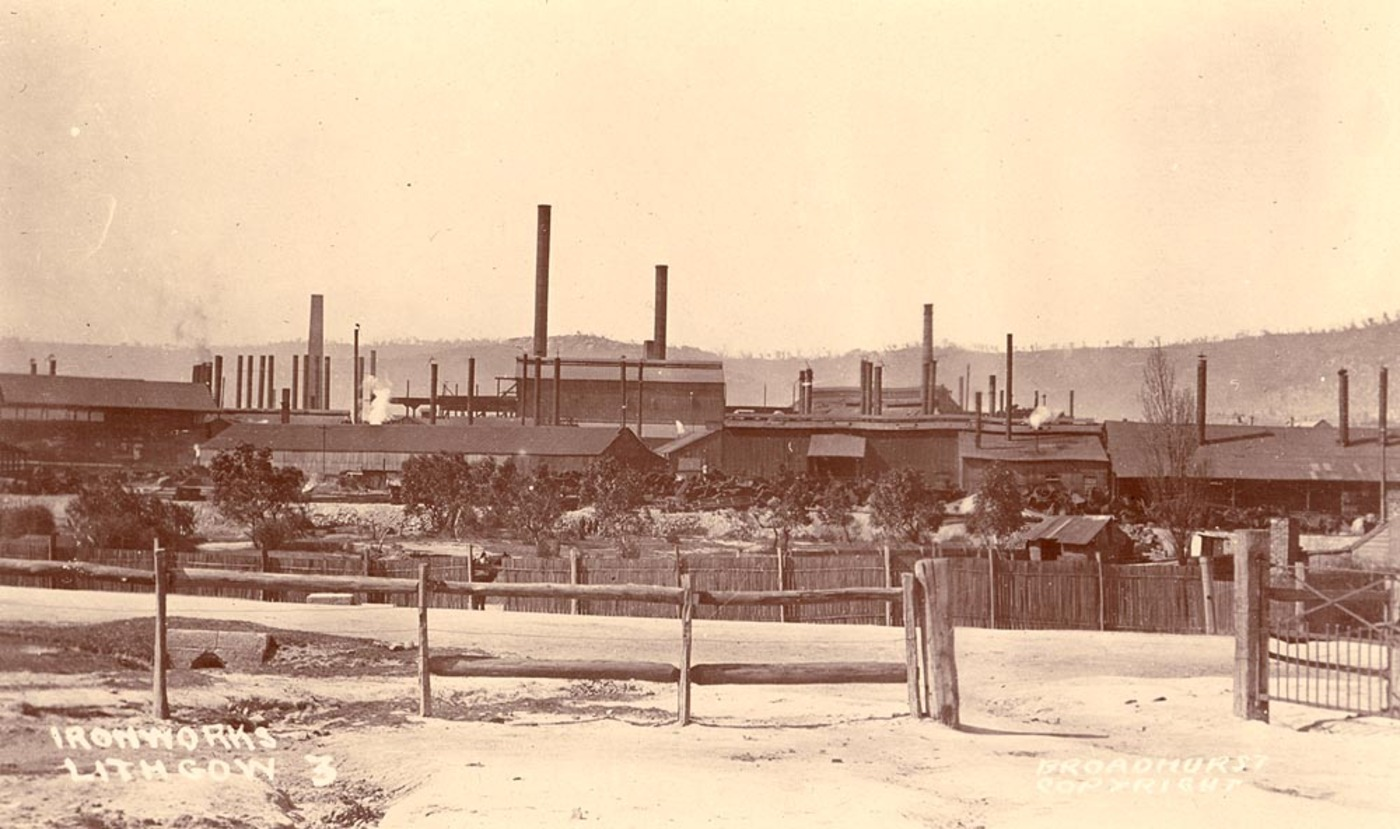
Ironworks, Lithgow; this part of the plant lay west from the site of the blast furnace. (Taken between 1900 and 1927

G & C Hoskins became the owners of the blast furnace, a colliery, coke ovens, steelmaking furnaces, rolling mills, an iron ore mine at Coombing Park near Carcoar, an iron ore lease near Cadia, and 400 acres of freehold land at Lithgow, as well as Sandford's house on his 2000-acre estate, 'Eskroy Park', near Bowenfels.

Charles Hoskins relocated to Lithgow, to manage the Eskbank works, assisted his two elder sons, Guildford and Cecil. Charles's elder brother George and George's three sons (George jnr, Leslie, and Harold) managed the pipe manufacturing business, which was about to undergo a large expansion involving the opening of a new pipe plant at Rhodes in 1911. By 1914, the combined output of the two pipe plants was over 50,000 tons of pipes and castings, per year, using pig iron from Lithgow as the raw material.

As for the management team of the Lithgow works, Sandford, his two sons, and their reliable and competent General Manager, William Thornley, were lost to the Hoskins, but most of the line management came over, which was crucial to the Hoskins' subsequent success.

William Sandford Limited had been a large enterprise employing over 700 workers. Although notionally a public company, it had been run more like the private company of the Sandford family, who held nearly all the company's shares. Sandford had managed the company in an idiosyncratic manner. Sandford had employed his workers under contracts, with different wage rates in different parts of the works.

Upon taking over, the businesslike Hoskins found the account books in a mess. The costs of production were difficult to identify and understand but turned out to be higher than expected. The Lithgow works had been making a loss, which became clear within a year after the take over.

=== Industrial strife and personal disputes ===
Charles Hoskins' views on industrial relations were very different to those of William Sandford. Hoskins had a more belligerent personality, not given to compromise. He was also under pressure to turn around a failing enterprise.

As Hoskins prepared to take over the works from Sandford, he made a generous gift to workers facing a bleak Christmas of 1907, following the shutdown of the works. Any initial goodwill did not last, when Hoskins attempted to move from contract arrangements to day labour wages, in 1908, and to lower the overall wage paid to his workers. He closed the works for five weeks in July 1908, ostensibly to perform repairs, but later was found guilty of deliberately engineering a lock out and fined.

Matters came to a climax at the end of August 1911, when during a bitter and sometimes violent company-wide strike—following Hoskins use of strikebreaking 'scab' labour in his coal mine to keep the works operating—Hoskins and his sons, Henry and Cecil, were besieged by rock-throwing workers and his motor car was destroyed by the rioters. The blast furnace was shut down briefly.

Perhaps as a result of the strain he was under, earlier in August 1911, Charles Hoskins had made some ungracious public remarks—about the previous owner, William Sandford, and his management of the Lithgow plant—resulting in a bitter public dispute between the two old friends. By then, both men felt that they had been deceived by the other; Sandford believed that Hoskins had connived in his downfall and besmirched his reputation and Hoskins believed that Sandford had not disclosed that the Lithgow works had been losing money. The two men also had very different views of their workforce; Hoskins had little of Sandford's paternalistic concern for his workers and was more concerned about profits.

The strike continued for another nine months—an uneasy industrial peace resulted from a compromise outcome in April 1912—but Hoskins did achieve a wage cut.

Lithgow and its coal and ore mines were never to be harmonious workplaces, once Hoskins took over; there were numerous disputes and strikes, right to the end. The same was true of the G & C Hoskins plants in Sydney.

=== Politics, royal commission and dispute with NSW Government ===
The contract with the NSW Government that Hoskins had inherited from William Sandford provided the underlying economic basis of the Lithgow plant. Hoskins own pipe plants consumed a portion Lithgow's iron, but not enough to justify its existence.

Nonetheless, by early 1909, Hoskins was already critical of the contractual arrangements with the NSW Government, his main customer. Hoskins was required to buy the scrap iron originating from the railways and other government entities. He contended that the contract prices for the scrap were significantly higher than he could pay for similar material in the open market. However, the threat to the exclusive contract would not come from the company, but from the NSW Government itself.

At the election of October 1910, the first Labor government of NSW came to power, led by James McGowen. It had been Labor and McGowan, who had triggered the final collapse of William Sandford Limited, in October 1907, when they joined forces with George Reid to insist that a critical government loan—intended to keep the cash-strapped company operating—take absolute precedence of security, over the company's existing commercial bank loans. At that time, Labor favoured a policy of nationalisation of heavy industry and was ambivalent concerning the future of companies such as G. & C. Hoskins. Labor, as the political wing of the organised labour movement, could not have been sympathetic to Hoskins' hard-nosed approach to industrial relations. McGowen's government's attitude to Hoskins and his Lithgow works would be very different to that of the previous premier, Charles Wade. Labor saw Hoskins as a supporter of Wade, and owed him no favours.

Hoskins had secured his first order for steel rails in May 1911. However, in the same year, the NSW Government set up a Royal Commission to "inquire as to the suitability of New South Wales ores for iron and steel manufacture, the cost of production from local ores, whether the Government's arrangements with Messrs. G. and C. Hoskins for supplies of iron and steel are beneficial to the Government, and the approximate cost of a plant capable of producing the iron and steel to be required in the future by the Commonwealth Government and the Governments of the different States."

The NSW Government, through the Attorney-General William Holman, appointed the manager of the Steel Company of Scotland, F.W. Paul, as the Royal Commissioner. His findings were highly critical of the existing arrangements, the quality of the products being supplied, that not all the steel supplied was made from Australian ores (some was German steel), and of Charles Hoskins himself. The last aspect of the findings was unsurprising, given Hoskins combative approach in giving his evidence and that he had clashed with the Royal Commissioner.

Hoskins' reaction was to assert that Royal Commission had been intended to justify nationalising the steel industry, which given its terms of reference is conceivable, but the Premier denied that. In late November 1911, as Hoskins was trying to resolve the lengthy industrial dispute at Lithgow, the NSW Government—citing the stipulation that all the material should be the product of Australian ore—cancelled all its contracts with G. & C. Hoskins; this would have doomed all the Lithgow plant, except the blast furnace, to closure. The company responded in late December 1911, by initiating legal action, against the NSW Government, stating that it was being "condemned unheard" in an unfair and unjust manner.

The company issued a writ in March 1912, and then filed its case in June 1912, claiming £150,000 in damages. In the meantime, other events were favourable to Hoskins; the industrial dispute ended in an uneasy peace, in April 1912, and, later in 1912, the company won a contract to supply rails and fishplates for the new Trans-Australian Railway—after convincing the Commonwealth authorities that it could meet the product specification—and a large order of water pipes for the new national capital. The hearing of Hoskins' case was postponed until 1913. As time passed, pending the court hearing, the inadequacies of the plant at Lithgow—ultimately the root cause of the NSW Government's dissatisfaction—were being rectified, as Hoskins rapidly expanded the plant and increased its both its capacity and capability.

By April 1913, the parties had reached an agreement, and the matter did not proceed to trial. Under the settlement, the original exclusive contract was not reinstated, but the company was not debarred from tendering to the N.S.W Government, which it did successfully in subsequent years. Labor still held office, when, in June 1913, McGowen was replaced as premier by his deputy, the same William Holman, who had been the Attorney-General and the driving force behind the Royal Commission. The new premier continued to justify the cancellation of the contract, based on the Royal Commissioner's findings but the government was by then faced with the adverse consequences for the workers of Lithgow—now that the industrial disputes were over.

The company's relations with the NSW Government seem to have improved by 1915; the company won a tender for rails, and the price paid was significantly lower than previous prices for imported rails. For a time, there was active consideration of the NSW Government purchasing the works, but it came to nothing.

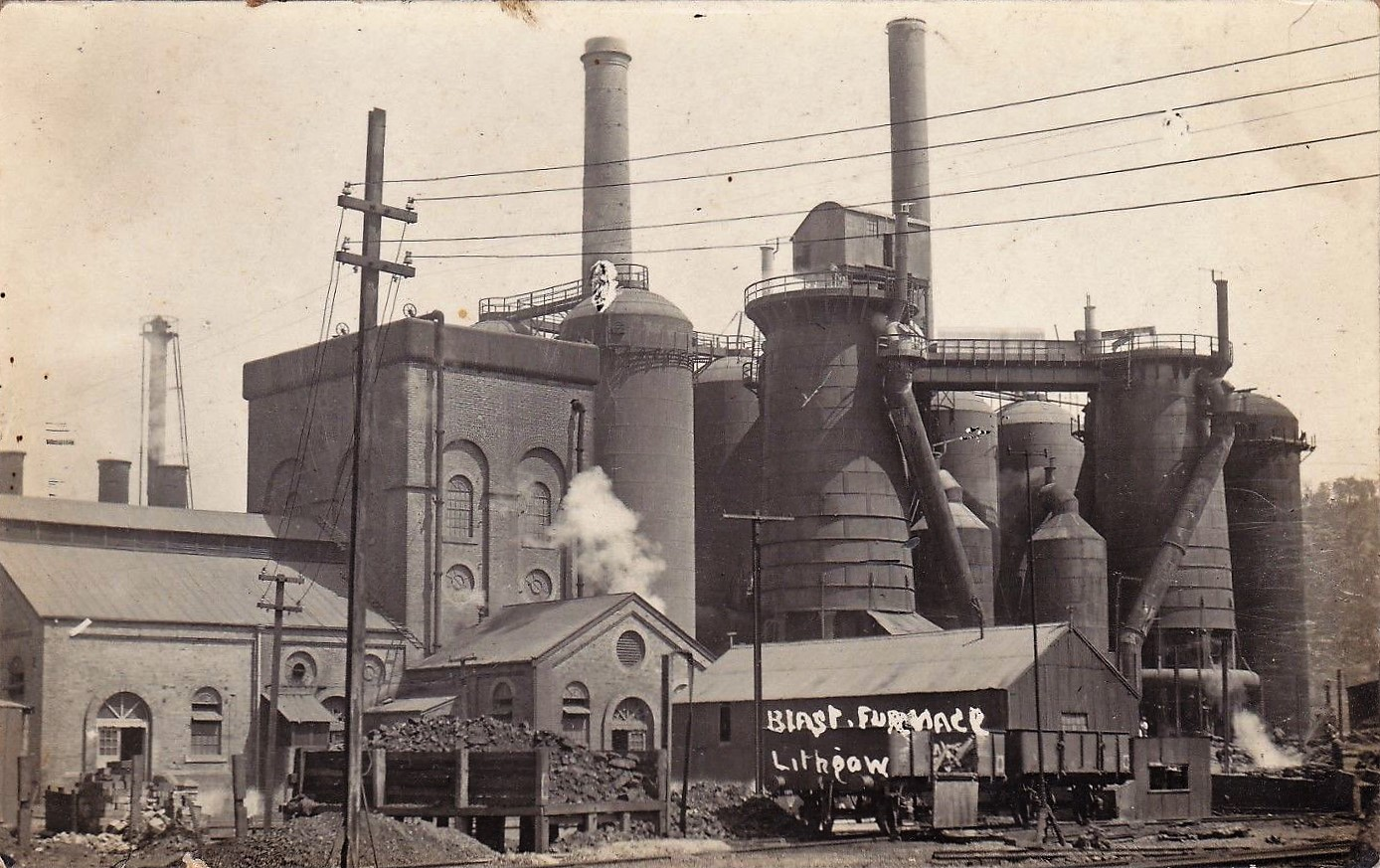
Blast Furnaces at Lithgow. Because there are two furnaces shown, this photograph was taken, between 1913 and 1928, during the period that the Hoskins owned the plant.

=== Initial expansion and protection ===
As part of the rescue deal, C & C Hoskins took over Sandford's contract to supply the iron and steel needs of the New South Wales Government, extending its term to nine years from 1 January 1908. Unfortunately for its new owners, apart from the blast furnace, much the plant was antiquated or otherwise not ready to supply the Government with its needs, particularly steel rails. That was largely due to the failures of the Sandford period, but it was Hoskins who wore the consequences, when the NSW Government cancelled the exclusive contract in late 1911.

The long-sought protection of the iron and steel industry was finally introduced, from the first day of 1909, by Andrew Fisher's Labor government, in the form of bounties to be paid under the Manufacturers' Encouragement Act, which made it a condition that those benefitting from bounties would pay "fair and reasonable wages". The government paid a bonus of 12s per ton from 1908 to 1914 and 8s per ton thereafter, until 1917, after which the industry would receive no further payments.

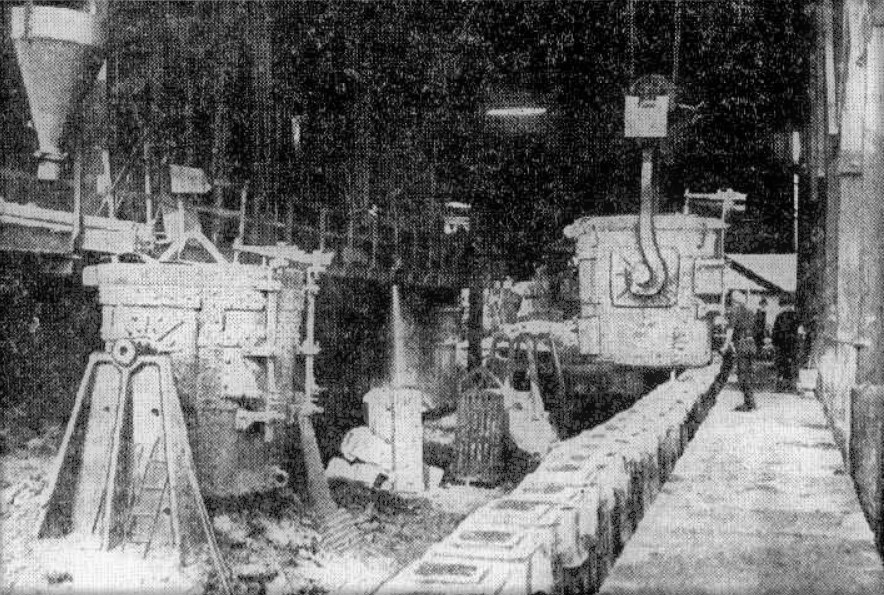
Teeming steel into ingot moulds, c. 1914

The Lithgow plant was in urgent need of expansion; the Hoskins brothers had the financial means to do so and experience of operating a heavy industrial enterprise. The new management immediately closed down marginal operations such as the sheet mill and galvanising plant—although these were to be reopened later—and began to renovate and rearrange the existing operations. An early improvement made was to introduce electric lighting; the works had previously relied upon 'slush lamps' for internal lighting.

The company had modernised and upgraded the mine at Carcoar, by mid 1909, and opened a second iron ore mine at Tallawang in 1911. They also started to use dolomite from the limestone quarry at Havilah, instead of importing it from England as Sandford had done.

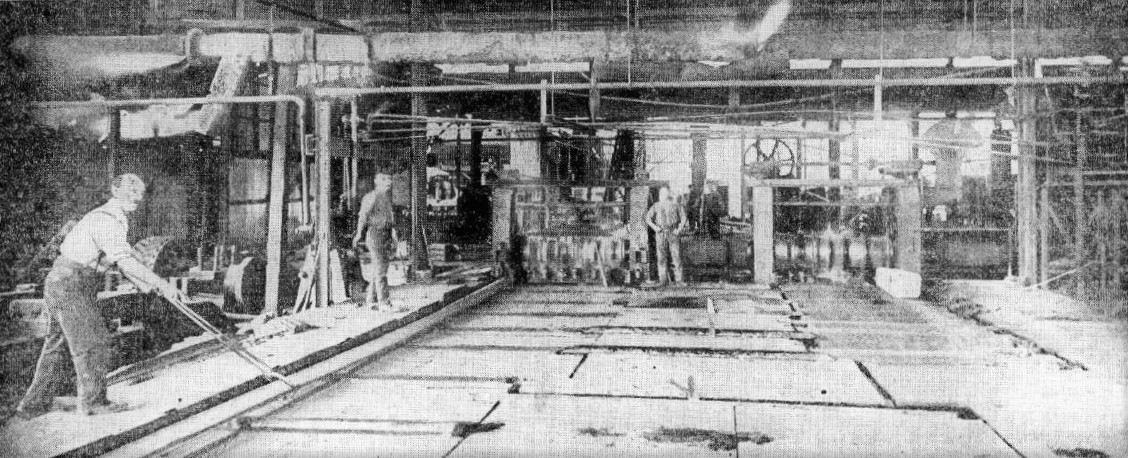
27-inch Mill rolling rails at Lithgow c.1914. A hot ingot of steel is being rolled into a billet in the roughing mill stand on the right. The man on the left is manipulating a rail that has been rolled in the finishing stand. Unusually for the time, the ingots cast at Lithgow were not first rolled into blooms but directly into billets.

Sandford had left a half-completed 24-inch rolling mill—for rolling heavy sections such as rails—but, when the new management completed it and tried to use it, it broke down. Hoskins imported parts for this mill, including a more powerful steam engine to drive it, and reworked its design to create a 27-inch mill. New reheating furnaces were built to suit rail rolling. It would take until 1911 for Lithgow to produce the first steel rails made in Australia. The works won contracts to supply rails for the new Trans-Australian Railway. and later, once again, the New South Wales Government Railways. Sandford's plans for Lithgow had provision for up to four blast furnaces. G & C Hoskins quickly built a second blast furnace—with its parts made at Hoskins' own works at Lithgow and Ultimo—which was almost identical to Sandford's, but slightly larger. This new furnace opened in 1913. They built a short rail line from the blast furnaces to the steel furnaces, allowing the pig iron to transferred in a molten state, using 30-ton capacity ladle cars. They added a new larger open hearth steel furnace that produced larger steel ingots to suit the new 27-inch mill. To match the increased production, more coke ovens were built.

By 1914, the Lithgow plant had been transformed into a viable iron and steel making operation.

=== First World War ===
Australia entered the First World War with a small but economically-viable iron and steel industry at Lithgow, a fortuitous circumstance because the country could no longer rely upon imports from Europe or America, for the duration of the war. Much of the credit for this belonged to Charles Hoskins.

During the war, the Lithgow plant was put to use making special grades of steel unobtainable from Europe. In 1916, it made ferromanganese needed for armaments, using manganese ore from a mine near Grenfell. It supplied the nearby Lithgow Small Arms Factory with steel for weapon manufacture. Charles Hoskins became personally involved in solving problems of wartime production. While the war was in progress, he was building a new branch railway line and an aerial ropeway to open up a new iron ore quarry at Cadia, as well as developing a coal mine and coke ovens at Wongawilli.

However, by the time of the war, difficulties associated with the location of his plant at Lithgow had already become apparent to Hoskins, leading him to reconsider its long term future. Consequently, the further expansion of the Lithgow plant effectively ceased by the end of the war. Hoskins had offered to sell the plant to the NSW Government in early 1914 but his offer was not taken up.

=== Difficulties, vision for the future, and sole control ===
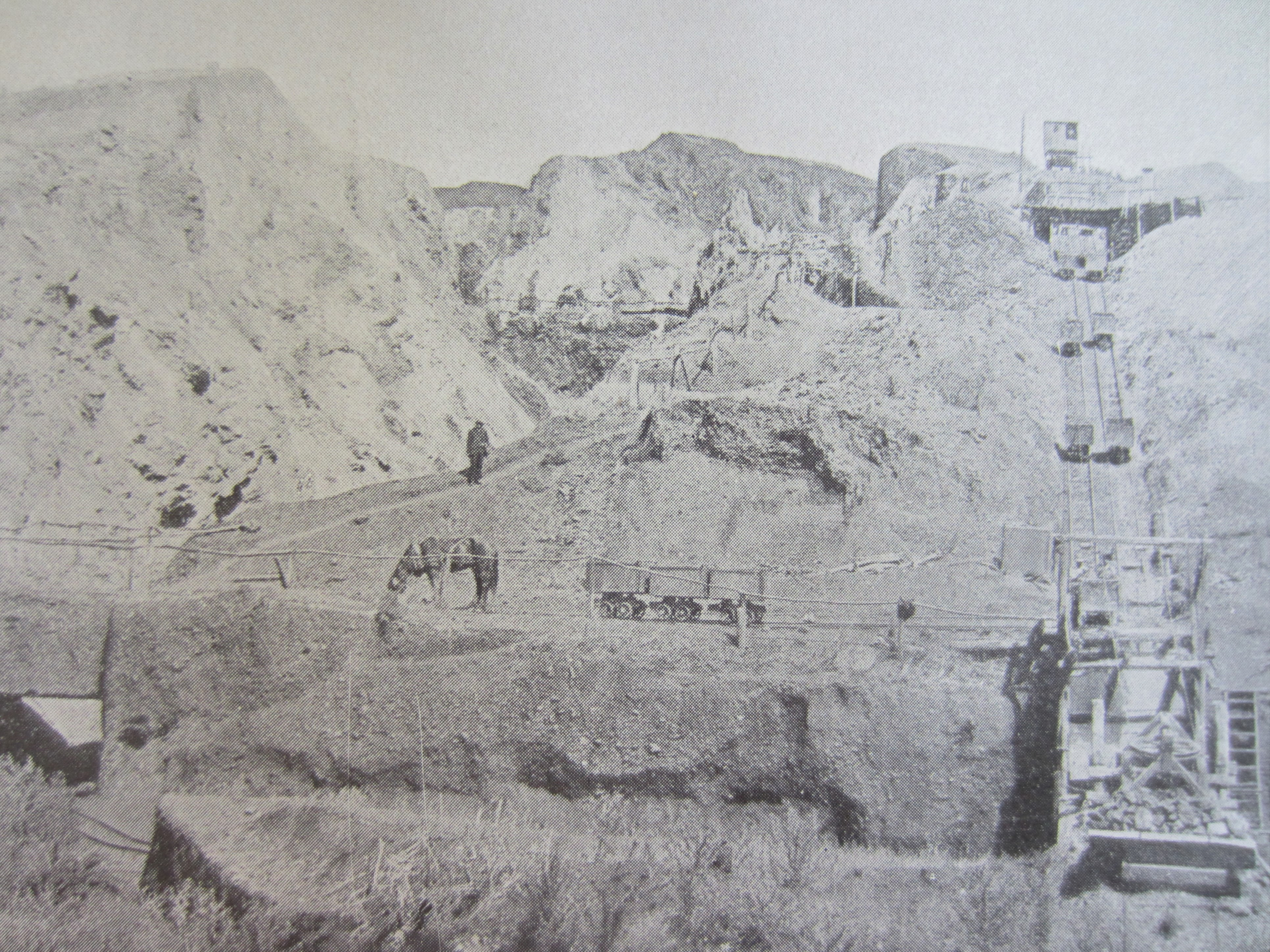
Iron ore quarry at Coombing Park, Carcoar c.1923

==== Iron ore ====
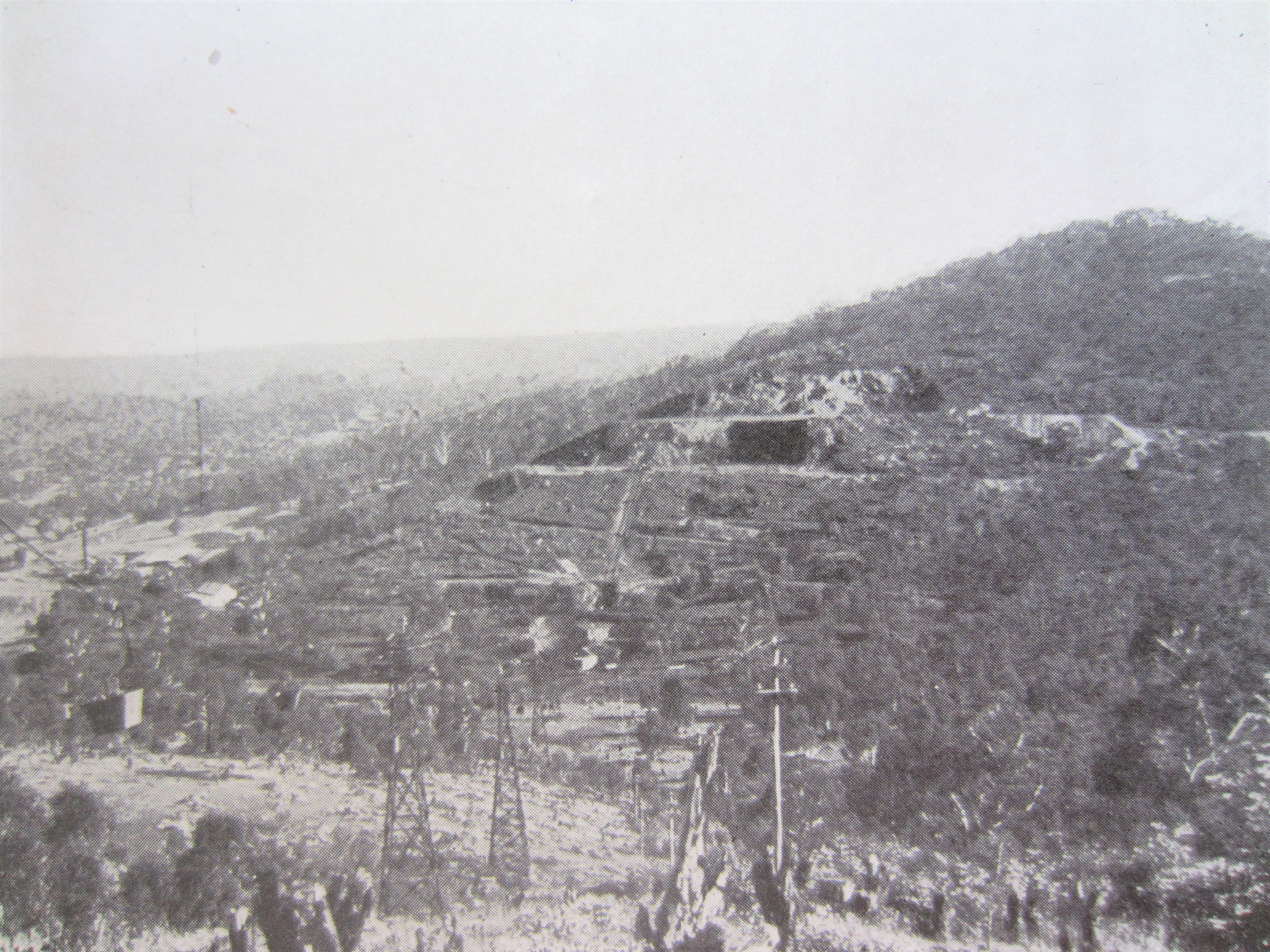
Cadia iron ore quarry c.1923. The quarry is on the hill and the aerial ropeway is visible to the front and left of centre.

The original decision to site an ironworks at Lithgow in 1875, was based upon the existence of coal and clay-band iron ore on the site, and a relatively small iron ore deposit nearby, at Mount Wilson. Those ore deposits were inadequate, to feed even the first Lithgow blast furnace, and soon had to be supplemented with ore carried from Back Creek, now known as Newbridge, near Blayney.

Once blast furnace operation recommenced at Lithgow, in 1907, ore had to be brought from further away, from Coombing Park—near Carcoar—(from April 1907 to May 1923), Tallawang (from 1911 to Feb. 1927), and Cadia (from 1918).

The ore from Carcoar was high in manganese and needed to be blended with other ore for some grades. The Tallawang ore was largely magnetite but the grade was only around 42% iron and the deposit relatively small. The ore from Cadia was hematite with some magnetite but averaging only around 51% iron with a high silica content; the silica content resulted in relatively large amounts of slag, when the ore was smelted, and increased the consumption of limestone flux.

New South Wales, although it possessed some widely dispersed smaller deposits of iron ore, was not well-endowed with large deposits. With two blast furnaces in operation at Lithgow, after 1913, not only did Hoskins need to rail his complex iron ores a considerable distance but his ore deposits had a limited life. This last aspect became more critical, once it was discovered that the ore deposit at Cadia—to which Lithgow's future was to be inextricably tied—contained a far lesser quantity of good-quality ore than had been estimated by the Government's geological surveyor.

G. & C. Hoskins explored and, in some cases, took leases on other deposits of iron ore in New South Wales; one was close to the eastern side of the Main Southern Railway between Breadalbane and Cullerin—mined sporadically from 1918, with the ore smelted at Lithgow—and others were near Crookwell, Michelago, Cumnock, Picton, Cudgegong near Mudgee, and even as far from Lithgow as Tabulam.

Through Charles Hoskins' own intransigence—his unwillingness to renew the lease on the existing terms and conditions—the company lost access to its deposit at Carcoar in 1923, after extracting only about a third of its ore.

Charles Hoskins had believed that he did not need to pay a royalty to the landowner of Coombing Park and could just make a claim under a Miner's Right, following amendments made to the Mining Act in 1919. A costly court battle ensued, in which the Mining Warden's Court found that the ore body remained the landowner's private property. It was a pyrrhic victory, as Hoskins did not relent, and that was the end of iron ore mining at Carcoar.

==== Coking coal ====
Lithgow was a coal mining centre, but only one of the mines, Oakey Park, produced coal that could produce coke, and even that was of marginal quality. As a temporary measure, coke was purchased, from the Commonwealth Oil Corporation, which made excellent coke at Newnes, but the Newnes operations ceased by early 1913. Hoskins opened new mines at Lithgow to obtain more suitable coal. He also began bringing coke from the Illawarra and mixing it with locally made coke, obtaining improved results. By around 1915, 75% to 80% of the coke being used at Lithgow was coming by rail from cokeworks in the Illawarra, and Hoskins was looking for an opportunity to acquire his own mine and cokeworks there.

In 1916, Hoskins bought the Wongawilli Colliery and built twenty modern 'beehive' coke ovens there. The off gas from the coke ovens was used to generate electricity to power the mine and ovens. Coke made there was carried to Lithgow by rail, from October 1916. Twenty more 'beehive' ovens were soon added. Even though Hoskins' company then had its own source of suitable coke, it had to bear the cost of bringing it to Lithgow by rail.

Between December 1918 and mid-1920, the mine and coke ovens at Wongawillia were shut down, while Hoskins' company erected a coal washery, to reduce the ash content and make freighting the coke to Lithgow more economic. In 1923, another 40 coke ovens were added, bringing the total to 80.

"Wonga", a little saddle-tank engine, worked at Wongawilli, from 1916 to October 1927; it had first been used by the British and Tasmanian Charcoal Iron Company in 1876, as part of an earlier attempt to operate a blast furnace in Australia.

==== Transport ====
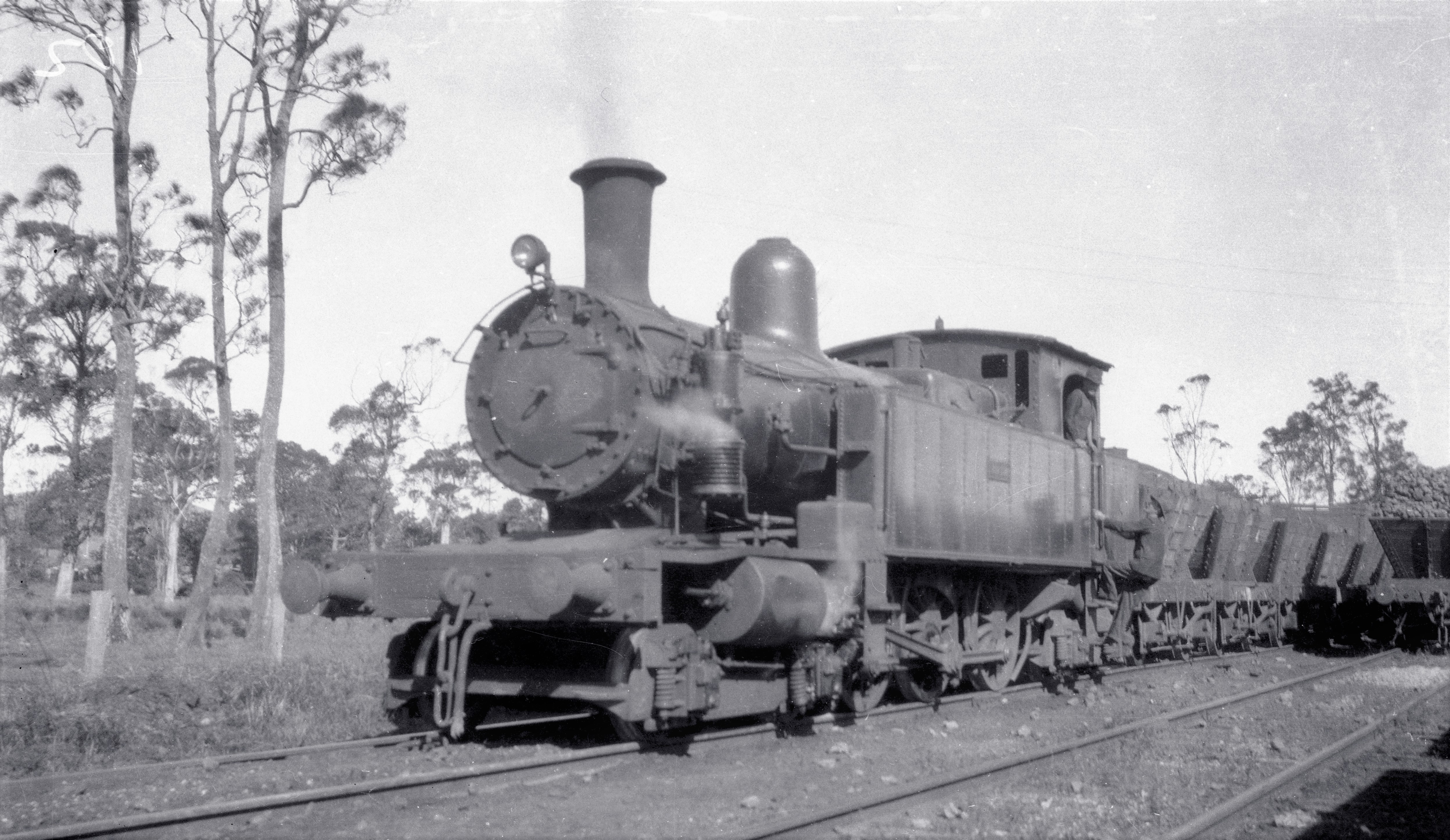
G & C Hoskins' locomotive 'Iron Duke' on the Cadia Mine railway, 1920s

Lithgow was totally dependent upon rail transport. Until 1921, the railway west of Lithgow toward the ore mines was single track. Limestone, for use as smelting flux, needed to be carried from Ben Bullen and Havilah, and later from Excelsior near Cullen Bullen. The cost of government-railway freight and sensitivity to increases in freight rates were unavoidable disadvantages of Lithgow's inland site and its distance from the ore and limestone quarries and the locations where most of its coke was made. From 1918, the company also paid the operating costs of a private railway line—Cadia Mine railway line—that ran from Cadia to exchange sidings at Spring Hill, from where the iron ore was brought by the government-owned railway to Lithgow.

Until 1910, rail traffic from Lithgow to the coast and Sydney was constrained by the single-track Lithgow Zig Zag. Even after the Zig Zag was replaced by the Ten Tunnels Deviation (1910) and the line duplicated—including the Glenbrook Deviation (1913)—the distance from the coast and the gradients of the Western railway remained an issue. Banking engines were often needed to assist heavy freight trains over the mountains from Lithgow. Although Hoskins sought new sources of iron ore in other states, it would never be feasible to bring iron ore from a coastal port to Lithgow; in the longer term, the blast furnaces could not remain in operation at Lithgow.

==== Competition and product quality ====
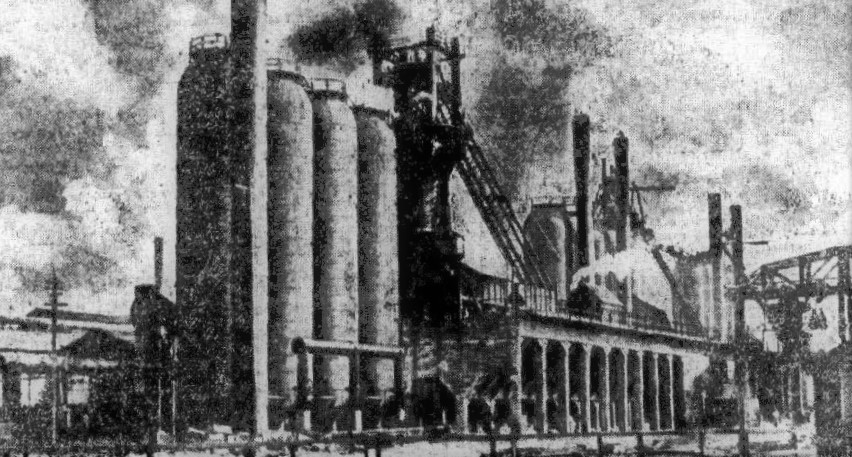
The three modern blast furnaces at BHP's plant in Newcastle in 1923. Each made 50% more iron than both Lithgow furnaces combined.

BHP's Newcastle Steelworks opened in 1915. However, initially, Lithgow was not badly affected by competition, due to buoyant demand for steel and absence of import competition, during the First World War, and the government bonuses paid until 1917. That began to change once the war ended.

In the early 1920s, the young iron and steel industry in Australia found itself subject to intense competition from imports; this affected both Lithgow and Newcastle. However, BHP Newcastle works' new general manager, Essington Lewis, began a revival of that works, with a drive for efficiency and technical excellence; these efforts were successful to such an extent that by the early 1930s, Newcastle's costs and prices were low by global standards.

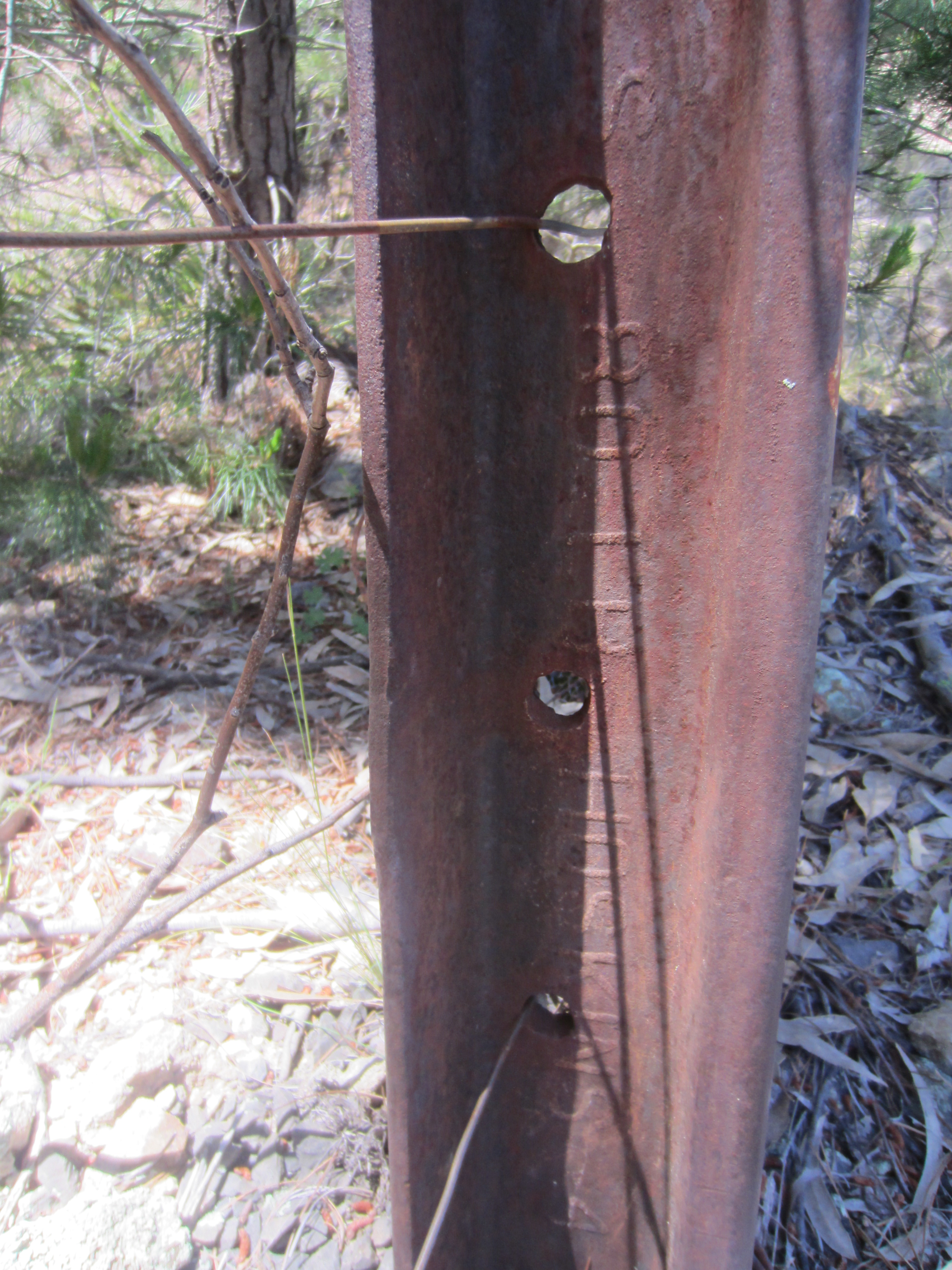
Hoskins 80 lb rail reused as a fence post

The newer and larger BHP works could produce larger quantities of rolled steel products of a higher quality, at a lower cost of production. Newcastle's seaport location brought access to virtually inexhaustible amounts of very high-grade iron ore from its mine at Iron Knob; it allowed BHP to ship its products to Sydney and to interstate markets by sea, at lower cost than Lithgow could by rail. By the early 1920s, Newcastle had three blast furnaces, each of which was capable of making 50% more pig iron than both of Hoskins' Lithgow blast-furnaces combined.

BHP had access to more modern American technology and employed more professionals. Consequently, the quality of their steel was higher than Hoskins could make at Lithgow; in 2006 it was stated that, "rail produced before 1914 and all Hoskins rail are generally regarded as being of dubious metallurgical composition".

BHP also had vast cash flows from its Broken Hill silver-lead mines and smelters and, increasingly, from its profitable steel operations, with which to fund expansion and enhancement of its steelworks. Hoskins' family-owned company could not match BHP's ability to fund new capital works.

==== Labour ====
Lithgow always had relatively higher labour costs—a legacy of the industrial relations arrangements of William Sandford—and a relatively strong culture of unionism. Under competitive conditions, labour costs, poor labour relations, and strikes affected the long-term viability of the Lithgow plant. Wage rates at coastal locations were lower and unions perceived as less troublesome there.

==== Vision for the future and sole control ====
Charles Hoskins began to see that his works at Lithgow had inherent problems that could not be resolved—even more so, after BHP's Newcastle works became a formidable competitor, from 1915 onward. He began to form a vision for a larger, more modern steelworks on the coast, close to a seaport and to the source of most of Lithgow's coke.

In 1919, Charles Hoskins bought out his older brother George's share of the company G & C Hoskins, renaming the company Hoskins Iron and Steel Limited in July 1920. George retired, leaving Charles—by then in his late sixties—in sole charge of the destiny of the company.

== Plans for Port Kembla ==
Port Kembla was selected, by the New South Wales Government at the end of 1898 as main port for area and in 1901 construction commenced on two breakwaters to protect two existing coal jetties at the site and to enclose an area of seabed that became the Outer Harbour. In 1908, it first became the site of heavy industry when the Electrolytic Refining and Smelting Company's plant was opened.

Hoskins had not been the first to consider establishing an iron and steel industry in the Illawarra. Two others had visions for such an industry, Joseph Mitchell and Patrick Lahiff. Lahiff built a small blast furnace at Mount Pleasant and made some iron in 1872; he continued to advocate for an iron industry in the Illawarra, well into the 1890s.

The first association of Charles Hoskins with Port Kembla was in 1911, when there was talk of an ironworks at Port Kembla to process Tasmanian iron ore. In 1912, BHP planned to set up a large steelworks at Newcastle to exploit its vast South Australian iron ore deposits. Port Kembla was a site that BHP had considered before deciding upon Newcastle. That left the stage clear for Hoskins to take advantage of Port Kembla's seaport location, amidst the Southern Coalfields renown for their excellent hard coking coal.

Charles Hoskins' first step was when G & C Hoskins purchased the Wongawilli colliery at Dapto, in 1916, and established a cokeworks there. Hoskins had secured a source of coal and coke, close to a seaport at which iron ore could be unloaded. At first, the high-quality coke would be railed to Lithgow. However, he soon had more coke making capacity than he needed. Hoskins' approach to industrial relations was no different at Wongawilli and there were numerous strikes there.

In late 1920, the company acquired 380 acres of the Wentworth Estate, at Port Kembla, as the site for a steelworks. Also in 1920, Hoskins secured leases over an ore deposit near Mount Heemskirk in Tasmania, and apparently planned to ship the ore via rail to the port of Strahan. At an official event in Wollongong in April 1921, Hoskins spoke openly about his plans for a steelworks on the land that he had purchased at Port Kembla but also about what he wanted from the NSW Government first, a lease for a private wharf at the harbour and a new railway line connecting Port Kembla to the Main Southern line.

In July 1923, he announced that a new integrated steelworks would be built at Port Kembla, without at this stage mentioning closing Lithgow; it was stated that Port Kembla was intended for the ‘interstate trade'. Later in 1923, the government announced the building of a rail line to Moss Vale, which would allow limestone flux to be carried from Marulan. The company gained the lease for a private wharf at Port Kembla that would be completed in 1928.

Charles Hoskins retired as managing director in 1924, leaving the question of the future of the Lithgow works open. The construction of the new plant at Port Kembla would be for his successor as Chairman, his son Cecil Hoskins. His other son A. Sidney Hoskins would take charge of the Lithgow Steelworks. Together the two sons were co-Managing Directors of the company, which after their father's death would gradually transfer operations from the old works to the new.

== Family, homes, and personal life ==
Although his father had died when he was young, Charles Hoskins was not an orphan, as his obituary would incorrectly state; his mother, Wilmot Eliza Hoskins, lived until 1896. He also had an uncle, William Hoskins, in Australia, as well as two brothers, George John Hoskins (1847-1926)—his business partner—and Thomas, and at least one sister. Although Thomas was not initially involved in G & C Hoskins, he later became the firm's Melbourne representative and later the manager of the works at Midland Junction, in Western Australia.

Charles married Emily Wallis (1861-1928) on 22 December 1881. They raised eight children; sons Henry Guildford (1887-1916), Cecil Harold later Sir Cecil (1889-1971), Arthur Sidney, known as Sid, (1892-1959), and daughters, Florence Maud, later Mrs. F.A. Crago (1882-1973), Wilmot Elsie, later Mrs F.A. Weisener (1884-1964), Hilda Beatrice (1893-1912), Nellie Constance (1894-1914), and Kathleen Gertrude, later Mrs E.C. Mackey (1900-1950). Another daughter, Emily May (b.1886), died at five months.

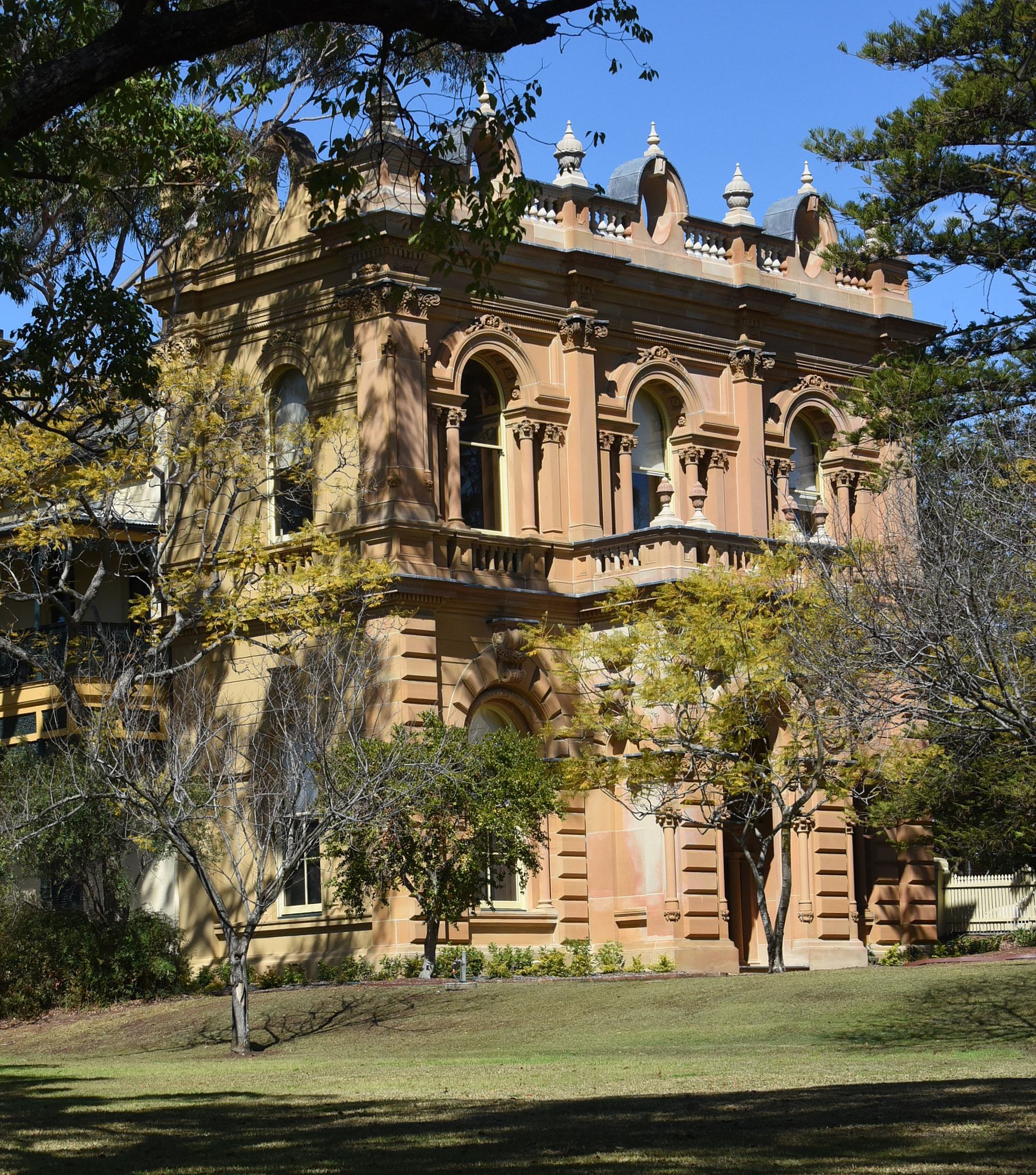
'Illyria', the Hoskins' family home at Strathfield until 1908

The family moved often; their choices of housing in Sydney reflected the family's rapidly increasing prosperity. During the 1880s, they lived first at 'Exeter Terrace' on Crystal Street, Petersham, then on Macauley Street, Leichhardt, then at 'Auburn Vale', Granville, and later at 'Waverley' on Croyden Street, Petersham. In the 1890s, they lived first at 'Koorinda' on Albert Street, Strathfield and later at 'Illyria', on The Boulevard, Strathfield.

Hoskins built 'Illyria' in the early 1890s. With his typical thrift and practicality, the stone facade of this grand building was obtained from the City Bank building in Pitt Street—built in 1873—which had been gutted by a fire in October 1890. The stonework was dismantled and transported in sections to its new site and re-erected in the same orientation as the original bank building, becoming the facade of a more conventional Italianate mansion.

It was at 'Illyria' that Charles was able to indulge his passion for motor cars, buying the second Ford car imported to Australia, in 1904, and a succession of other cars, including a 1908 Clément-Talbot. His three sons shared a 'Star' 7 h.p. car; all were driving well before drivers' licences were introduced in N.S.W. in 1910. The garage suite, at the rear of the house, was probably built during Hoskins' time to house his vehicles, making it one of the earliest private garages in Sydney.

Hoskins' sons attended local schools including Burwood Public School, Homebush Grammar School at Strathfield, and the boys briefly boarded at Kings College in Goulburn, while their parents went to Perth in relation to Goldfields Pipeline. In 1903 Guildford, Cecil and Sid all commenced as day students at Newington College. The older boys had left school by 1906 but Sid remained at Newington until 1907. The older Hoskins boys were not notable students, although Sid is recorded in the school magazine, The Newingtonian, as winning the Preparatory School French prize in 1904 and the Upper Modern Form English prize in 1907. ‘The Hoskins Saga’ records that when the Hoskins family moved to Lithgow in 1908 Sid was sent to the neighbouring school Cooerwull Academy. The same source says that Sid subsequently left school early, after convincing the family that he should be part of the family business at Lithgow.

Hilda Hoskins attended the Presbyterian Ladies' College at Croydon, and it is probable that her sisters also attended the school.

In 1907, his eldest daughter, Florence, and her new husband were living at 'Mevaina', on Appian Way, Burwood, in an exclusive 'garden city' influenced residential precinct—known as the 'Hoskins Estate'—founded in 1903 by Charles Hoskins' brother, George, who lived at nearby 'St Cloud'.

After the takeover of the Lithgow works, in early 1908, Charles and his family moved from Strathfield to Marrangaroo, west of Bowenfels and Lithgow, living in William Sandford's former home, 'Eskroy Park', which was situated on 2000 acres of land. They also spent time at Lawson in the Blue Mountains, having an association with the area that went back well before their move to Lithgow. Later, they were to make their home in the area and contribute to the beautification of its parks and gardens.

Charles and Emily lost three of their children, within the space of four years. In 1912, his daughter Hilda drove her car onto the level crossing at 'Eskroy Park' where it was struck by a locomotive. Although she was taken to the house, she died without regaining consciousness. In 1914, his daughter, Nellie, was living at 'Narbothong', 24 Badgerys Crescent, Lawson—probably the Hoskins' mountain holiday home—where stricken with tuberculosis, she died, before the family's new home nearby—built with her recovery in mind—could be completed. Their eldest son, Henry Guildford Hoskins (known as Guildford) was fatally injured in an acetylene gas explosion, in 1916, while repairing a gas generator, at 'Eskroy Park'. Although moved to a hospital in Sydney, he died. He was 28 when he died and already a significant figure in the company. Guildford left a widow Jeannie (née Mathieson), an infant daughter, Lynette, and a posthumously-born son, also Henry Guildford.

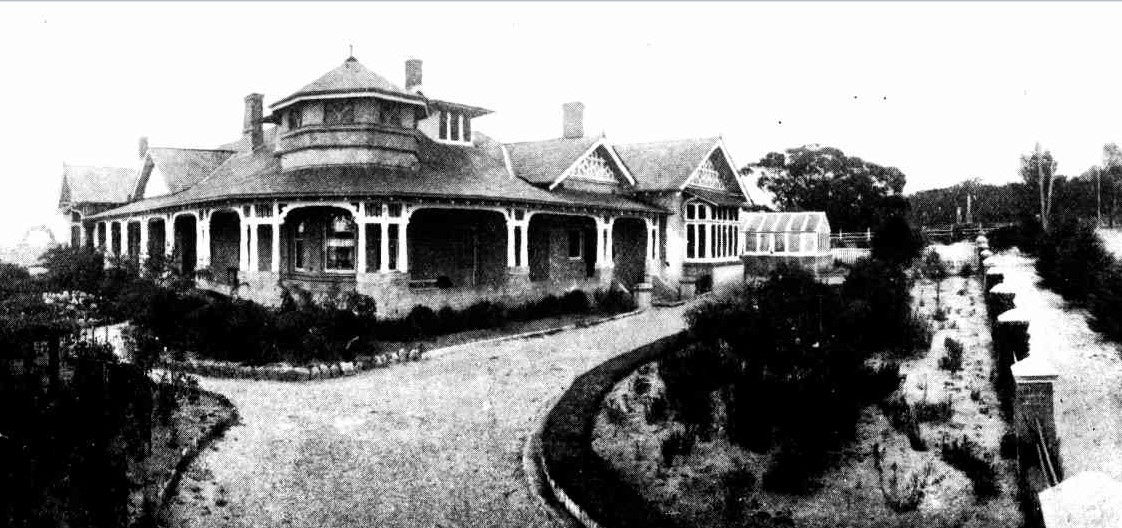
'Cadia Park' at Bullaburra, the home of Charles Hoskins from 1914 to 1922. (Unknown photographer, taken c.1927.)

The family's home 'Cadia Park', on five acres of land, at Bullaburra, lay close to the boundary of that mountain settlement with Lawson and was completed in 1914. It had eight bedrooms, billiard-room, drawing and dining rooms, three bathrooms, entrance hall, maids' dining room and larder, and kitchen. Separate out-buildings include stables, a garage accommodating six cars, and laundry. The house was situated so as to have magnificent views over the adjacent valley. Outdoors, 'Cadia Park' had grassed tennis courts, shrubberies, two large swimming baths, one for adults and one for children, and extensive gardens. Hoskins also leased some crown land nearby for use as a private zoo to which he allowed public admission. The Hoskins made 'Cadia Park' their home, until 1922. Charles sold the property in 1923, with the land-holding totalling 42 acres.

Charles Hoskins moved, in 1922, to what would be his last home, Ashton in Elizabeth Bay.

== Later life and death ==
After he stepped down as Managing Director of Hoskins Iron and Steel, in 1924, Charles Hoskins had only a short retirement; he was in poor health during that time. He died at his home on 14 February 1926, not living to see the fulfillment of his plans for Port Kembla.

He was survived by his wife, Emily, two sons, three daughters and twenty-two grandchildren. He left a relatively small personal legacy of £12,018. His fortune of well in excess of £1,000,000 had been distributed among his large family, by means of a family company C.H. Hoskins Co. Limited, set up in 1904. The family company also owned the Kembla Building, in Sydney, a 12-storey office building completed in late 1924. Charles Hoskins' fortune had been made in his own lifetime, starting from nothing at age thirteen. He had been very much a self-made man.

His widow Emily died in November 1928, having lived just long enough to light the new blast furnace at Port Kembla in August of the same year.

Charles Hoskins' grave lies in the Congregational section of the Rookwood Cemetery; nearby are the graves of his wife and his children, Florence, Hilda, Nellie and Henry.

== Legacy ==
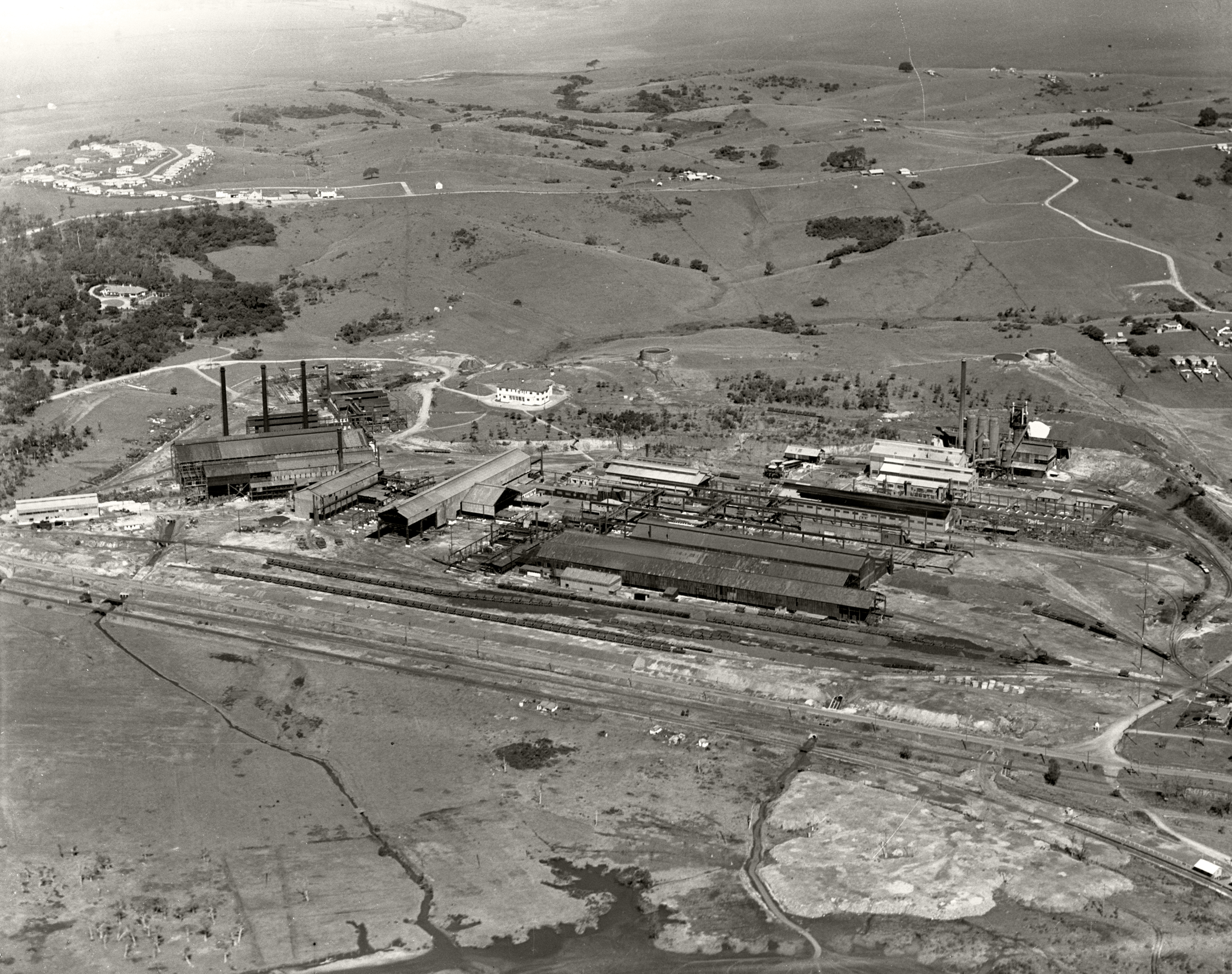
Hoskins Kembla Works in 1936 just after the merger with BHP. Left: open-hearth steelmaking plant and to its right the Administration Building. Centre: rolling mills. Right-rear: blast furnace.

Hoskins' greatest achievement was to save and expand the Lithgow steelworks, especially during the years from 1911 to 1913. During that time, he had to rectify and expand an inadequate loss-making plant, while in conflict, simultaneously, with some of his workforce and with his largest customer, the N.S.W Government, and under the scrutiny of a Royal Commission.

However, his most lasting legacy is the large steelworks at Port Kembla. Although he did not live to see it, his vision and foresight had led to its creation. For many decades, it was known as 'Hoskins Kembla Works'; now, no longer known by that name, it is still the site of most of Australia's steel production.

Although there had been some industrial development at Port Kembla, prior to the opening of the steelworks, it would become the most significant driver of the growth of Wollongong. It was Charles Hoskins who had told an enthusiastic meeting there, in April 1921, "You want to get it into your heads, that Wollongong is going to be a city."

Between 1928 and early 1932, some parts of the old Lithgow works were re-erected at Port Kembla but other parts, including the two Lithgow blast furnaces, made the journey to Port Kembla only as scrap iron to be fed into the furnaces of the younger plant. In December 1931, the last steel was rolled at Lithgow. Only very little remains of the Lithgow works today, in what is now the Blast Furnace Park.

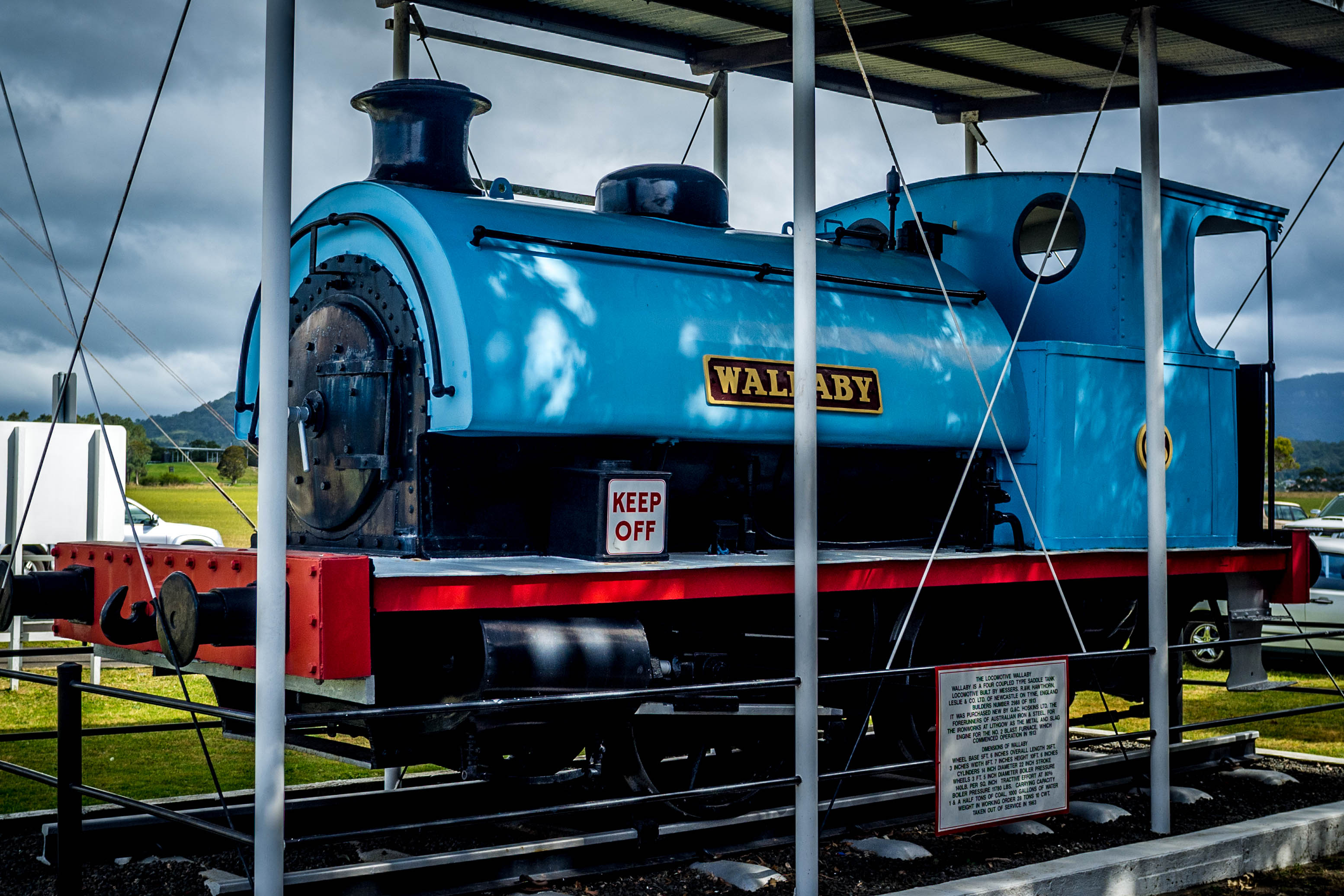
'Wallaby', built in 1913, a relic of the Lithgow steelworks

'Wallaby', a locomotive from the Lithgow steelworks, survives. From 1913, 'Wallaby' worked the then new line to Hoskins' two Lithgow blast furnaces and after that was at Port Kembla until 1963. Another ex-Lithgow locomotive, 'Possum', also was at Port Kembla until 1967; it was donated to Lithgow District Historical Society, in 1969, and returned to Lithgow, where it survives as an outdoor exhibit at Eskbank House Museum. Hoskins Iron and Steel Limited become a part of Australian Iron and Steel Limited, a new company—also part owned by Dorman Long, Howard Smith Limited, Baldwins and preference shareholders—that was set up in March 1928 to build and operate the new plant at Port Kembla and its associated iron ore, limestone and coal mines.

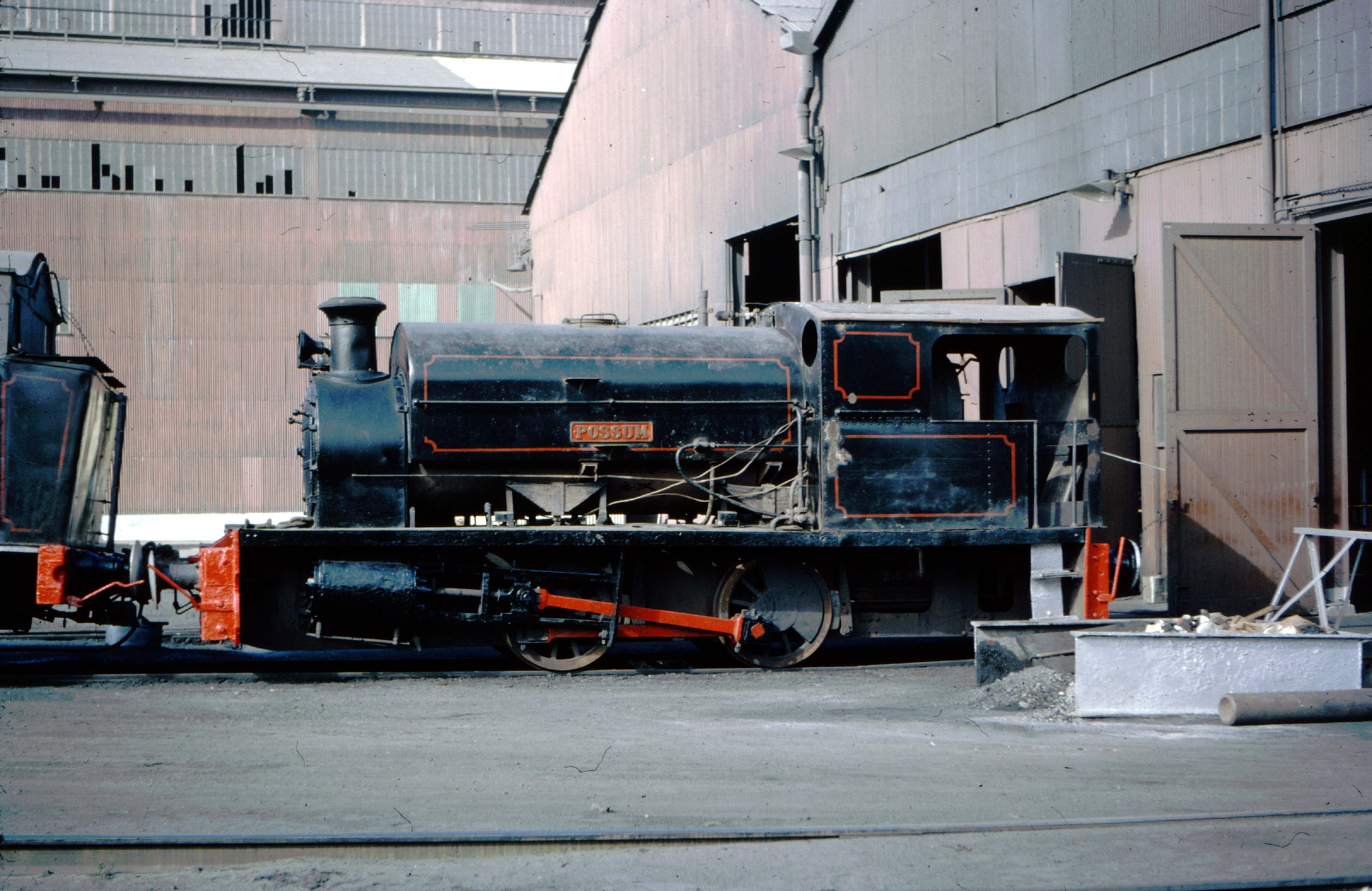
'Possum; built 1912, bought by Hoskins in 1919, and shown here working, at Port Kembla, in 1965

In 1935, a victim of the Great Depression and other difficulties, this company became, via an exchange of ordinary shares, a subsidiary of BHP. Preference shares of Australian Iron and Steel Limited remained trading on the stock exchange, until 1959 when BHP's offer was accepted and the AIS preference shares were converted to ordinary BHP shares. Charles Hoskins' sons Cecil and Sidney Hoskins remained managers at Port Kembla and directors of Australian Iron and Steel Ltd. The Hoskins family were major shareholders of BHP. Under BHP ownership, the plant was greatly expanded, and outlived the Newcastle works. Following the demerger of BHP's steel interests from the rest of the company, it is now owned by BlueScope. The Hoskins Memorial Presbyterian Church in Lithgow was intended as a memorial to his son Henry Guildford Hoskins and also to commemorate his daughters Hilda and Nellie but it also commemorates Charles, his wife Emily, and two of his grandsons, all of whom died before its opening. Standing on an opposite corner of the intersection of Mort and Bridge Streets from the church, the Charles Hoskins Memorial Institute building—opened in 1927—was a campus of the Western Sydney University, between 2014 and 2018. It is now the Maldhan Ngurr Ngurra Lithgow Transformation Hub, "a collaborative space for community, business and industry to come together and explore a wealth of possibilities for the Lithgow region to ensure a vibrant and thriving future."

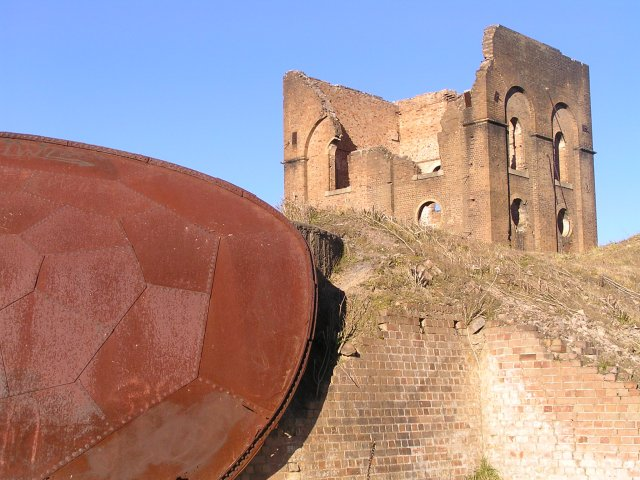
Ruins at blast furnace site, Lithgow

Charles Hoskins had initiated the Hoskins Trust, in 1919, for charitable purposes, endowing a fund to support the Hoskins Memorial Church. Since 2006, this trust has awarded an annual scholarship, the Hoskins Lithgow Scholarship, for a Lithgow resident to study at a university or other tertiary education institution.

Although Hoskins and his family endowed Lithgow with fine buildings, their longer-term legacy there is mixed. The stark and desolate ruin of the blast furnace's blower house stands as a reminder that the closure of the town's main industry—at the height of the Great Depression—and the exodus of skilled managers and workers to Port Kembla—with their families, about 5000 people—was a blow from which the future prospects of the town never recovered. In 1929, Lithgow had the fourth largest urban population in New South Wales—after Sydney, Newcastle, and Broken Hill—but by 2016, it was 36th; Lithgow's population fell from around 18,000, in 1929, to only 11,530 in 2016. At the 2021 census, the population had fallen slightly.

A former garden at Lawson, 'Hilda Gardens', was funded by Hoskins and dedicated to the memory of his daughter, Hilda. He paid £50 annually for its upkeep during his lifetime. It survived the 1930s, at least, in more or less original condition, after which modifications were made to the bowling green. Sadly, this garden has been completely subsumed by the growth of the Lawson Bowling Club and no trace of it remains. Not far from where the gardens once were, the house, 'Narbethong', still stands in Badgerys Crescent.

The mansion that Hoskins built in the early 1890s, 'Illyria' at Strathfield, was renamed 'Holyrood' by its next owner—William James Adams, a nephew and an heir of George Adams—and survives to this day. It is heritage listed and better known now as part of Santa Sabina College. Charles's home near Lithgow, 'Eskroy Park'—earlier the home of William Sandford— is now part of the clubhouse of the Lithgow Golf Club.

Hoskins' house, 'Cadia Park', on the Great Western Highway, Bullaburra, was too large to be a practical family residence. It was sold several times in the 1920s, before becoming a convent in 1930. It was still a convent when the old building was destroyed by the massive bushfire of December 1977. Nothing has been rebuilt upon the site, leaving only an ornamental rotunda made of iron ore, a brick boundary fence, and the overgrown garden beds, pathways and terraces of Hoskins' extensive gardens.

== Biographies ==
Charles Henry Hoskins is the subject of two biographical works, The Ironmaster, written by his grandson Don Hoskins (published 1995) and The Hoskins Saga, written by his son Sir Cecil Hoskins (published 1969). He also has an entry in the Australian Dictionary of Biography.

== See also ==
- William Sandford
- Lithgow Blast Furnace
- Cadia Mine railway line
- Cecil Hoskins
