= Spring Hill, New South Wales (Orange) =

Coordinates: 33°23′54″S 149°09′08″E

Spring Hill is a small village 13 km south-east of Orange, Australia. Its buildings date back to the 1870s and a Heritage Trail has been established for tourists. At the 2021 census, Spring Hill had a population of 304.

== Mining ==
Following the failure of Messrs G. & C. Hoskins in 1915 to persuade the New South Wales Government to construct a branch railway from the sidings at Spring Hill to the mines at Cadia where they had agreed to remove the ironstone overlay for processing in the ironworks at Lithgow, the company decided to construct a private railway line from the Iron Duke Copper Mine at Cadia to the Great Western Railway at Spring Hill. The line remained until 1945, having enjoyed a renaissance during the Second World War.
