= Hidden Valley mine =

Gold mine in Morobe, Papua New Guinea

Coordinates: 6.9678°S 146.4248°E

- Location within Papua New Guinea
- Location: Morobe Province, Papua New Guinea
- Products: Gold

The Hidden Valley mine is a gold mine in Papua New Guinea. The mine is located in the south-east of the country in Morobe Province. The mine has roughly estimated reserves of 6.4 million oz of gold.
