= Cadia Mine railway line =

Railway line in New South Wales, Australia

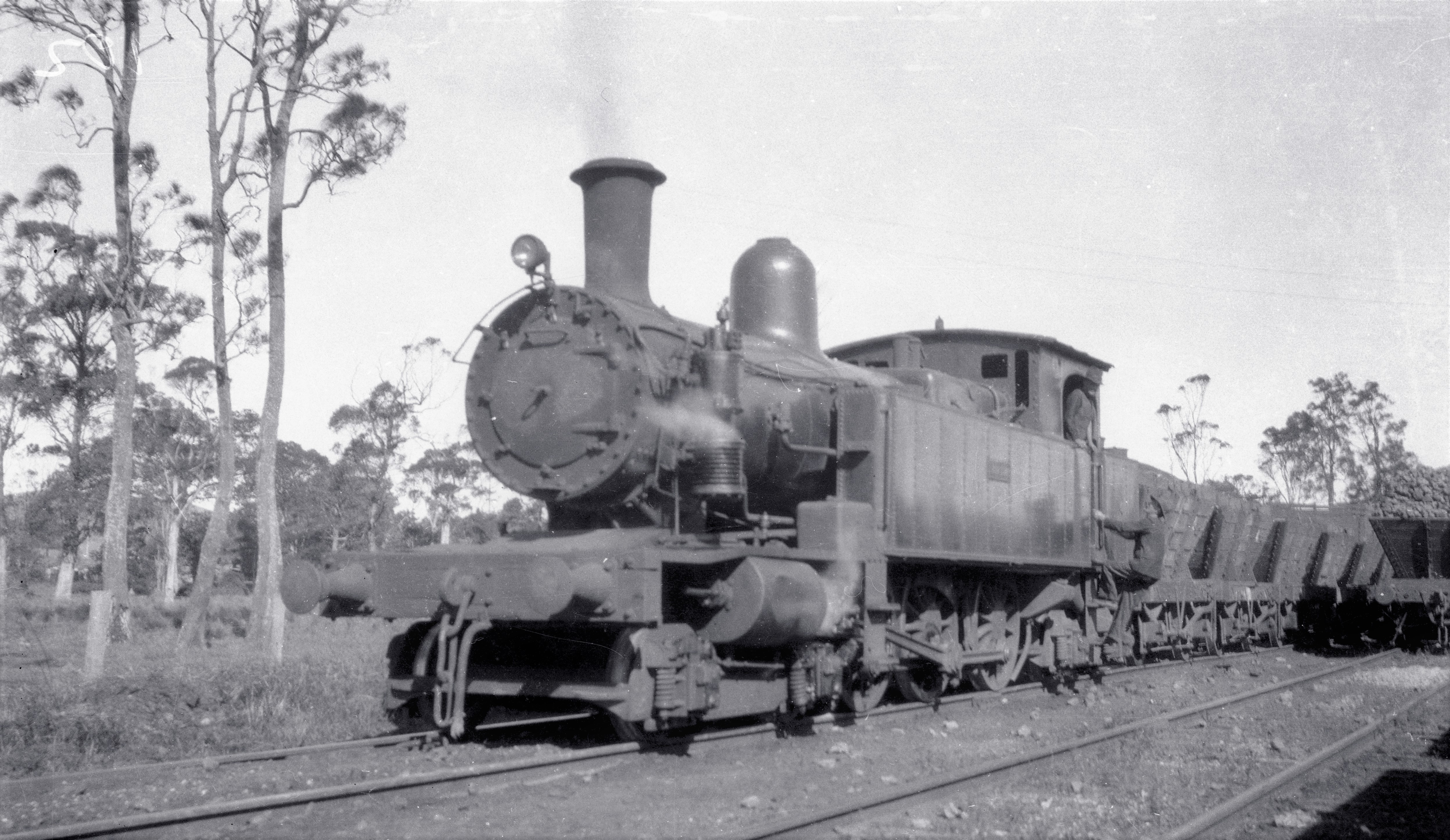
- 'Iron Duke' hauling iron ore wagons, 1920s.

Overview
- Owner: Government of New South Wales
- Termini: Spring Hill; Cadia
- Connecting lines: Main Western Line
- Stations: 0

Service
- Operator(s): G & C Hoskins Ltd until July 1920, Hoskins Iron & Steel Ltd from July 1920 to March 1928, Australian Iron & Steel Ltd from March 1928 to late 1928, and New South Wales Department of Railways 1941 to 1945.

History
- Opened: 1919
- Completed: 1918
- First closure: 1928
- Reopened: 1941
- Closed: 1945

Technical
- Line length: 11.5 mi (18.5 km)
- Number of tracks: 1
- Track gauge: 4 ft 8 1/2 in (1,435 mm) standard gauge

The Cadia Mine railway line is a closed and dismantled railway line in New South Wales, Australia. The 18.5 km (11.5 mile) long branch line started where it branched from the Main Western Railway line at Spring Hill and ended at Cadia. Its main role was to carry iron ore from the quarry at Cadia and for much of its life was privately operated.

== History and description ==
=== Historical context ===
Although Cadia had been mined for gold and copper, a significant deposit of iron ore also had been identified there. A branch line to Cadia had been advocated for some years, with alternative routes from Spring Hill, Millthorpe or Carcoar being identified.

After the blast furnace at Lithgow opened in May 1907, one reason for the iron ore deposit at 'Iron Duke' (Big Cadia) not being mined—although William Sandford had taken out a sub-lease to do so—was the absence of a rail connection and the poor state of the nearby roads. Sandford instead opened an ore quarry at Coombing Park near Carcoar, The subsequent owner of the Lithgow Blast Furnace, G & C Hoskins Ltd, let the sub-lease over the Cadia deposit lapse but later took out a new sub-lease, for a payment of £1,000 per year and 6d. per ton of ore.

=== Agreement ===
By 1915, Charles Hoskins was proposing that the N.S.W. Government build and operate a line to Cadia from Spring Hill but did not rule out building and operating a private line. The final arrangement agreed was that the N.S.W. Government would own the branch line, and provide rolling stock other than locomotives; G & C Hoskins Limited would provide a locomotive, maintain and operate the branch line, and pay the Government at a rate of 15% of the standard freight rate. Contemporary reports state that G. & C. Hoskins surveyed and constructed the line, at a cost to the company of £118,000. The route of the line was surveyed in early 1916 and work at the Spring Hill end also commenced then.

=== Route and description ===
The line branched off the down track of Main Western Line just past the Orange end of Spring Hill railway station, turning to the west about a quarter of a mile later and passing through the Spring Hill exchange sidings. At the exchange sidings, there was an engine shed, capable of holding one locomotive, possibly later extended to be able to house two, and a water tank fed by a wind-driven pump. The line then ran just south of the road to Orange, until just past the small village of Spring Terrace, where it continued westward. The elevation of the line increased gradually between Spring Hill and Spring Terrace. There were three private sidings between Spring Hill and Cadia; 'Spring Terrace'—at a location to the west of the modern-day village, approximately 4 miles along the line—'Summit' approximately 5.5 miles along the line, and 'Cadia Road', 'Summit' was described as a 'staging siding' and was at the bottom of a relative steep grade towards Spring Hill and before the beginning of the long decline to Cadia. The last five miles to Cadia decreased in elevation at an average gradient of 1 in 55 and had many curves. The line terminated on the eastern side of Cadiangullong Creek and the northern side of Cadia Creek—about three-quarters of a mile from the ore quarry and one and a half miles from the town—at the location of the powerhouse. The line could go no farther due to the steep-sided valley. Ore from the quarry was carried by an aerial ropeway, across the valley to the loading point for the trains.

The line was laid in 80 lb. rails, most likely rolled by G. & C. Hoskins at their Lithgow steelworks.

=== Private operation (1918–1928) ===
The line was completed in September 1918 and officially opened on 17 February 1919. It was a goods line, with iron ore traffic predominating. From 1918 to 1929, 1,682,000 tons of iron ore was mined from a surface deposit known as 'Iron Duke'. During this period, trains consisting of four-wheeled coal wagons—each holding 16 tons of iron ore—were hauled by a privately owned 4-6-4 tank locomotive—also 'Iron Duke'—from Cadia to exchange sidings at Spring Hill. From these exchange sidings, the same wagons were hauled by N.S.W.G.R., to Lithgow or—during part of 1928—Port Kembla. Locomotives could not be turned around at Cadia and ran in reverse for one leg of the round trip.

In 1921, there were four trains per day operating over the line. As well as the iron ore from Cadia, grain was loaded at the siding at Spring Terrace and wool elsewhere. The line also brought in coal for the powerhouse—presumably back loaded from Lithgow—and goods from Sydney for the town of Cadia and other sidings on the line. Trains could consist of both ore wagons and goods wagons. On at least one occasion, an excursion train carrying passengers ran over the line. Otherwise, if trains carried passengers, it was unofficially. There were at least three accidents on the line, two due to runaway wagons and one derailment of a locomotive.

=== First closure, wartime reopening, and final closure ===
Iron ore mining at Cadia ended, around time of the relocation of blast furnace operations from Lithgow to Port Kembla in late 1928, and the branch line also closed. There was insufficient other traffic on the line to justify the N.S.W. Government taking over the operation of the line. The line was abandoned but the rails remained in place. The locomotive 'Iron Duke' was sent to work at Port Kembla.

The line was remediated and reopened in 1941. A shortage of shipping, under wartime conditions, made it sensible to mine local sources of iron ore in New South Wales, rather than rely upon ore carried by sea from South Australia. Cadia was among the largest of these local iron ore deposits and the branch line allowed its ore to be transported to Port Kembla. During this second period of operation, all operations were carried out by the New South Wales Department of Railways. Cadia could not re-enter production immediately; the old aerial ropeway was beyond repair and a new, inclined, cable-hauled skipway and 15-miles of power lines had to be installed. Iron ore production at Cadia recommenced in late 1942.

Once mining of iron ore ceased around June 1945, the rail line closed in August 1945 and the tracks were lifted.

== Remnants ==
The formation of the old branch line is visible in places, including alongside the southern side of Forest Road near Spring Hill and is discernible in aerial views over most of its route.

Although the Cadia line has long closed, gold-copper concentrate from the modern-day Cadia-Ridgeway Mine is still shipped by rail from Blayney on the Main Western Line to Port Kembla, after being pumped as a slurry through a pipeline from the mine site at Cadia.

== See also ==
- Cadia, New South Wales
- Charles Hoskins
