= Newcrest Mining =

Australian-based mining company

Newcrest Mining Limited
- Company type: Subsidiary
- Industry: Resources
- Founded: 1921
- Headquarters: Melbourne, Australia
- Key people: Sherry Duhe (Managing director); Peter Tomsett (Chairman)
- Products: Gold
- Production output: 2.1 million ounces (2020–21)
- Parent: Newmont
- Website: www.newcrest.com

Newcrest Mining Limited is an Australian-based corporation which engages in the exploration, development, mining and sale of gold and the froth flotation product, gold-copper concentrate. It is Australia's leading gold mining company and its operations have expanded beyond Australia, for example Indonesia, thus becoming a prominent international mining corporation. Newmont initially started the company as a subsidiary in 1966. The subsidiary became Newmont Holdings Pvt Ltd in 1980 and in 1990 acquired 100 per cent of Australmin Holdings Limited taking the current name.

Newcrest's primary gold and copper production in Australia is at Cadia East Ridgeway (Cadia Valley Operations), the second Australian operation being the Telfer Mine in the Pilbara region of Western Australia. Newcrest also operates two mines in Papua New Guinea, Lihir and Hidden Valley, two mines in Canada, Red Chris and Brucejack. It previously operated in the Ivory Coast (Bonikro) and Indonesia (Gosowong). Past and present exploration has been carried out in the Americas, Asia and Europe.

In April 2010, Newcrest announced it was in merger talks with Lihir Gold, a move that would create the world's fifth-largest gold producer, with a combined production of 2.8 million ounces of gold in 2009. In August 2010, the deal was approved by Lihir shareholders (99.86%), and by the end of the month by the national court of Papua New Guinea (PNG), clearing the way for the deal. Under the deal worth US$9.45 billion, Newcrest will give Lihir shareholders 0.12 Newcrest shares, plus A$0.225 per Lihir share. As of 2015, Newcrest was the world's sixth-largest producer of gold. In November 2023 Newmont took over the company.

== Background ==
Newmont Mining Corporation was founded in 1921 in New York by Colonel William Thompson as a holding company to invest in worldwide mineral, oil, and relations companies. The Newmont name is an abbreviation of where Thompson lived and worked: New York and Montana. Newmont is now the world's second-largest gold producer. Newmont began an Australian subsidiary in 1966 and by 1971 they claimed to have discovered Telfer.

In 1980 the subsidiary became Newmont Holdings Pty Ltd and was based in Victoria, Australia. Seven years later it was listed on the Australian Stock Exchange as Newmont Australia Limited. When in 1990 the company acquired 100% of Australmin Holdings Ltd and 92% of BHP Gold Mines Ltd, it acquired its current company name.

Newcrest's primary focus was within Australia until 1991, when it commenced exploration overseas. Newcrest was determined to become a significant and internationally recognised gold mining and exploration company. The company established exploration offices and new companies offshore in Jakarta, Indonesia, and Chile, South America.

In 1992, exploration discovered its first offshore gold in the Halmahera Islands, Indonesia. And in 1996, Newcrest stated that the company wished to transform itself into a world-scale and internationally recognised producer. In 2002, years of exploration around Australia and overseas were paying dividends and the Newcrest group was capitalised at over $2 billion.

After restarting gold mining activities in Cracow, Queensland, in a 70:30 joint venture with Sedimentary Holdings in 2004, Newcrest sold its shares in this operation when Catalpa Resources, which had meanwhile acquired Sedimentary Holdings, merged with Conquest Mining in 2011 to form Evolution Mining.

In addition to its primary listing on the Australian Securities Exchange, Newcrest Mining stock was also traded on the Port Moresby Stock Exchange in Papua New Guinea (since 2010) and the Toronto Stock Exchange in Canada (2012–14 and since 2020).

== Industry development ==
The discovery of gold has been a major contributor to Australia's economy and infrastructure. Gold mining provided transportation, communication, road and rail and raw material for export around the colonies. This was especially prominent after 1851 in the Victorian goldfields. In the past, Australia has exported gold to the US and Europe; however, over time the traditional consumers have changed.

When alluvial gold deposits were exhausted in the 1800s, deeper mines were necessary. Working deep veins necessitated deep shafts, machinery and treatment plants, consequently this required investment. Individual miners were replaced by companies, employing dozens or even hundreds of men. Technology and mapping made gold exploration more accurate and efficient. Australia was seen to have very large mineral resources. This development, together with Australia's political stability, led to an influx of major overseas mining companies, such as Newmont, in the 1960s.

The emergence of Japan as a major buyer of minerals, combined with technological advances in ore separation, saw a shift in many mines from uneconomic production to sustainable production. By the mid-1980s, one of the few productive mining industries in Australian was gold mining because its price had been fixed since World War II.

Other factors lifted the production in gold, such as the development of the efficient carbon in pulp method for recovering very fine-grained and low-grade gold. It became feasible to mine entire zones of gold-bearing veins via open-cut or underground mining instead of only main veins.

In the 1990s, there was a period of consolidation with extensive focus on further improving efficiency and safety of operations and movement towards globalization; customers of minerals and metals became more diverse. During this period, the industry continued to be a major source of export income for the Australian economy, despite far-reaching changes in world mineral production and consumption patterns. India and China recently became the top importers of Australian gold because it continues to function extremely well as an inflation hedge. Furthermore, environmental and social concerns in relation to the mining industry have become global with the widespread uptake of new communication technologies.

From a corporate perspective, the Australian mining industry grew beyond being a large national sector into a world player. The industry is now diversified and integrated internationally through its exploration, mining and processing activities, and the supply of information technology, engineering, construction and other services. Annual surveys by the Minerals Council of Australia show that from the mid- to late 1990s, respondents spent over 40% of their total exploration budgets overseas.

The industry is also making a wide range of major investments in overseas mines and forging international marketing and processing alliances in regard to many minerals and metals. However, investment has also flowed in the other direction, with significant overseas investment in Australia for exploration and the development or expansion of mining and processing facilities.

== Operations ==
Newcrest's mining operations are located around Australia, Canada and Papua New Guinea.

The Telfer Mine is a large open-cut and underground mine in the Pilbara region of Western Australia. The mine has the potential to become the largest gold mine in Australia, with expected average production of 800,000 ounces (23,000 kg) of gold per year.

Ridgeway is a large underground gold and copper mine being developed by Newcrest. In its first full year of operation and metal production of 377,539 ounces (10,703.1 kg) of gold was in line with the plan. Development of the Cadia Hill mine in New South Wales began in 1996 and production began in 1998. It produces 298,848 ounces (8,472.2 kg) of gold per year.

Hidden Valley is an open-pit, gold-silver mine and processing plant in Morobe Province, Papua New Guinea. The mine is approximately 210 km north-north-west of Port Moresby, and 90 km south-south-west of Lae. It is operated by Morobe Mining Joint Ventures, a 50:50 joint venture between Harmony and Newcrest Mining.

Newcrest's second Papua New Guinea mine is the gold mine located on Lihir Island in the New Ireland Province of Papua New Guinea. It was acquired by taking over Lihir Gold in 2010 (see above).

Newcrest's headquarters are located in Melbourne, Australia since having been integrated with Sydney in 1995. Other offices are based at major mine sites to help communication between miners and the head office.

A majority of Newcrest's copper-gold concentrate is sold under long-term contract to smelters in Japan. Feed for the Saganoseki Smelter and Refinery is transported to Japan's southernmost island, Kyushu, and the concentrate is turned into 99.99% pure gold bullion which is sold to Asia's metal market. However, Newcrest also operates in the sale of concentrate to merchants who deliver the material to various regional smelters under their own contracts.

In August 2019, Newcrest acquired 70% of the Red Chris operation in a joint venture with Imperial Metals.

In November 2021 Newcrest agreed to acquire Pretium Resources Inc. for $14.87 a share, including 100% of the Brucejack operation. Brucejack adds a Tier 1 large-scale, long-life, low-cost mine to Newcrest's portfolio of Tier 1 assets.

Newcrest acquired Pretium Resources and the Brucejack operation on 9 March 2022.

In February 2023, Newmont made a $24.4 billion takeover offer for the company. It was rejected by the board of the company. In May 2023, the board accepted a revised $28.8 billion takeover offer. It was completed in November 2023 with Newcrest delisted from the Australian Securities Exchange.

== Criticism ==
The company has been accused of human rights violations and accelerating environmental damage particularly on Halmahera Island in Indonesia.
