= Cadia, New South Wales =

Cadia New South Wales
- Coordinates: 33°27′00″S 148°59′00″E
- Population: 3 (SAL 2021)
- Postcode(s): 2800
- Location: 20 km (12 mi) SW of Orange
- LGA(s): Cabonne Council
- State electorate(s): Orange
- Federal division(s): Calare

Cadia is a locality in the Cabonne Council of New South Wales, Australia. It was formerly a private township established c. 1860s by the Cadiangullong Consolidated Copper company, but now a ghost town. It is now part of the Cadia-Ridgeway Mine lease, operated by Newcrest. It had a population of zero as of the 2016 census.

== History ==
Wiradjuri people are the traditional owners of the land around Cadia, the area now known as the Cadia Valley.

In the 1860s, mines were opened on either side of Cadiangullong Creek, which flows through the valley into the Belubula River. Cadia developed on its eastern bank, near what became the main crossing of the creek, downstream of the confluence of Cadiangullong Creek with its tributary, Cadia Creek, formerly Rodd's Creek. The first phase of copper mining ended in 1868, resuming again at 'Iron Duke,' the hill also known as 'Big Cadia', between 1882 and 1898.

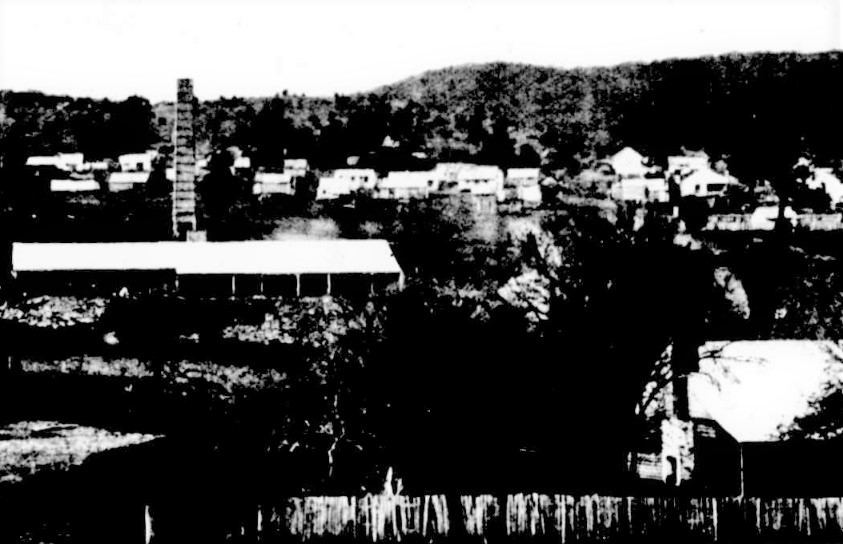
Cadia - Copper smelter with village in the background c.1907.

From around the start of new copper mining activity, in 1905, the centre of settlement at Cadia moved northward and uphill, toward the underground copper mine workings, at the location known 'Iron Duke', and closer to the road to Orange. Chillcott Street became its main street. From 1905 to 1917, 5,000 tons of copper metal were obtained from 100,000 tons of ore mined at Cadia.

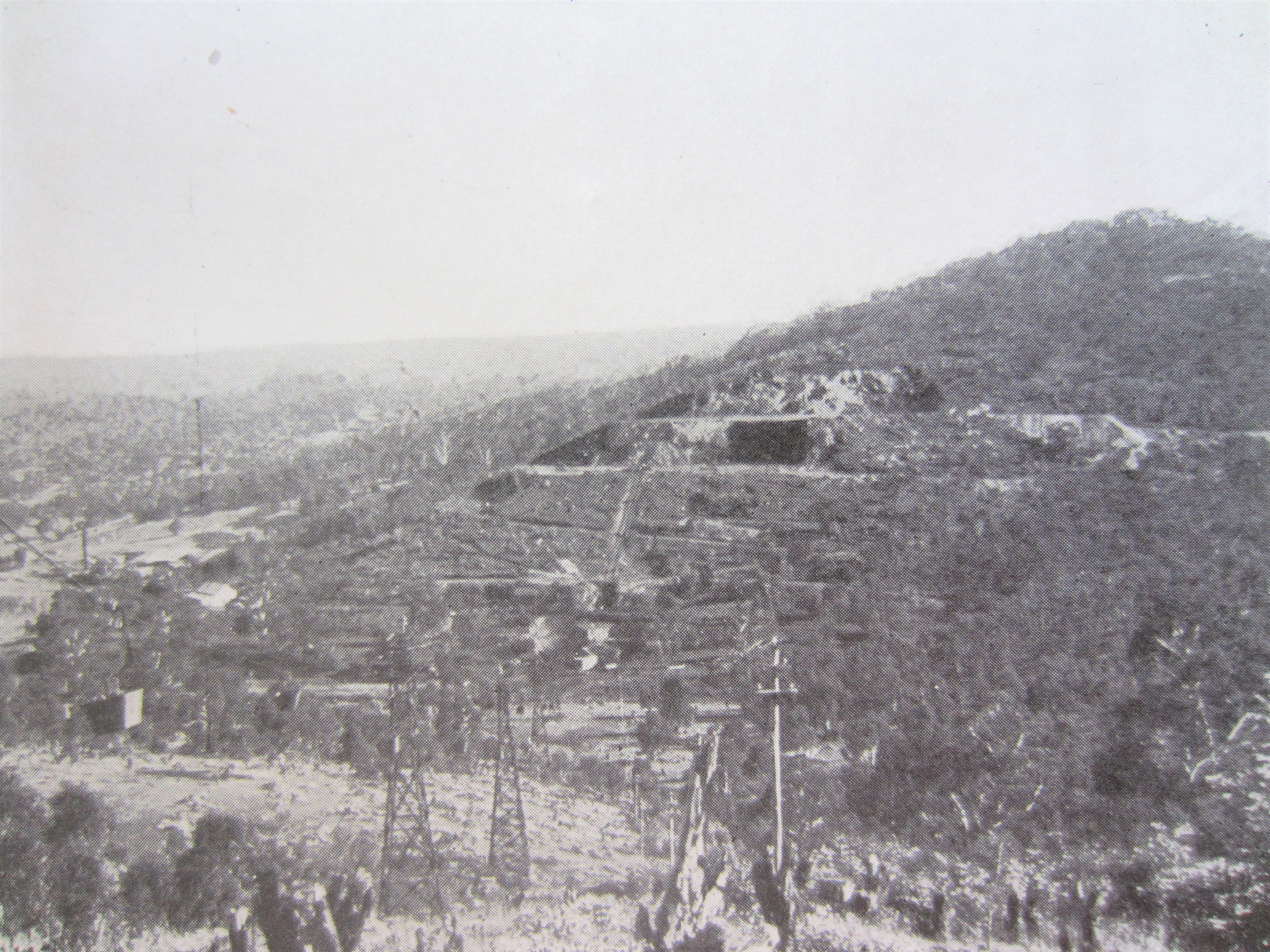
Cadia iron ore quarry operations c.1923. The quarry is on the hill. The incline tramway (centre) and aerial ropeway (left of centre at front) can be seen.

From 1918 to 1929, 1,682,000 tons of iron ore was mined at Cadia from a surface deposit at 'Iron Duke'. The ore was shipped over a privately operated railway branch line that joined the main line at Spring Hill. The railway line ended on the eastern side of the creek. Iron ore was carried downhill in skips via an inclined tramway, crushed in a steam-driven rock breaker, then transported across the valley by an aerial ropeway to bins, from where it was loaded into rail wagons and sent to Lithgow.

Working conditions in the quarry were poor, by today's standards. The iron ore mine was the site of a disastrous accident, on 10 March 1921, in which nine miners were killed as the result of the premature explosion of a blasting charge. Iron ore mining at Cadia ended soon after the relocation of blast furnace operations from Lithgow to Port Kembla in late 1928.

The 1920s saw the town at its greatest population and extent. In 1925, the population reached 300. Even in what would be its heyday, Cadia was a primitive and rough little town. An observer, in 1926, described it as follows, "The present buildings in Cadia seem to have been thrown down—or thrown up—in any way in any direction. The main street appears to be the only one with any alignment at all, but it is nothing but a switchback to pass over, deep ruts running across it at regular yard intervals. The hotel is the only impressive looking building in the place, it being a neat-looking wooden structure. There are four stores, mostly built of wood in front, with galvanized-iron sides and roofs. There is also a butcher's shop and several boardinghouses", and "The residences principally are composed of saplings, to which are nailed bags of all descriptions, these being painted over and forming, it is said, a most complete barrier to the elements, and the floors earth. The post office is one of the sights of the place. It is constructed of galvanized-iron, attached to rough saplings, and its dimensions are about 10 ft square. The same place is used as a telegraph, telephone and savings bank office. The town boasts a public school, two churches, police station and well-situated and well laid-out sports oval."

During excavation for the terminal of the ore ropeway, a permanent spring was uncovered, and tanks were constructed to provide a water supply, avoiding the necessity to pump water to the village from the creek below. The discovery of the spring was a godsend; the village's waste polluted the same creek, as there were no "sanitary arrangements" in Cadia, even by 1926.

In February 1928, another observer described Cadia as follows, "The town itself possesses scarcely half a dozen decent buildings. Most of the dwellings are built of iron, tins, hessian, and similar materials, and almost every place is a 'boarding-house,' where the food as a rule is as rough as the language of the boarders." The rest of the town consisted of, "The hotel, a couple of small stores, and a rickety tin post office ... not forgetting, of course, the two corrugated iron churches." Across the creek were the school and teacher's house, "whose beautiful flower garden forms the one bright spot in Cadia." Further along the creek, was the police house; "The solitary constable Is reinforced every pay week-end by a colleague from Millthorpe." The same observer concluded that Cadia was, "a rough place to look at and a still rougher place to work at."

Once the iron mine closed, around November 1928, its decline was rapid. The railway closed immediately. Cadia lost it police presence by January 1929. Cadia Public School, which had opened in December 1865, closed in May 1930. Cadia Post Office, which opened on 1 August 1864, closed on 29 March 1935. By 1940, just the old school building and two residences survived.

When the 'Iron Duke' iron ore mine was re-opened in late 1942, during World War II, new staff housing had to be built and a temporary 'tent city' established for the workers. In 1945, mining ceased and Cadia was abandoned. Cadia Public School, which had reopened in January 1943, closed permanently in May 1945. In June 1945, forty buildings at the site were auctioned. All buildings in Cadia subsequently were removed or destroyed; the entire village reverted to paddocks. Old Cadia Road still follows the alignment of Chilcott Street, the old main street.

Although mining had taken place in the vicinity for well over a century, it was not until 1992 that the porphyry gold-copper potential of the district was recognised by geologists of Newcrest. Enormous tonnages of ore-grade mineralisation were identified, resulting in the huge open-cut mine and two nearby underground mines now in operation.

The enormous scale of the modern mines has led to the relocation of some artifacts of Cadia's history and cultural heritage, including a scarred tree and the former village's cemetery.

== Heritage listings ==
Cadia has a number of heritage-listed sites, including:

- Cadia Engine House

== See also ==
- Cadia Mine railway line
- Cadia-Ridgeway Mine
