= Cadia-Ridgeway mine =

Mines in New South Wales, Australia

Cadia
- Location in Australia

Location
- Location: Cadia, New South Wales, Australia; 33°28′01″S 148°59′35″E

Production
- Products: Copper; Gold
- Production: Copper: 85,000 tonnes Gold: 561,000 ounces
- Financial year: 2021–22

History
- Opened: 1998
- Closed: 2030+ (forecast)

Owner
- Company: Newcrest
- Website: www.newcrest.com

Cadia Mine is a series of large underground and open-cut gold and copper mines located in the Cadia Valley, - about 20 kilometers south of regional city, Orange - in New South Wales, Australia.

The mine has been expanded since 1990s, and has become a major employer within the region, having an expected lifespan of several decades. Cadia is the second largest open cut mine in Australia, after the Super Pit in Kalgoorlie, Western Australia.

Large mineral deposits have recently been uncovered at the site's two underground mines - the newly-developed Ridgeway mine, and Cadia East mines - adjacent to the Cadia Open-Cut Mine.

The mine is currently operated by Newmont.

== Water and power supply ==
Following prolonged regional drought, in May 2007, former operator, Newcrest, approached Orange City Council requesting the use of town water supply due to the likelihood of adverse affects on future production at the Cadia mine. The Council agreed to allow Newmont initial access to the Gosling Creek Reservoir, then, if necessary, from Lake Canobolas; however, the two primary water stores for the city of Orange - Suma Park Dam and Spring Creek Reservoir - would not be used. Neighbouring council for Cabonne Shire later offered water supply from a disused quarry on Icely Road, east of Orange.

In July 2009, another water rights dispute - still before the local courts (?) - between Orange City Council and Newcrest emerged over the current rights to the town's treated effluent water, which Cadia had accessed, free of charge, since beginning its modern operations in the late 1990s. Orange City Council has argued that Newcrest - now Newmont - has since breached its original agreement due to recent expansion and development of the Cadia East and Ridgeway Deeps projects, and should be financially liable to the council for treated effluent water.

In 2021, Newcrest contracted 55% (about 650 GWh/year) of the Rye Park 396 MW wind farm to supply part of its power for 15 years. The contract started in 2025.

== Automation ==
The Cadia operation is a pioneer within underground block cave mining. In collaboration with Epiroc, the mine has developed an autonomous production level in Panel Cave 1 where Deep Automation is used to orchestrate multiple Scooptram ST18 underground loaders as well as auxiliary equipment such as rock breakers and MacLean water cannons.

== Union involvement ==
Employees at the Cadia-Ridgeway Mine are represented by the Australian Workers Union (AWU), and employed under the enterprise agreement, "Cadia Valley Operations Enterprise Agreement 2012" - approved by Fair Work Australia on 23 November 2012, and expiring on 15 November 2016. The Australian Workers Union were nominated as bargaining representative for the agreement - the first agreement made between AWU and Newcrest at the Cadia-Ridgeway Mine.

== Work stoppages ==
=== Earthquake interruptions ===
In March 2012, production was stopped at the mine following the partial collapse of a wall retaining one of the tailings dams. Tailings were retained in the adjacent dam, but production was halted pending a solution to disposal or storage of future tailings. It was reported that it could take one to six months to put in place an alternative. A magnitude 2.7 earthquake had been recorded in the area the day before cracks were noticed in the wall. The mine had also been closed for 3 months in 2017 due to earthquake damage. The company subsequently obtained a permit from the N.S.W. Government to use the old Cadia Hill open cut pit for tailings storage and commenced to do so during 2018.

=== Ground water ===
On 22 July 2022, water from an aquifer entering a ventilation shaft caused all underground production to cease while visual and other examinations were undertaken. Underground production was affected for several weeks. Processing of ore stored above ground was continued.

== Environmental issues ==
In 2023, Cadia Holdings Ltd was convicted and fined a total of $350,000 by the New South Wales Environmental Protection Authority (EPA) for three offences relating to breaches of clean air regulations in November 2021, March 2022, and May 2023. EPA testing had shown the mine was emitting 11 times the legal limit of dust containing heavy metals.

In February 2026, a class-action lawsuit was filed by local residents alleging contamination of over 2,000 nearby properties with arsenic, heavy metals, and other chemicals emitted from the mine.
