= Ashton, Elizabeth Bay =

Ashton
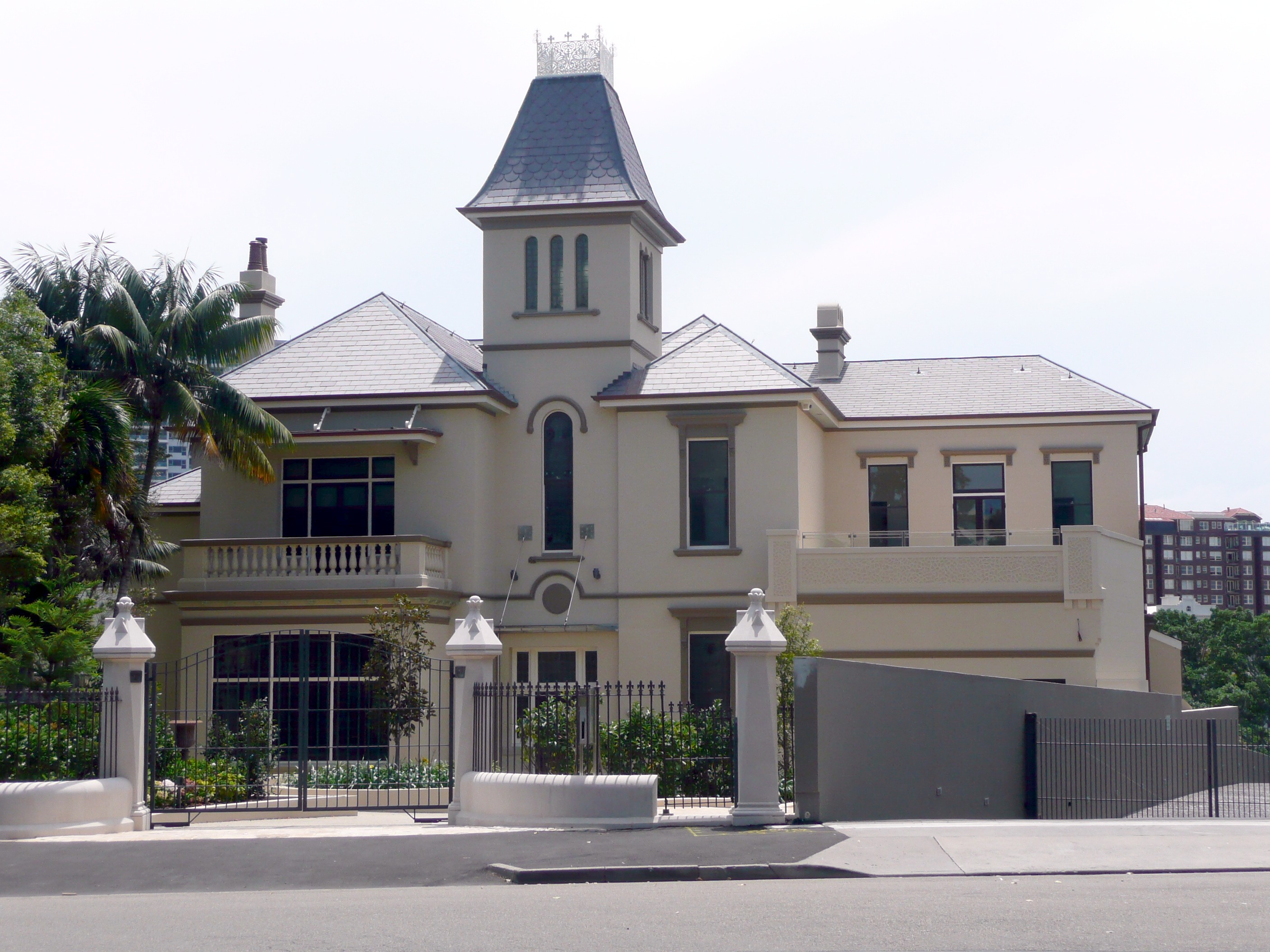

- Location within Sydney Location within Australia
- 33.8711°S 151.2297°E
- Location: 102 Elizabeth Bay Road, Elizabeth Bay, City of Sydney, New South Wales, Australia

History
- Built: 1874–1875

Site notes
- Architect: Thomas Rowe

New South Wales Heritage Register
- Official name: Ashton and its grounds; Caprera (c.1875–c.1910); Brema or Braemar (c.1910–c.1920); The German Consulate^{a}
- Type: State heritage (built)
- Designated: 19 November 2003
- Reference no.: 1684
- Type: Mansion
- Category: Residential buildings (private)

Ashton is a heritage-listed mansion located at 102 Elizabeth Bay Road in the inner eastern Sydney suburb of Elizabeth Bay, New South Wales, Australia. It was designed by Thomas Rowe and built from 1874 to 1875. It is also known as Ashton and its grounds and Caprera (c.1875–c.1910); Brema or Braemar (c.1910–c.1920); The German Consulate.^{a} The property is privately owned. It was added to the New South Wales State Heritage Register on 19 November 2003.

== History ==
Elizabeth Bay had been the site of a fishing village established by Governor Macquarie in c. 1815 for a composite group of Cadigal people under the leadership of Bungaree (d.1830). Elizabeth Bay had been named in honour of Elizabeth Macquarie. Sir Thomas Brisbane, Governor 1821–25, designated Elizabeth Bay as the site of an asylum for the insane. Governor Darling granted Colonial Secretary Alexander Macleay 22 hectares (54 acres) at Elizabeth Bay in 1826. From 1826 to 1926 the subject land was part of Macleay's estate, in which he built his mansion in the 1830s to the west. Built well before the house, the estate was widely considered at the time (1820s on) as "the finest house and garden in the colony". Its wood walks bordered the estate on its eastern side (and later the site of Ashton).

== Description ==
Ashton comprises a two-storey, late Victorian Italianate harbour side villa in its original grounds. The property addresses Elizabeth Bay, Elizabeth Bay Road and The Esplanade. It features a prominent tower visible from both Elizabeth Bay Road and Beare Park and is known as a local landmark. The house has been extended and renovated a number of times but still retains many of its original Victorian features and details. Many of these additions are significant in themselves due to their association with particular historic occupants of the place. The original section of the house is of rendered brick with struck courses built on a basement podium of sandstone ashlar. Later additions are of rendered brick with struck courses well matched to the original building. Roofs are generally slate. Basement floor is a recent concrete slab with upper floors of timber. The masonry tower features a distinctive, steep pitched roof with cast iron cresting. Joinery throughout appears to be cedar with very recent modifications of undetermined timber.

An associated 1920s building on the site, Esplanade Cottage, was demolished without authorisation some time after 1999. Its footings and remnant walls and landscape remain in situ. This building addressed The Esplanade. The grounds contain nineteenth-century sandstone walling and garden terracing, with views across Beare Park to Sydney Harbour. The front garden and carriage loop facing Elizabeth Bay has been modified but retains some original plantings, including curly palm (Howea belmoreana), Lord Howe Island palm (H. fosteriana).

=== Condition ===
As at 17 December 2003, the house is currently in poor condition due to extensive roof damage in the 1999 hail storms and subsequent neglect. The upper floor ceilings are generally lost but representative ground floor ceilings remain. Most joinery is intact in situ or labelled and stored on site. Most chimney pieces remain in situ. The fabric retains evidence of earlier uses, services and finishes. Recent unauthorised works and demolitions do not preclude a high quality conservation of the place.

An associated building on the site, Esplanade Cottage, was demolished without authorisation some time after 1999. Its footings and remnant walls and landscape remain in situ.

Many of the early twentieth century additions to the Rowe's original build of the house are generally related to significant occupants and so contribute to the overall significance of the item. A lack of maintenance in the second half of the twentieth century and unauthorised works post 1999 have left the fabric in poor condition but structurally sound. Sufficient original fabric, site and documentary evidence survives to facilitate conservation and interpretation of the place.

=== Modifications and dates ===
The following periods correspond to the different names given to the house by its different owners as revealed by documentary research.

==== Caprera Period (CP) 1871–1902 ====
This represents the original house built and lived in by Thomas Rowe after he moved from Tresco before 1875. A photograph dated 1885 shows that no additions had been built to the northern or southern sides of the house, apart from a narrow awning at basement level on the south and a small gabled porch at ground floor level on the north. The outline of the house including these minor structures is shown on the 1908 survey along with stables on the western boundary. This plan indicates that immediately to the north of the front door there may have been a verandah or porch. Caprera was described in 1891 as "three storey" indicating that the current basement level was inhabited. It seems likely that the basement level housed the kitchen and servants quarters.

==== Braemar Period (BP) 1903–1921 ====
After Thomas Rowe's death in 1899 the property was rented to various tenants including G. H. Boner. Later it was purchased by Boner, who applied to carry out building works in 1908. It is possible this work included the single storey extension to the south west corner of the house and the two storey extension to the north of the front door and tower. F. A. Lohmann purchased the property in 1909 and it became known as Braemar during this period of German influence.

==== Ashton Phase 1 (AP1) 1921–1929 ====
After being confiscated from German ownership at the end of World War I the house was purchased and occupied by Charles Henry Hoskins, proprietor of the Hoskins Iron and Steel Company. Hoskins introduced the name Ashton for the place. He added to the northern end of the house, built two motor garages and a separate cottage to replace the stables and probably built the bay window addition to the library and balcony over. The cast iron detailing of the rear first floor balcony was replaced in timber probably at this time. The ground floor room behind the garage may have been the chauffeur quarters or might have accommodated the kitchen relocated from the basement to a more convenient location.

==== Ashton Phase 2 (AP2) 1929–1936 ====
Following the death of Charles Hoskins, Ashton was sold to Leslie Scandrett who added the first floor bathroom to the main bedroom at the south west corner of the house. The Water Board survey from 1934 shows that the large arcaded verandah on the garden front had been added by this time.

==== Ashton Phase 3 (AP3) 1937–2002 ====
Very little was added to the house in this period, although the cottage on the western boundary had been extended by 1954 and the land was subdivided into two lots, although retained under a single ownership. The cottage was demolished and the house has suffered storm damage and deterioration due to lack of maintenance. The surrounding development changed considerably in the last period. The enclave of six similar sized villas designed by Thomas Rowe were reduced to three (Ashton, Tresco and Kincoppal) and multi-story flat buildings have been constructed on either side of Ashton.

== Heritage listing ==
As at 1 October 2003, Ashton represents a rare and intact example of a Victorian Italianate villa in its original grounds situated on the Sydney Harbour waterfront, dating from 1875. Designed by the architect Thomas Rowe as his family home, the house and grounds are a fine example of the major domestic work of this prominent 19th Century architect. Ashton is rare in the State as one of the small group of surviving major domestic works attributed to Thomas Rowe, together with Tresco, Kincoppal, and Heathcote Hall. The building retains its distinctive exterior and interior features and the grounds retain important landscape elements, which contribute to the surrounding landscape and relate the property with the other surviving villas of Thomas Rowe. The visual link between the house and Elizabeth Bay that dictated its original siting survives. The house and grounds are a prominent landmark in the locality, visible from Elizabeth Bay, Elizabeth Point, Elizabeth Bay Road, the Esplanade, and other waterfront properties.

The house and grounds demonstrate the evolution of the culture, taste, lifestyle and affluence of Sydney's professional and mercantile elite over the period of 1875–1942. Eminent former owners include Thomas Rowe, John Grafton Ross, Charles Henry Hoskins and Sir Cecil Harold Hoskins, who were important figures in the development of Australian architecture and industry, including CSR (Ross), Australasian Gaslight Company (Ross), Australian General Insurance (Ross), Hoskins Iron and Steel Co. (Charles Hoskins), and BHP (Cecil Hoskins). The grandeur, quality, style and situation of the house and grounds provide evidence of the affluence and importance of these figures in Australian architecture and industry.

Historically, the property represents one of only two, surviving, intact first-generation subdivisions of the original Macleay Estate, illustrating the first-generation residential development of Elizabeth Point.

Ashton was listed on the New South Wales State Heritage Register on 19 November 2003 having satisfied the following criteria.

The place is important in demonstrating the course, or pattern, of cultural or natural history in New South Wales.

Ashton demonstrates the first-generation subdivision patterns and residential development at Elizabeth Point. It represents one of only two intact, surviving, first generation subdivisions of the original Macleay family Estate, which was subdivided by the Macleay family from the 1840s. Its original allotment boundaries are still legible and under one ownership, despite subdivision into two lots.

The house and grounds provide evidence of the development of Australian architecture during the 19th Century, as a fine example of a Victorian Italianate villa on Sydney Harbour designed by the prominent architect of this era, Thomas Rowe.

The place has a strong or special association with a person, or group of persons, of importance of cultural or natural history of New South Wales's history.

Ashton is significant for its association with eminent former owners including Thomas Rowe, Joseph Ross, and the Hoskins family who were major steel manufacturers and associated with the development of BHP. The grandeur, quality, style and situation of the house and grounds demonstrates the professional and economic standing of these figures achieved by the time of their residency in Ashton and their importance in the development of Australian architecture or industry.

Designed by the architect Thomas Rowe as his family home (after Tresco), the house and grounds of Ashton also provide evidence of the architectural accomplishments, personal tastes, lifestyle, and economic and social position of this prominent 19th Century architect during the 1870s. Rowe's architectural practice became one of the largest and most important architectural practices of the nineteenth century, with work in Bathurst, Orange, Goulburn, Newcastle and Brisbane as well as Sydney. He became well known for his commercial buildings, arcades, churches and large private residences. Rowe was a founder of the Institute of Architects in 1871, and served as its president in 1876–1889 and 1895–1897. He was an alderman on the Sydney City Council in 1872–1876 and the first mayor of Manly in 1877. He was also a first lieutenant in the Engineer Corps in 1872 and lieut-colonel in 1886, hence the name "Colonel". He lost his fortune in the 1893 depression and died almost penniless in his house, "Mona" in Darling Point in January 1899.

The first known following resident of Ashton was Joseph Grafton Ross, company director and son-in-law of newspaper proprietor, John Fairfax. He was chairman and director of various companies, including CSR, Australasian Gaslight Company, Mercantile Bank of Sydney, Australian General Assurance Co, helped establish the Prince Alfred Hospital, and served on many committees for charitable organisations.

Oskar Plate was a wealthy and prominent member of Sydney's German born community at the beginning of WWI. As the Sydney-based agent for the Norddeutscher Lloyd Steamship Company, Mr Plate fell into a small category of men targeted by the government for internment and eventual deportation as a means of ensuring that "enemy firms" which had been ordered closed by the Commonwealth could not reopen once the war had ended. He was interned during the war after a campaign by the tabloid media of the time and was deported in 1919. Ashton was subsequently impounded by the state

Ashton was later owned by the prominent steel manufacturer, Charles Henry Hoskins and his family between 1920 and 1929, including his son Cecil Harold Hoskins (later Sir). G and C Hoskins Ltd (later, Hoskins Iron and Steel Co Ltd, then Australian Iron and Steel Ltd) supplied and laid the pipes for the Sydney water supply and later shared the contract to supply to 350 miles of pipe for the Perth to Coolgardie water supply. In 1907 the company took over the Lithgow Ironworks and became a major competitor of BHP. The company built an integrated steelworks at Port Kembla, near Wollongong, in 1928 it merged with Baldwins of England, and in 1935 became a subsidiary of BHP with Cecil Hoskins remaining the General Manager of AIS, and later, director until 1959. Charles Hoskins was an avid car enthusiast, which explains the addition of two motor garages at Ashton in 1921 and 1923. Charles Hoskins died at Ashton in February 1926 and his widow, Emily, continued to live at Ashton until her death in 1928.

The place is important in demonstrating aesthetic characteristics and/or a high degree of creative or technical achievement in New South Wales.

Constructed in 1875, Ashton is a fine example of a Victorian Italianate harbourside villa in its original setting. Such villas, once common around Sydney Harbour, are now rare. The villa has survived relatively intact with a number of additions and is structurally sound, although currently in a poor state of repair from hail damage in 1999 and subsequent neglect. Ashton represents a rare example of Thomas Rowe's major domestic work, forming one of the small group of surviving major domestic works attributed to Thomas Rowe, including Tresco (the earlier home of Rowe), Kincoppal and Heathcote Hall. It demonstrates the careful control by Rowe of the overall character of the streetscape and vistas to, and from, the buildings. It is a prominent landmark in the locality, visible from Elizabeth Bay, Elizabeth Point, Elizabeth Bay Road, the Esplanade, and other waterfront properties.

Ashton has aesthetic significance for the picturesque massing and exterior decoration of elements such as the tower with its steep slate roof and cast iron cresting. It features some unusual and distinctive interior features such as the staircase and moulded cedar architraves and retains its original iron palisade fence and gate piers onto Elizabeth Bay Road. Ashton retains its large garden with lawn terrace, sandstone walling and steps facing Beare Park and the harbour. Later additions to the building, such as those built by Charles Hoskins, contribute to the aesthetic and historic significance of the item. Ashton and its grounds make an important contribution to the surviving historical landscape and character of Beare Park and Elizabeth Point.

The sandstone walling and terracing at Ashton is likely to be the work of Italian stonemasons employed by Thomas Rowe for his own garden at Tresco and for the other villas he designed and built at Elizabeth Point in the 1860s and 1870s. In this, the surviving garden stonework forms a significant group with other sandstone remnants surviving in the grounds of Tresco and Kincoppal, the other villas designed by Thomas Rowe at Elizabeth Point. The property retains its views into and out from the house, which are significant as the house was intentionally sited to take advantage of the outlook across Elizabeth Bay.

The place has a strong or special association with a particular community or cultural group in New South Wales for social, cultural or spiritual reasons.

Ashton is likely to retain meaning for previous residents including members of the Rowe and Hoskins families, and other families who lived in the house. Ashton is a well-known landmark in the community, contributing to the community sense of place. Regard for Ashton has been indicated by the number of concerned submissions from the community and elected representatives regarding the conservation, disrepair and sale of the property. Community memory of the occupation of the house by German merchants during the 1920s appears to persist in the apparently mistaken belief amongst many locals that the place was once the German Consulate. This local folklore may indicate a high level of community interest in the place. Community esteem is also indicated by its inclusion in the South Sydney Council LEP as a heritage item.

The place has potential to yield information that will contribute to an understanding of the cultural or natural history of New South Wales.

Ashton lies within the grounds of the former Macleay Estate, although it appears to be located outside of the documented extent of Alexander Macleay's landscaped gardens. Maps of the Macleay Estate do not indicate the presence of any early paths or structures in the area around Elizabeth Point. With the upheaval of the site for the building of the house and the garden terracing, it is unlikely that evidence of either Aboriginal occupation or early European occupation survive on the site. Identified archaeological potential on the site dates from the era of the present house and grounds, including the foundations of the 1920s Esplanade Cottage that was formerly located on the lower terrace.

The place possesses uncommon, rare or endangered aspects of the cultural or natural history of New South Wales.

Ashton is rare on the Sydney Harbour waterfront as a surviving example of a Victorian Italianate maritime villa in its original setting. The property is rare in Elizabeth Bay as one of two intact surviving first generation subdivisions of the original Macleay Estate. It is rare in the State as one of the small group of surviving major domestic works attributed to Thomas Rowe, together with Tresco (1869), Kincoppal (c.1869) and Heathcote Hall (1887). The fabric of the house retains some rare evidence of domestic taste and household management as it was not subject to major extension or refurbishment after 1942.

The place is important in demonstrating the principal characteristics of a class of cultural or natural places/environments in New South Wales.

Ashton and its setting is representative of the evolution of the culture, taste, lifestyle and affluence of Sydney's professional and mercantile elite over the period 1875–1942. The house and grounds represent a fine example of a late nineteenth century waterfront mansion designed in the Victorian Italianate style, and represent the first generation residential subdivision and development of Elizabeth Point.

== See also ==
- Australian residential architectural styles

== Notes ==
^a: Popular local name; not supported up by historical research.
