= Edgerley, Elizabeth Bay =

Edgerley
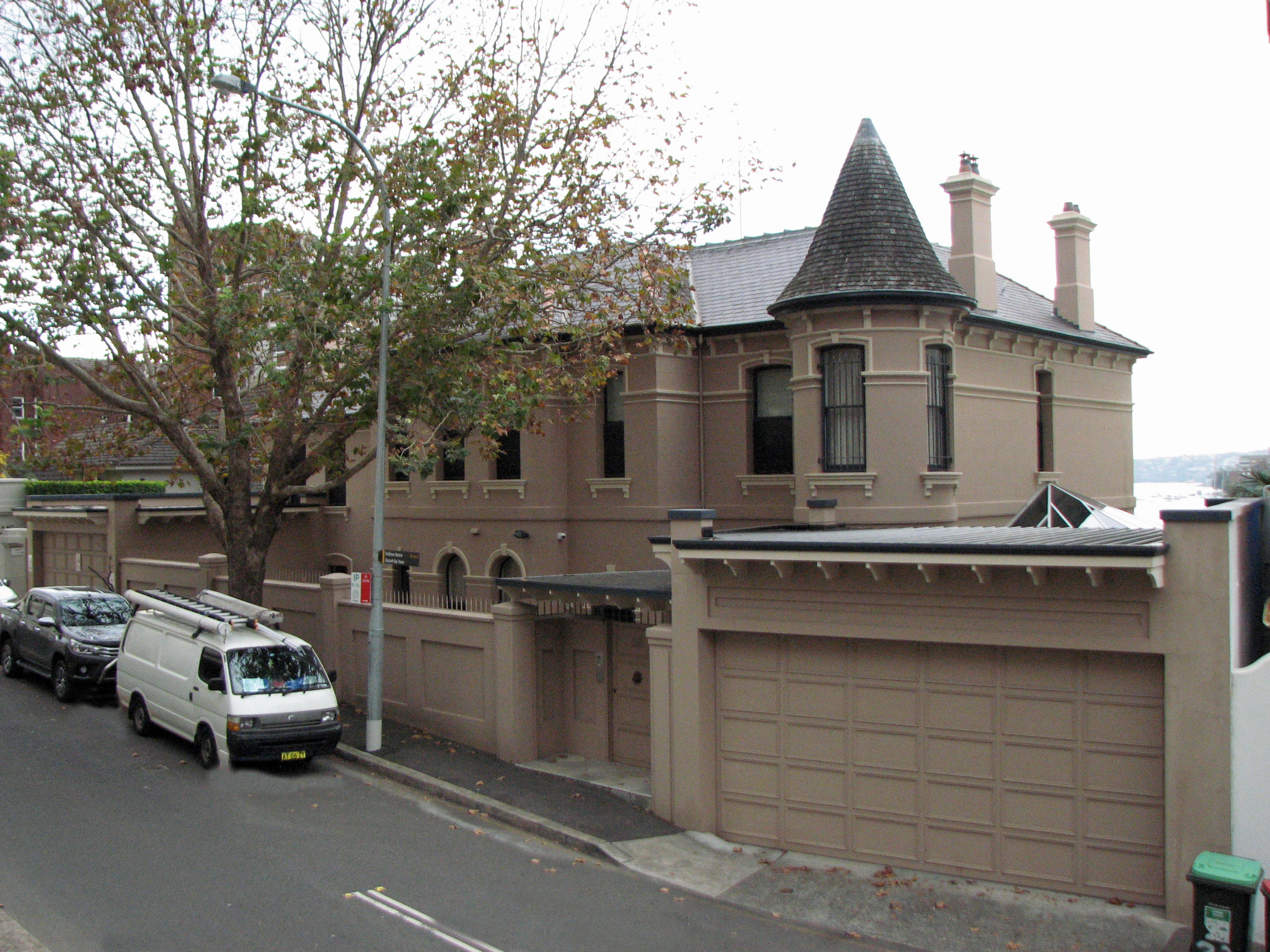
- Edgerley, 18 Billyard Ave, Elizabeth Bay

- Location within Sydney Location within Australia
- 33.8692°S 151.2272°E
- Location: 18–18a Billyard Avenue, Elizabeth Bay, City of Sydney, New South Wales, Australia

History
- Built: 1885

Site notes
- Owner: Paspaley Pearls Properties P/L

New South Wales Heritage Register
- Official name: Edgerley; Ramona; Haughly
- Type: State heritage (complex / group)
- Designated: 2 April 1999
- Reference no.: 671
- Type: House
- Category: Residential buildings (private)
- Builders: David Peter Dickson

Edgerley is a heritage-listed residence located at 18–18a Billyard Avenue in the inner eastern Sydney suburb of Elizabeth Bay, New South Wales, Australia. It is also known as Ramona; Haughly. The property is owned by interests associated with the Paspaley family. It was added to the New South Wales State Heritage Register on 2 April 1999.

== History ==
=== Colonial settlement ===
Elizabeth Bay had been the site of a fishing village established by Governor Macquarie (1810–21) in c.1815 for a composite group of Cadigal people – the indigenous inhabitants of the area surrounding Sydney Harbour – under the leadership of Bungaree (d.1830). Elizabeth Bay had been named in honour of Mrs Macquarie. Bungaree's group continued their nomadic life around the harbour foreshores. Sir Thomas Brisbane, Governor 1821–25, designated Elizabeth Bay as site of an asylum for the insane. A pen sketch by Edward Mason from 1822 to 1823 shows a series of bark huts for the natives in the locality.

Governor Darling granted Colonial Secretary Alexander Macleay 22 hectares (54 acres) at Elizabeth Bay in 1826. Macleay's estate was developed well before the mansion (built in the 1830s to the south-west). The estate was widely considered at the time (1820s on) as "the finest house and garden in the colony". Its shrubbery below (north and north-east of the house) was where Edgerley was subdivided off and developed. After Alexander's bankruptcy his son George subdivided and sold leaseholds between 1841 and 1882. Billyard Avenue was formed to access some of the earliest allotments.

The house now known as Ramona at 18 Billyard Avenue, Elizabeth Bay was previously named Haughly (prior to 1926) and Edgerley (1926 until about 1990). It stands upon land identified as Lot 1, Deposited Plan 75455. The property consists of earthen terraces which descend from a high point on Billyard Ave to an area of reclaimed foreshore land granted by the Crown in 1909. Lot 1 was formerly identified as the majority of lot 38 and part of lot 37 of the third subdivision of the Elizabeth Bay Estate put up for 99-year leasehold at auction in July 1882.

- 1882 – Subdivision of part of the Macleay Estate.
- 1885 – Construction of house known as Haughly by David Peter Dickson.
- 1887 – Construction of seawall and foreshore reclamation
- 1893–96 – The Hon. F. B. Suttor, pastoralist and politician of note resided at Haughly
- 1900–04 – Gregory Walker, Supreme Court Judge lived at Haughly
- 1926 – Haughly purchased by Myra Johnson, and renamed Edgerley
- 1930 – Plans lodged for changes to flats or boarding house rooms for separate occupancy including introduction of additional bathrooms.
- 1930s – Poet Kenneth Slessor was a tenant in the house for a time.
- The existing garage at the southwestern corner is a greatly modified version of an earlier garage that is known to have existed in 1952, and may date back to the 1920s.
- 1979 – Property given "Recorded" listing in National Trust of Australia (NSW) Register.
- 1984 – The Uniting Church in Australia Property Trust (NSW) registered proprietors
- The existing single garage attached to the northern side of the house was built after 1985
- 1984 – Intention to demolish the building.
- 1986 – Interim Conservation order placed over the property.
- 1986 – Heritage Council of NSW deferred consideration of alterations and additions and requested a Conservation Plan.
- 1986 – Conservation report prepared by Helen Proudfoot and Joy Hughes.
- The existing landscaping in the forecourt area was introduced in relatively recent times

Ramona is possibly the last remaining single-family dwelling in this portion of Billyard Avenue. The original setting has, to a large extent, been compromised by subsequent higher density development comprising apartment blocks and converted grand houses.

== Description ==
Site

Edgerley (a.k.a. Ramona) stands upon land identified as Lot 1, Deposited Plan 75455. The property consists of earthen terraces which descend from a high point on Billyard Ave to an area of reclaimed foreshore land granted by the Crown in 1909. Lot 1 was formerly identified as the majority of lot 38 and part of lot 37 of the third subdivision of the Elizabeth Bay Estate put up for 99 year leasehold at auction in July 1882. Ramona is possibly the last remaining single-family dwelling in this portion of Billyard Avenue. It is a grand house with particularly fine harbour views. The original setting has, to a large extent, been compromised by subsequent higher density development comprising apartment blocks and converted grand houses. The existing landscaping in the forecourt area was introduced in relatively recent times.

== Heritage listing ==
As at 24 April 2009, Edgerley is a significant example of a large, late Victorian residence. The interior contains fine examples of cedar joinery including a staircase, fireplace surrounds as well as leadlight windows. The gardens are significant for the rare example of mature palms and ferns. Edgerley is also significant through its association with eminent poet, Kenneth Slessor, who lived there for a period in the 1930s.

Edgerley was listed on the New South Wales State Heritage Register on 2 April 1999.

== See also ==
- Australian residential architectural styles
