= Thomas Rowe =

Australian architect and politician (1829–1899)

Colonel Thomas Rowe VD, JP, FRIBA
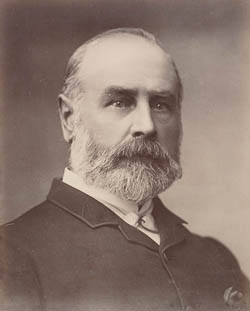

1st Mayor of Manly
- In office 15 February 1877 – 7 February 1879
- Succeeded by: Alfred Hilder

Alderman of the Municipality of Manly
- In office 13 February 1877 – 1 October 1880
- Succeeded by: James Boscawen Duff

Alderman of the City of Sydney for Bourke Ward
- In office 2 December 1872 – 30 November 1876
- Preceded by: Joseph Raphael
- Succeeded by: John Young

1st President of the Board of Water Supply and Sewerage
- In office 26 March 1888 – 24 March 1892
- Preceded by: New office
- Succeeded by: Cecil West Darley

President of the Metropolitan Board of Water Supply and Sewerage
- In office 20 March 1896 – 14 January 1899
- Preceded by: Cecil West Darley
- Succeeded by: Jacob Garrard

Official Member of the Metropolitan Board of Water Supply and Sewerage
- In office 26 March 1888 – 14 January 1899
- Preceded by: New office
- Succeeded by: Jacob Garrard

Personal details
- Born: 20 July 1829 Penzance, Cornwall, England
- Died: 14 January 1899 (aged 69) Darling Point, Colony of New South Wales
- Occupation: Architect

Military service
- Allegiance: United Kingdom
- Branch/service: New South Wales Defence Force
- Years of service: 1872–1899
- Rank: Colonel
- Commands: New South Wales Corps of Engineers
- Awards: Volunteer Officers' Decoration

Thomas Rowe, VD, JP, FRIBA (20 July 1829 – 14 January 1899) was a British-born architect, builder, and goldminer who became one of the leading Australian architects of the Victorian era. He was also a politician, who was the first Mayor of Manly, north of Sydney.

== Early life and education ==
Thomas Rowe was born in Penzance, Cornwall, England, on 20 July 1829, the eldest son of Richard Rowe and Ursula Mumford.

He attended Barnes Academy in Penzance. At 15 he became a draftsman in his father's building business, before the family emigrated to the colony of New South Wales in 1848.

== Career ==
=== Architectural career ===
From 1857 he practised as an architect in Sydney, Bathurst, Orange, Newcastle and Goulburn. As an architect he was often successful in competitions, and his firms built commercial premises, large houses and many Methodist churches.

His architectural partners over the years included W. B. Field, Sydney Green, and Alfred Spain. Spain was articled to Rowe's practice of Rowe & Green in 1884, when he commenced his studies at Sydney Technical College.

Spain became a partner in Rowe, Campbell & Spain in 1893, which became Rowe & Spain in 1895, which continued until Rowe's death in 1899.

=== Political career ===
In 1872, he was elected alderman for Bourke Ward of the Sydney City Council, which he held until 1876. During his time on the council he worked on sanitation efforts related to improving the Sydney water supply. Rowe Street, which runs from Pitt Street to Castlereagh Street, was at that time named after him by in a vote by the council.

In February 1877, he was elected to the first Manly Municipal Council and was elected first Mayor of Manly, overseeing the first laying-out of the town of Manly, and serving as an alderman until 1880.

=== Military career ===
Rowe in his uniform as Commanding Officer of the NSW Corps of Engineers

Rowe was also involved in the volunteer New South Wales Colonial Forces, receiving a commission as a lieutenant in the newly formed New South Wales Corps of Engineers in 1872, and was promoted to the rank of captain in 1874.

When the Colonial Volunteer Force was disbanded and reorganised as the NSW Defence Force in 1878, Rowe was recommissioned a captain, and promoted to major in 1880. Raised to rank of brevet lieutenant colonel in 1886, Rowe undertook a European tour the following year, visiting Aldershot, Chatham, Enfield, and Woolwich, in search of information relating to defence matters.

Rowe later designed several entrenching tools for the use of the engineers corps, including a bullet-proof shovel. Following the return to England of Colonel Henry Renny-Tailyour in 1894, Rowe took up the position of Commander of the New South Wales Corps of Engineers, was promoted to the rank of colonel in 1895, and served until his retirement on 30 June 1898. He was a recipient of the Volunteer Officers' Decoration.

== Other activities ==
Rowe was the founder, and for many years president, of the New South Wales Institute of Architects, and was elected a Fellow of the Royal Institute of British Architects in 1884.

In 1888 the Premier Sir Henry Parkes appointed Rowe as the first president of the Board of Water Supply and Sewerage, and he served in that office until his death, with the exception of the period 1892 to 1896 when Cecil West Darley presided. His presidency was well-received, with an account after his death noting: "The great leaps and bounds by which the department has progressed, and its present state of efficiency, bear ample testimony to the capability of his administration".

== Death and legacy ==
Rowe died age 69 in January 1899 at Mona, his leased residence since 1881 in Darling Point. In accordance with his wishes "to be laid to rest near the sea", he was buried in his military uniform at Waverley Cemetery following a service at St Mark's Church, Darling Point.

Many buildings built to his designs still stand in Sydney, and Rowe Street in Sydney is named after him.

=== Harry Ruskin Rowe ===
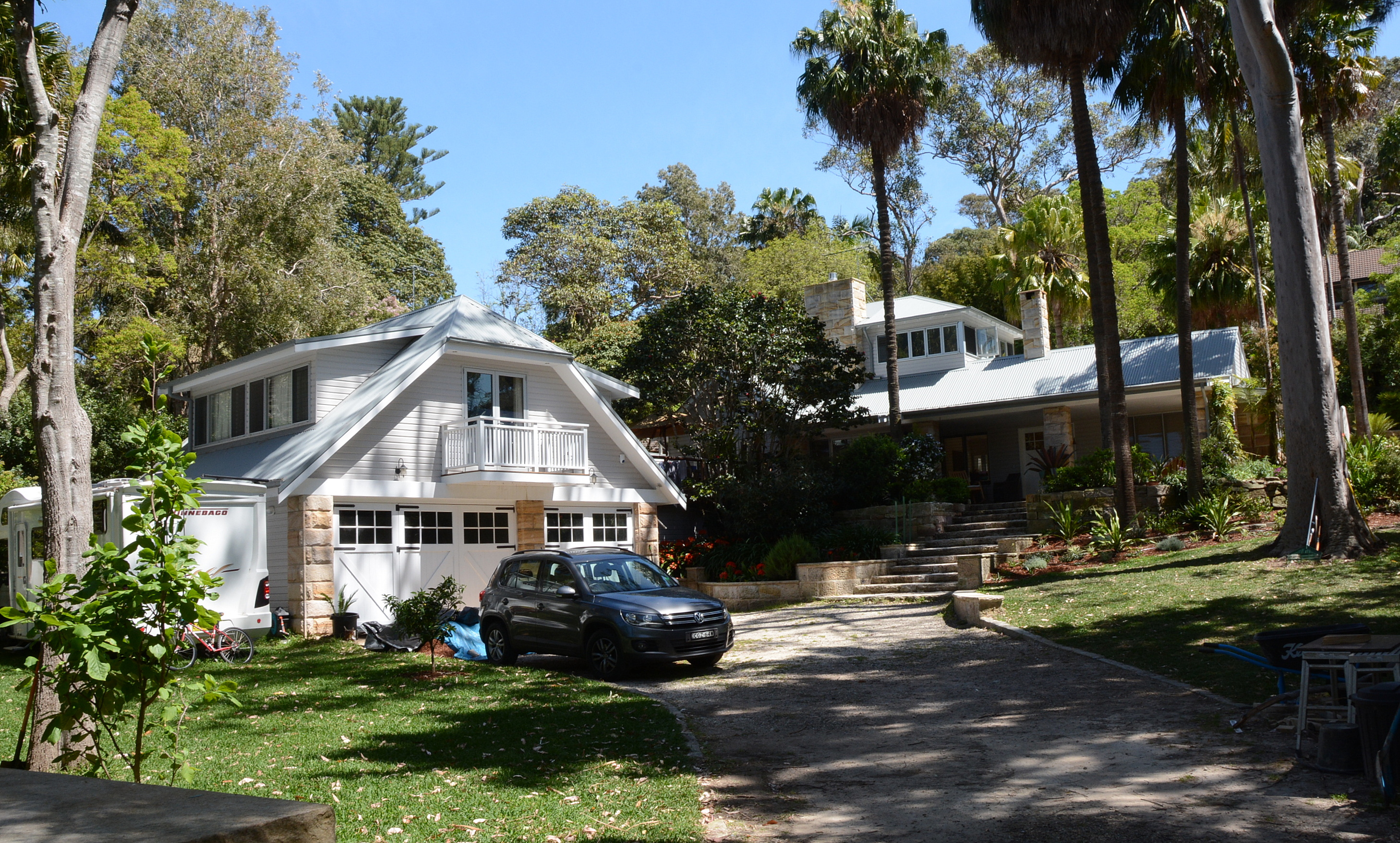
The Cabbage Trees, Ruskin Rowe, Avalon

Rowe's son Harry Ruskin Rowe was also successful as an architect. One of his most significant achievements was the creation in 1950 of Ruskin Rowe, an estate in the Sydney suburb of Avalon. Rowe acquired a house, "The Cabbage Trees", in the estate, using it as a weekender. The estate still exists and is heritage-listed.

Harry Ruskin Rowe also worked with Spain and Cosh at some point.

== Key works ==
(Many of the following buildings are heritage-listed):

- Chatswood South Uniting Church, Artarmon, New South Wales (1871)
- Presbyterian Church, Bridge Road, Glebe, New South Wales (1881)
- Original Randwick Borough Chambers (later Parish Centre of St Jude's Church, Randwick) (1862)
- Catherine Hayes Building (based on design by John Horbury Hunt), Prince of Wales Hospital, Randwick, New South Wales (1870)
- Tresco, Elizabeth Bay, New South Wales (1868)
- F.L. Kelly and Company Building, Yass, New South Wales (1869)
- St Paul's Presbyterian Church, Hill End, New South Wales (1872)
- Presbyterian Church, Bathurst (1871)
- Holy Trinity Anglican Church, Orange (1879)
- Aliiolani Hale, Honolulu, Hawaii (1872)
- Great Synagogue, Elizabeth Street, Sydney (1874)
- Former Stanmore Methodist Church (1874), now part of the Newington College drama centre
- Sydney Hospital, including Nightingale Wing, Macquarie Street, Sydney (1879)
- Newington College, Founders Wing including Prescott Hall, Stanmore (1878)
- Sydney Arcade, Pitt Street, Sydney (1874)
- Vickery's Building, Pitt Street, Sydney (1874)
- Vickery houses, Banksia, Wych Hazel, Ellerslie and Edina, now part of the War Memorial Hospital Waverley, New South Wales.
- Former Petersham Town Hall, Petersham (1882; extended 1892, demolished 1937)
- Former Stanmore Methodist Parsonage (1886), now Headmaster's residence, Newington College
- Ashton, Elizabeth Bay Road, Elizabeth Bay
- Imperial Arcade, Sydney (1891)
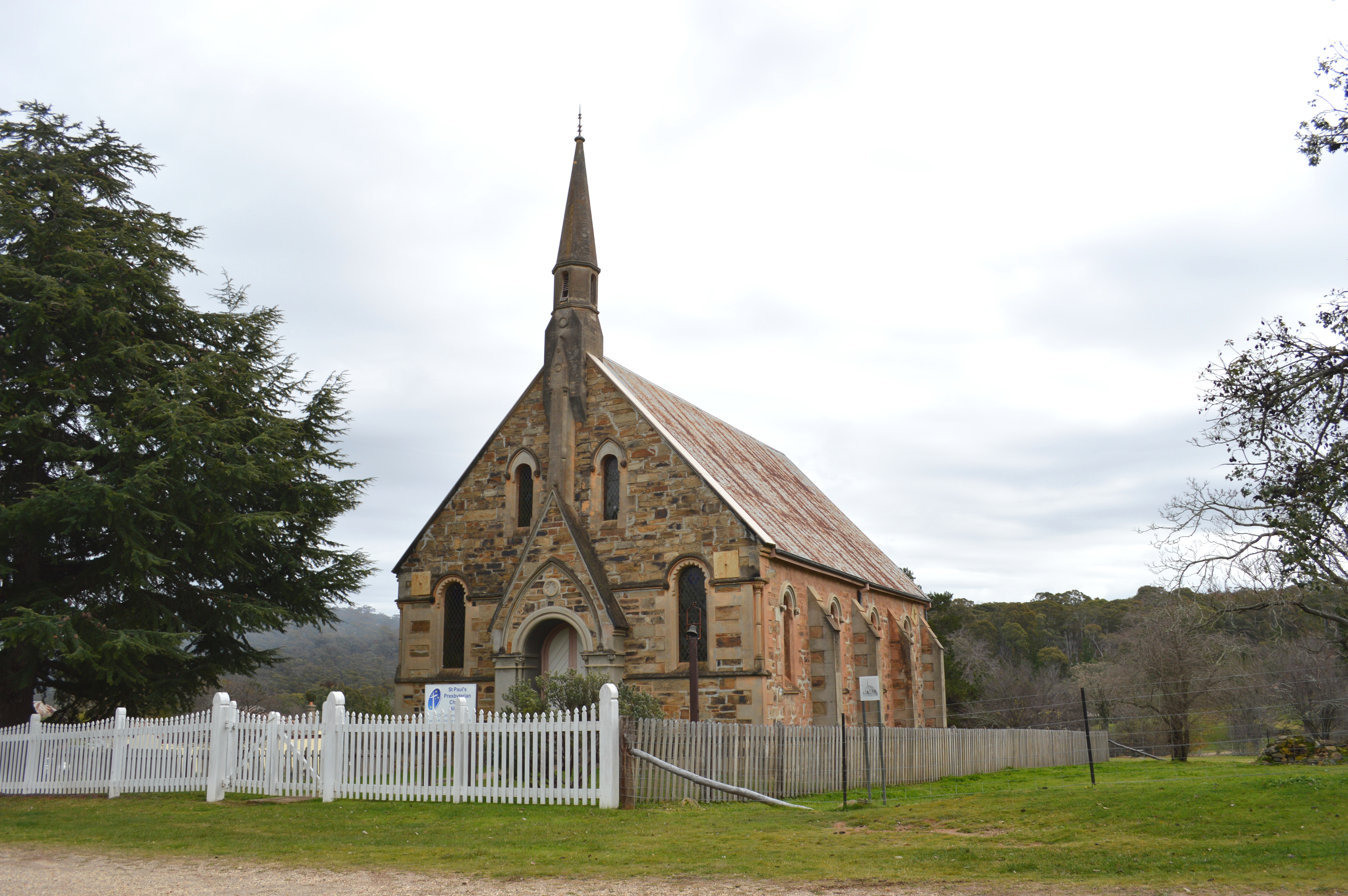
St Paul's Presbyterian Church, Hill End

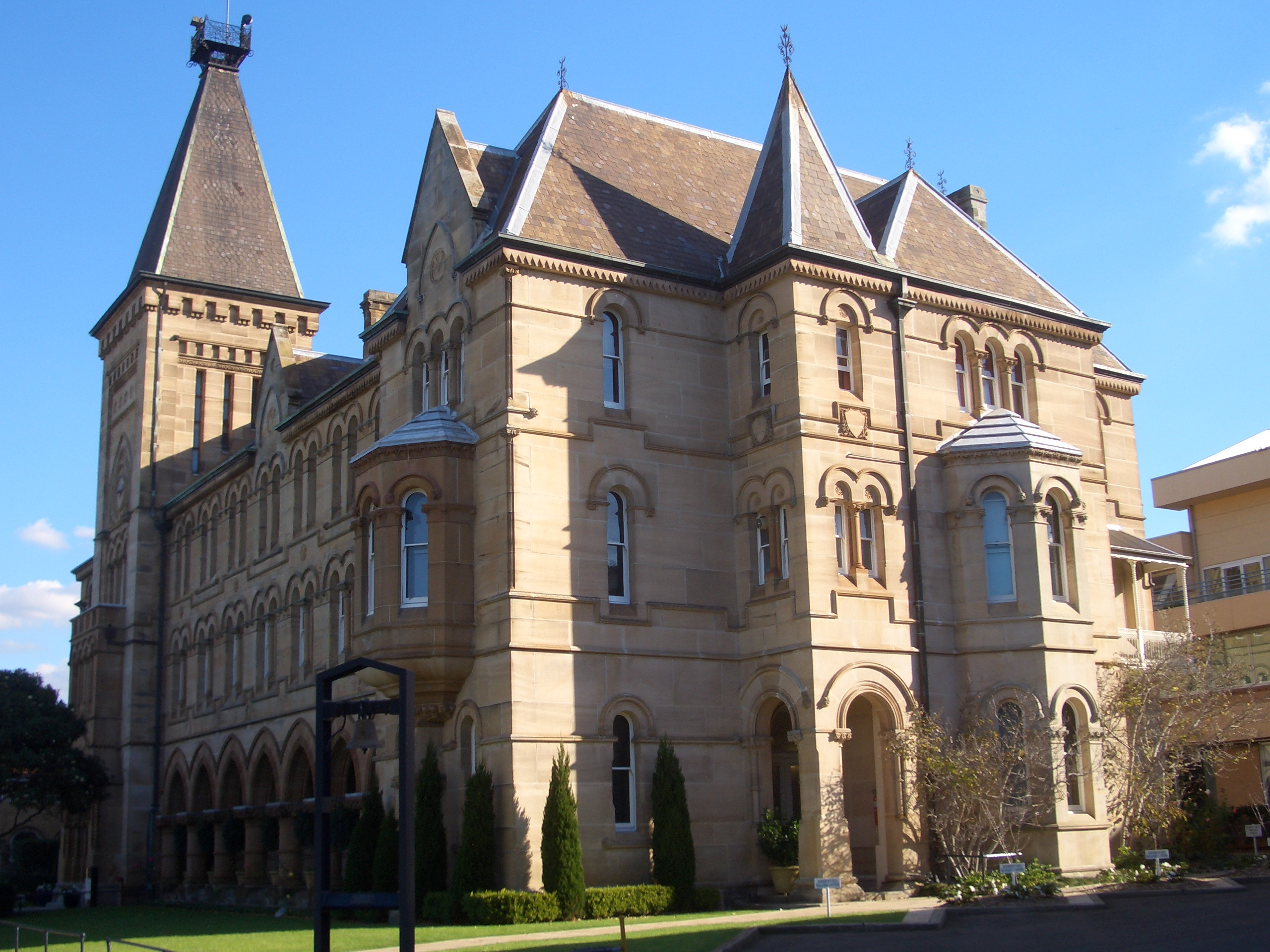
Founders Wing, Newington College

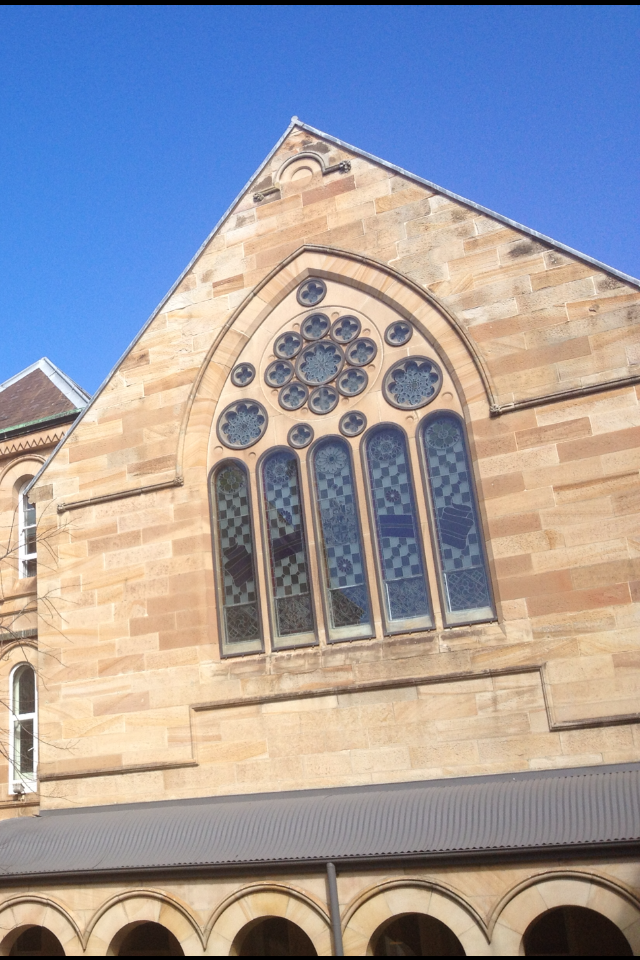
Prescott Hall, Newington College

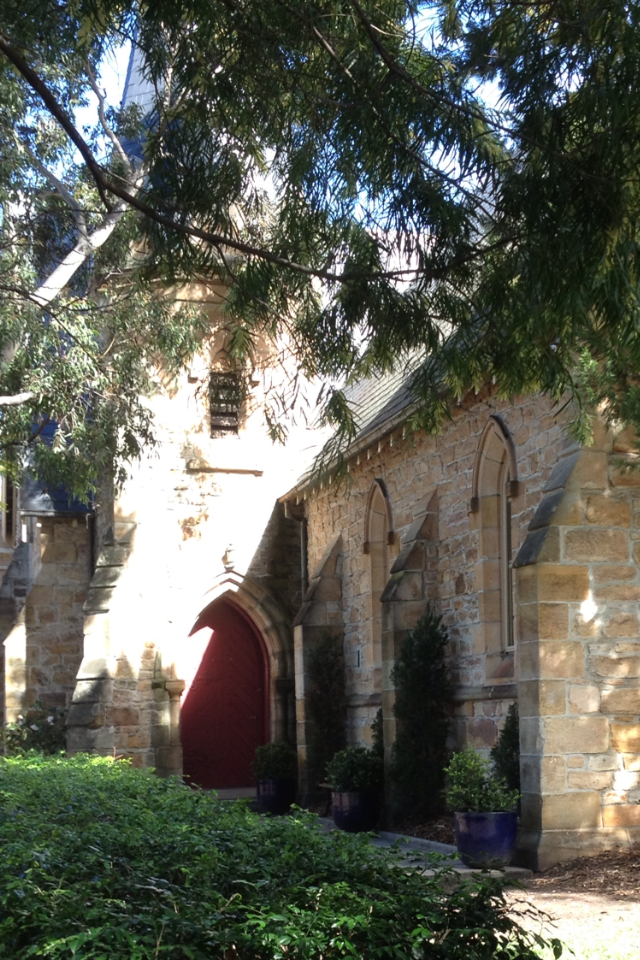
Stanmore Methodist Church, now part of the drama centre, Newington College

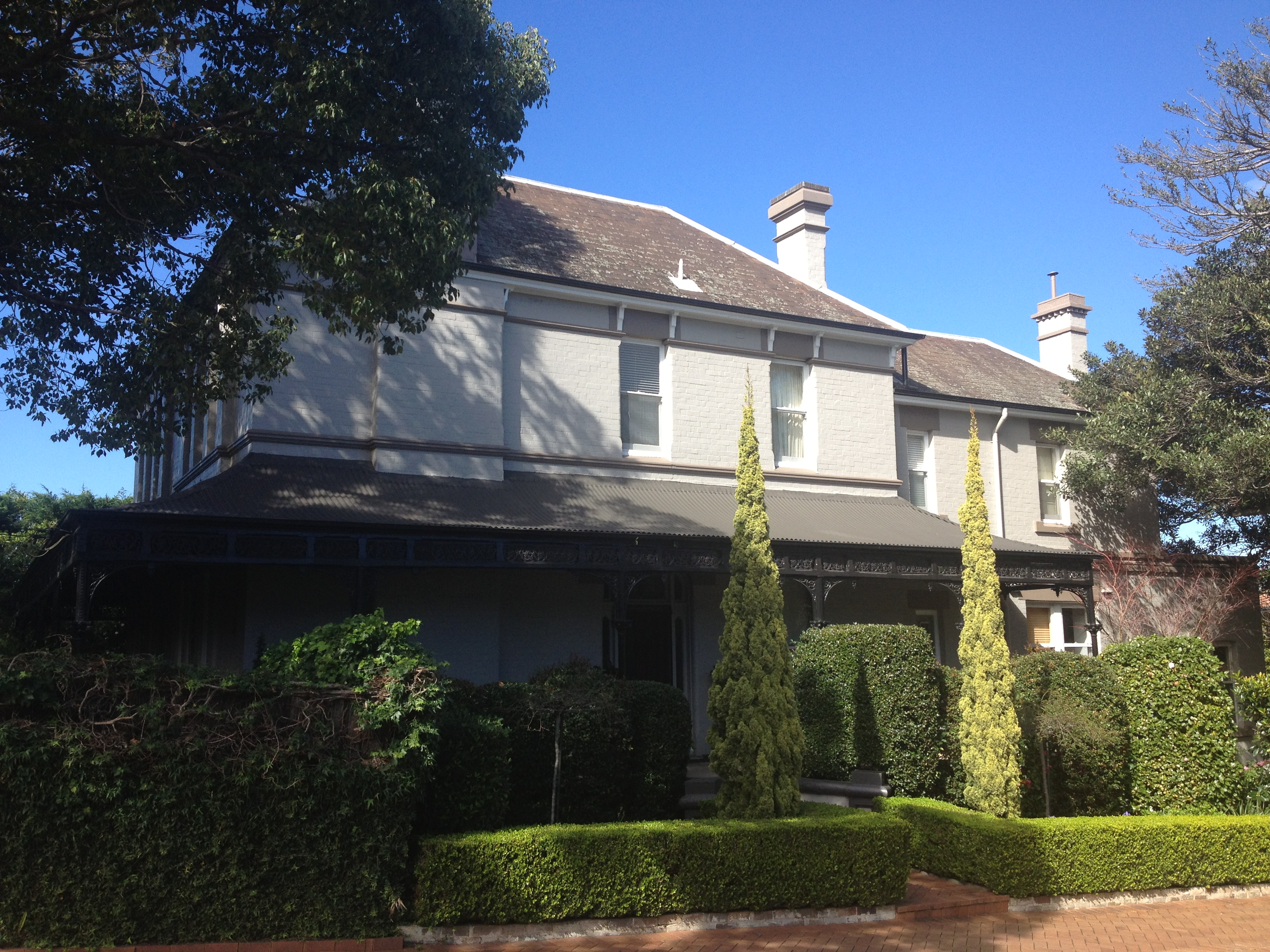
Stanmore Methodist Parsonage, now Centre for Critical Thinking and Ethics

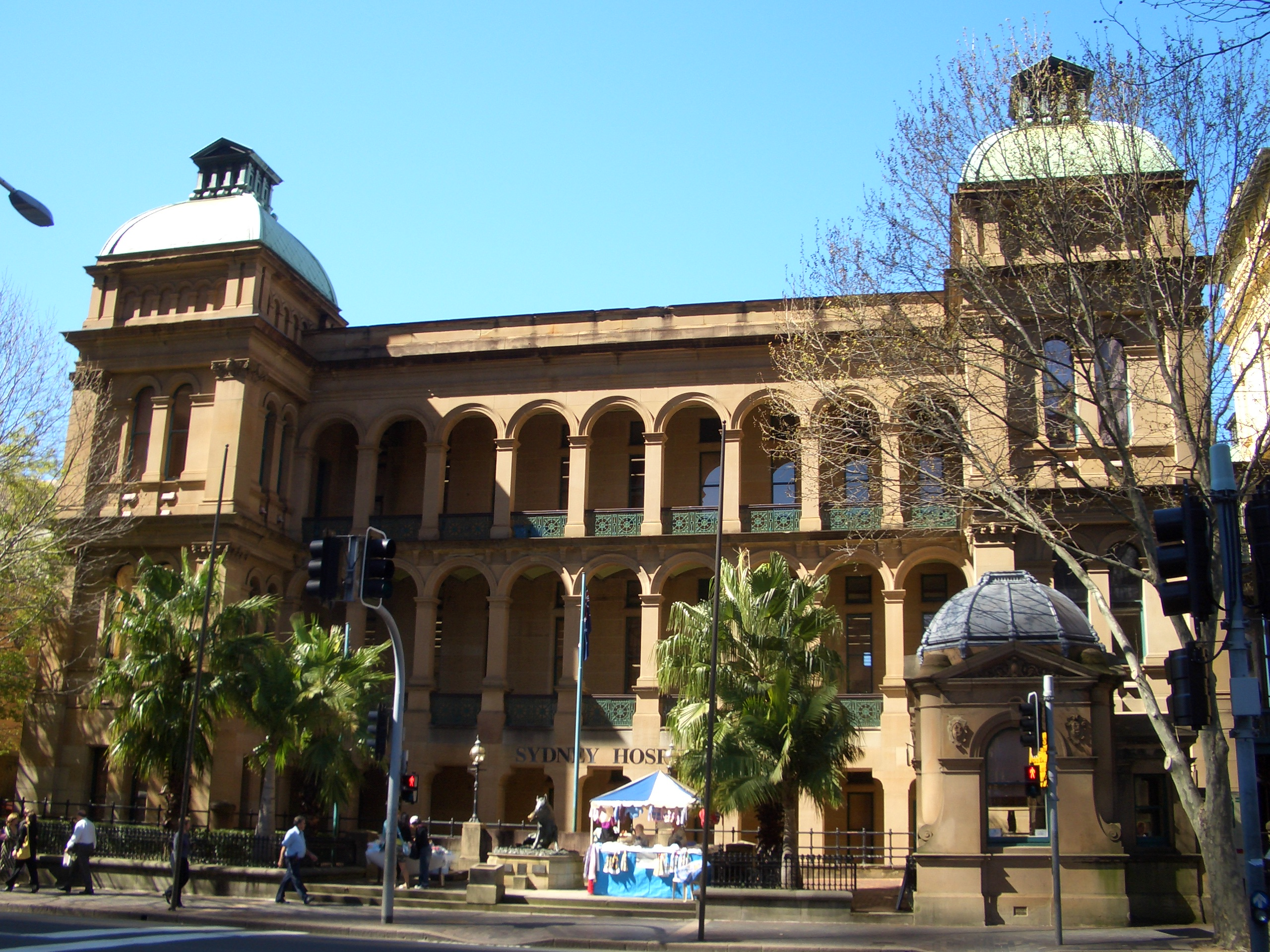
Sydney Hospital, Macquarie Street

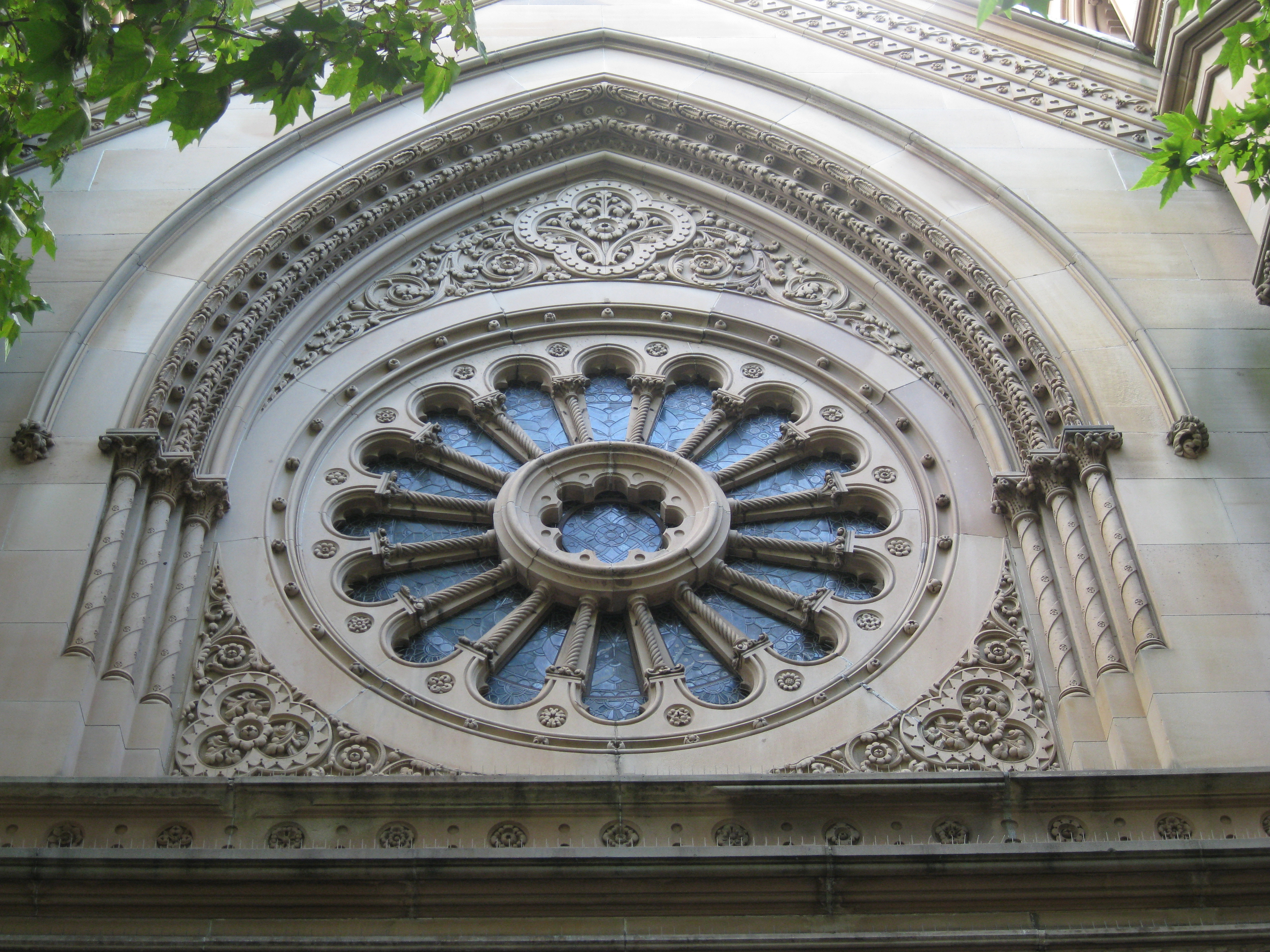
Great Synagogue, Elizabeth Street

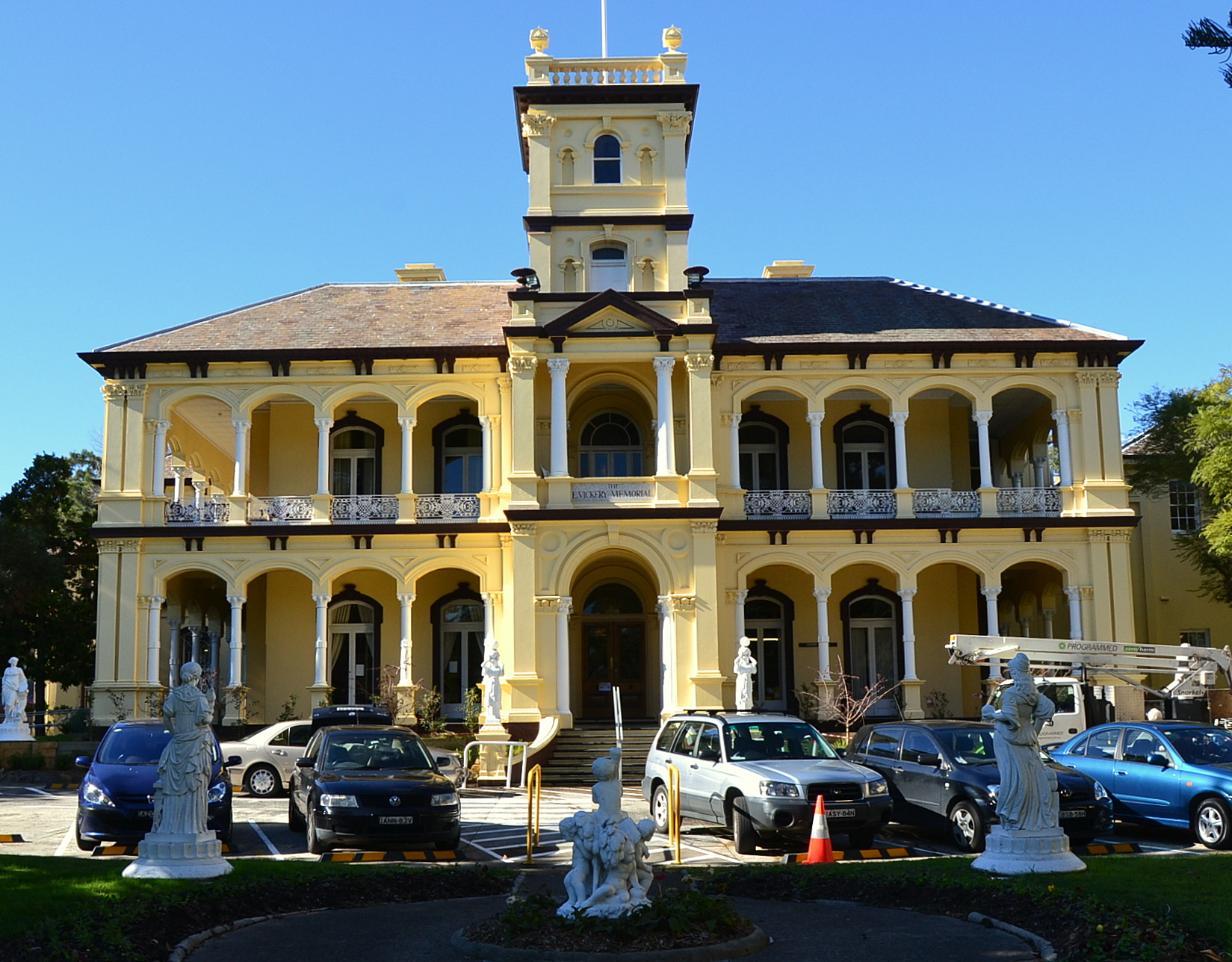
Edina, Waverley

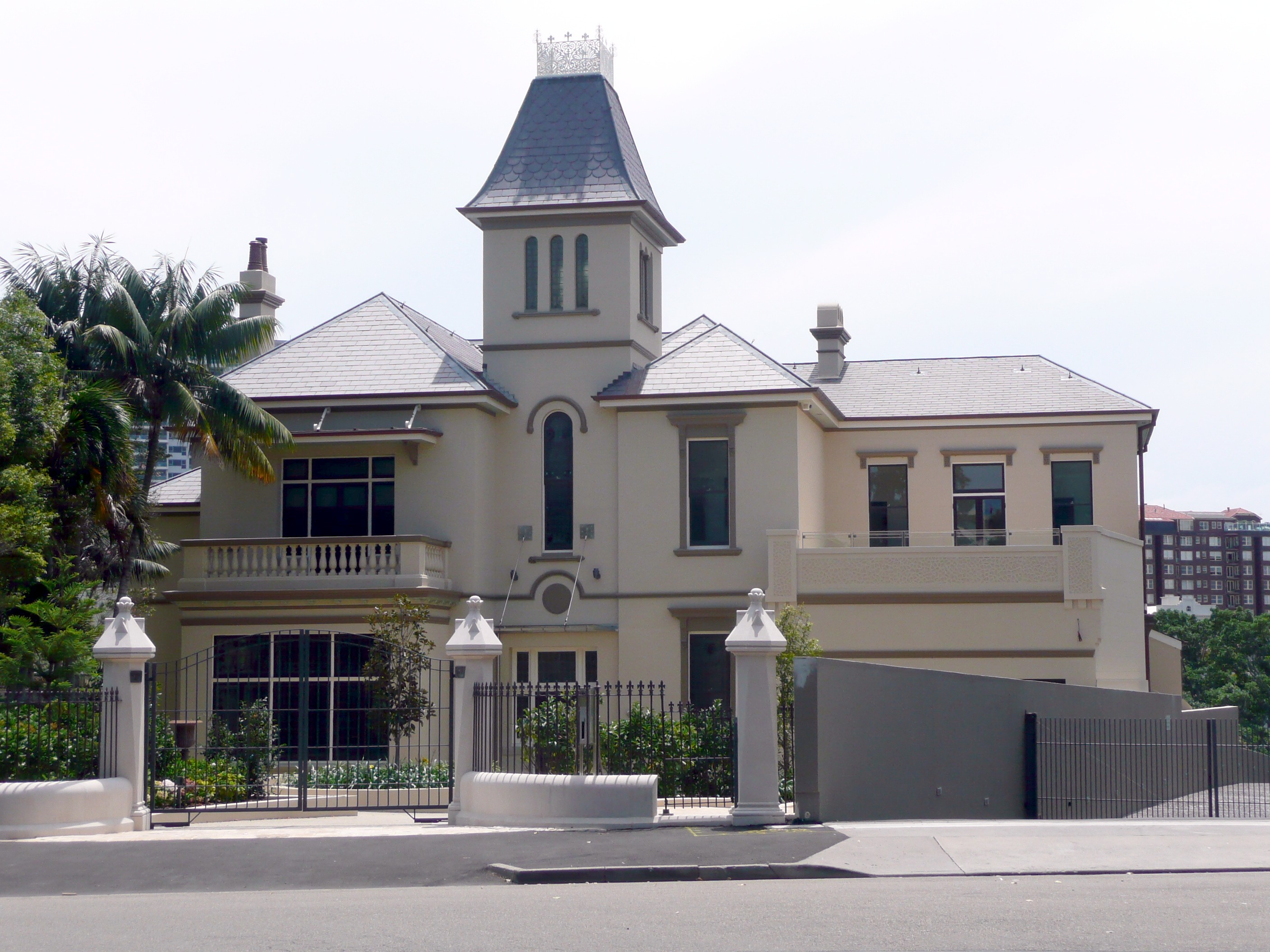
Ashton, Elizabeth Bay

Petersham Town Hall c. 1890

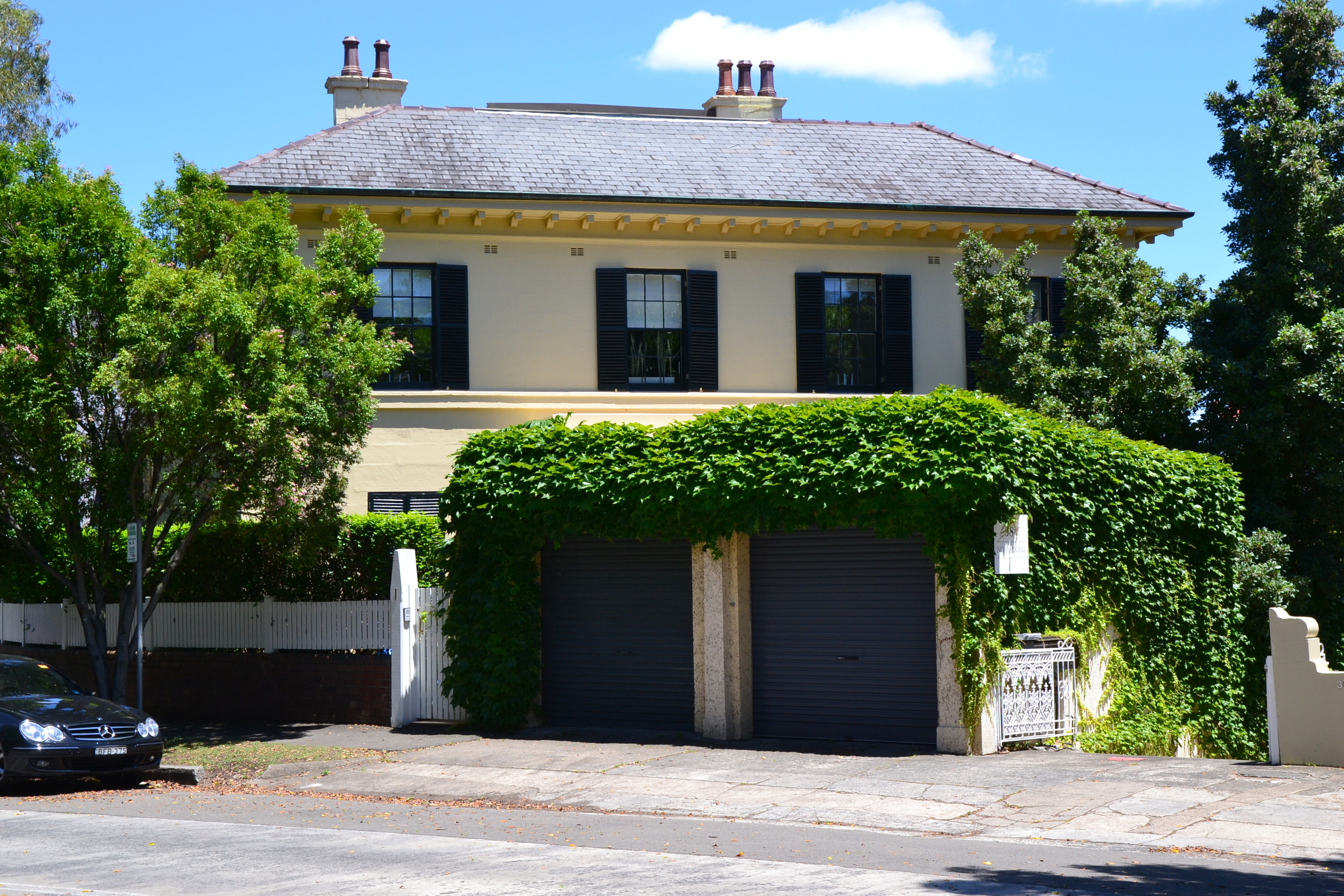
Mona, where Rowe died

Civic offices
New title	Mayor of Manly; 1877–1879	Succeeded by Alfred Hilder
Professional and academic associations
Preceded by George Allen Mansfield	President of the Institute of Architects of New South Wales; 1878–1889	Succeeded by John Horbury Hunt
Preceded by John Horbury Hunt	President of the Institute of Architects of New South Wales; 1895–1898	Succeeded by John Barlow
Government offices
New title	President of the Board of Water Supply and Sewerage; 1888–1892	Succeeded by Cecil West Darley
Preceded by Cecil West Darley	President of the Metropolitan Board of Water Supply and Sewerage; 1896–1899	Succeeded by Jacob Garrard
Military offices
Preceded by Colonel Henry Renny-Tailyour	Commanding Officer of the New South Wales Corps of Engineers; 1894–1898	Succeeded by Major Thomas Samuel Parrott
