= Cecil Hoskins =

Australian Industrialist

Sir Cecil Hoskins
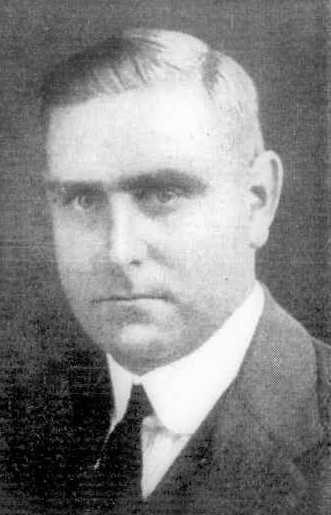
- Cecil Hoskins c. 1927

Personal details
- Born: 11 November 1889 Petersham, New South Wales
- Died: 8 March 1971 (aged 81) Moss Vale, New South Wales
- Spouse: Dorothy (née Loveridge)
- Children: Robert Arthur; Kenneth Charles; Donald Geoffrey; Hugh John; Elaine; Emily Marjorie
- Parent(s): Emily and Charles Hoskins
- Education: Burwood Public School; Homebush Grammar School; King's College, Goulburn; Newington College
- Occupation: Industrialist

Sir Cecil Harold Hoskins (11 November 1889 – 8 March 1971) was an Australian industrialist associated with the iron and steel industry. He is notable mainly for the establishment of the steel industry at Port Kembla, the company Australian Iron & Steel, and its subsequent merger with BHP in 1935. He was also on the board of the Australian Mutual Provident Society for many years and was its chairman from 1947 to 1962. He is less well known for his involvement in centre-right political organisations and the scouting movement, and his interest in landscape gardens.

== Early life ==
Cecil Hoskins was the fourth-eldest child of Charles Hoskins and his wife Emily. He was born in Petersham, New South Wales, on 11 November 1889. He was one of their eight children who would survive their early childhood, and the second-eldest son.

By the time of his birth, his father was on the verge of becoming a prosperous manufacturer, being a half owner, with his elder brother George, of the company G & C Hoskins. In only a few years, the company expanded rapidly as a manufacturer of cast iron and steel pipes.

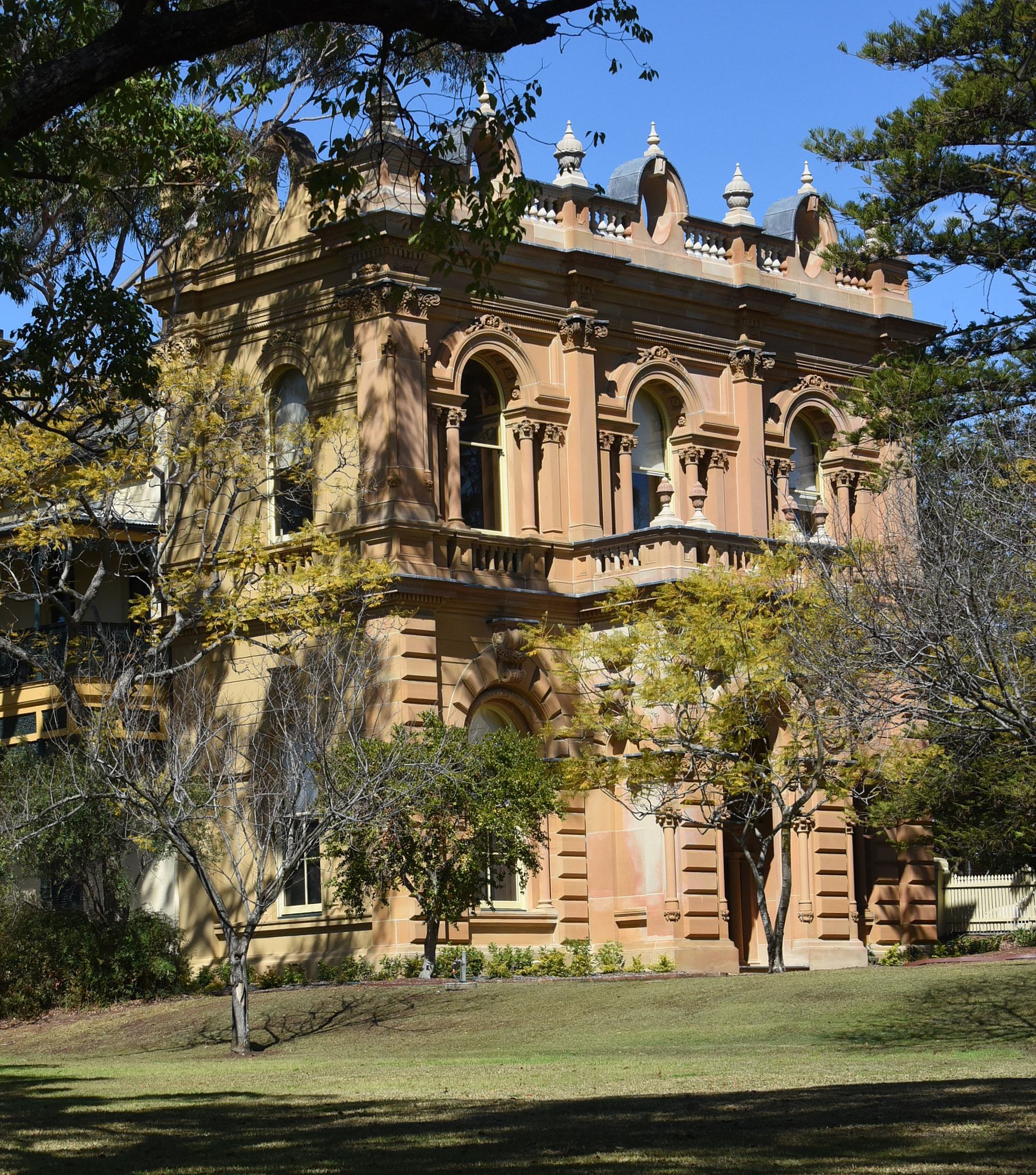
'Illyria', the Hoskins family home at Strathfield until 1908

Hoskins had a privileged upbringing, as the son of a wealthy industrialist. Sharing his father's enthusiasm for motor cars, in 1905, he was driving a 'Star' 7 h.p. car that he shared with his two brothers. He committed a traffic offence, in 1906, at a time when cars were a rarity on Sydney's roads. Cecil and his younger brother Sidney were driving well before drivers' licences were introduced in NSW, in 1910, something that may have influenced the government to set the minimum age for licensed drivers at 17 years old.

Hoskins attended Burwood Public School, Homebush Grammar School at Strathfield and boarded at King's College in Goulburn while his parents were in Perth, in relation to the Goldfields Pipeline. He finished his disjointed schooling, from 1903 until 1906, when he and his brothers were day students at Newington College. Hoskins left school after Form IV.

He subsequently worked at an ironmongers, Briscoe & Co., until the beginning of 1908, after which he was needed at Lithgow.

He never attained tertiary qualifications of any kind, something that, later in his life, would colour his own attitude to university-trained engineers, metallurgists, and other professionals, almost certainly to his own detriment.

== Lithgow ==
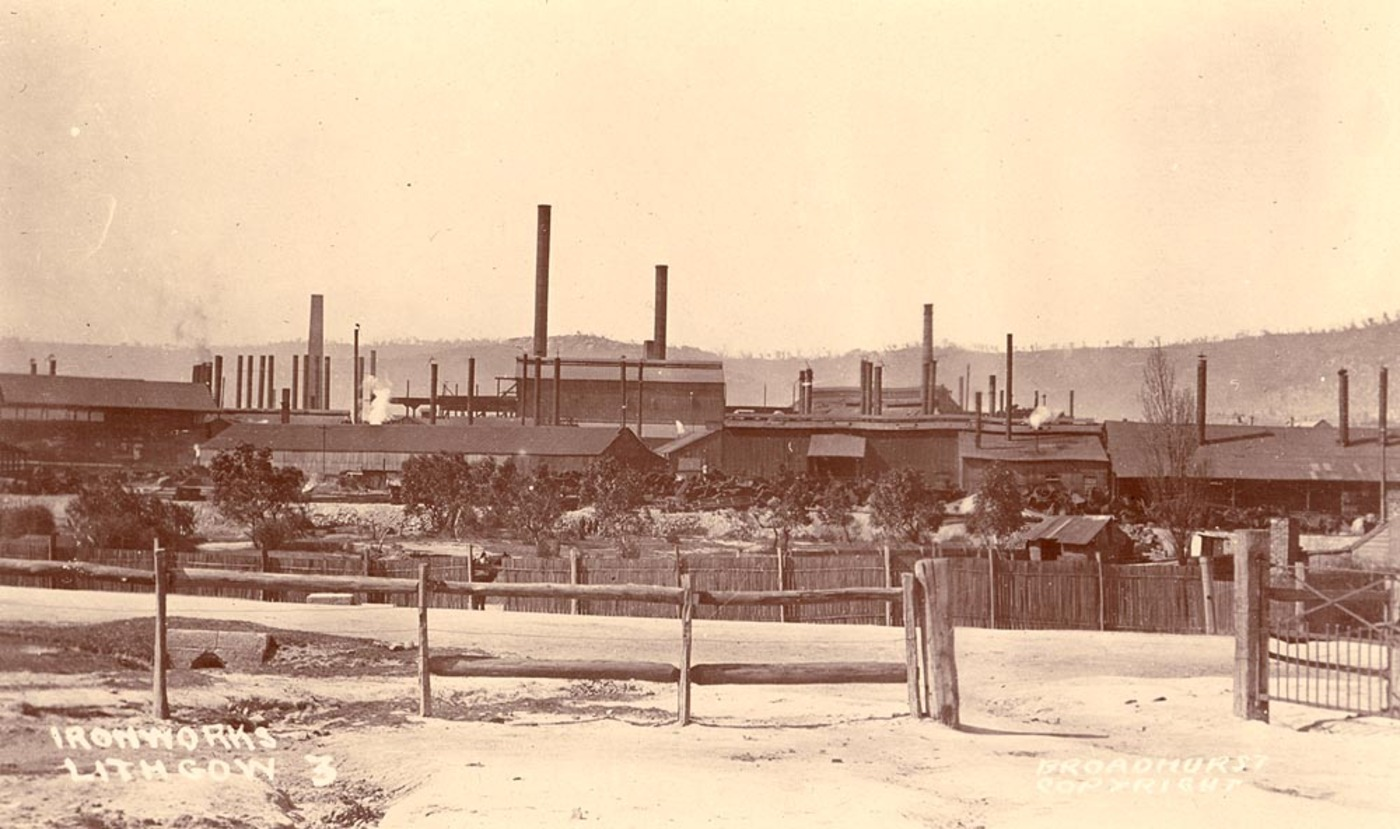
Ironworks, Lithgow; this part of the plant lay west from the blast furnace site. (Taken between 1900 and 1927)

Hoskins had not worked in the family company, until G & C Hoskins took over the operations of William Sandford Limited, at the Eskbank Ironworks, Lithgow. Charles Hoskins brought the family to Lithgow. Charles's elder brother George and his three sons (George jnr, Leslie, and Harold) managed the pipe manufacturing business, which was about to undergo a large expansion involving the opening of a new pipe plant at Rhodes in 1911.

William Sandford and his sons had left the works, as the Hoskins took over Lithgow. Sandford's General Manager, William Thornley, left soon afterwards, and was gone by April 1908. Cecil and Guildford, though still very young men, needed to take on management roles. Their younger brother, Arthur Sidney (Sid), ended his schooling prematurely, after refusing to be left out of the family's challenge.

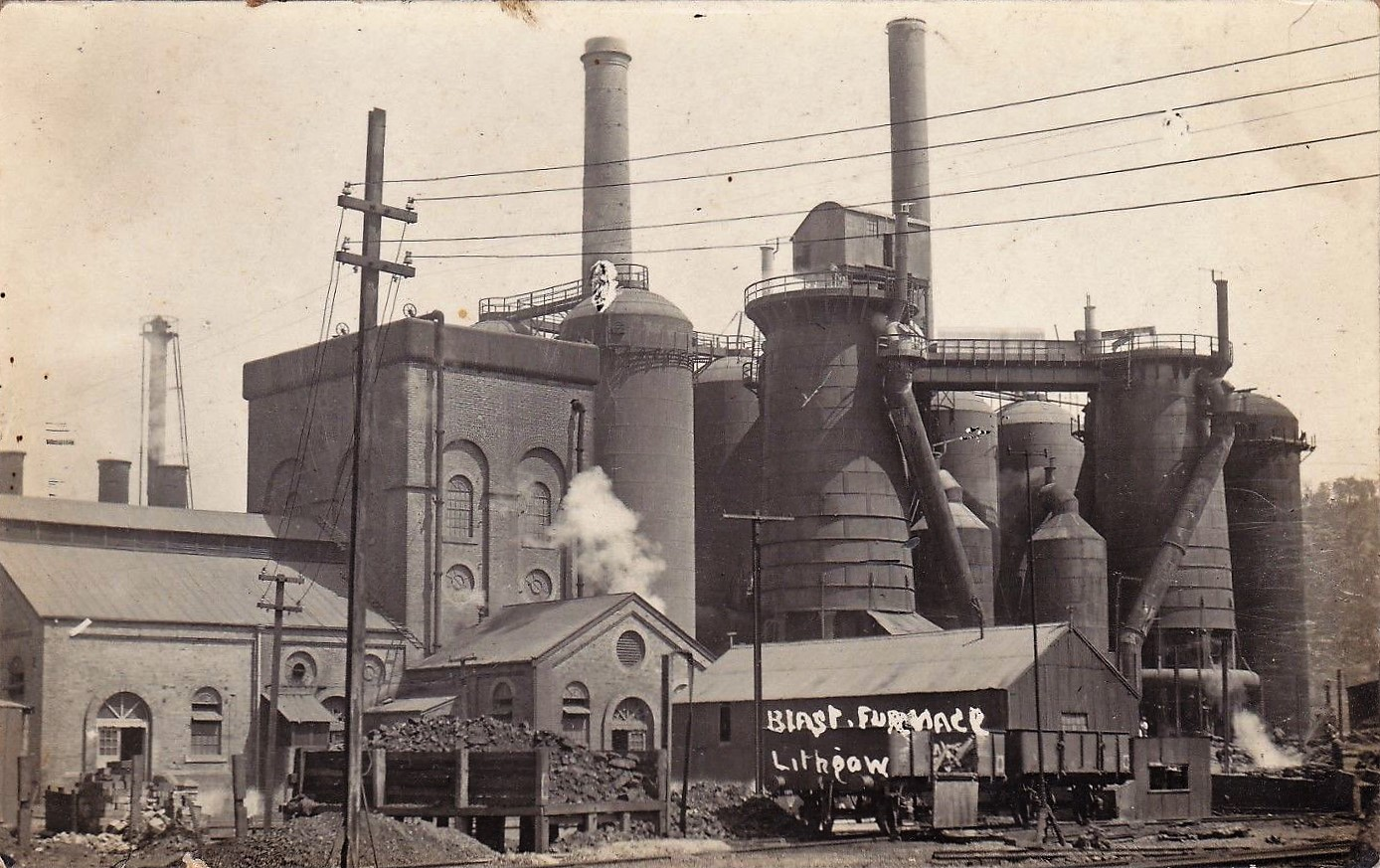
Blast Furnaces at Lithgow. Because there are two furnaces shown, this photograph was taken, between 1913 and 1928, during the period that the Hoskins family owned the plant.

Prior to his arrival in Lithgow, Hoskins had never set foot in an iron and steel works; even his father had only visited the Lithgow works for the official opening of Sandford's blast furnace in May 1907. However, Hoskins' father was a tough businessman, who had plenty of experience in managing a heavy industrial business, and who would turn around the business by 1914, by modifications and additions to the plant.

By Hoskins own admission he worked initially more in the office and sales side of the Lithgow works. That is not to say that he did not play an important part in turning around the Lithgow works. Under William Sandford, the works had been run in an idiosyncratic manner, and the accounts, so far as they existed, were in a mess. It took a relatively short time for the new owners to understand that the works actually had been making a loss.

He was, however, in the thick of it, with his father and elder brother, when all three were under siege by rock-throwing rioters, during the protracted industrial dispute of 1911. In 1912, still in his early twenties, he became a director of G & C Hoskins.

He lost two of his sisters; Hilda, in a level-crossing accident in 1912, and Nellie to tuberculosis, in 1914. In 1916, his elder brother, Guildford, died after an accident at home.

The unexpected death of Guildford thrust Hoskins into the role of son and heir, even more so after George Hoskins retired. Charles bought out George's family's share of the business in 1919, renaming it Hoskins Iron & Steel in 1920. Hoskins was groomed as Charles Hoskins' main successor. In April 1921, he was to claim that he had spent at least six months in every department of the Lithgow works, and by that time had toured America to see modern plants and to learn, in preparation for the later plant at Port Kembla. In March 1921, Hoskins was the public spokesman of the company, under the tragic circumstances of the Cadia mine disaster.

When Charles Hoskins retired in 1924, Hoskins became chairman of Hoskins Iron and Steel. He and his brother Sid became co-managing directors of the company. As a result of his new role as chairman, Hoskins and his family left Lithgow for Sydney in November 1924.

== Sydney ==
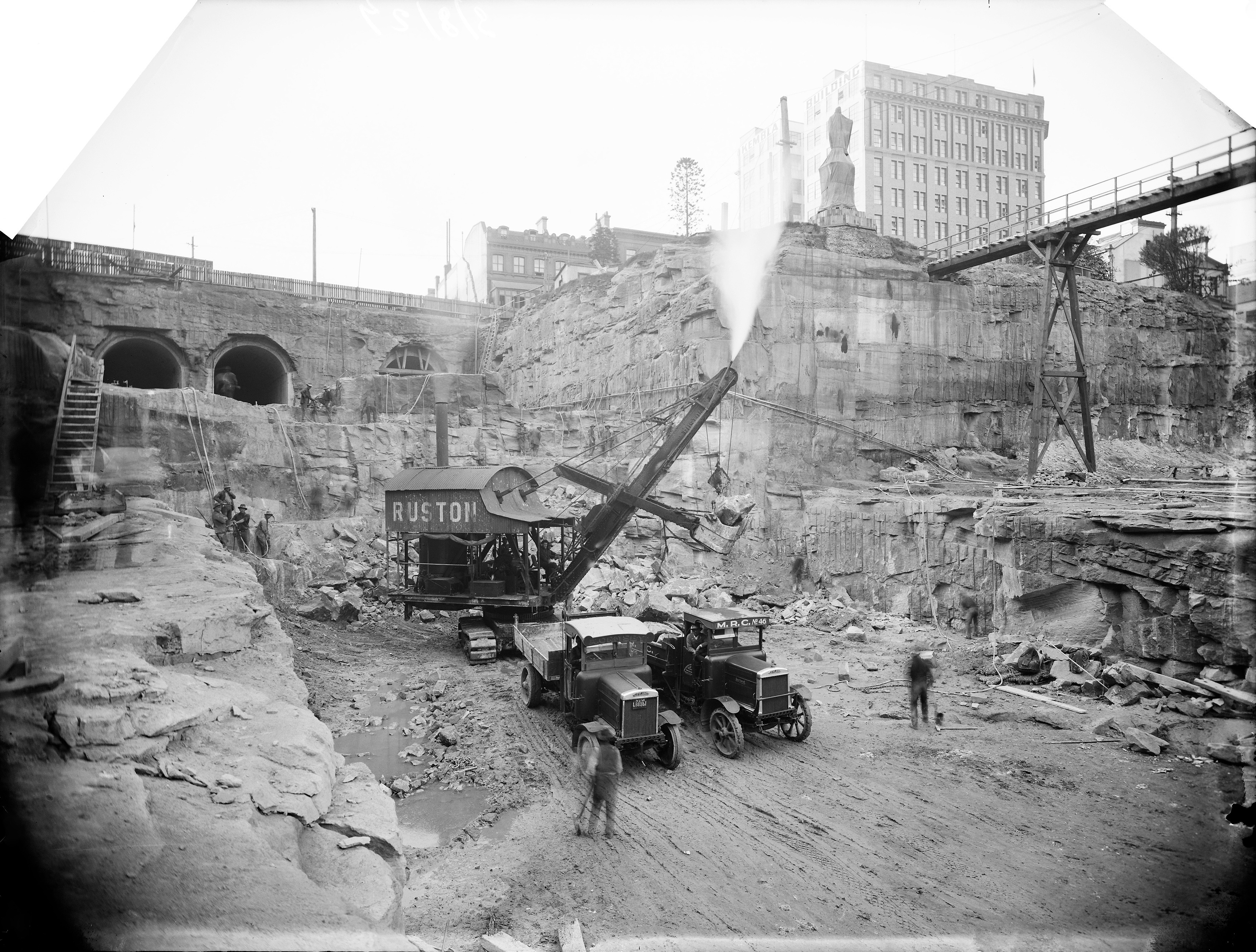
Construction work for the Sydney Harbour Bridge in 1926. The new Kembla Building is the background on the right

Although the name of Hoskins is commonly associated with Lithgow, the family business started in Sydney and many of Hoskins' family lived there. The original businesses of Hoskins Iron and Steel, the pipe manufacturing plants at Ultimo and Rhodes, were still operating there during the 1920s.

With the move to Port Kembla being planned, the retirement of his father, the prospect of needing to raise additional capital, and the need to influence the Government of New South Wales, it made sense that Hoskins had a presence in Sydney. As chairman and co-managing director, he moved there at the end of 1924.

By late 1924, the Kembla Building, a modern office building of 12 storeys—designed by architect John Barr—was nearing completion, at 58–60 Margaret Street, Sydney. It was the new head office of Hoskins Iron and Steel. The building was owned by C. H. Hoskins Pty Ltd, the private company set up by Charles Hoskins to hold his family's business interests. It was soon a fashionable office address. Its occupants, as well as Hoskins' businesses, included foreign government representatives, architectural firms, and various other prominent firms.

In August 1927, Southern Portland Cement Limited was created to set up a cement works near Berrima. It was associated with Hoskins Iron and Steel, and Howard Smith Limited, an Australian company that would later back Hoskins' plans at Port Kembla. Hoskins and his brother Sid became directors of the new company, with its registered office being the Kembla Building.

In November 1927, Hoskins returned for a three-month business trip. As well as visiting foreign steel plants, it is likely that it was around this time he was meeting with the British companies that would later back the move to Port Kembla. When Australian Iron & Steel (AI&S) was founded in June 1928, its registered office was the Kembla Building.

Hoskins and his family lived in Sydney until around 1935. During that time, his wife Dorothy became socially prominent.

== Relocating an industry ==
Hoskins' father Charles Hoskins had realised that Lithgow had inherent disadvantages as a site for a modern steelworks. From as early as 1911, he had been interested in building a plant at Port Kembla. In late 1920, the company acquired 380 acres of the Wentworth Estate, at Port Kembla, as the site for a steelworks. When Charles Hoskins retired in 1924, the plan for a new works at Port Kembla was in place, but there was some deliberate ambiguity about the future of the existing steelworks at Lithgow. Charles Hoskins died in 1926 and would not see his vision fulfilled.

Hoskins had learnt what he knew of steel production from his time at the relatively antiquated Lithgow works and from trips that he made overseas to visit more modern plants. He correctly surmised that American and German steelmakers were more technologically advanced than the British practice which he associated with the old Lithgow technology. However, constrained by finances, compromises would need to be made.

The transfer of operations began in 1927 and took over four years to complete. Cecil Hoskins would be responsible for the construction and commissioning of the new plant at Port Kembla, while his brother Sid would run the operations at Lithgow, as these gradually wound down. The redundant parts of the Lithgow plant were to be demolished. Some of the Lithgow works reappeared at Port Kembla, but much of it would end up as scrap iron fed into the new blast furnace.

=== Blast furnace operations ===
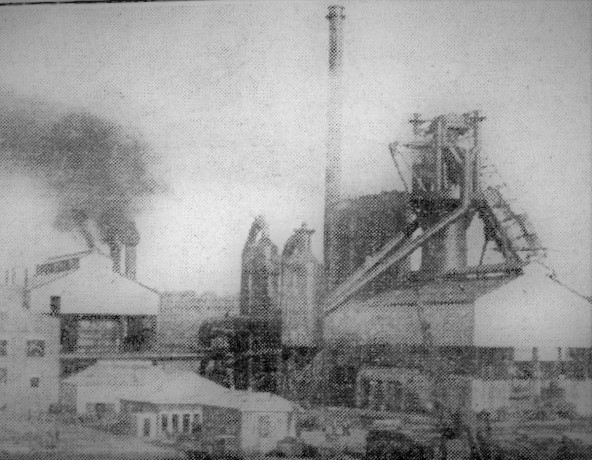
New blast furnace at Port Kembla (Sept 1928)

Hoskins needed to raise funds to commence work at Port Kembla and in 1926, Hoskins Iron and Steel went to the market with 300,000 preference shares, of £1 paying 7.5%. Construction began on the site of the new blast furnace during May 1927. Capable of producing 6,000 tons of iron per week, it would easily exceed the combined output of the Lithgow blast furnaces.

Castings for the new furnace were being made at the Lithgow works, in June 1928, and it was becoming increasingly obvious that the new furnace would replace the two at Lithgow, In August 1928—just twenty years after G & C Hoskins had taken over the troubled operations of William Sandford Limited at Lithgow—Hoskins' mother, Emily Hoskins, lit the new blast furnace.

No sooner than all seemed well with the furnace, in early September 1928, a tap hole blew out unleashing a flood of molten iron, which left injury and destruction in its path. This would be but one of the 'teething problems' the young plant would have in its early years.

The company had built a private wharf on the Outer Harbour, to land its iron ore. The first ore from South Australia arrived in July 1928, dooming the existing ore mine at Cadia and its branch railway. The company's other ore mine at Tallawang had already closed in February 1927. Hoskins had secured a mining lease on Cockatoo Island (Western Australia) and its 30-million tons of iron ore, in 1927. However, Port Kembla would instead depend upon BHP to supply its South Australian ore, under a contract that would expire in 1938. The wharf would also later be used to unload imported equipment for the steel furnaces and rolling mills.

The railway line from Moss Vale to Unanderra opened in 1932 allowing limestone and dolomite for the blast furnace to be brought more easily from Marulan and Mount Fairy. The company was already making coke at Wongawilli, and had been railing coke to Lithgow since 1916; from 1928 it would go the shorter distance to Port Kembla. Dolomite was quarried at Mount Fairy, replacing the old Havilah deposit.

Gradually, the Lithgow iron-making plant was shut down as operations were transferred in stages to Port Kembla. The first part of Lithgow to close was the No.2 Blast Furnace in December 1927, ostensibly for repairs. The coke ovens were closed in February 1928. Falling demand was blamed for both of these closures. That was followed by the closure of the remaining blast furnace in November 1928. There was a degree of deception involved; Hoskins could not show his hand until the Port Kembla furnace had proven itself in production. The workers at Lithgow were given the impression that the closures may only be temporary, and that there were no firm plans to demolish the two furnaces. However, once the last blast furnace closed, demolition soon commenced. The iron ore quarry at Cadia had already closed, by early November 1928, as had the private Cadia mine railway.

Pig iron was then railed from Port Kembla to Lithgow to feed the open-hearth steelmaking furnaces there. In 1930, the Hoskins iron pipe operation, was relocated from Rhodes in Sydney to Port Kembla, where a new Lanvand spun pipe plant could access pig iron from the new blast furnace.

=== Australian Iron & Steel ===
Hoskins Iron and Steel, the Hoskins family-owned company had started work on the new blast furnace, but it was financially incapable of building the steelmaking plant and rolling mills that it needed to completely replace Lithgow with a larger steelworks on the coast. Once the process of moving to Port Kembla was under way, it was necessary to raise additional capital. Hoskins would need to find other shareholders. He also had to face the fact that many of the Hoskins company's existing assets would need to be written off, when Lithgow closed.

The assets of Hoskins Iron and Steel—Lithgow works, Port Kembla blast furnace, Wongawilli colliery, pipe plants at Rhodes and in Brisbane, and the half share of Southern Portland Cement—were folded into a new public company Australian Iron and Steel, which was set up in May 1928. Hoskins Iron and Steel went into voluntary liquidation in June 1928.

The ordinary shares in the new company were held by the former shareholders of Hoskins Iron and Steel (the Hoskins family), Dorman Long and Baldwins Lid (two British companies) and Howard Smith Limited (an Australian coal and shipping company). There were also preference shareholders, who received preference shares paying 7.5%.

Only Howard Smith and the preference shareholders paid cash for their shares. Hoskins and Dorman Long received their shares in exchange for assets that they contributed to the new company. Baldwins received their shares as a part payment for disused rolling mill equipment to be removed from their Margam works and reinstalled at Port Kembla. Howard Smith also became the shipping agent for the new company.

As previous owners of Hoskins Iron and Steel, the Hoskins family was the largest (but not the majority) shareholder in the new company. Cecil Hoskins became chairman of the new company and his brother (Arthur) Sidney Hoskins also joined the board.

=== Steelmaking and steel section rolling mills ===
Work progressed on the Port Kembla plant during 1929–30. Despite the newly raised capital, Hoskins still did not have enough and was attempting to build the new plant at the lowest possible cost. The two open-hearth furnaces were brand new, as was the 75 ton furnace crane. However, all the 'new' rolling mills were second hand. The bloom mill and the 36-inch rail, sections and plate mill were relocated from the Margam works of Baldwins in Wales. The 10-inch bar mill and a 20-inch light structural section mill were to be dismantled at Lithgow and reassembled at Port Kembla. Some mill buildings were also brought from Lithgow and reassembled, all to save cost. Unusually, there was no billet mill, with billets to be rolled in the 36-inch mill, a compromise, which reduced capital cost and echoed the similar use of the 27-inch mill at Lithgow.

Hoskins closed the Brisbane pipe plant and concentrated the manufacture of steel pipes at Alexandria. The land at South Brisbane had been the personal property of his father and it became part of his estate for distribution to his widow and children.

Steel-making began at Port Kembla in early November 1931. Until then, steel ingots were railed from Lithgow for rolling in the new bloom mill. By April 1932, Hoskins could report that one of the two American-designed open-hearth steel furnaces and all the mills were in operation at Port Kembla.

The last ingot of steel from the Lithgow works had already been made in September 1931, and soon afterwards work on demolishing the Lithgow open hearth furnaces commenced. For a time, ingots were railed from Port Kembla to Lithgow, and rolled into rails or billets in the old 27-inch mill, until the 36-inch mill was ready at Port Kembla. The last mill to go was the 10-inch mill; it and its building were dismantled, using its own overhead travelling crane running on a progressively shorter runway.

In December 1931, the last steel was rolled at Lithgow, and all that remained of the company's operations there was a colliery. In January 1932, with demolitions complete, the last employees of the steelworks at Lithgow were laid off. The company's locomotives, 'Iron Duke', 'Koala', 'Possum', and 'Wallaby', and the locomotive-crane 'Eskbank' were the easiest of the Lithgow equipment to relocate.

The 10-inch mill had been brought from Lithgow and was put into service temporarily. An American expert was brought out to rework the mill, and Hoskin's son, Kenneth Hoskins worked with him. A 13-inch continuous roughing stand was added and the old 10-inch section was reconfigured as 'cross-country' finishing stands. Most of the modified mill was electrically powered, using two 30-year-old 'Dick Kerr' rotary convertor sets retrieved from an a.c, to d.c. electricity sub-station in Sydney. The upgraded mill opened in January 1934. Although cobbled together with parts from various sources, it was a success. Once this mill was in service, the other mill relocated from Lithgow, the 20-inch mill, was taken out of service.

The company also modified its bloom mill, so that it could roll slabs and narrow plates (for making spiral-wound pipes), as well as blooms.

=== Impact on Lithgow and Wollongong ===
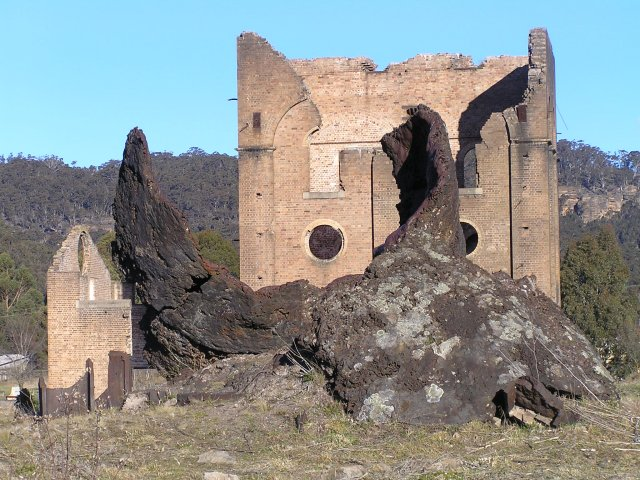
Ruins of the blast furnace blower house, with a 'bosh skull', from one of the blast furnaces, in the foreground

The closure of the Lithgow steelworks at the height of the Great Depression was an unmitigated economic disaster for the inland town. Much of the management and workforce—together with their families, some 5,000 people—followed Hoskins to the coast. In 1929, Lithgow had the fourth largest population in New South Wales—after Sydney, Newcastle, and Broken Hill—but by 2016, it was 36th. Lithgow's population fell from around 18,000, in 1929, to only 11,530 in 2016.

Although the Hoskins had endowed Lithgow with some fine buildings, the impact of the closure the steelworks led to some long-term resentment of the family, from those residents who remained. Between 1928 and early 1932, some parts of the old Lithgow works were re-erected at Port Kembla but other parts, including the two Lithgow blast furnaces, made the journey to Port Kembla only as scrap to be fed into the furnaces of the younger plant. What could not be reused was just abandoned in place. The stark and desolate ruin of the blast furnaces' blower house still stands as a reminder of demise of the town's main industry.

Correspondingly, although there had been some earlier industrial development there, the arrival of the steelworks at Port Kembla—with the migration of employees from Lithgow and, to a lesser extent, Sydney—resulted in the population of Wollongong doubling in the ten years to 1936. Wollongong would become the third largest city in the state.

== Port Kembla ==
=== A new steelworks ===
By 1932, the plant at Port Kembla was making, bars, iron pipes, rails and plate. Learning from the ad-hoc layout of the old Lithgow plant, the new steelworks was laid out in a logical plan, with minimal transport required between stages in the production process. Planned expansions—a sheet mill, galvanising plant, and modifications to its bar mill—were accommodated within the overall master plan for the site.

However, the new plant was beset with difficulties that, ultimately, would prove too great for Hoskins to resolve. The new plant was run, for the most part, by the same managers and supervisors who had run the old-fashioned Lithgow plant, something that would affect the outcome for Australian Iron & Steel.

=== Difficulties ===
==== Depression ====
The beginning of the Great Depression is usually held to be the October 1929 Wall Street crash. However, Australia was already experiencing the effects of declining export income, and higher unemployment, after the decision to return the pound sterling to the gold standard—the Australian pound was pegged to sterling—in 1925. By the time that the blast furnace had been lit in August 1928, the Australian economy was already in serious trouble, with worse to come in the following years. The timing for the new plant at Port Kembla could not have been worse. Production of rails was affected by constrained government spending, as most railways in Australia were government-owned. The depression brought lower volumes and lower prices for steel products, but the company was also able to lower wages significantly.

==== Breach of contract ====
An important part of the agreement with the N.S.W. Government was that the government built a railway line from Moss Vale to Unanderra. This new line allowed limestone from Marulan and dolomite from Mount Fairy to be carried by a more direct route, as well as providing a connection to ship the company's steel products via the main line to Melbourne. The construction of the railway had been delayed. By the time it opened in 1932, the additional 160 km of the original route had exposed the government to additional haulage costs; AI&S only paid freight costs for the direct route. Hoskins was required by the agreement to carry a minimum tonnage over the line. Reduced production, during the worst period of the depression, reduced tonnages below the minimum and the government sued AI&S. for breach of contract in 1932. It had to pay the government £25,000, in cash that it could hardly afford. Later, maintaining tonnages on this line was likely one reason that, in June 1935, the company was mining iron ore again at Breadalbane.

==== Competition and capability ====
BHP remained a formidable competitor for AI&S and its new plant. The relative scale of the operations was significant. BHP's Newcastle three blast furnaces could make 15,000 tons of iron per week, whereas Port Kembla's one large furnace could make 6,000 tons per week. Newcastle had its own troubles, in the early 1920s, and, for a time, it looked as if it might close. Appointed general manager, in 1921, Essington Lewis had revived the ailing Newcastle Steelworks. By the 1930s, it was a world leader in efficiency and well placed to face the Great Depression.

Lewis became managing director of BHP in 1926, He was one of the outstanding industrialists—Australian or otherwise—of his time. A blunt individual, nonetheless, Lewis worked well with BHP's chairman, sociable and suave Harold Darling. While differing in personality, neither man had time for frivolities, and both were focused on the business that they served in their different roles. The two became a formidable working combination, as well as close friends. Upon Darling's death in 1950, it was Lewis who succeeded him as BHP's chairman.

Hoskins, as chairman and co-managing director of Hoskins Iron and Steel, was occupying both the roles corresponding to those of Lewis and Darling, albeit in a smaller company. Comparing Hoskins to Lewis, it was Lewis who had achieved his position purely by proven ability, whereas Hoskins was the scion of the family, working in the family-owned company. Hoskins' lack of technical knowledge and experience in production —at least in a modern plant—contrasted with Lewis, a qualified mining engineer, who was across the detail of his operation and had proven himself at Newcastle. Understanding the benefits of using technical professionals within the industry, Lewis had set up a rigorous staff-training scheme, in 1927, and made attaining a relevant qualification a prerequisite for promotion of junior staff; in contrast, Hoskins had a lifelong wariness of tertiary-qualified professionals. Hoskins would prove no match for Lewis and Darling. However, in the end, it would be Lewis and Darling, who would save the day for him.

BHP had a number of subsidiary, part-owned subsidiary, and associated companies, which were both captive customers for its iron and steel and valuable partners bringing technical expertise of their own niche area of the industry. These arrangements were also a part of Essington Lewis's deliberate strategy to ensure volume for BHP and to constrain the growth of BHP's rival, Hoskins Iron and Steel. In particular, the alliance of BHP and John Lysaght resulted in a large market share in galvanised and corrugated steel sheet, a product with which the Hoskins' company had always struggled, but for which there was a strong local market. Against this, AI&S was undoubtedly predominant in the Hoskins' original specialty, iron pipes and steel pipes. Even in that market AI&S was threatened by the opening of Stewart & Lloyd's steel pipe plant—taking steel skelp from a new 10-inch merchant mill at BHP—at Newcastle, in 1934.

Although competition with BHP was inevitable to some extent, Hoskins strategy was to build his market share by displacing imported iron and steel from the Australian market. Under such a strategy, there could be room in the market for both local companies, without excessive competition on price. The economic conditions of the Great Depression severely challenged such an approach.

==== Sheet mill ====
AI&S needed to increase volume and margins. It ordered a modern American-designed sheet mill and galvanising plant.

The machinery for the new sheet mill was unloaded at the AI&S wharf on Monday 19 February 1934. In April, Hoskins was extolling the virtues of the new sheet mill and galvanising plant which was then being erected, while simultaneously defending the 'deferral' of dividends on preference shares. The expectation was that the new sheet mill would be in production by the end of 1934, and effectively AI&S' future was dependent upon the mill being a success.

However, the new sheet mill proved to be nothing but trouble for Hoskins, and it seems that he and his management were contributing to the problems. Around this time, AI&S had employed—as Assistant General Manager—one of the foremost engineers of the time, Gerald Haskins, who was a friend of Hoskins. It also employed two other engineers, Geoffrey Davey—to oversee installation of the new mill—and Frank Matthews. It seemed that Hoskins' and the company's aversion to university qualified engineers and metallurgists was abating. However, Haskins and Davey did not remain long, going into a consulting partnership together in 1935. Haskins' departure was almost certainly brought about by his disagreements with directors of the company. Hoskins and his management were still trying to run their more modern plant, in much the same way that they had learnt to do in their antiquated Lithgow plant.

It appears that pressure for results and interference in the new mill's operation, from the directors, Hoskins included, complicated the on-going teething troubles. A series of breakdowns occurred, followed by not always well-advised modifications, with the process repeated, and the equipment suffering increasingly severe breakdowns. There were troubles with broken or damaged rolls. The end result was that the new mill only achieved intermittent production. A catastrophic failure of a main gearbox, not protected by a suitably sized shear-coupling arrangement, was one salient incident. The gearbox failure also featured as the climax of the narrative set out in an anonymously authored document, Not Enough Cooks; it made a thinly veiled criticism of ill-informed interference by the directors—without naming the company, using fictional names for individuals, and calling the sheet mill a 'plate mill'—but leaving little doubt about whom the author thought was to blame, the two Hoskins brothers.

As the mill was later resurrected and operated successfully, by John Lysaght after 1936, it is apparent that lack of technical and operational expertise was a major factor in its failure while it was under AI&S ownership.

As if events were conspiring against Hoskins, in April 1935, the Tariff Board were stating that the existing level of protection against imported sheet steel was too high, potentially lowering the margin on the product, if and when Hoskins' company could make it consistently.

==== Iron ore ====
AI&S' contract with BHP for the supply of iron ore was due to expire in July 1938, with no option to renew. Hoskins would then need to bring or buy ore from some other source.

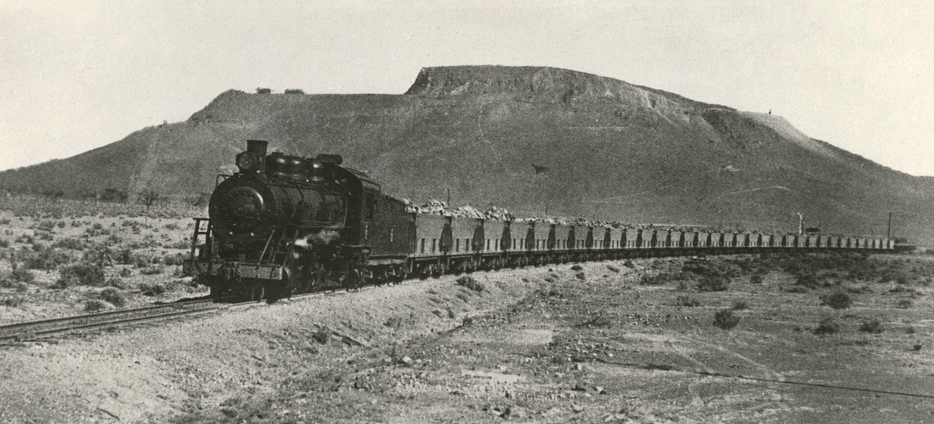
Train from Iron Knob, BHP's large iron ore mine in South Australia, and a mountain of iron ore, Iron Monarch, in 1935.

Much hope was placed in a lease that the company held over a large but remote iron ore deposit on Cockatoo Island, in Yampi Sound, and later secured leases over deposits on the neighbouring Koolan Island. The company bought a schooner, 'Geraldton', carried out survey work on Cockatoo Island in 1929 and 1930, and built some accommodation buildings and a reservoir on the island in 1932. The housing was deserted by May 1934. Hoskins tried to obtain financial support, from Japanese mining interests, to develop the Yampi Sound ore deposits—some of the ore was to be exported to Japan—but discussions apparently broke down in early 1935. Complicating the difficulties of developing the remote deposit, the ore from Cockatoo Island was difficult to smelt, without blending with some other ore. The search for ores to blend may be one reason that, June 1935, the company was mining ore again at Breadalbane.

A deposit at Savage River in Tasmania was considered too difficult to develop. Ore sources in New South Wales were small, widely dispersed, and necessitated costly transport by rail, a major reason for relocating the Lithgow works to the Port Kembla, where ore from other sources could be unloaded.

There appeared to be no way forward, beyond July 1938, other than to deal with the company's main local competitor. BHP thus already had significant leverage over AI&S. After the debacle of the sheet mill, the dependence on BHP for iron ore, perhaps, was what planted the seed of the merger in Hoskins' mind.

==== Energy ====
The Port Kembla plant relied on coke from its coke ovens at Wongawilli—originally built to supply the old Lithgow Steelworks—but their distance from Port Kembla meant that the company could not harvest and use, to fuel the reheating furnaces of its rolling mills, the coke ovens gas produced during the coking process. There were 80 coke ovens at Wongawilli, and Hoskins added another 40, in 1927, in preparation for the opening of the Port Kembla blast furnace.

The only gas that Port Kembla produced was low calorific-value blast furnace off-gas, much of which was needed for the blast furnace itself. Hoskins had added more coke ovens, but at Wongawilli, not Port Kembla. The absence of coke ovens, at the Port Kembla steelworks, was a more serious omission than it might have at first appeared.

==== Running a public company ====
Until AI&S, the Hoskins enterprises were family-owned and did not need to worry about ordinary and preference shareholders. Hoskins was not accustomed to the level of comment and scrutiny associated with running a listed company. The new company gave its first report in April 1929. In June 1929, AI&S offered another 600,000 ordinary shares, in an effort to raise more capital in cash. The company managed to pay the 7.5% dividend owing to its preference shareholders in 1928, 1929 and 1930, but could not maintain these payments, as its profits dived, coinciding with the most critical phase of the establishing of its steelmaking operation at Port Kembla.

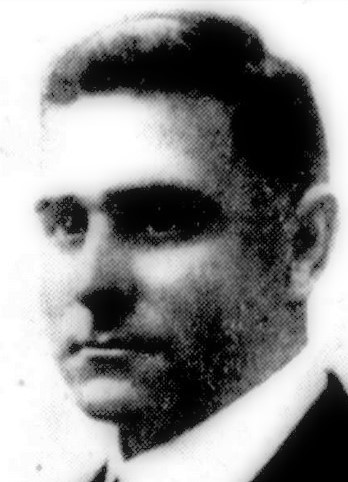
Cecil Hoskins, c.1935.

By the time that operations were fully transferred to Port Kembla, in 1932, there was dissatisfaction from shareholders. The way the company was reporting its results was criticised. There was a capital loss on the preference shares, with the cumulative deferral of £75,000 of distributions on those shares, which continued to increase in subsequent years. Paradoxically, it would be Hoskin's political enemy, N.S.W. Premier Jack Lang, who would help to limit the growth of this arrears amount, in 1931, by the Interest Reduction Act. This legislation limited preference share dividends to a 5% dividend or the original rate discounted by 22.5%, whichever was the higher, except where the company concerned had an excess of undistributed profits. The latter provision was definitely not relevant to AI&S, which made profits of a mere £18,070 in 1931 and, even worse, only £2,203 in 1932.

In 1934, when Hoskins described 1933 as the 'best since 1930'—without detailing at the time what the profit actually was— the 1933 profit had actually rebounded to £70,359, still only a 2.1% return on capital and still without any dividend paid. By April 1934, the amount in arrears dividends owing to preference shareholders had risen to £188,437. Finally, in April 1935, Hoskins announced that the company would pay a distribution on its preference shares; the one that had been due for the half year to the end of May 1931.

Australian Iron and Steel Limited had been in existence for seven years, by 1935, and had not paid a dividend to ordinary shareholders. It came close in 1929, when it declared a 5% dividend—from its highest ever profit of £215,040—but that dividend was withheld once economic conditions worsened. The ordinary share dividend drought also affected the incomes of the wider Hoskins family, the many descendants of Charles Hoskins. Hoskins, generally, could rely upon the support of his wider family, but there had to be a limit.

There was another issue as well; not all the ordinary shares of the company were fully-paid to their face value of £1. While this left the company with a source of untapped additional capital, resistance to a call on those 950,000 partly-paid shares could be expected from shareholders who were not receiving dividends and facing potential capital losses on their shares. Nonetheless, in the 1933–1934 financial year, the company called up £150,000 from the holders of its partly-paid ordinary shares, which it needed to fund its new sheet mill, among other things.

In April 1935, the generally held perception was that the company's fortunes had turned the corner, and better days were ahead. Hoskins was not candid with the public, or his shareholders, about the troubles at the sheet mill, the actual profit outlook, or about the other difficulties the company faced. Sooner or later, these matters would have become public knowledge, strained relations with shareholders even further, and probably damaged Hoskins' reputation. The subsequent merger with BHP was to solve these problems elegantly.

=== BHP merger ===
Rumours that a merger was in train began circulating in August 1935, but initially were deflected, without comment, by both Hoskins and Harold Darling of BHP. Hoskins visited the BHP Newcastle works, ostensibly to look over the plant, then celebrating its 20th anniversary. In fact, the merger had been discussed and agreed around that time. The BHP board announced the conclusion of negotiations, in mid-October 1935.

With interest concentrated on the merger, AI&S did not report its half-year result in November 1935. In December 1935, all 2,700,007 ordinary shares in AI&S were acquired by BHP in exchange for 750,000 BHP ordinary shares, and AI&S became a subsidiary of BHP. A condition of the merger was that all partly-paid ordinary shares were fully-paid prior to the exchange. Preference shares in AI&S continued to trade until 1959. The Hoskins family became significant shareholders of BHP.

Hoskins himself would attribute the merger solely to the effects of the depression. Probably that was a rationalisation of a more uncomfortable truth; ultimately, albeit after much time and great effort, the grand plans for Australian Iron & Steel—the vision of Charles Hoskins—had ended in failure. Cecil Hoskins had been somewhat out of his depth, and it was time to hand over the enterprise to those who could run it better than he could.

=== After the merger with BHP ===
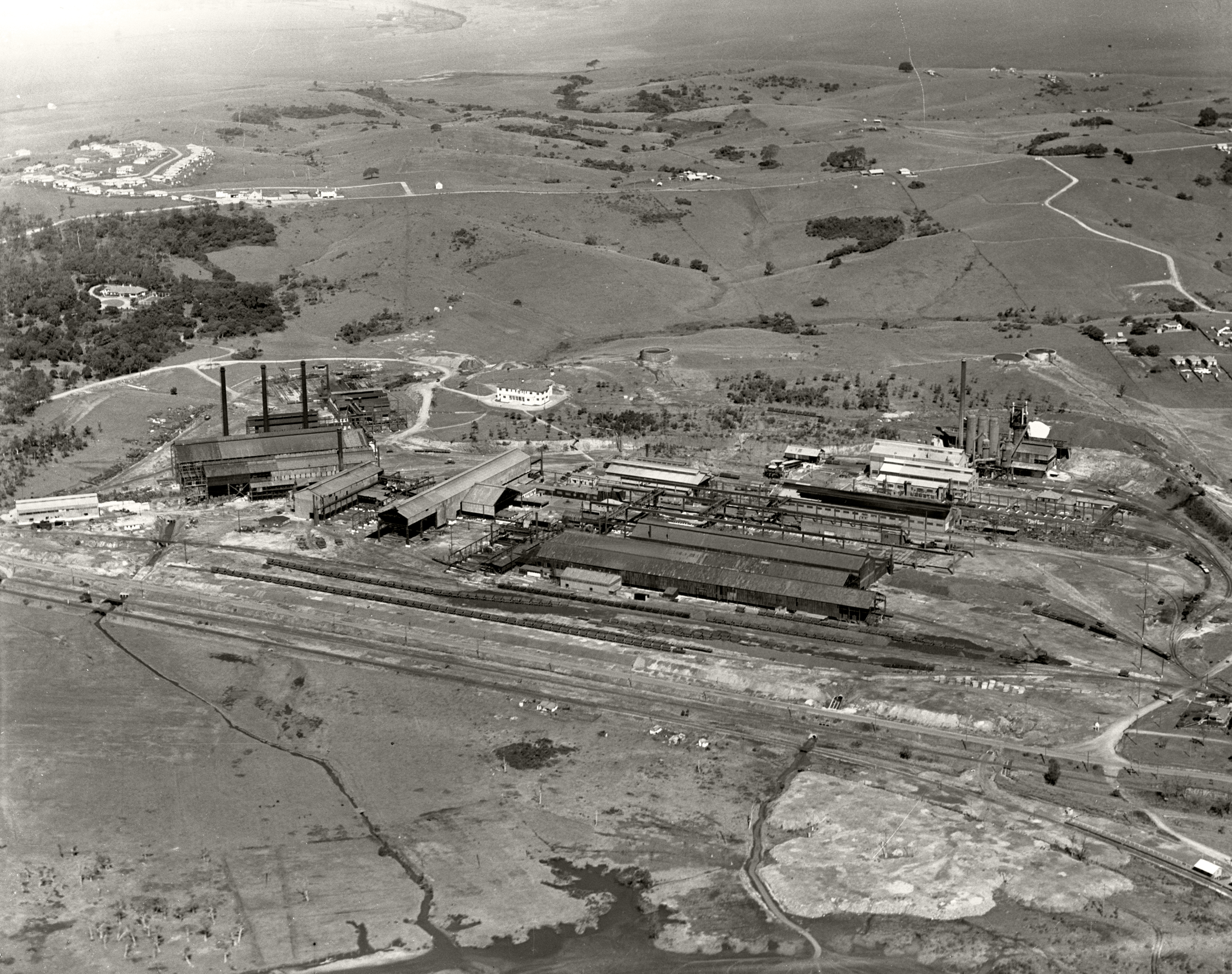
Hoskins Kembla Works in 1936 just after the merger with BHP. Left: open-hearth steelmaking plant and to its right the Administration Building. Centre: rolling mills. Right-rear: blast furnace.

The board of AI&S was altered to reflect the new ownership of the company, and Harold Darling became its chairman. It was this new board, who delivered the bad news, in March 1936 of AI&S's 33% fall in half-year profit, and in November 1936, of a half-year loss.

BHP for its part was magnanimous. Hoskins was given the role of general manager at Port Kembla. He and Sid Hoskins remained directors of what was, by then, a subsidiary company, Australian Iron and Steel Ltd. In a gesture of recognition to the Hoskins family, the BHP board gave Port Kembla steelworks the official name of 'Hoskins Kembla Works.' However, Hoskins was not asked to join the board of BHP; it had been a merger, but not a merger of equals.

As a significant BHP shareholder who had exchanged his family's shares in a less profitable business for those of a more profitable one, Hoskins' role was now diminished and less prestigious, but more secure. Although it took some years for BHP to recover its investment in Port Kembla, protected by a tariff, it was soon making record profits. By 1938, BHP would be paying a 12.5% dividend on its ordinary shares

The troublesome sheet mill was transferred to John Lysaght, in April 1936; it was expected to add about 20% to the 100,000 tons of galvanised sheet that Lysaght was already making at Newcastle each year. Within a relatively short time, John Lysaght had the mill working properly. However, the agreement, under which the mill was transferred to Lysaght, stipulated that Lysaght would build a new plant at Port Kembla, with twice the nominal capacity of the AI&S sheet mill and galvanising plant. Lysaght shutdown the sheet mill in 1938, completing a new plant, its Springhill Works, nearby in 1939.

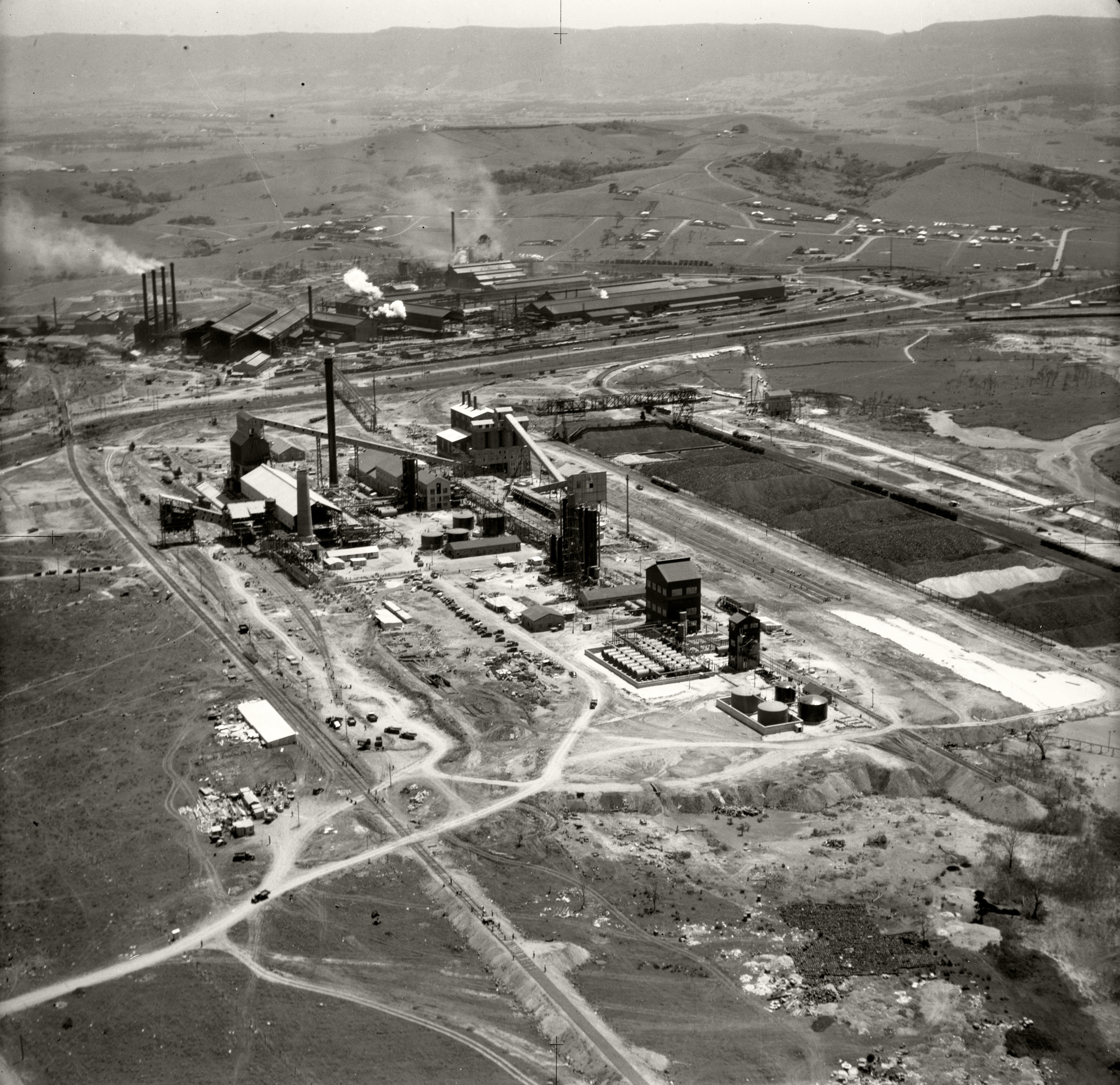
Foreground, construction of the new coke and byproducts plant at Port Kembla, with original Hoskins' steelworks in background. (November 1937)

In September 1936, it was announced that coke ovens would be built at Port Kembla, producing not only coke for the plant, but also the high calorific-value coke ovens gas needed to fuel its processes, and various coal tar and volatile byproducts. These new ovens went into operation in 1938, and, while the coal washery at Wongawill remained in operation, the ovens there closed immediately. The old ovens were recommissioned, during Second World War, to boost coke production, but were closed, in 1945, and demolished.

By 1937, a global shortage of steel, encouraged BHP to raise more capital and to expand Port Kembla. A second and more-modern merchant mill, second blast furnace and third steel furnace were added, then a billet mill. The expansions effectively doubled the pre-merger capacity of the works. Also in 1937, BHP purchased the Bulli Colliery increasing the amount of prime coking coal available to Port Kembla's new coke ovens.

The additional capacity would help replace the declining revenues from BHP's first business, its mine at Broken Hill. The expansion also came just in time, as the Port Kembla steelworks became a critical strategic industry for Australia during the Second World War, much as the old Lithgow works had been during the First World War.

Unlike Lithgow, Port Kembla's coastal location made it vulnerable to an enemy attack from the sea, and local volunteers manned coastal batteries, searchlights and anti-aircraft guns that were deployed to protect it. A Japanese reconnaissance aeroplane flew over Port Kembla, in February 1943, and Japanese submarines sank ships off the coast, but the plant was not attacked.

A shortage of shipping and the risk of enemy attacks on ore carriers, led to the wartime reopening of the old Hoskins' ore quarry at Cadia and its branch railway—together with other ore quarries in New South Wales, including another Hoskins quarry at Breadalbane—to keep Port Kembla's two blast furnaces working. Hoskins' knowledge of the old ore mines was put to use during this time. However, the old ore deposit at Coombing Park, near Carcoar, was not mined again, apparently showing that Hoskins was not one to forget an old dispute.

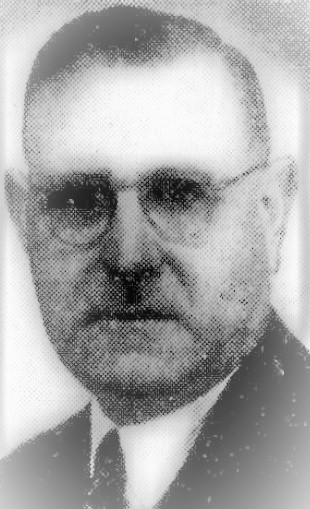
Cecil Hoskins c.1950

The Kembla Building was sold in 1946 and, presumably, the proceeds flowed to the Hoskins family. In 1947, the Hoskins family held the second largest individual shareholding in BHP (348,719 shares).

In early 1949, Hoskins took leave and travelled overseas, after a family tragedy. Then, from August 1949 to June 1950, he was on an extended overseas business trip, visiting United States, Canada, England and the Continent, "where he inspected most of the major steelmaking plants to investigate latest methods of manufacture". During the 1950s, the Port Kembla plant underwent a huge expansion. After the war ended, development of the AI&S leases at Cockatoo Island started and, in 1951, iron ore mining began there.

Hoskins retired as general manager of Port Kembla steelworks, in December 1950. Hoskins remained a director of AI&S until 1959. Also in 1959, the owners of AI&S preference shares—still trading on the Sydney Stock Exchange at the time—accepted BHP's offer and all the preference shares were converted to ordinary BHP shares. By then, Hoskins' sons and other relatives were no longer working in the industry, and the era of the Hoskins family's involvement in the iron and steel industry—except as shareholders—was over.

== Other business interests, politics and public life ==
Hoskins' first business roles, outside the family business, was as a local director of Royal Insurance Co. Ltd and as a director of the United Insurance Co. Ltd. He relinquished those positions as his role at AI&S became more demanding of his time. He was chairman of Southern Portland Cement Ltd from 1928 to 1957.

At the height of his time as a captain of industry, in May 1929, he became a director of Australian Mutual Provident Society. In 1941, he became Deputy Chairman of AMP and then, in 1947, he took over from Sir Samuel Hordern as Chairman. He stood down as Chairman in 1962, but remained a director during 1962, after which he retired from the board.

Like his father, Charles Hoskins, he was a protectionist and a council member of the Chamber of Manufactures of N.S.W. (from 1925 to 1946). However, unlike his father, he became directly involved in party politics. The spur to his involvement appears to have been his disquiet at the second government of Jack Lang. He was an executive member of a short-lived political movement, the All for Australia League, which opposed both the Australian Labor Party and—at least initially—the Nationalist Party. He subsequently was involved in the formation of the United Australia Party, which absorbed both the Nationalist Party and All for Australia League, in 1931. He was a friend of Robert Menzies. He was also a chairman of the Institute of Public Affairs (New South Wales), in which role he could exert financial leverage, by means of fund raising, over the NSW UAP organisation. The UAP was absorbed by the Liberal Party, in 1945, and Hoskins attempted to once again exert similar financial leverage over the new party. However, the NSW Liberal Party decided instead that it would raise all of its funds itself. Hoskins then served as a Councillor and Chairman of the Consultative Council of the new party.

He was a keen supporter of the scouting movement, dating from 1924, the start of his period as chairman of the 1st Edgecliff scout troop. Around the time of his retirement in 1950, he was President of the South Coast & Tablelands Area Scout Council.

Hoskins received a knighthood in the Queen's Birthday honours list of 1960. He was made a Knight Bachelor in recognition of his important contribution to Australian industrial and pastoral development.

== Family, homes and gardens ==
Hoskins grew up in a large family, as the second son of a prosperous industrialist, Charles Hoskins. Three of his siblings—Hilda, Nellie, and Henry Guildford—died by 1916, and are commemorated by the Hoskins Memorial Church at Lithgow. The garden of that church was designed and planted by landscape gardener Paul Sorensen. It was as head of the family that Hoskins handed over the completed church in November 1928.

He was close to and had a lifelong working connection with his supportive younger brother Arthur Sidney (Sid) Hoskins (1892–1959). Sid would work with Hoskins in the steel industry, from 1908 until 1949, when he retired, later taking up grazing with his son Phillip, in South Australia. The two men worked so closely together, that they were referred to, at Port Kembla, as 'Mr Cecil' and 'Mr Sid'; quite different in personality, but almost two parts of the same person. Hoskins was seen as having inherited his father's hard-edged approach to his workers. Sid was seen as the more approachable of the two, and was known for his generosity, involvement in the local community, and quiet philanthropy.

Also part of his extended family were Jeannie Hoskins (née Mathieson), widow of Hoskins' elder brother, Henry Guildford Hoskins, their daughter, Lynette, and son, also Henry Guildford.

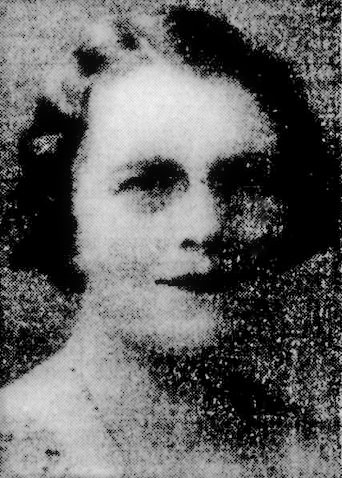
Dorothy Hoskins, c.1935.

Hoskins married Dorothy Gwynne Loveridge in 1913. His brother, Sid, married her sister Helen Madoline (Madge) in 1917. Dorothy and Madge were daughters of a prominent Sydney stone mason and master-builder, Thomas Loveridge. The company that Thomas Loveridge part owned, Loveridge and Hudson, among many other projects, constructed the Long Gully suspension bridge at Northbridge and the Hampden suspension bridge in Kangaroo Valley, both with extensive sandstone suspension towers, and it operated a trachyte quarry near Bowral, from which stone for many of Sydney's major buildings was sourced. Like the two Hoskins brothers, their wives, the two Loveridge sisters, came from a wealthy family background.

From early in her marriage to Hoskins, Dorothy, was involved in charitable causes in Lithgow and somewhat of a nascent socialite. Later, while living in Sydney she was associated with the Sydney City Mission—a charity that had been associated with her mother-in-law, Emily Hoskins—and was the president of its Ladies Committee from 1929.

The couple had six children, Robert Arthur (1914–1985), Kenneth Charles (1915–?), Donald Geoffrey (1917–2008), Hugh John (1918–?), Elaine (1921–?), and Emily Marjorie (Marjorie) (1923–2015)

Of his children, his three elder sons, Robert, Donald and Kenneth, followed Hoskins into the steel industry at Port Kembla, but none of them seemed to stay working in it for long after the end of the Second World War. Intriguingly, in his book The Hoskins Saga, Hoskins wrote that none of his children followed him into the industry, a statement that is apparently incorrect. In 1937, not long after the merger, both Robert and Kenneth were in Newcastle, where Robert was married in 1940. Hoskins' fourth son, Hugh was a pilot during the Second World War, and afterwards lived at Goulburn. His youngest daughter, Marjorie, was a notable Sydney identity; she was described, at the time of her death, as "one of the last of Sydney's Grandes Dames."

Hoskins family's first home near Lithgow was 'Windarra', which lay close to Eskroy Park, home of Charles Hoskins. Originally a small cottage, Charles Hoskins had it rebuilt as a sizable family home, while his son and new bride were overseas.

The Hoskins family home in Sydney, from 1924 to 1933, was 'Hillside', a 27-room mansion, of the 'Rustic Gothic' architectural style, in Edgecliff Road, Woollahra. The family let 'Hillside' in 1933, and moved to 'Deepdene', at Killara. In 1935, 'Hillside' was demolished and replaced with what is still a notable 1930s apartment building of the same name. Its name would reappear, as one of the company executive accommodation houses at Figtree.

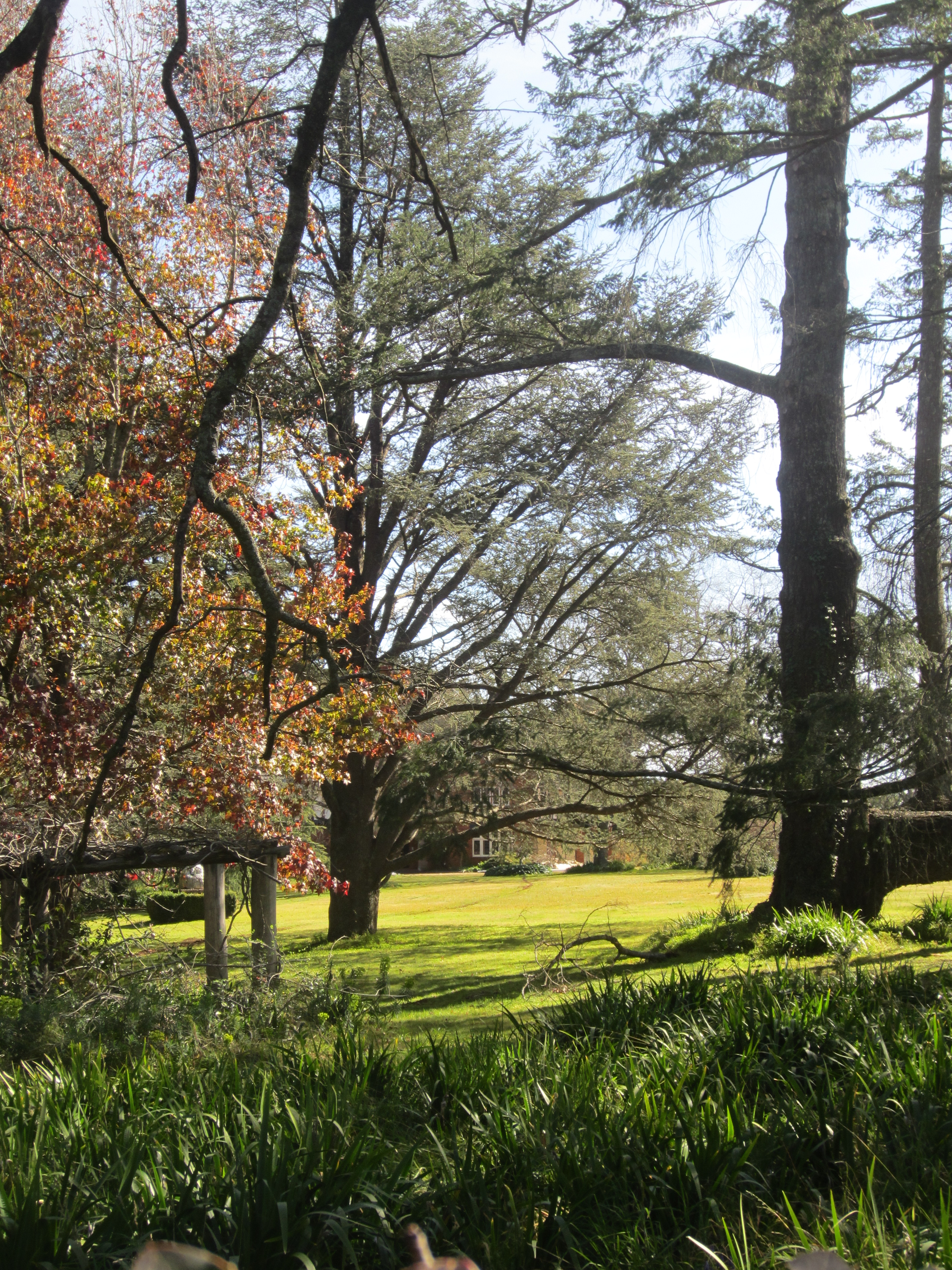
'Invergowrie', part of the garden, with the house in background (Sept. 2020)

In 1929, Hoskins bought an estate at Exeter—from the deceased estate of Arthur Yates—not long after the sale of his father's former home 'Ashton'. He had a house named 'Invergowrie' built on the estate in 1936. The house is in the style of 'Tudor revival'—a controversial style today, sometimes disparagingly called 'Stockbroker Tudor'—but was regarded as one of the finest houses in the state at the time. The architect was Geoffrey Loveridge, Hoskin's brother-in-law. Hoskins employed Paul Sorensen to create a beautiful park-like landscaped garden. Mrs Hoskins hosted a housewarming garden party there in October 1937.

Hoskins' younger daughter Marjorie married businessman Jock Pagan, in December 1948. Their reception was held at 'Invergowrie' with 260 guests. It was one of the last happy family events at the house. Hoskins sold 'Invergowrie', in 1949, following the drowning of one of his grandsons, in the swimming pool, less than a month after the wedding. When 'Invergowrie' was sold, the sale also included three other Hoskins properties, 'Tottenham' a 1,154 acre cattle stud at St Marys, 'Angora Farm,' an 87 acre orchard at Windsor, and a 170 acre dairy farm on the North Coast.

His subsequent and last home was, 'Cardrona', on Kater Road, near Moss Vale. 'Cardrona' was a more modest house than 'Invergowrie', better suited to a retired couple with no children living at home. It was nonetheless a large Edwardian house of 74 squares (7,400 square feet) in floor area, set in 89 hectares of pasture. Hoskins designed his own garden and had it planted by Sorensen, who had become a personal friend.

Hoskins also involved Sorensen in other landscape garden projects, including the gardens at Berrima Cement Works, Mt Kiera Scout Camp, the planting of a section of the Remembrance Drive (Old Hume Highway) near Berrima, the executive accommodation houses 'Green Hills' and 'Hillside', and his brother Sid's house, Gleniffer Brae. Hoskins was also responsible for the planning and development of Seymour Park, area of 9 acres, in Moss Vale.

== Death and legacy ==
Hoskins died at his home at Moss Vale on 8 March 1971. His wife Dorothy died in 1982; she and her sister Madge both lived long enough to attend the fiftieth anniversary of the Hoskins Memorial Church at Lithgow.

His main legacy was the relocation of the steel industry from Lithgow, to Port Kembla, where in due course it was to thrive, albeit by then no longer under Hoskins family control. The sheet mill that has caused Hoskins so much pain was taken over by Lysaght in 1936, and was soon producing successfully. Lysaght later replaced it by a larger new plant. The expansion would lead Lysaght to concentrate its production of sheet steel at Port Kembla, a decision that would lead in turn to expansion of the neighbouring AI&S steelworks. Port Kembla both outgrew and outlived its rival plant at Newcastle and, now owned by BlueScope, is still the largest steel producer in Australia. Hoskins' company was also the first to attempt to exploit the iron ore resources of Western Australia, which have since become the basis of an immense export industry.

Hoskins is remembered by the Cecil Hoskins Nature Reserve, and his passion for landscape gardens resulted in a number of notable surviving gardens and parks.

Hoskins authored a book, 'The Hoskins Saga', about his family. In significant parts of his book, he is spoken of in the third person, except when he is narrating events in which he was involved in a personal sense. It conveys little of his personal feelings, about his own life and work. It fails to even mention the infamous sheet mill and as well glosses over the critical period prior to the merger with BHP. The book was compiled with much input from a manager at Port Kembla, Augustus 'Gus' Parish (1912–1967), and Hoskins' long-term secretary, Bessie Foskett. However, it does provide a unique and detailed description of iron and steel making at Lithgow, as it was in the years immediately after the Hoskins took control. His son Donald's book, The Ironmaster, presents a franker view of Hoskin's time and the family's involvement in the steel industry. Donald Hoskins left an extensive collection of material on that subject matter.

The Kembla Building, for a decade the headquarters of Hoskins' business, in Sydney, was demolished in 1978.

The old Hoskins 36-inch mill at Port Kembla continued working into the early 1980s—still with one of its stands being driven by a massive Galloway steam engine—until rail and structural steel production were consolidated, at the Whyalla Steelworks in South Australia. Apart from the old No.1 Merchant Mill, a preserved steam locomotive (Wallaby), and some old buildings in the steelworks, it was one of the last surviving relics of the Hoskins' years.

== See also ==
- Australian Iron & Steel
