= Gerald Haskins =

New Zealand-born engineer who worked mainly in Australia

Gerald Haskins (c. 1885–1946) was a New Zealand-born and educated civil engineer, who worked for much of his career in Australia. He was one of the three original principals of the consulting engineering firm Gutteridge Haskins and Davey, which continues today in the form of the GHD Group.

== Early life and career in New Zealand ==
Haskins was born in 1885 or 1886 at Papanui, a suburb of Christchurch, on the South Island of New Zealand. He was the son of Francis Thomas Haskins (c. 1830–1908) and his wife Elizabeth, née Gosling, (c. 1850–1909).

Haskins' father was the Town Clerk of Christchurch; he had nominated the fields in which his three sons and one daughter would become qualified and in which all four did qualify. In young Gerald's case, it was engineering. He studied and graduated as a civil engineer at Canterbury College, University of New Zealand (now University of Canterbury). He had grown to be around six feet tall and well proportioned. While at university, Haskins excelled at amateur boxing and was captain of the football team.

After graduating, he first worked at Lyttelton Harbour, but left New Zealand to work in Australia, around 1911, initially returning each year during his leave to visit his girlfriend and future wife.

== Career in Australia ==
=== Water supply engineer ===
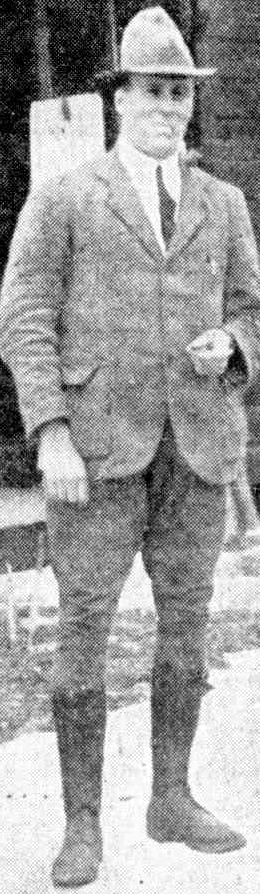
Gerald Haskins at Avon Dam site (1920)

His first job in Australia was with the N.S.W. Department of Public Works at Wagga—he was resident engineer for the town's new sewerage works in 1912—and later he worked with them in Sydney. He then worked for the Hunter District Water Supply and Sewerage Board, as Assistant Engineer, based in Newcastle, from around 1917. He supervised the construction of Newcastle Reservoir No.2, completing it, in 1918, at below the estimated cost. He was also a part of the efforts to capture enough water to meet the growing city's needs, pending the completion of the Chichester Dam.

He returned to Public Works, as resident engineer for the construction of the Avon Dam, from 1920 to 1927. During this time he reported to the legendary civil engineer, Ernest de Burgh, who oversaw the entire Upper Nepean Scheme. Haskins had to manage the building and ongoing operation of a temporary town, with a population of over 1000, as well as managing the construction of the large dam itself. He established a good working relationship with Jock Garden, the powerful, left-wing Secretary of the Labour Council of New South Wales, and managed the site work without significant industrial disruption.

=== Chief Engineer of the Water Board ===
In October 1927, Haskins was appointed as the Chief Engineer of the Metropolitan Water Sewerage and Drainage Board, commonly known as the Water Board. He had not actually applied for the position but had been nominated for it, by the President of the Water Board, after the death of the incumbent. Being seen as an 'outsider', his appointment resulted in significant resentment. By December 1927, he had decided to remain with Public Works. However, he apparently relented and subsequently accepted the position. He called together the senior staff who, having been passed over for promotion, were the source of the resentment against him, and persuaded them to desist.

Haskins is credited with the design of the Woronora Dam. Work commenced in 1927, but construction was interrupted by the Great Depression and was not completed until 1941.

The politician, Sir Thomas Henley, had been a member of the Water Board, for much of the time after 1903. From around 1930 to 1932, he clashed with Haskins over the need to continue the construction of the Nepean Dam, Henley preferred to direct funds to installing water mains, to connect more customers sooner to reticulated water, rather than spend it on the dam. Work on the dam was suspended in March 1930, due to the impact of the Great Depression. However, Haskins' opinion eventually prevailed. Not only did work on the project resume in 1933, but Haskins had, soon after his appointment as chief engineer, persuaded the Water Board to increase the dam height by 25 ft (7.6m), increasing the dam's capacity by nearly 50%. The dam was completed in September 1935, the fourth and last dam of the Upper Nepean Scheme.

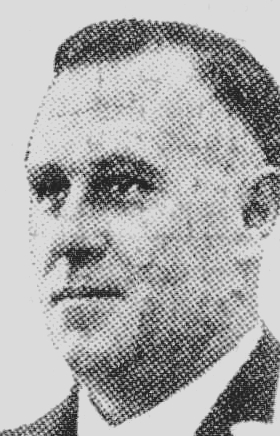
Gerald Haskins c. 1931

From around 1922 to 1930, a pressure tunnel—still the third largest in the world—was constructed to carry water from the Potts Hill Reservoirs to a pumping station at Waterloo. When the concrete tunnel was pressure tested, it failed the test. It and another pressure tunnel crossing of the Parramatta River became the impetus for a Royal Commission into the Water Board in 1932–33. Haskins gave technical evidence defending the design of his predecessor, J. G. S. Purvis. He responded robustly to another witness, Sir Thomas Henley, who accused Haskins of negligence, despite the design of the tunnel and the commencement of its construction predating Haskin's appointment. It seems that Henley's attitude, by his own admission, stemmed from the circumstance of Haskins' appointment as chief engineer, and how for "at least three years he declared he had opposed the enormous waste in the board's engineering works and the discharge of the board's own trained men who were superseded by university-trained theorists, juniors from Public Works Department, and former associates of Mr Haskins." It was a deeply personal, acrimonious, and very unpleasant public dispute. Henley sued two fellow board members for damages in 1932; he was not re-elected to the Water Board in February 1933, and withdrew the legal action in June 1933.

A decision was taken, in June 1933, to line the entire length of the pressure tunnel with bituminous-lined steel pipe embedded in concrete, which allowed it to pass the pressure test. This work was completed by late 1935, and the much-delayed tunnel was a resounding success. The solution had been proposed by Haskins in 1930, and endorsed by two prominent Australian civil engineers of the time, Edgar Ritchie and Henry Dare.

Until the 1920s, it had been usual to use iron pipes or even wood-stave pipes for water distribution, because welded-steel pipes corroded too quickly. In the United States ductile-iron pipes had been lined with cement-mortar. Haskins was among the first to see the potential of linings to allow large welded-steel pipes to be used. Haskins had encouraged one of the Water Board's engineers, S. T. Farnsworth, to experiment with the use of bituminous linings of welded-steel pipes. The two had sought and obtained permission from the Water Board to patent the process, giving the Water Board free use of their process, taken out a patent, and set up a companies to exploit it, Haskins Patent Pipe Linings Limited and Pipe Linings (Australasia) Limited.

Haskins had encouraged another engineer, William Tate, to experiment with the cement-mortar lining of steel pipes. Tate applied for a patent in 1931, but in 1932, Haskins opposed the patent, contending that Tate's process only covered lining pipes before installation, whereas Haskins claimed he himself had invented the process that allowed lining of pipes in situ. The matter went to the High Court, in April 1935 and it found in Tate's favour. Eventually, both 'Tate' and 'Haskins' processes were patented, and a company, Cement Linings Ltd, was set up to line pipes. In recognition that both men were working for the Water Board at the time of the experimental work, the Water Board was given free use of the process, but they had not asked the Water Board for its agreement to take out patents in their own names. (Over time, free use of the cement-mortar lining process was estimated to have saved the Water Board millions of pounds in construction costs.)

The commercial arrangements relating to the patents and the pipe lining ventures came within the scope of Royal Commission looking into the Water Board, adding to Haskin's woes.

The findings of the Royal Commission included that the design of the original pressure tunnel was faulty, as was the location and design of a similar pressure tunnel crossing of the Parramatta River. The findings were critical of Haskins' design of the remedial works—finding that he had made "errors of judgement"—and his and Farnsworth's holding "a financial interest in a patent which might conceivably have been an influence upon the discharge of their official duties".

Even though the Water Board praised the remedial actions he had underway, Haskins retired from his position as chief engineer, in June 1933. He was still defending the design engineers who were criticised by the Royal Commission and, by taking that stance and after being himself criticised by the Royal Commission, he had little option but to leave, as a matter of principle. Further, if he had stayed, his own choice of bituminous-lined welded-steel pipes for the remediation of the two tunnels—with the additional cost of the remediation, £955,000 and with associated delays—was likely to cause more controversy.

At the time he retired as chief engineer in June 1933, he was described by members of the Water Board as "one of Australia's great water engineers" and one board member stated, that Haskins had been lost to the Water Board because of "unfair tactics and much unjust criticism"; another said, "Mr Haskins had placed the water supply of Sydney on a safe and enduring basis." The success of the remediated pressure tunnel in 1935 and the completion of the Nepean Dam in the same year removed doubt about his reputation as a prominent and successful civil engineer. Haskins' nemesis, the increasingly erratic Sir Thomas Henley, fell from a Manly ferry and drowned, in May 1935; a coroner's inquest found that his death was accidental, although there is some evidence suggesting it was a suicide.

=== Steel industry ===
Haskins was a friend of Cecil Hoskins, chairman and managing director of Australian Iron & Steel. The Hoskins family's fortune was originally built from the manufacture of iron and steel pipes. They had been major suppliers to the Water Board, and to other water supply ventures, since the 1890s. In 1908, they had taken over the ailing William Sandford Limited, and entered the iron and steel industry. From 1927 to 1932, Hoskins had been overseeing the progressive relocation of the company's operations from Lithgow to Port Kembla, where a new steelworks was built.

In 1933, having resigned from the Water Board, Haskins was appointed as an Assistant General Manager of the new steelworks at Port Kembla. Employment of a university-qualified engineer was an unusual development; Cecil Hoskins and many of those in his company's management were unconvinced of any benefits of a university education, something that in the longer term was detrimental to them and probably something difficult for Haskins to overcome in his new role.

His younger colleague from earlier days, Geoffrey Davey, was also put in charge of the installation of the company's new sheet mill. At the time, Australian Iron & Steel was facing serious difficulties, and it would merge with BHP in late 1935. Both Haskins and Davey had left, by 1935, when they set up an engineering consultancy practice in Sydney. Haskins' departure was almost certainly brought about by his disagreements with directors of the company.

=== Consulting engineer - Haskins & Davey ===
After the difficult interlude at Port Kembla and vindicated by the successful pressure tunnel remediation, Haskins was ready for fresh challenges. He and Geoffrey Davey began their practice as consulting engineers, Haskins & Davey, around September 1935, working from an office in 'Asbestos House', an art-deco building at 65 York St, Sydney.

Many towns were implementing schemes for reticulated water supplies and sewerage, and the practice was an immediate success. Notably, it provided advice for the later stages of the South West Tablelands Water Supply Scheme and later the Central Tablelands Water Supply Scheme, but for many other places as well.

=== Gutteridge, Haskins & Davey ===
Haskins & Davey had been working on some projects with the Melbourne-based practice of A. Gordon Gutteridge, established in 1928. Both practices saw the potential for work in Queensland and it was there that the two practices, working together, would first use the name 'Gutteridge, Haskins and Davey', in early 1937. On 1 January 1939, the two practices were officially combined, under the newly incorporated entity, Gutteridge, Haskins and Davey.

Gutteridge died in 1942 and also in 1942, Haskins retired, leaving Geoffrey Davey as the only original principal of the company.

== Family and later life ==
Haskins had met Dorothy Stanisland in New Zealand, before he came to Australia. For three years he returned on his annual leave to see her, before the couple were married in Sydney in 1913. Their homes followed Haskins' jobs, including seven years living in a 'comfortable bungalow' in the temporary town at the Avon dam construction site. Four of their six children survived childhood: John (1917–1992), Geoffrey (b.1922), Phillip (b.1924), and Janet (b.1934). Their first child, a daughter, was stillborn at eight months, following a motor accident, and an infant daughter, Betty, died after catching poliomyelitis.

After Haskins retirement, in 1942, the couple moved to a property known as 'Clear Hills', at Duckmaloi near Oberon, where they became well-respected members of the rural community. Their eldest son, John, became a prisoner-of-war of the Japanese, and the couple had no news of his fate for three years. During that time, the farm was worked with the assistance of six Italian prisoners-of-war, who were treated well by the Haskins family. Haskins was to live long enough to see his son return from captivity, in September 1945, but was in poor health by 1946.

== Death and legacy ==
Haskins died on 21 November 1946, following an operation at the Mater Hospital in North Sydney.

Dorothy Haskins died in 1985, severing the last connection between the original principals and the company that they founded. No longer known as Gutteridge, Haskins and Davey, the GHD Group is now a global professional services practice, owned by its employees. The "H' in its newer name is from Haskins.

Many of the water supply and sewerage projects that Haskins' efforts advanced still operate today—notably the Avon Dam, the Nepean Dam, the Woronora Dam, the Potts Hill pressure tunnel, and many towns' water and sewerage systems—and have been of lasting value to their communities.
