= Gordon Gutteridge =

Australian civil engineer (1892–1942)

Alan Gordon Gutteridge (4 February 1892 – February 1942) was an Australian civil engineer and a founder of Gutteridge Haskins & Davey (now known as the GHD Group). He was based in Melbourne.

== Early life ==
Gordon Gutteridge was born in Launceston, Tasmania. He was the son of a medical doctor, and one of five children. His brother Hal was an engineer and later became mayor of the City of Westminster in London. Gordon attended Melbourne Grammar School and later studied engineering at Melbourne University.

== War service ==
Gutteridge was on holiday in the US at the declaration of World War I. He immediately went to Calgary, Alberta, Canada, and enlisted in the Canadian army the day after war was declared. During World War 1, Gutteridge served at the battles of Ypres and the Somme. He was seriously wounded and taken prisoner. He made two unsuccessful escape attempts from the Altdamm prisoner-of-war camp.

== Career ==
At the end of the war he returned to Canada for demobilisation, then back to Melbourne to finish his engineering studies. He won a Rockefeller scholarship and completed his master's degree at Harvard University.

Gutteridge was later appointed director of the Commonwealth Division of Public Health Engineering. In 1928 he resigned from that position and commenced private practice in Melbourne. He specialised in water and sewerage schemes, especially in rural Victoria and Tasmania, but also designed other facilities such as abattoirs and saleyards.

In 1929, Gordon Gutteridge was elected a member of the Kew City Council, and was mayor of Kew in 1933–34.

The practice of Gordon Gutteridge merged with that of Gerald Haskins and Geoffrey Davey to form GHD in 1939.

After the outbreak of World War 2, Gutteridge and his firm became involved in the design and construction of military camps and training schools. He travelled widely to investigate the state of the art in these facilities in the UK, the US and Canada.

Gutteridge had always suffered poor health and the effects of his World War 1 injuries never left him. He collapsed at his desk in February 1942 and did not recover.
