= Yates (company) =

- Company type: Subsidiary
- Founded: 1883
- Parent: Dulux Group
- Website: www.yates.co.nz/

Yates is a horticultural supply company primarily for the home gardening market in New Zealand and Australia.

== History ==
Yates was founded in Auckland, New Zealand by Arthur Yates in 1883. In 1887, he opened a branch in Sussex St, Sydney, and left his brother, Ernest, in charge of the New Zealand store. They came to an agreement to run the stores separately until the 1980s, when the two companies joined together again.

By 1893, Arthur started selling his seed packets for home gardeners. Yates began to sell other gardening items apart from seeds, and the range soon included fertiliser, sprays, pots, potting mix and tools. In 1895, the Yates Garden Guide was published, a basic gardening guide. The guide is still published today, after 110 years.

Yates is now a subsidiary of Dulux Group, an Australian listed company on the S&P/ASX 200.

== See also ==
- Gardening in Australia
