= Arthur Yates =

Australian horticulturist and seedsman

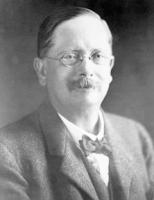
- Born: 10 May 1861; Stretford, Lancashire, England
- Died: 30 July 1926 (aged 65); Burwood, Sydney, Australia
- Occupation: Horticulturist
- Organization: Yates

Arthur Yates (10 May 1861 – 30 July 1926) was an Australian horticulturist and seedsman who founded the horticultural supply company Yates.

== Early life ==
Yates was born on 10 May 1861 in Stretford, Lancashire, England, one of the six sons of seedsman Samuel Yates and his wife Mary (née McMullen). Yates' father operated a seed shop that was handed over to him by his father when he was aged 15, and in 1888, Samuel Yates took over his father's entire seed empire. Diagnosed with asthma, Arthur Yates moved to New Zealand in December 1879 and worked as a farmhand near Otago for some two years.

== Career and death ==
In 1883, Yates set up a modest seed shop in Auckland, travelling on horseback to sell seeds to farmers. In 1886, Yates returned to Australia and settled down in Sydney a year later, letting his younger brother Ernest be in charge of his New Zealand seed business. On 13 November 1888, Yates married Caroline Mary Davies in Wellington, Shropshire, England. They spent their honeymoon in Italy before returning to Australia. In 1895, Yates began writing a gardening book titled Yates' Gardening Guide for Australia and New Zealand which was primarily targeted at amateur gardeners. The book was a commercial success and became a yearly production. Meanwhile, Yates' main business became unrivalled in size and he established an office and warehouse in Sussex Street in 1896. In order to procure the best seeds, Yates frequently travelled to Europe and also set up seed farms in other parts of Australia. In around 1907, Arthur Yates formally divested his interests from his brother's, although both operations shared the name Arthur Yates & Co. and they remained in close contact with their father's Manchester headquarters. Caroline Davies died in 1916. Arthur Yates employed all of his sons, Harold, Arthur, Guy, and Philip, but excluded his daughters Vera and Maud. Yates was a staunch supporter of the Farm Home in Windsor and the Boys; Home in Milleewa, Ashfield. He died on 30 July 1926 in his residence in Burwood, Sydney, aged 65. The cause of death was cancer. He was buried in Enfield Cemetery and his company remained in operation, first as a family business headed by his eldest son Harold, and later as Yates Seeds Limited. It merged with Hortico to become Arthur Yates & Co. (later Yates), which was purchased for $45 million by Orica in 2003.
