= New Berrima, New South Wales =

New Berrima
- Town
- Coordinates: 34°30′S 150°20′E
- Country: Australia
- State: New South Wales
- Region: Southern Highlands
- LGA: Wingecarribee Shire
- Location: 130 km (81 mi) from Sydney; 13 km (8.1 mi) from Bowral; 71 km (44 mi) from Goulburn

Government
  - State electorate: Goulburn
  - Federal division: Whitlam
- Elevation: 691 m (2,267 ft)

Population
  - Total: 598 (SAL 2021)
- Postcode: 2577
- County: Camden
- Parish: Bong Bong
Localities around New Berrima
| | Berrima |
| Berrima | New Berrima | Moss Vale |
| | Sutton Forest |

New Berrima is a village in the Southern Highlands of New South Wales, Australia, in Wingecarribee Shire.

According to the 2016 census, New Berrima had a population of 584. At the 2021 census, there were 598 residents.

A cement factory was established in new Berrima, New South Wales in the late 1920s. New Berrima was built for its workers about 3 km south-east of Berrima during this time.

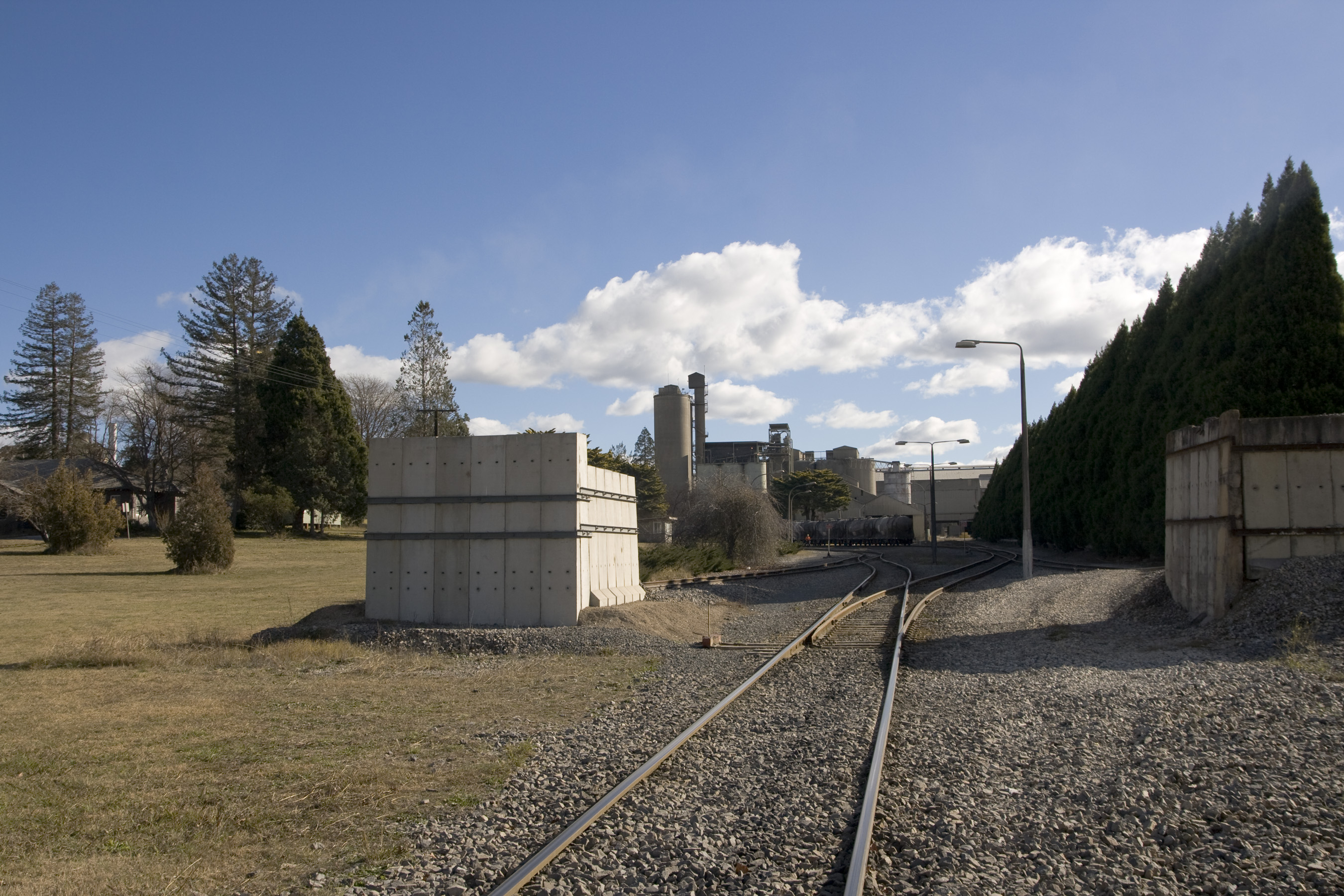
View of the cement works from the Berrima Road/Berrima railway line level crossing.
