= NSW Wallaby =

Wallaby
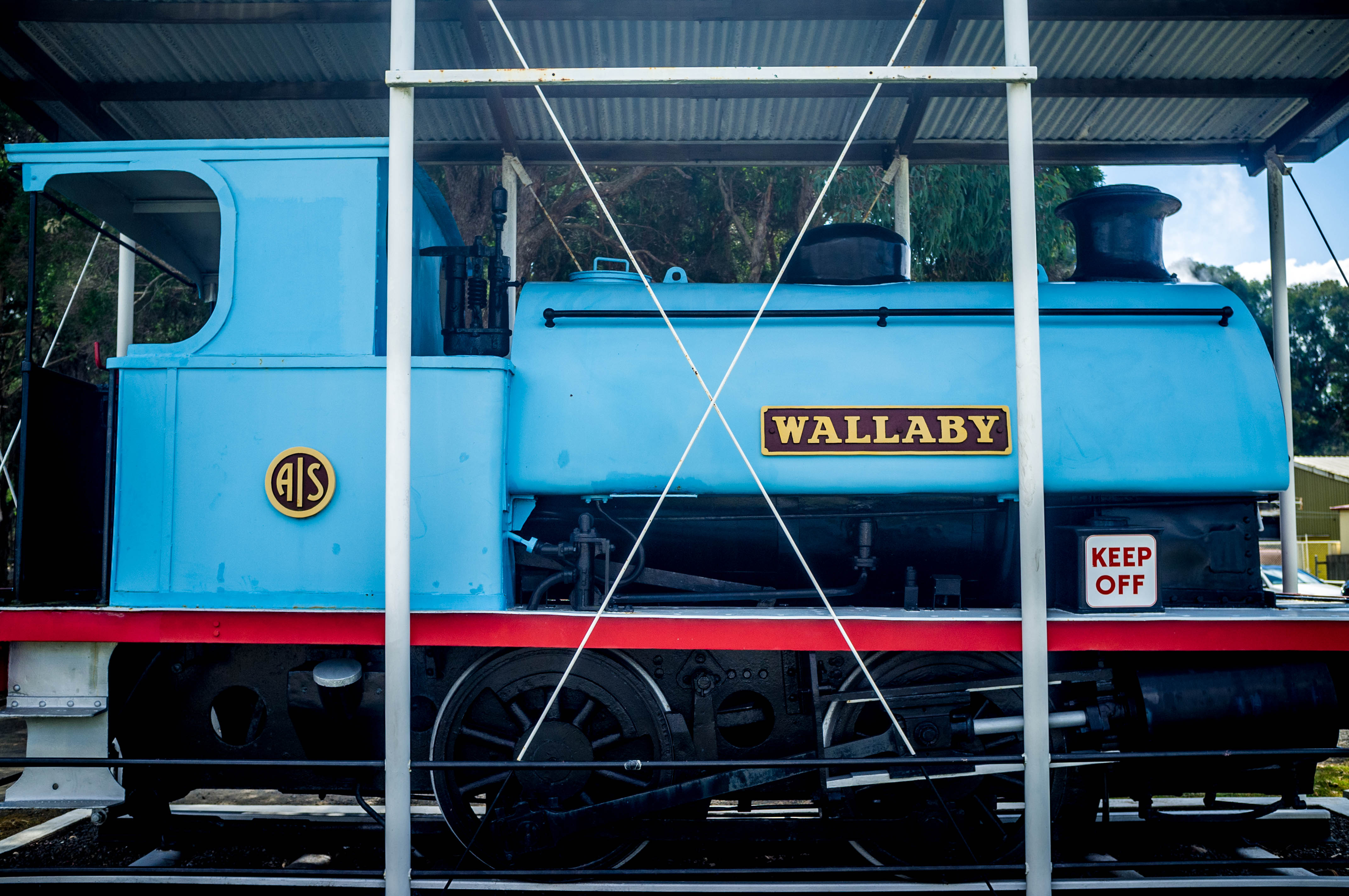
- Wallaby 0-4-0ST Locomotive
Type and origin
- Power type: Steam
- Builder: Hawthorn Leslie and Company; Newcastle-on-Tyne
- Serial number: 2988
- Build date: 1913
- Total produced: 1
Specifications
- Configuration
  - Whyte: 0-4-0ST
- Gauge: 4 ft 8 1/2 in (1,435 mm) standard gauge
- Driver dia.: 3 ft 0 in (914 mm)
- Loco weight: 16.75 long tons (17.0 tonnes; 18.8 short tons)
- Boiler pressure: 120 lbf/in^{2} (0.83 MPa)
Career
- Operators: Hoskins Lithgow Steel Works
- Withdrawn: 19 November 1962
- Disposition: Static display

NSW Wallaby was a steam locomotive seeing service in New South Wales.

== History ==
Wallaby was built for the Hoskin Lithgow Steel Works to serve the No. 2 blast furnace plant in 1913. The locomotive was transferred to Port Kembla by Australian Iron and Steel Ltd. (AIS) in 1932.

In 1933 Wallaby spent a period at South Kembla Colliery before returning to AIS.

== Demise and Preservation ==
Withdrawn from service at Port Kembla on 19 November 1962 "Wallaby" was placed on static display 5 June 1963. The locomotive was donated to the Illawarra Light Railway Museum in December 1979.
