= Geoffrey Davey =

Geoffrey Innes Davey, KCGS, CBE (27 November 1906 – 12 February 1975) was an Australian civil engineer and priest.

Davey was born at Double Bay, Sydney to English-born law clerk Joseph Innes Davey and his wife, Caroline (née Hurley). He attended Marist Brothers' High School in Darlinghurst and then the University of Sydney, receiving a Bachelor of Engineering in 1929. After graduating, he became an assistant construction engineer, working on the Woronora Dam for the Metropolitan Water, Sewerage and Drainage Board; he later began his own Queensland business manufacturing roofing tiles. In 1933 he was in charge of mill installation at Port Kembla for Australian Iron and Steel Ltd and then worked in Papua and Tasmania. He married architect Elsa Annette Isabel Hazelton at St Mary's Cathedral, Sydney on 6 February 1935.

Davey and his partner Gerald Haskins formed GHD Group and worked on the Morning Star dam in Tasmania and in New South Wales before amalgamating with Gordon Gutteridge in 1939 and receiving Commonwealth contracts during World War II. In 1946 he contested the Australian House of Representatives, running unsuccessfully for the Liberal Party in Hume. One of the founders of the Association of Consulting Engineers, he was its president from 1956 to 1957 and a councillor of the Institution of Engineers in 1962 and 1964–65. In 1966 he was appointed CBE.

Davey had been appointed a Knight Commander of the Order of St Gregory the Great in 1960, and worked as an advisor to the Sydney Catholic schools system and a director of St Vincent's Hospital, as well as the Mater Misericordiae Hospital and the Catholic Weekly. He retired from his firm in 1964, becoming executive director of the Sydney Catholic Schools Building and Finance Commission. In 1967, a widower, he began studying theology at the Pontifical Beda College in Rome, and was ordained a priest by Cardinal Sir Norman Gilroy at Wahroonga on 10 July 1971 in a church designed by his late wife. He was sent to Strathfield as a curate.

Davey died at the presbytery there in 1975, aged 68, of a coronary occlusion and was interred at Mona Vale beside his wife.
