= GHD Group =

International professional services company based in Australia

GHD
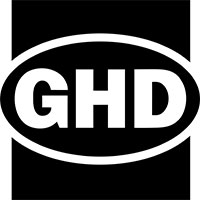
- Formerly: Gutteridge Haskins & Davey
- Type: Private
- Industry: Professional services
- Founded: 24 September 1928
- Founder: Gordon Gutteridge; Gerald Haskins; Geoffrey Davey
- Headquarters: Australia
- Number of locations: 200+ offices in 14 countries
- Area served: Worldwide
- Key people: Rob Knott (Chairman); Jim Giannopoulos (CEO)
- Products: Engineering, management, design, environmental science, architecture
- Services: Consulting
- Revenue: $ 3.0 billion (2025)
- Number of employees: 12,000 (2025)
- Website: www.ghd.com

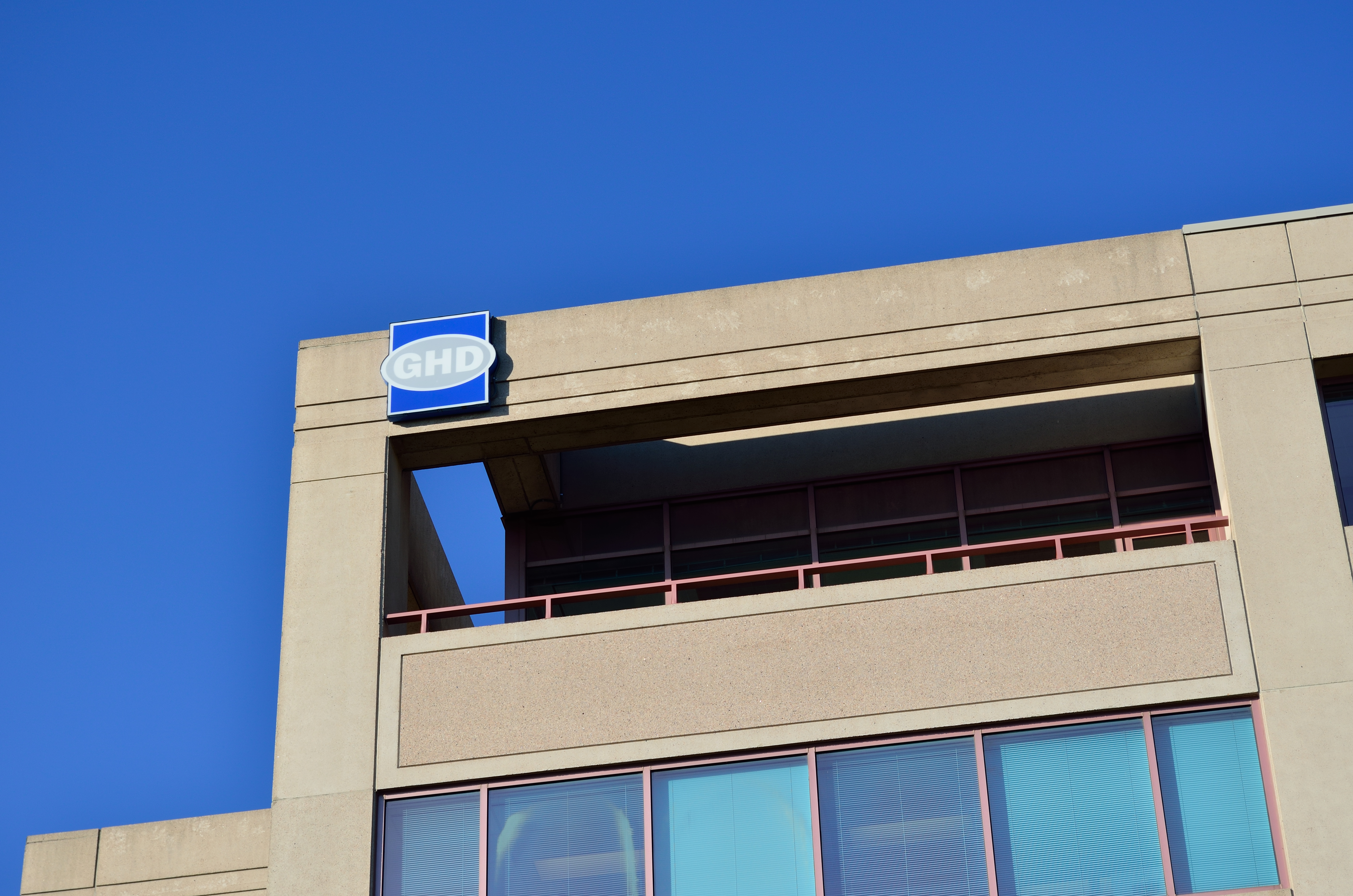
GHD office in North America

GHD Group Pty Ltd, formerly Gutteridge Haskins & Davey, is a global employee-owned multinational technical professional services firm providing advisory, architecture and design, buildings, digital, energy and resources, environmental, geosciences, project management, transportation and water services.

GHD employs more than 12,000 people—engineers, architects, planners, scientists, project managers and economists— operating in over 160 offices across five continents serving clients in water, energy and resources, environment, property and buildings, and transportation markets. GHD has delivered projects in over 135 countries.

== History ==
GHD was founded as a private practice in Melbourne, Australia in 1928 by Gordon Gutteridge who operated as a consulting engineer with focuses on water and sewerage. The partnership of Gerald Haskins and Geoffrey Davey joined with Gutteridge's practice in 1939, establishing the formal partnership of Gutteridge Haskins & Davey. During the 1950s and 60s GHD grew to more than 400 employees while expanding into transportation, manufacturing plants, building and civil works, energy, mining and dams.

A notable project of the 1960s was the extension of potable water and sewage infrastructure across Tasmania. GHD expanded globally in the 1970s with a joint venture in Malaysia. In 1981 Planner West was purchased adding 740 staff.

During the 1990s GHD expanded its services into architecture, environmental and business consulting while expanding its presence in Southeast Asia. During the 2000s GHD continued to grow through a series of mergers and acquisitions in the US, Canada, Europe, Australia, New Zealand, the Middle East, China, Chile and Malaysia. By 2013 GHD had grown to more than 1,000 employees in North America.

In 2014, GHD merged with Canadian firm Conestoga-Rovers & Associates in one of the largest private stock transactions in the engineering and environmental consulting industry, creating a combined company of 8,500 employees. At the time of the merger Conestoga-Rovers had about 3,000 employees mostly in North America and the United Kingdom, while GHD had 5,500 employees across five continents. The combined company became the sixth-largest employee-owned engineering consultancy in the world, with $1.5 billion in combined revenue. Also in 2014, GHD acquired the brand and business of Australian architecture firm Woodhead, later renamed GHD Woodhead.

In 2018 GHD opened a new North American headquarters facility in Waterloo, Ontario. At that time, the company said that the North American region accounted for over half of GHD's US$1.7 billion global revenue.

== Market sectors ==
In FY2024 30% of revenues were in the Environment sector, 21% in transportation, 19% in water, 18% in property and buildings, and 12% in Energy and resources. GHD saw 8% organic growth over FY2023 with revenues of 2.888 Billion AUD (1.822 Billion USD).

- Water – In 2024, nineteen percent of GHD’s revenues were derived from water-related design services. Past projects include desalination projects for the City of Carlsbad, Camp Pendleton, City of Huntington Beach and South Orange County in the US, the Brisbane and Christchurch rebuilding efforts, Manila Sewerage implementation, Codelco Colon Processing Plant in Chile and the Oakura Sewerage scheme in New Zealand. GHD designed and administered the contract to upgrade the Hespeler trunk sanitary sewer line for the city of Cambridge, Ontario without digging a 2 km trench through an environmentally sensitive area. It also designed a tunnel aqueduct for Manila Water to provide water to approximately 7 million people. It designed and constructed two ultraviolet disinfection surface water treatment facilities for Westchester County, New York. It constructed a water treatment system using membrane bioreactor technology to provide 100,000 gallons of reclaimed water per day for Wickenburg, Arizona.
- Energy & Resources – In 2024, twelve percent of GHD’s revenues were derived from energy and resources. Past projects of note include the Hawsons Magnetite Iron Ore Mine and the QCLNG Export Pipeline in Australia, and the Taysan Copper Mine in the Philippines.
- Environment – In 2024, thirty percent of GHD’s revenues were generated from environmental services. Past projects of note include the HydroAysen Transmission System in Chile, Minimbah Bank Third Track Biodiversity project, and the Townsville Marine Precinct, both in Australia. Recent projects include the installation of an articulated concrete block mat and sand-water slurry to remediate industrial contamination of Bayou d'Inde in Louisiana and conversion of a landfill in the Mariana Islands to a park, including the installation of drainage and liner systems reducing the amount of contaminated water and protection from erosion in adherence to EPA regulations.
- Property & Buildings – As of 2024, eighteen percent of GHD’s revenues were generated from property and buildings. Past projects of note include the Al Walkra Hospital in Qatar, the Kerikeri Police Station in New Zealand and Richlands Rail Station in Australia.
- Transportation – As of 2024, twenty-one percent of GHD’s revenues were generated from transportation. Past projects of note in include the Ahuriri to Napier Transportation Link in New Zealand, the San Antonio Port Expansion in Chile and South Road Superway in South Australia. Recent projects include the implementation of a multi-lane roundabout on Highway 68 in Monterey, California, including the project management, traffic analysis, and specialty engineering design; business case development and economic assessment, including highway and bridge concept designs, for New Zealand State Highway 3 connecting the Manawatū-Whanganui and Hawke’s Bay regions; and the design and construction of 1 km of acoustic barriers along New Zealand State Highway 1 to mitigate noise and air pollution.
- Digital – GHD employs over 500 technology professionals who provide data analytics, location intelligence, cyber security, and virtual and augmented reality technology services. Recent projects include the creation of a connected site for the Level Crossing Removal Authority to facilitate data handling and sharing across a complex rail infrastructure upgrade; and preparation of a smart city framework, roadmap and governance process for Glenelg Shire, Victoria.

== Achievements ==
The International Water Association awarded GHD's Birmingham Resilience Project the bronze medal for Exceptional Project Execution and Delivery at its 2018 Innovation Awards. The American Council of Engineering Companies of California honored GHD for Comprehensive Large-Scale Habitat Restoration for the wetland mitigation work the firm did with for the Border Coast Regional Airport Authority. The Australian Institute of Project Management recognized GHD for the firm's Pesticide Container Management in the Pacific. GHD received an Award of Merit, Environmental from Engineering News-Record for the firm's involvement in the closure of a Puerto Rico Dump and the construction of Eloy S. Inos Peace Park. GHD Woodhead received the Harry Seidler Award for Commercial Architecture and a national award for sustainable architecture from the Australian Institute of Architects for the design of the Barwon Water HQ in Geelong, Australia.

In 2024, GHD was ranked #14 Environmental Analyst in the Top 100 Global Environmental & Sustainability Consultancy Firm Rankings.

In 2018, GHD was ranked 16th in the Australian Financial Review's annual top 500 private companies in Australia list.

In 2024, GHD was ranked 27th in Engineering News-Record's annual Top 500 Global Design Firms.
