= Bonnet Bay =

- Suburb
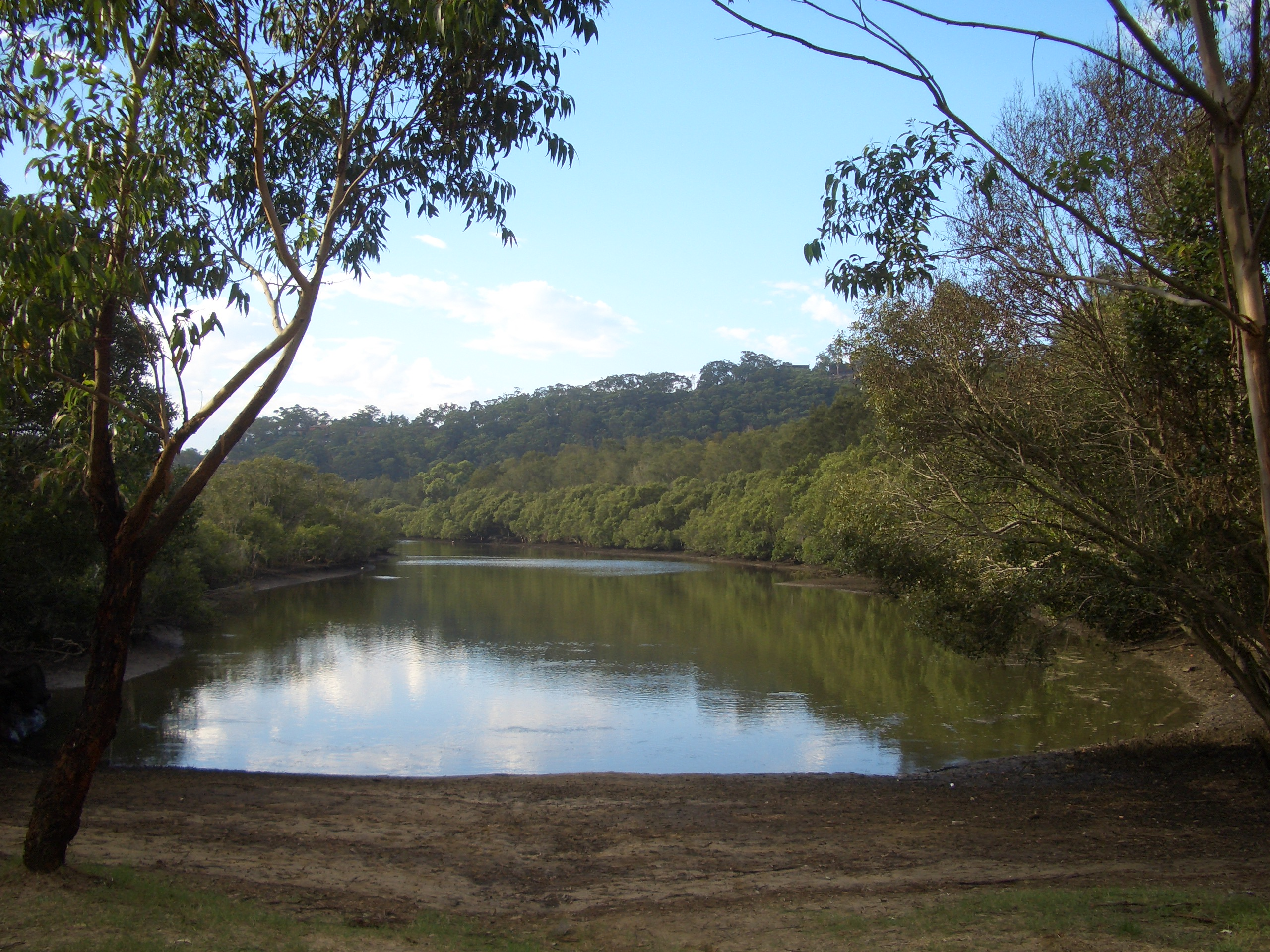
- Twilight Inlet, Bonnet Bay

- Interactive map of Bonnet Bay
- Country: Australia
- State: New South Wales
- City: Sydney
- LGA: Sutherland Shire
- Location: 29 km (18 mi) south of Sydney CBD
- Established: 1964

Government
  - State electorate: Miranda
  - Federal division: Hughes
- Elevation: 41 m (135 ft)

Population
  - Total: 2,238 (2021 census)
- Postcode: 2226
Suburbs around Bonnet Bay
Illawong	Illawong	Como
Bangor	Bonnet Bay	Jannali
Woronora	Sutherland	Jannali

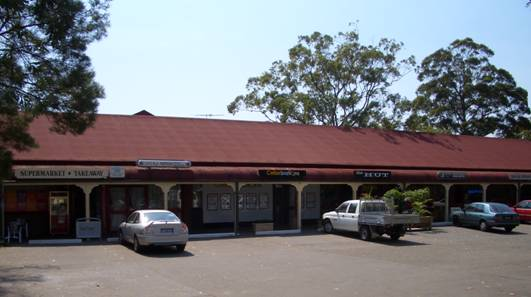
Bonnet Bay Shopping Village

Bonnet Bay is a suburb in southern Sydney, in the state of New South Wales, Australia that is located 29 kilometres (18 mi) south of the Sydney central business district in the local government area of the Sutherland Shire. Its postcode is 2226, which it shares with neighbouring Jannali and Como.

Bonnet Bay is located on the eastern bank of the Woronora River, which flows north into the Georges River. Bonnet Bay's boundaries are the Woronora River and Bindea Street in the north, Lincoln Crescent and Taft Place in the east, the suburb of Jannali in the south and the Woronora River in the west. The size of the suburb is approximately 1.5 square kilometres. It contains eight parks which cover almost 24.7% of its total area.

The suburb draws its name from the adjacent bay of the same name. Its terrain consists of Sydney sandstone with steep gullies, creeks, escarpments and one sandstone plateau.

In terms of crime rates, Bonnet Bay has been ranked to be among the top ten safest suburbs in Sydney.

== History ==
The original name proposed for the area was Kirkby. A rock formation making a cave in the area was known as 'The Bonnet' because it was shaped like an old-fashioned woman's poke bonnet and this was adopted for the name of the bay on the Woronora River which the formation overlooks. The Geographical Names Board decided to name the land area itself Bonnet Bay in 1969. Construction started in late 1969 at Fillmore Rd, with completion of all house plots in 1985.

== Demographics ==
According to the 2021 Census, there were 2,238 residents in Bonnet Bay, with a median age of 44. In Bonnet Bay, 77.5% of people were born in Australia. The other most common countries of birth were England 5.5%, New Zealand 1.5%, China (excludes SARs and Taiwan) 1.0%, Scotland 0.8% and South Africa 0.8%. 88.3% of people only spoke English at home. Other languages spoken at home included Mandarin 1.5%, Cantonese 1.0%, Greek 1.0%, Spanish 0.8% and Russian 0.7%. The most common responses for religion in Bonnet Bay were No religion, so described 34.7%, Catholic 28.8%, Anglican 16.7%, Eastern Orthodox 3.4% and Uniting Church 2.9%.

== Landmarks ==
Burnum Burnum Reserve lies between Bonnet Bay, Como, Jannali, Sutherland and Woronora, extending for about two kilometres. The reserve, contiguous with The Glen and Koolangarra reserves, effectively surrounds Bonnet Bay, with main roads cutting through it. Burnum Burnum Reserve hosts some plants that are almost extinct and are protected. However, it also represents a fire threat to Bonnet Bay, most notably manifesting in the 1994 Como bushfires. The reserve was originally known as "Jannali Reserve" but the name was changed in 2005 to commemorate Burnum Burnum, the prominent Aboriginal Sutherland Shire resident. A small plaque in the Reserve details his speech in England on the occasion of Australia's bicentenary in 1988, in which he symbolically claimed England on behalf of Aboriginal people.

A noteworthy feature of this suburb is that all of the streets except one are named after American Presidents. Washington Drive runs through the length of the suburb and is twice split into one-way 'Upper' and 'Lower' sections due to the steep hills it runs across. Nixon, who was the incumbent president when the suburb was established in 1969, is the last president a street is named after. The only street not named after an American president is Tudar Road, which originates in NW Sutherland and cuts through Burnum Burnum reserve to enter Bonnet Bay.

== Commercial area, school and transport ==
Bonnet Bay is mostly residential, with a small shopping centre located in Kennedy Crescent, known as the Bonnet Bay Shopping Village. Its shops include a supermarket, hairdresser, pizza restaurant/takeaway and café.

Bonnet Bay Public School is located on Tudar Road. It was officially opened in 1979 by Her Royal Highness Princess Anne, who, in her capacity as president of the Save the Children Fund, had asked to visit a "typical Australian school", with Bonnet Bay Public School being the example chosen. The school also offers before and after school childcare.

Though Bonnet Bay does not have its own train station, neighbouring suburbs Jannali and Como have stations on the Illawarra line of the Sydney Trains network. The Route 968 bus serves Bonnet Bay, connecting it to Jannali, Miranda and Kareela.

Bonnet Bay notably has only two roads for access in and out of the suburb.

== Recreation ==
Bonnet Bay has a boat ramp, a number of picnic and recreational areas, including a cricket oval, soccer oval, two netball courts, two tennis courts and two baseball fields. Its major recreational area, which is by the water, is Lakewood City Reserve.

== Events ==
Bonnet Bay was well known in southern Sydney for its extensive displays of Christmas decorations and lights during the festive season, though the tradition reached its peak in the mid-1980s and has since spread to other areas throughout the Sutherland Shire.

== Sport ==
Bonnet Bay has a single sporting club, Bonnet Bay FC, a football club which fields boys' and girls' junior teams, and men's and women's senior teams, playing at Lakewood City Reserve.

== Gallery ==
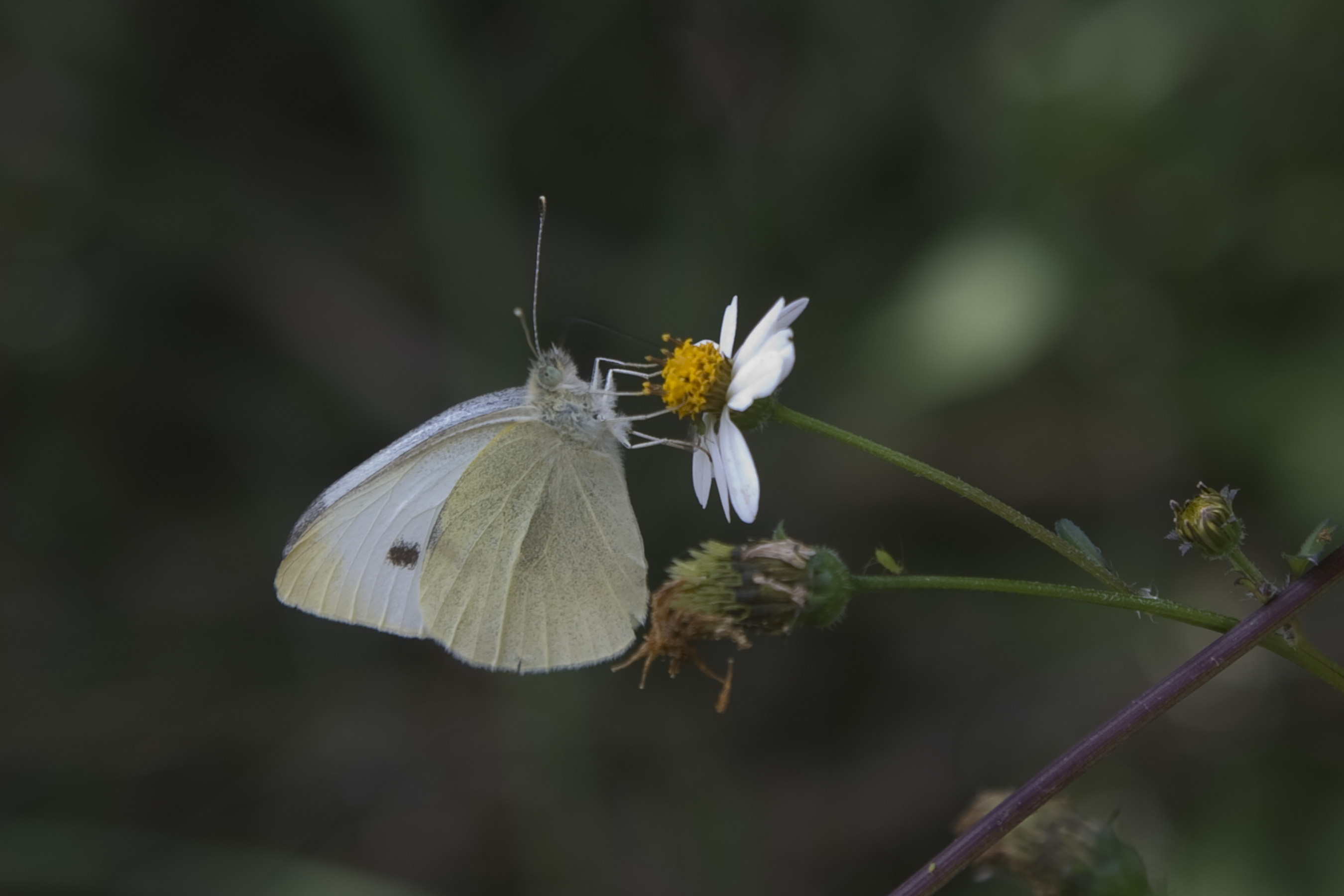
Bonnet Bay NSW 2226, Australia – Panorama #1

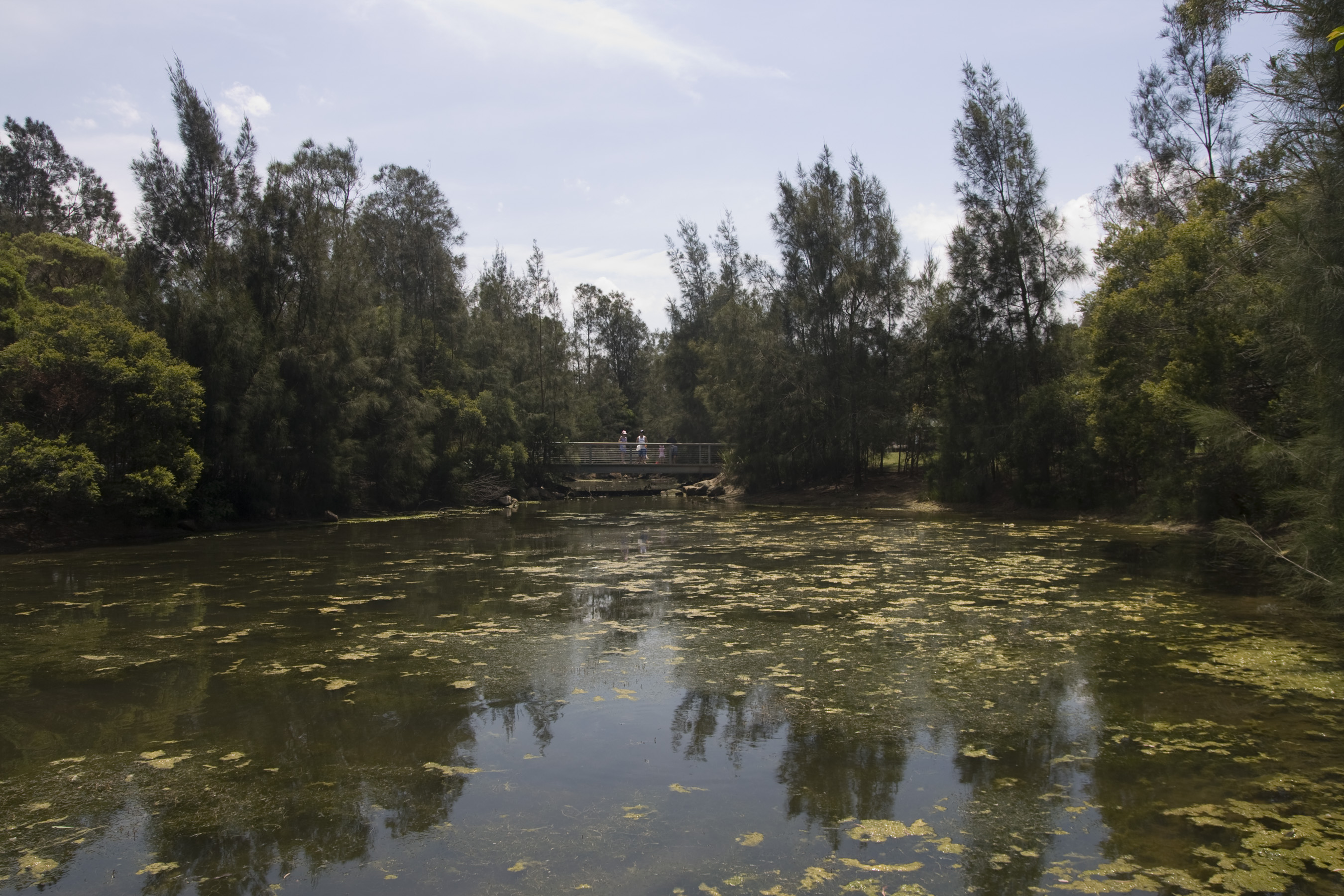
Bonnet Bay NSW 2226, Australia – Panorama #2

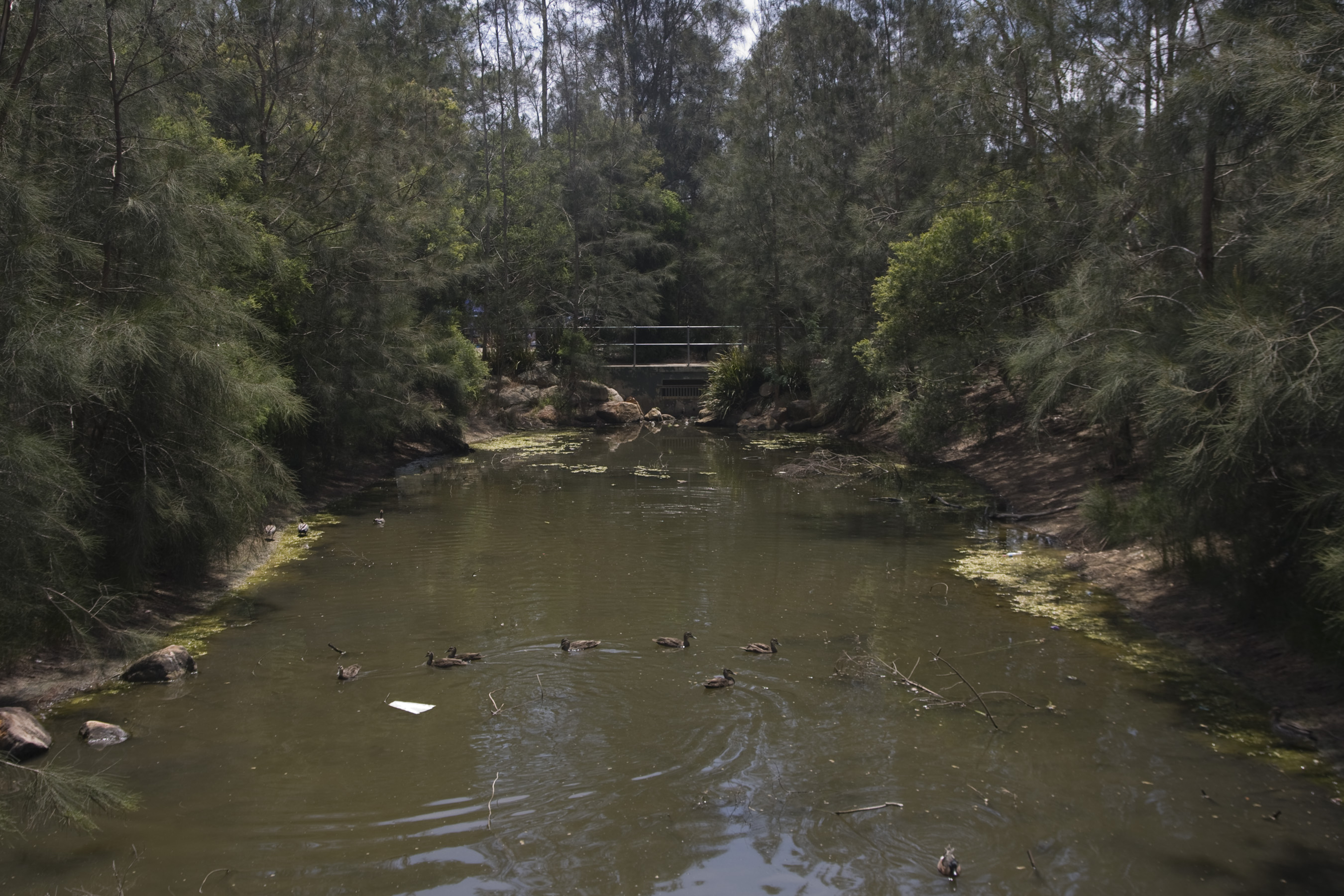
Bonnet Bay NSW 2226, Australia – Panorama #3

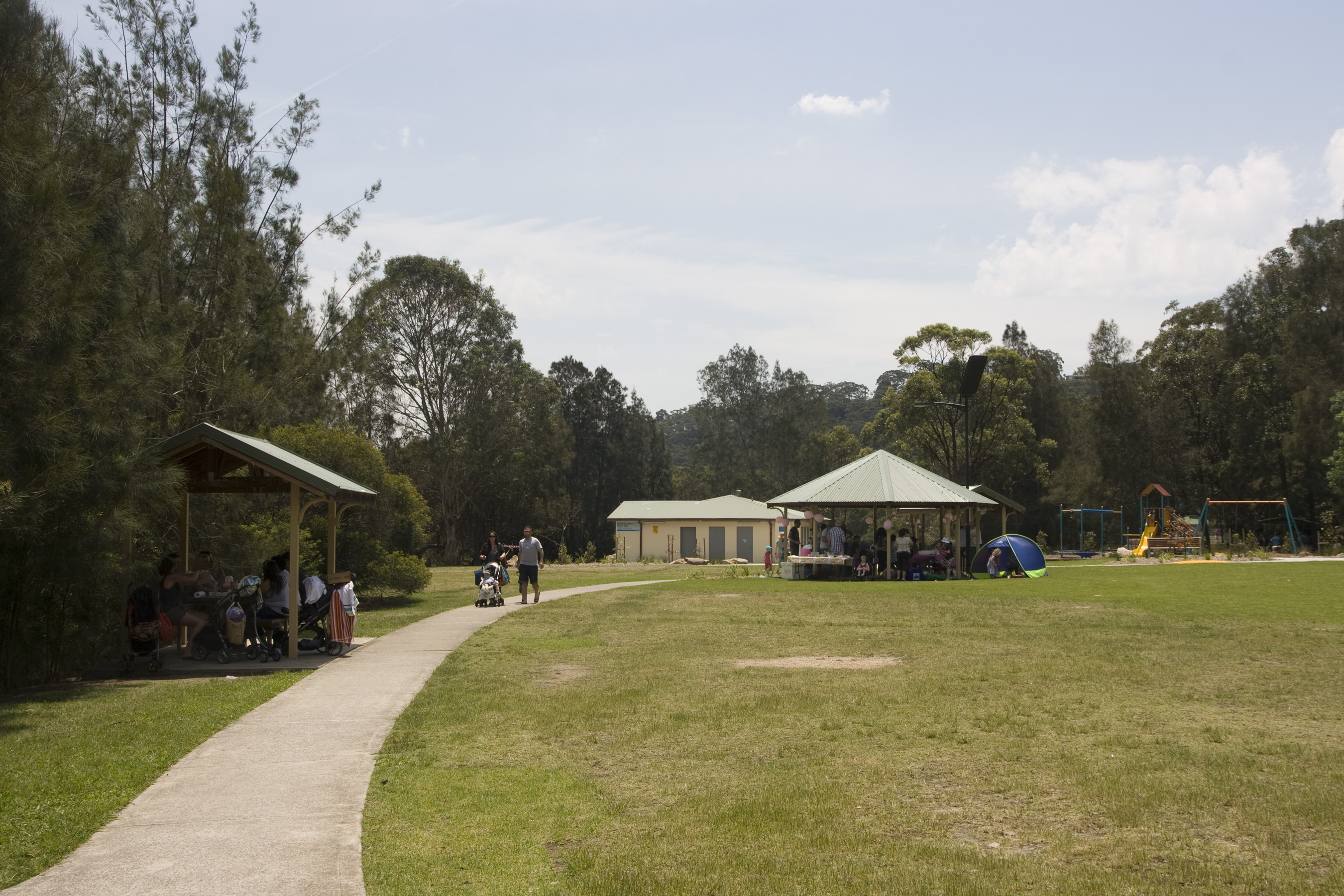
Bonnet Bay NSW 2226, Australia – Panorama #4

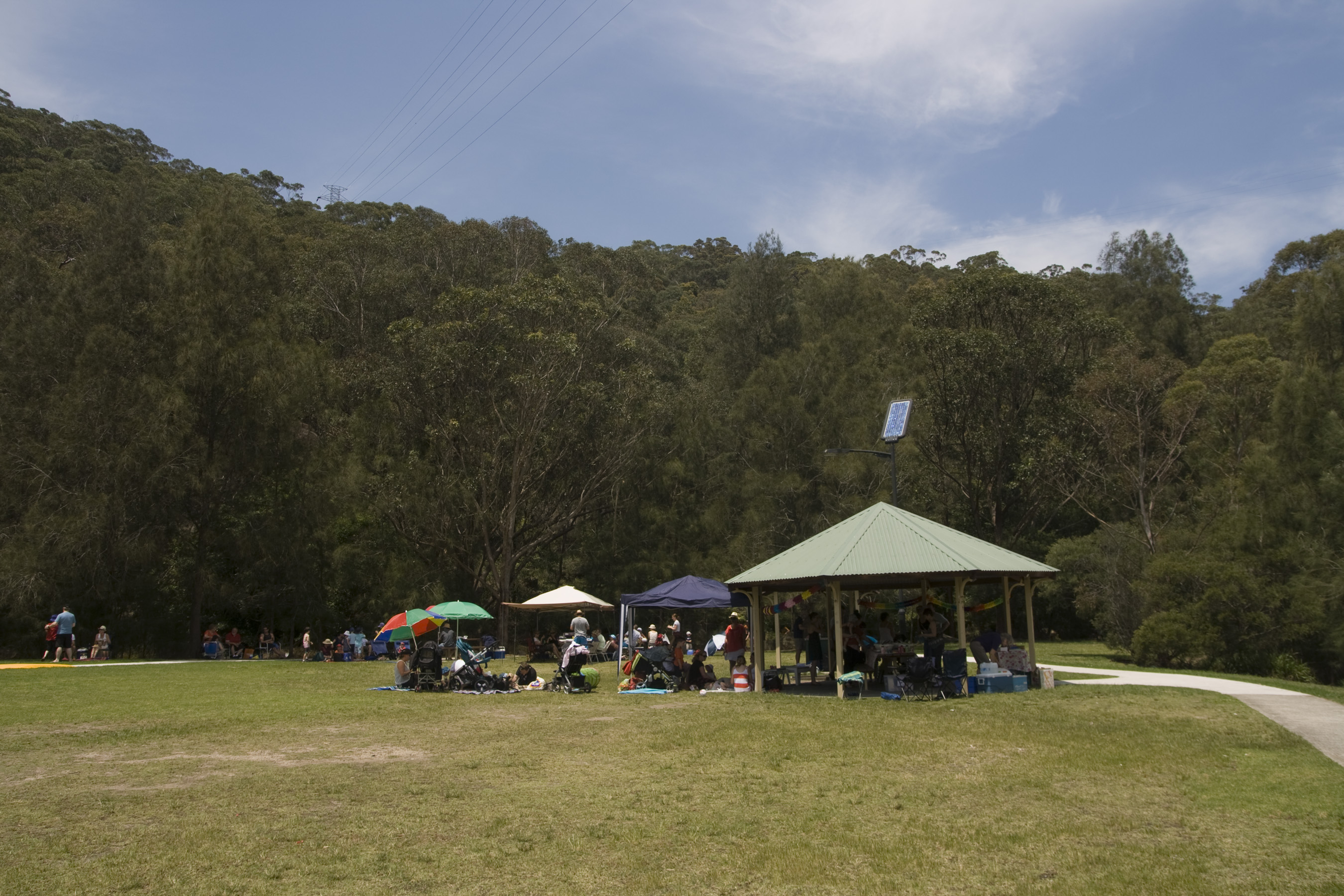
Bonnet Bay NSW 2226, Australia – Panorama #5

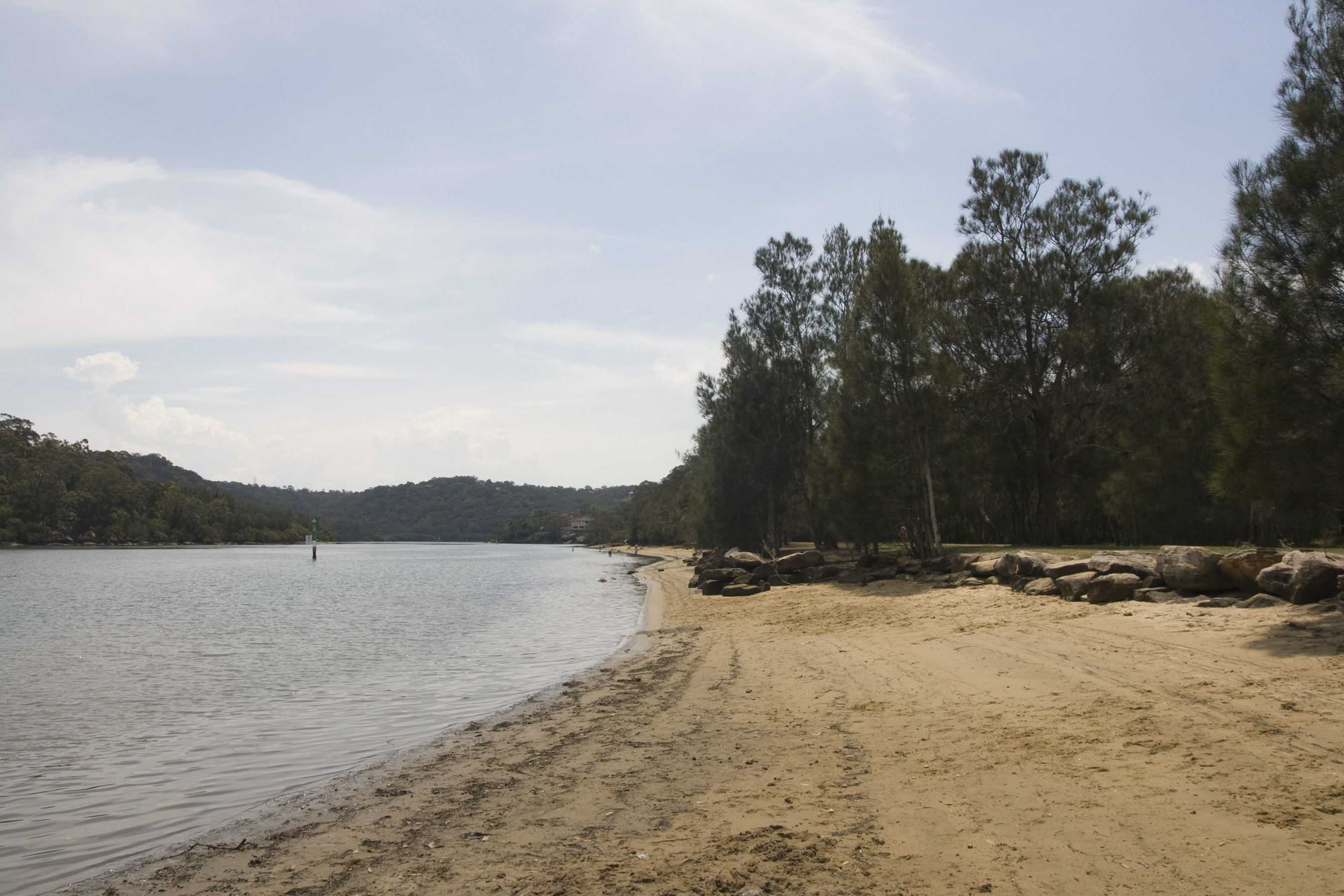
Bonnet Bay NSW 2226, Australia – Panorama #6

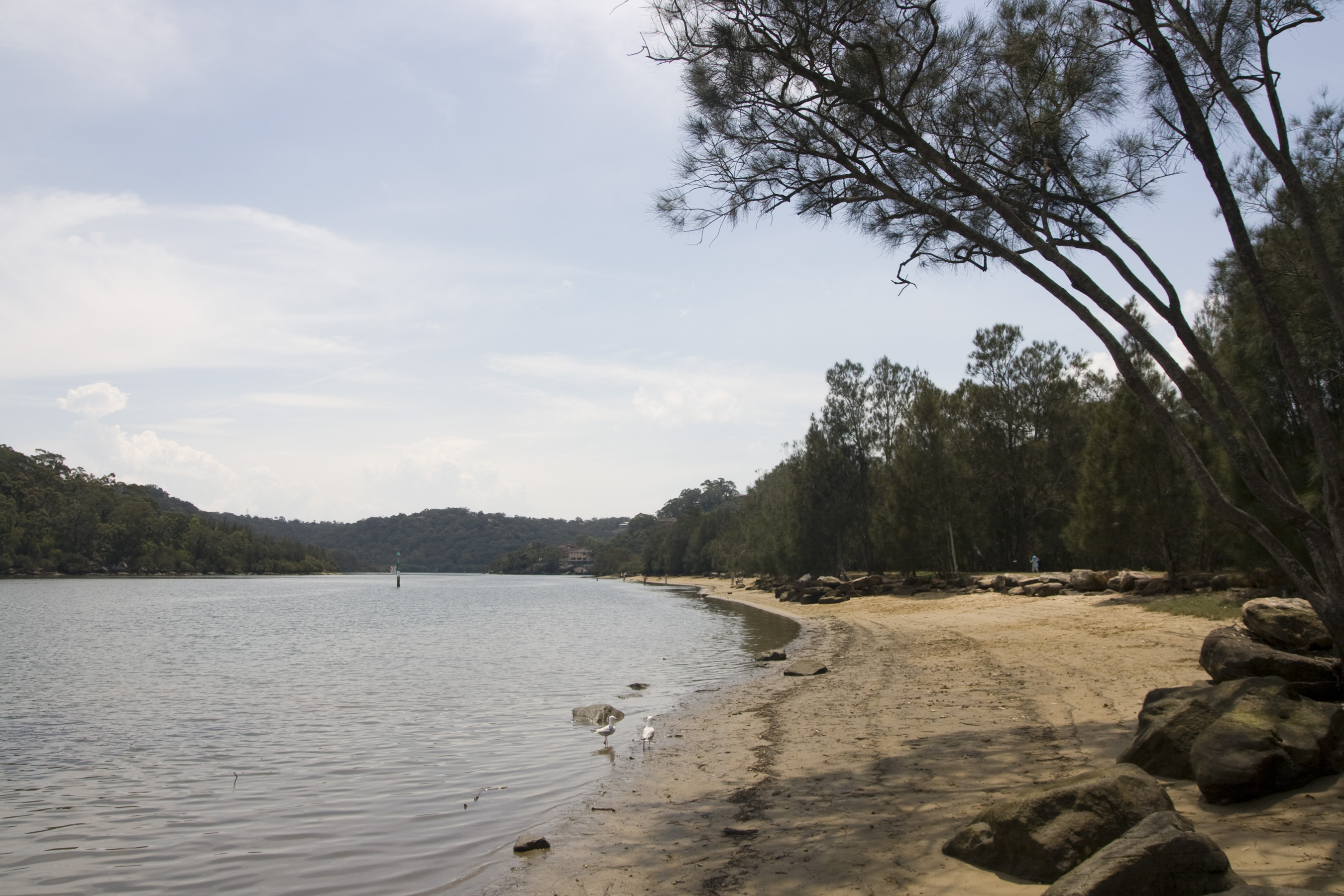
Bonnet Bay NSW 2226, Australia – Panorama #7

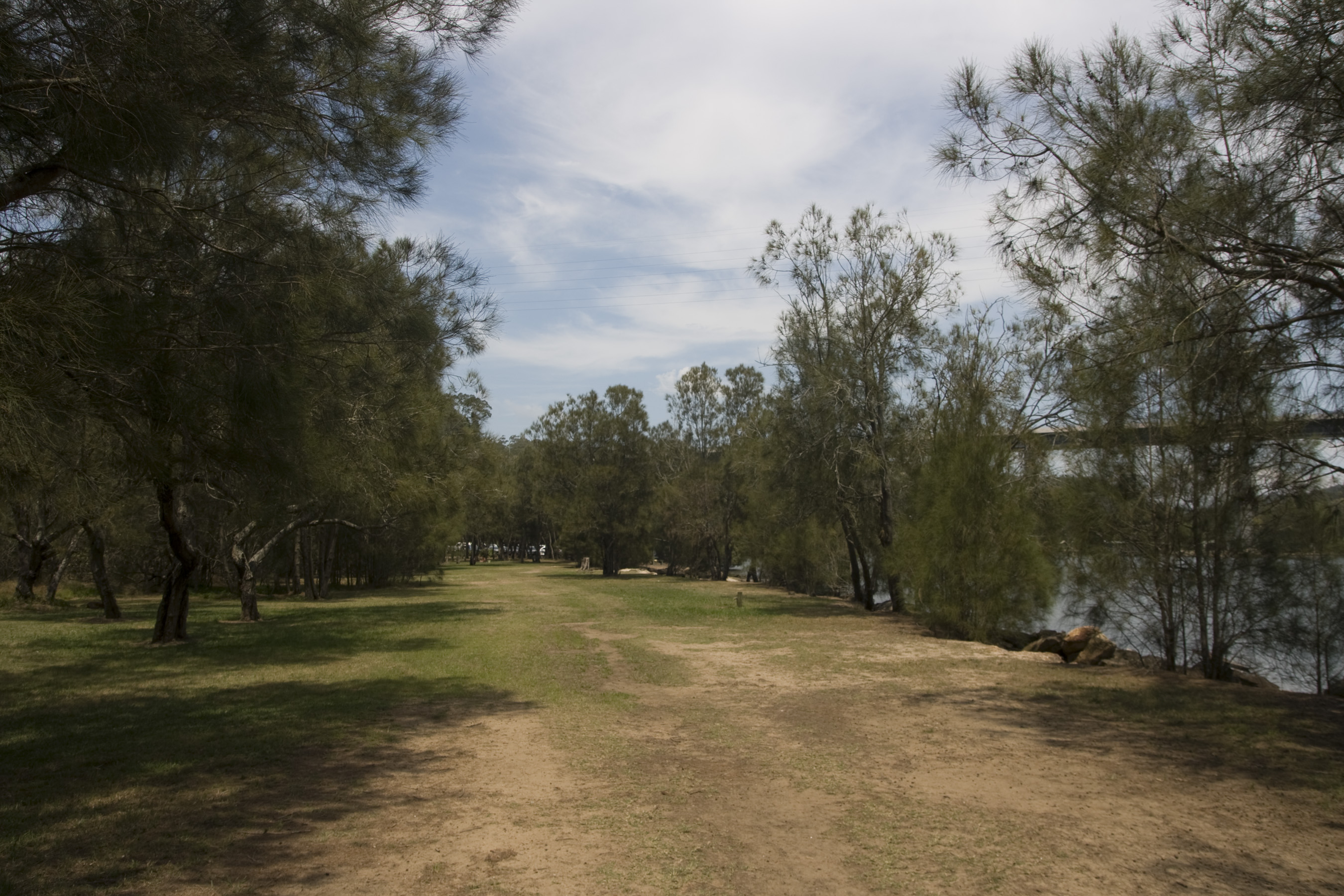
Bonnet Bay NSW 2226, Australia – Panorama #8

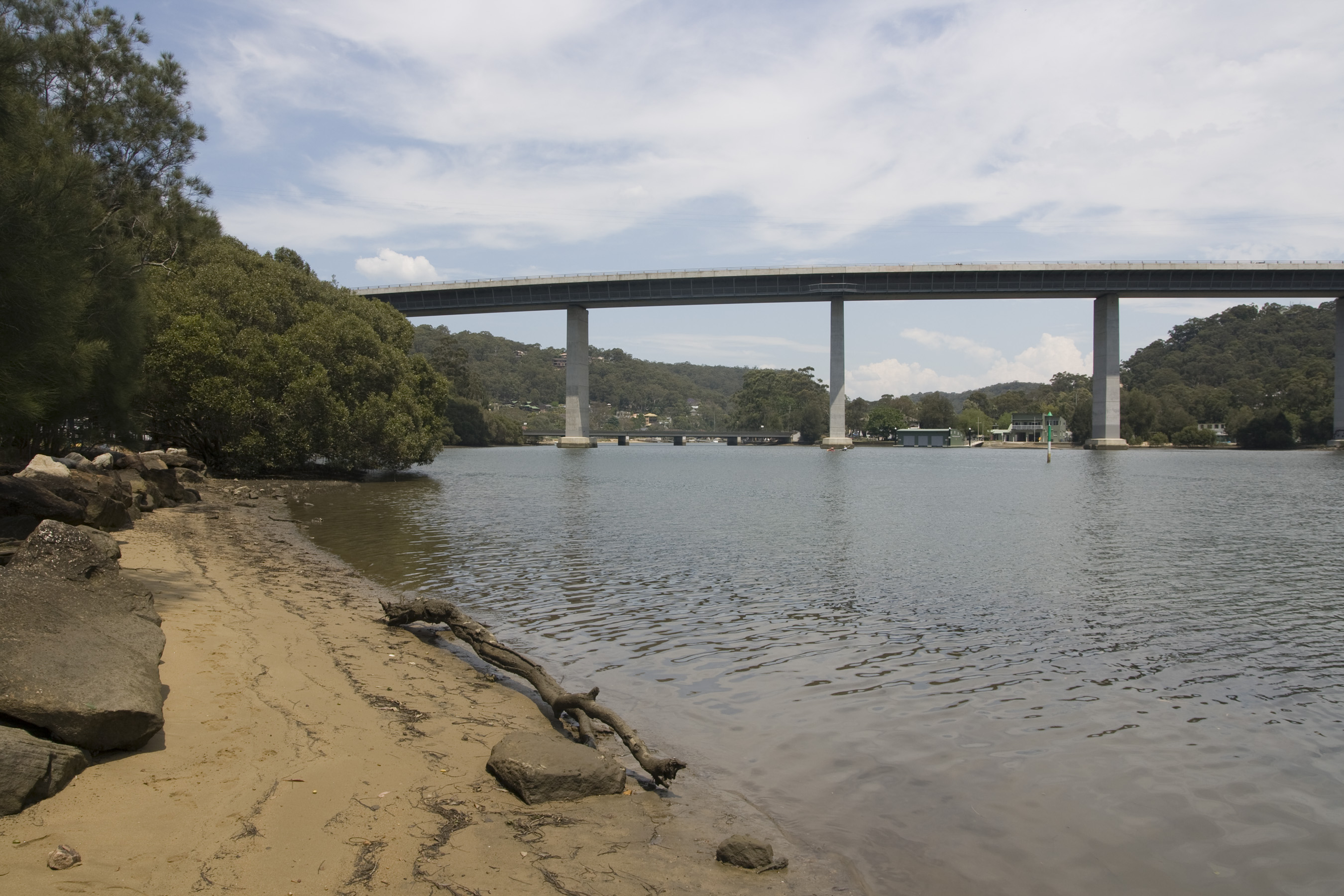
Bonnet Bay NSW 2226, Australia – Panorama #9

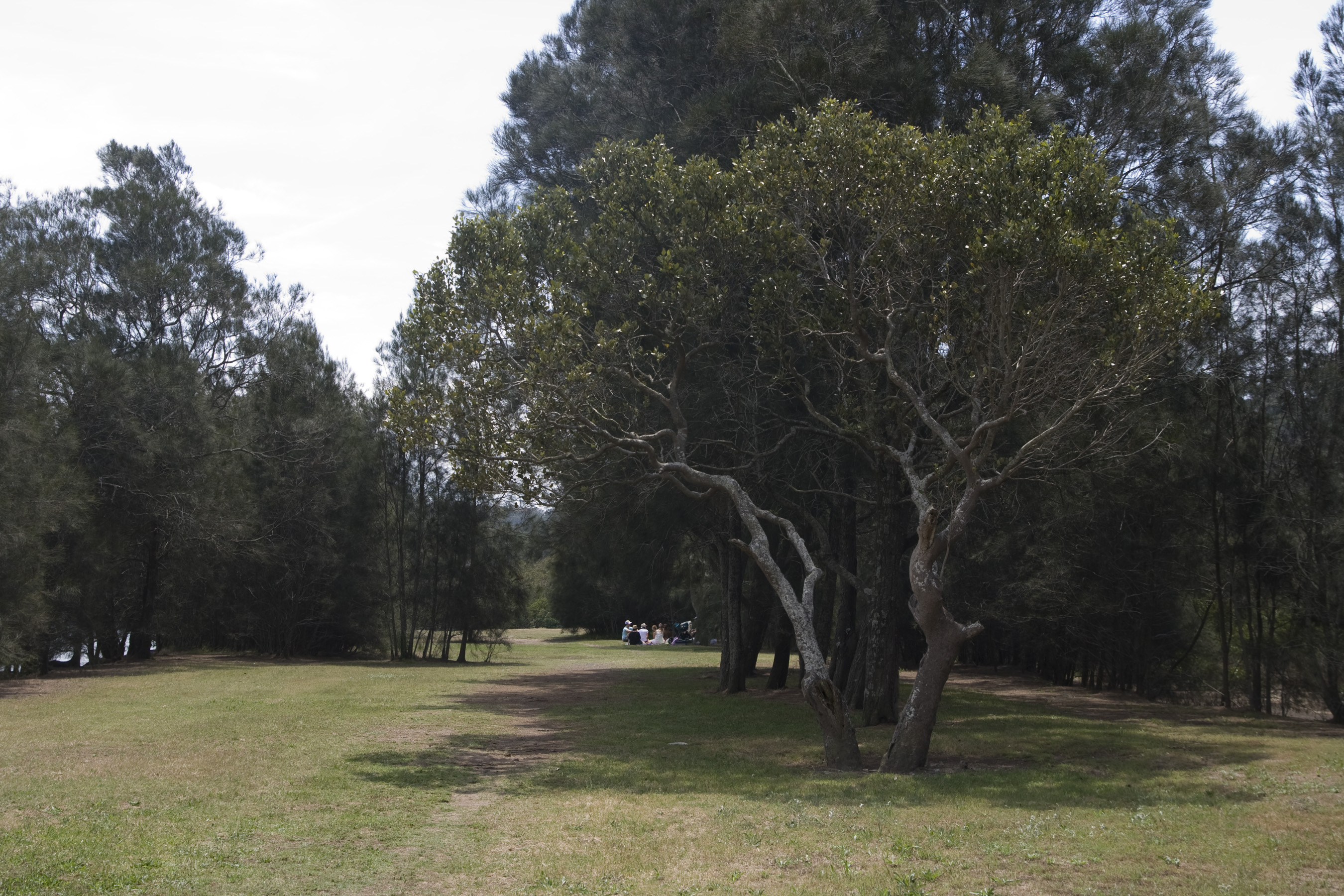
Bonnet Bay NSW 2226, Australia – Panorama #10

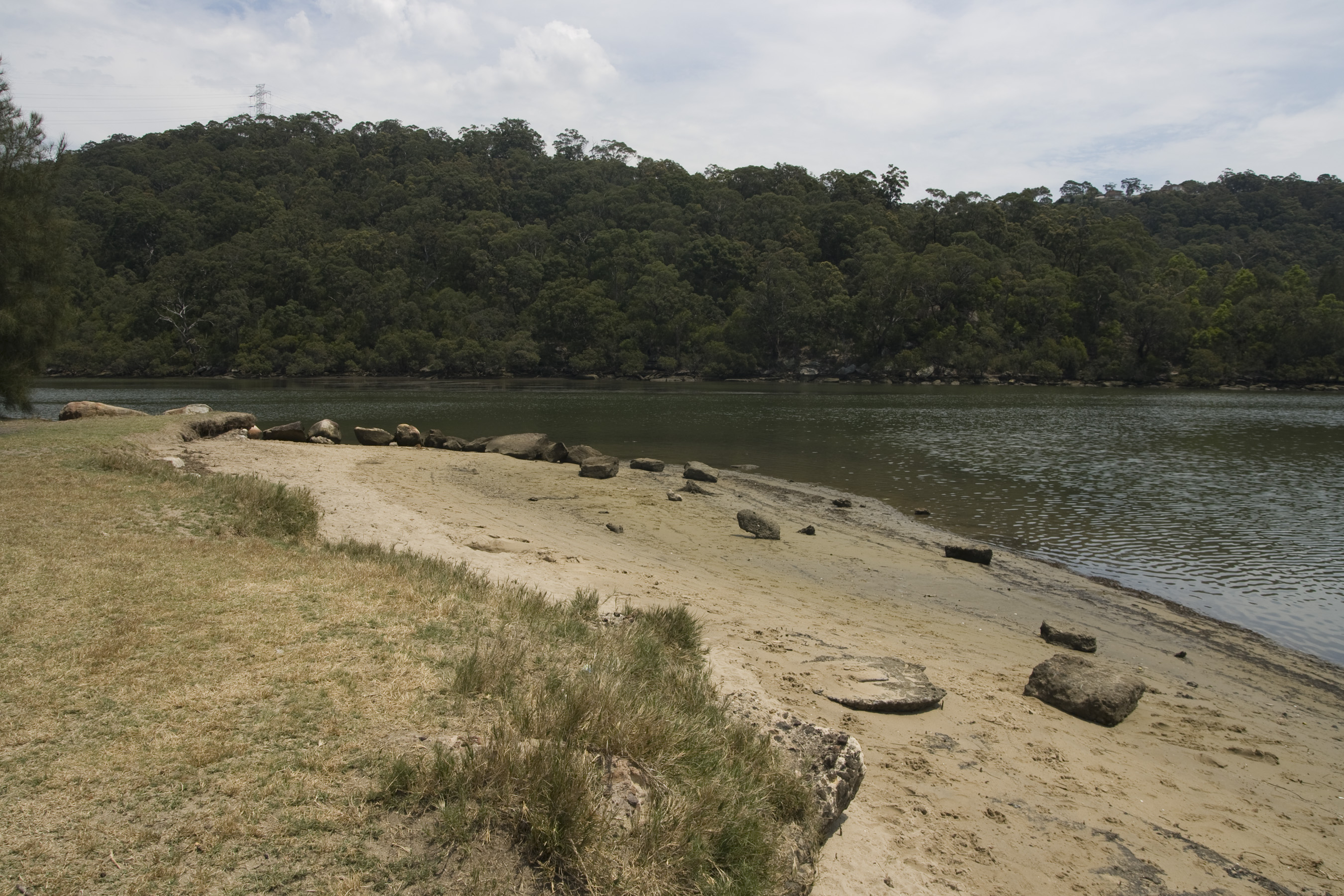
Bonnet Bay NSW 2226, Australia – Panorama #11

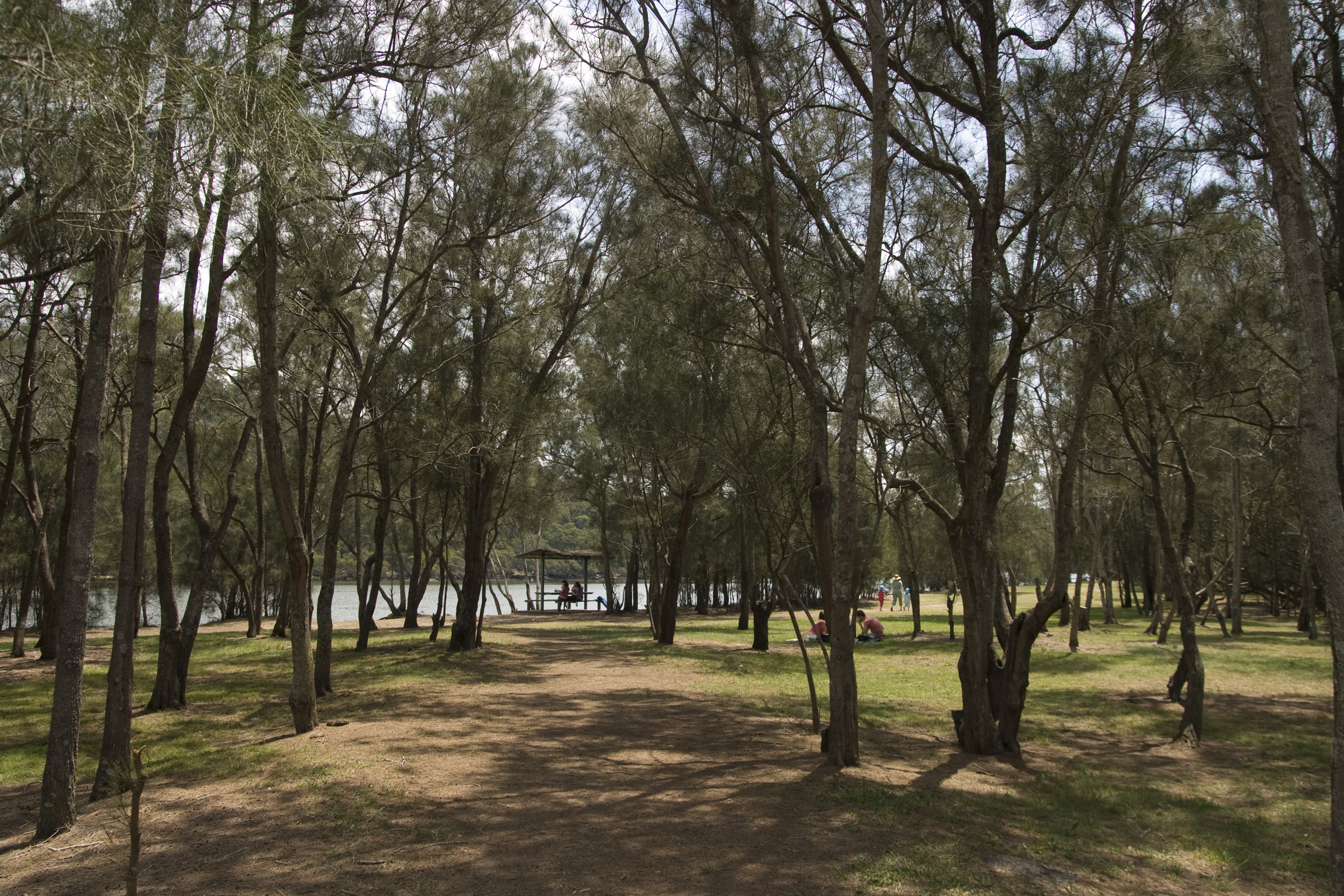
Bonnet Bay NSW 2226, Australia – Panorama #12

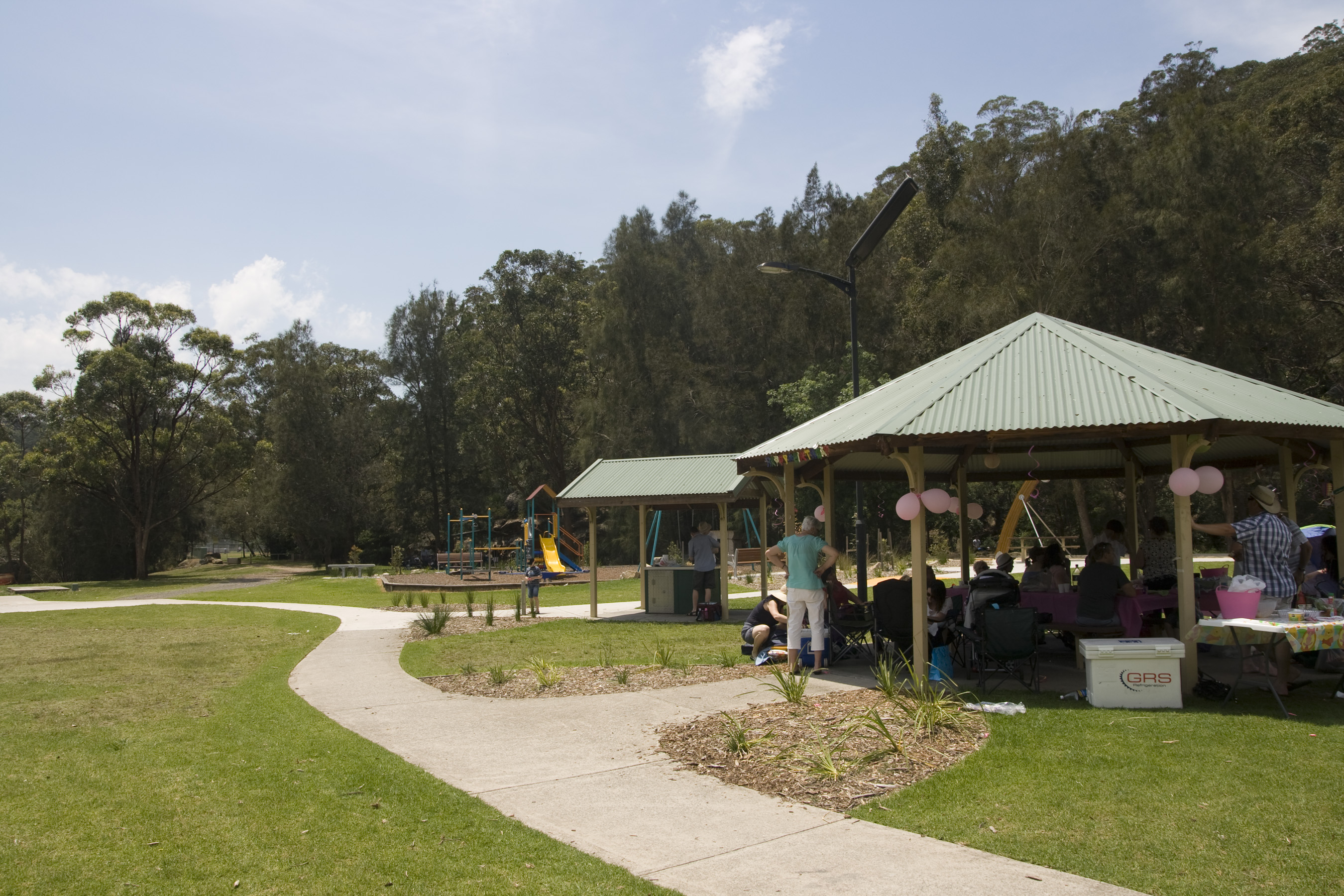
Bonnet Bay NSW 2226, Australia – Panorama #13

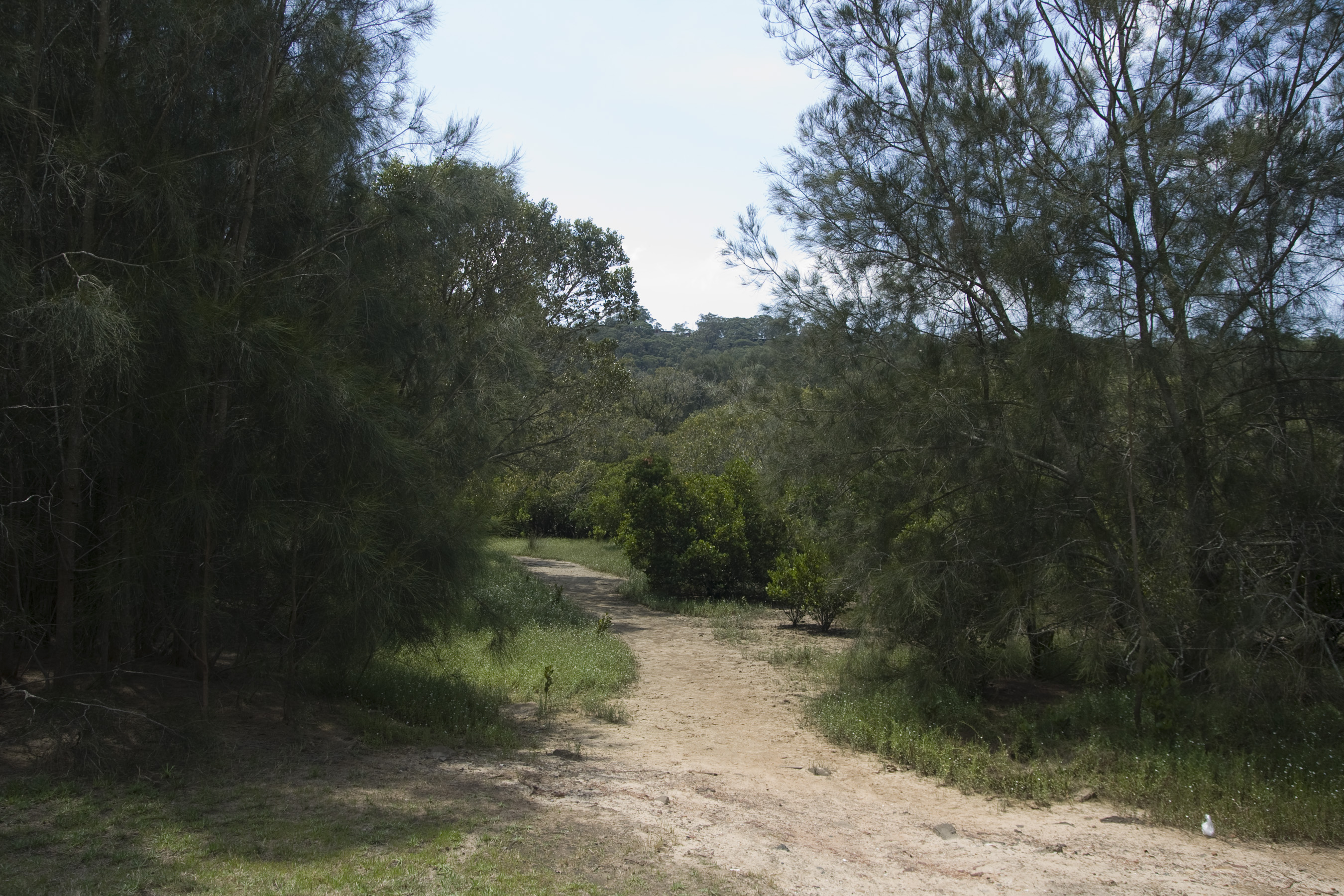
Bonnet Bay NSW 2226, Australia – Panorama #14

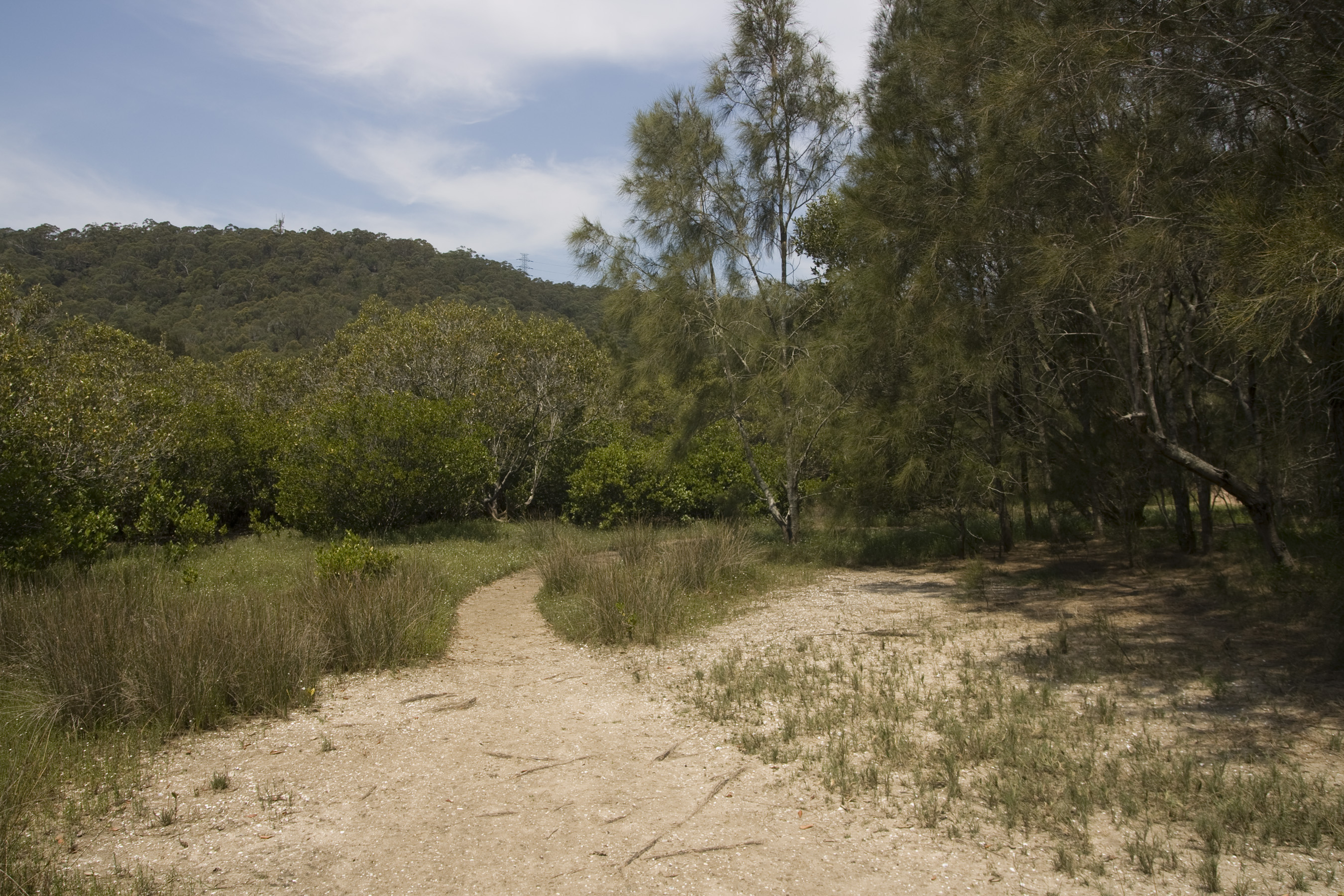
Bonnet Bay NSW 2226, Australia – Panorama #15

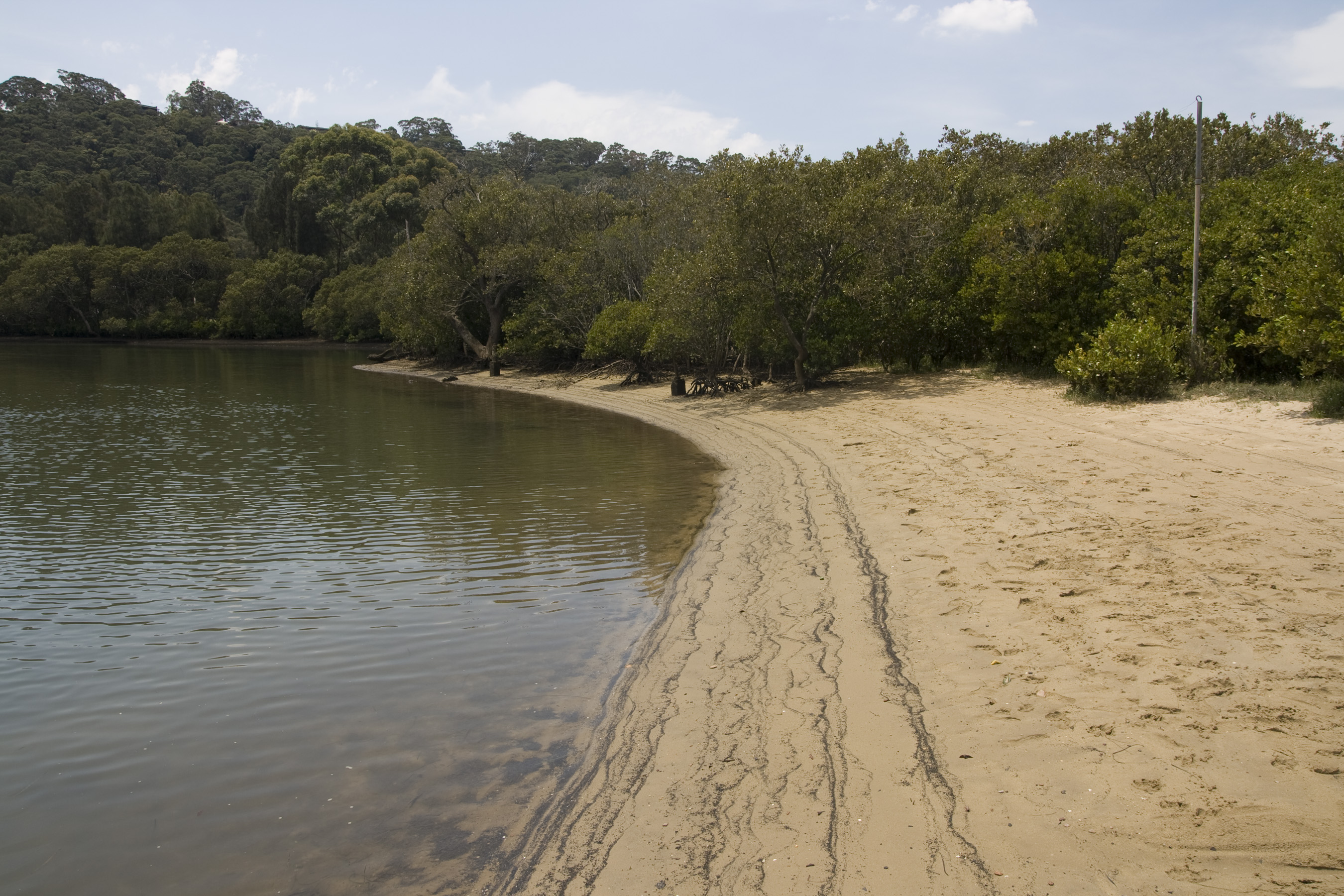
Bonnet Bay NSW 2226, Australia – Panorama #16

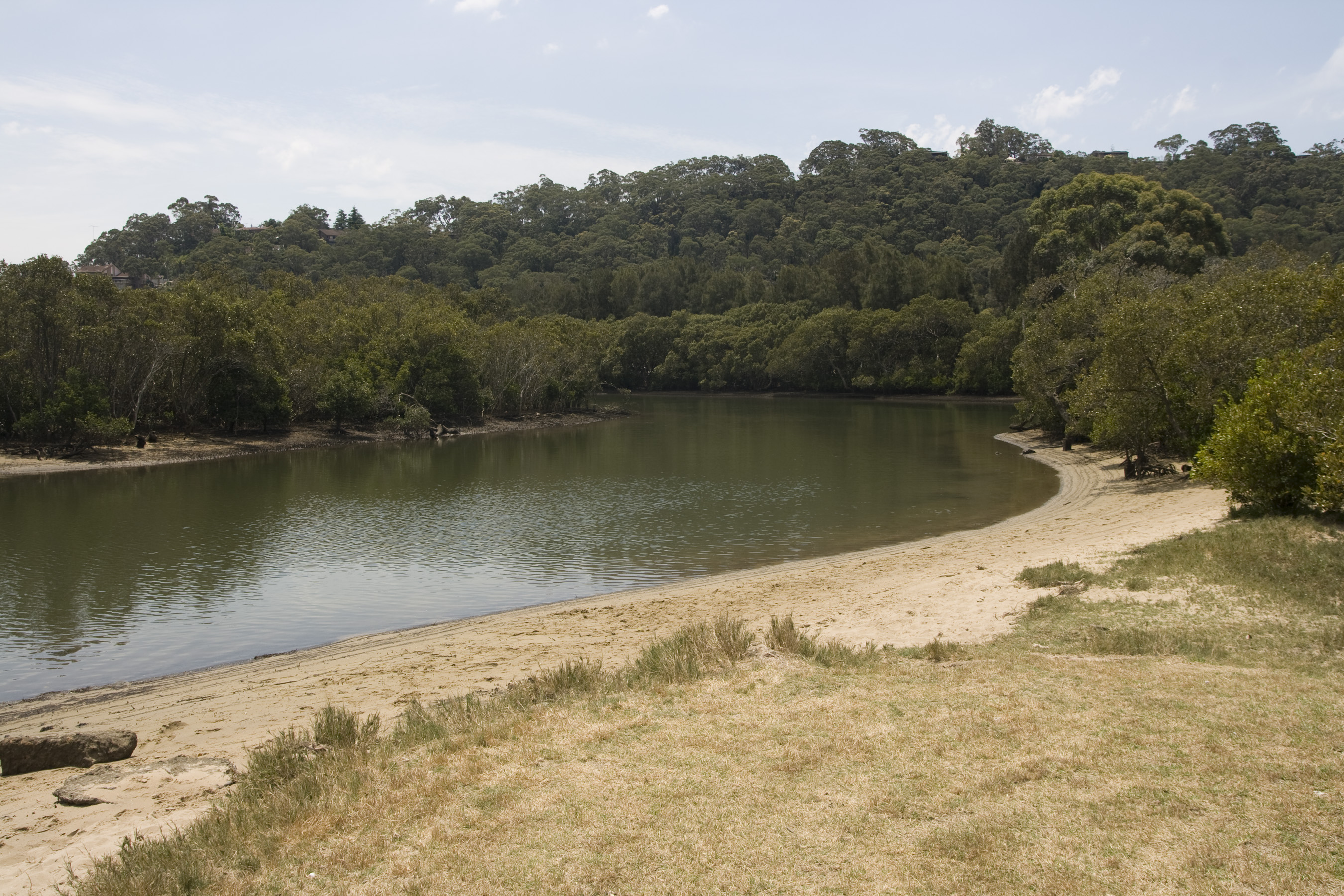
Bonnet Bay NSW 2226, Australia – Panorama #17

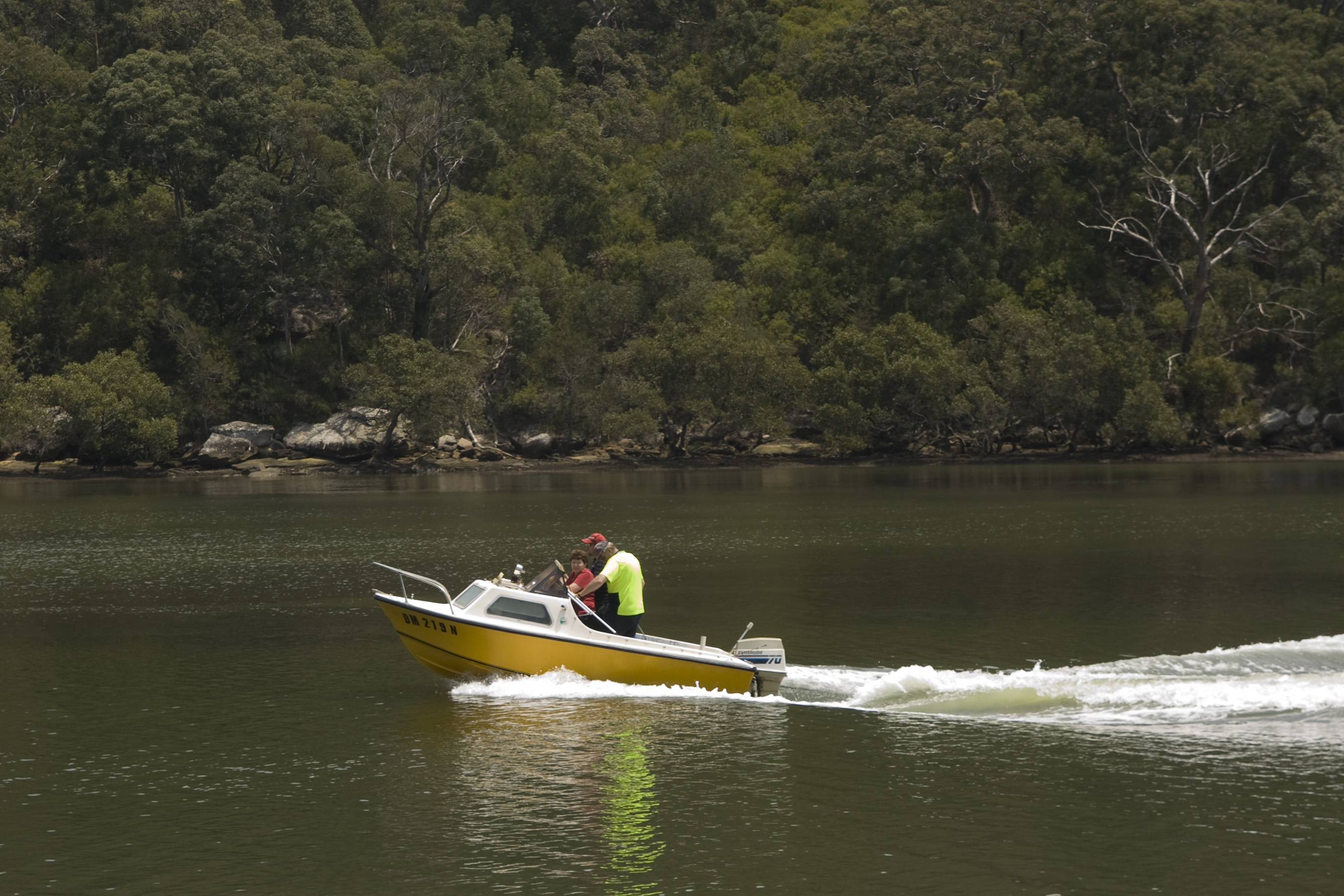
Bonnet Bay NSW 2226, Australia – Panorama #18

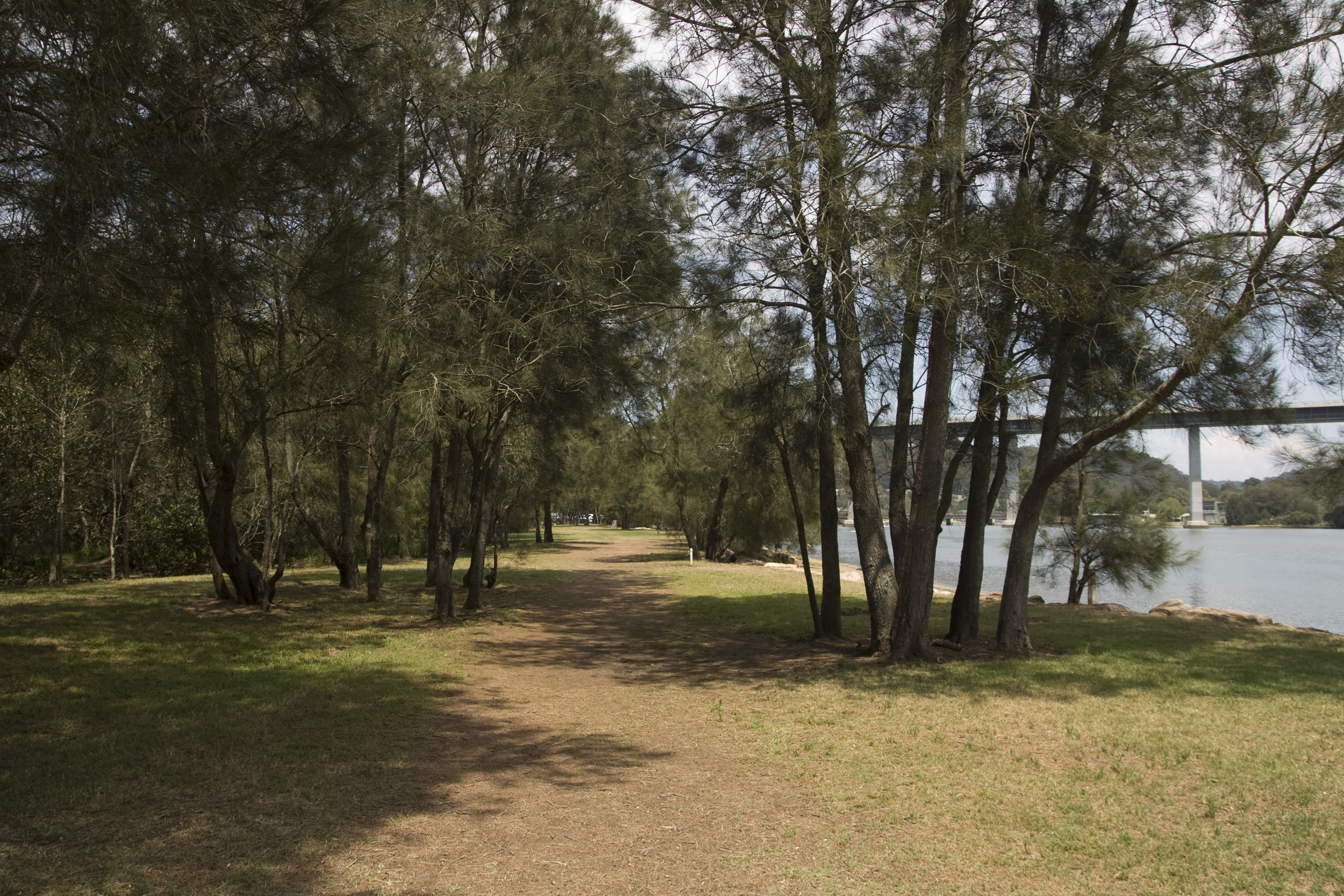
Bonnet Bay NSW 2226, Australia – Panorama #19

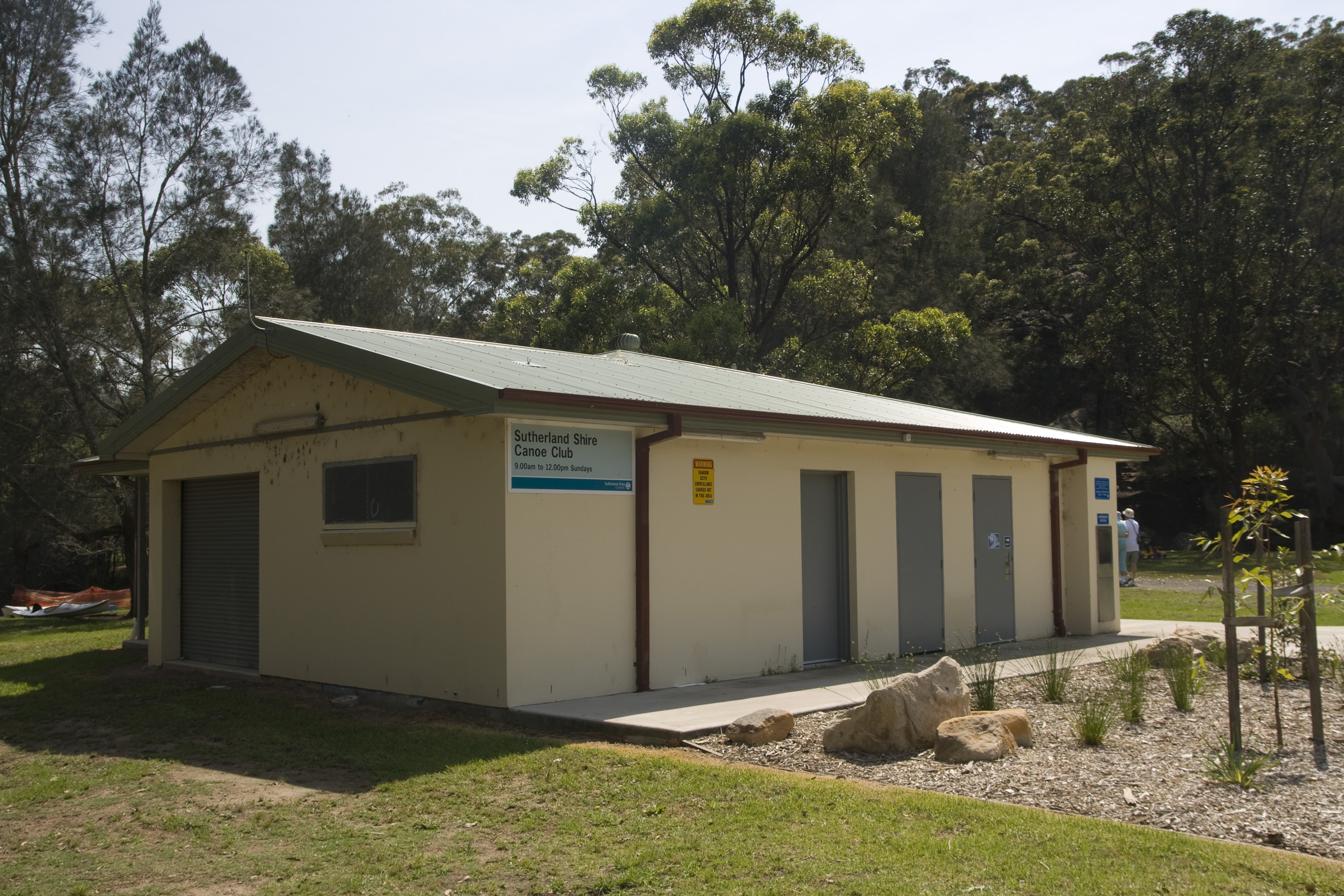
Bonnet Bay NSW 2226, Australia – Panorama #20

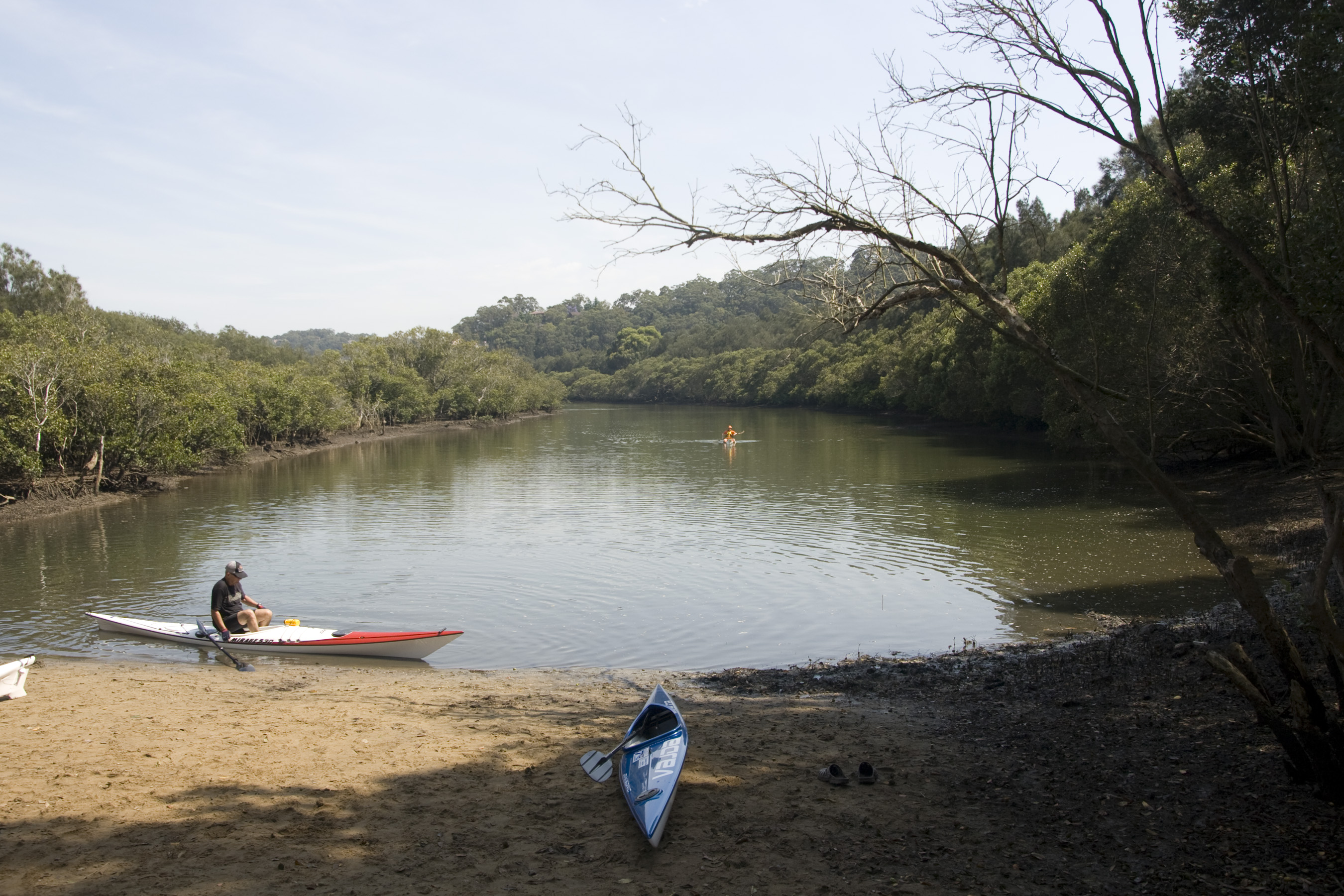
Bonnet Bay NSW 2226, Australia – Panorama #21

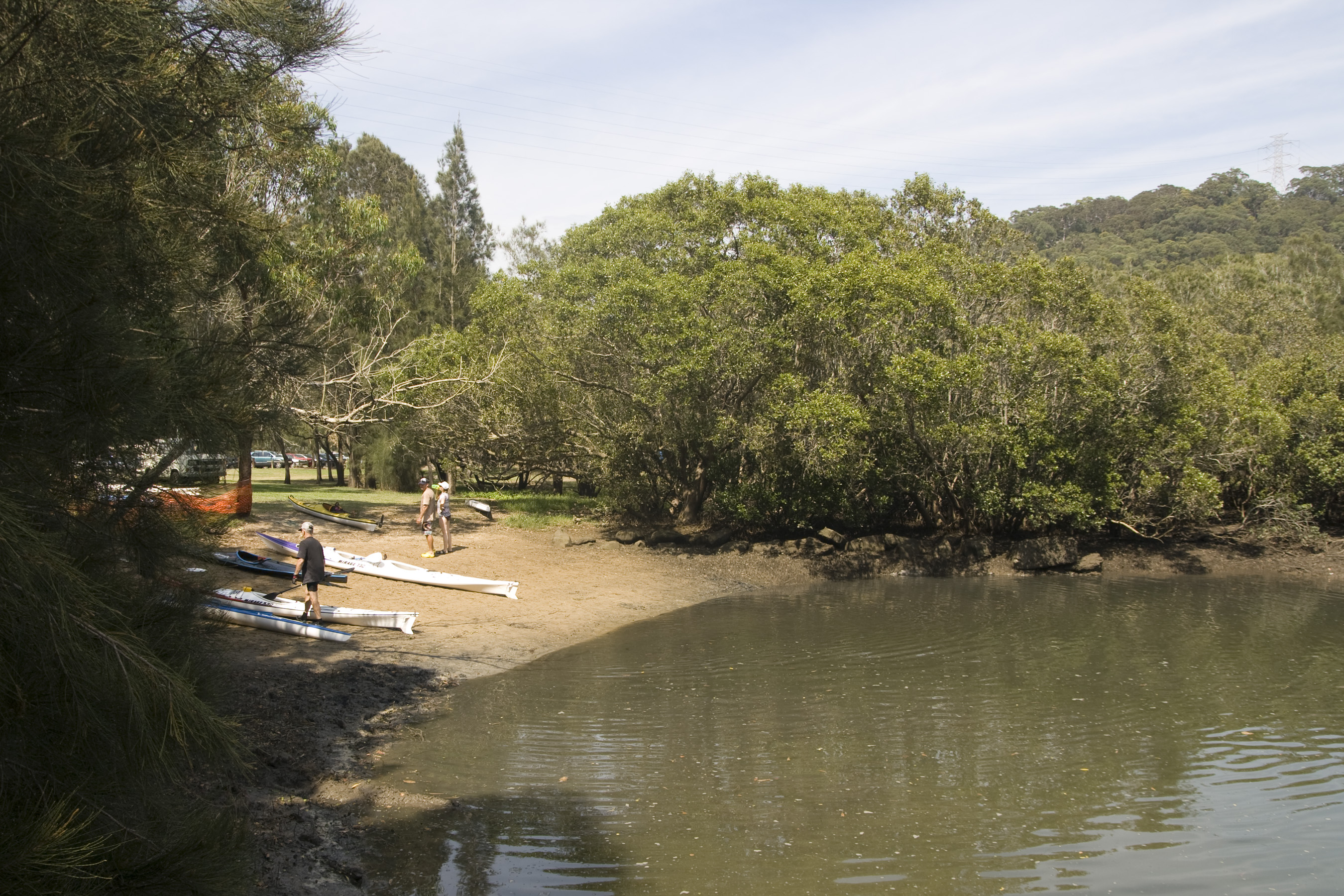
Bonnet Bay NSW 2226, Australia – Panorama #22

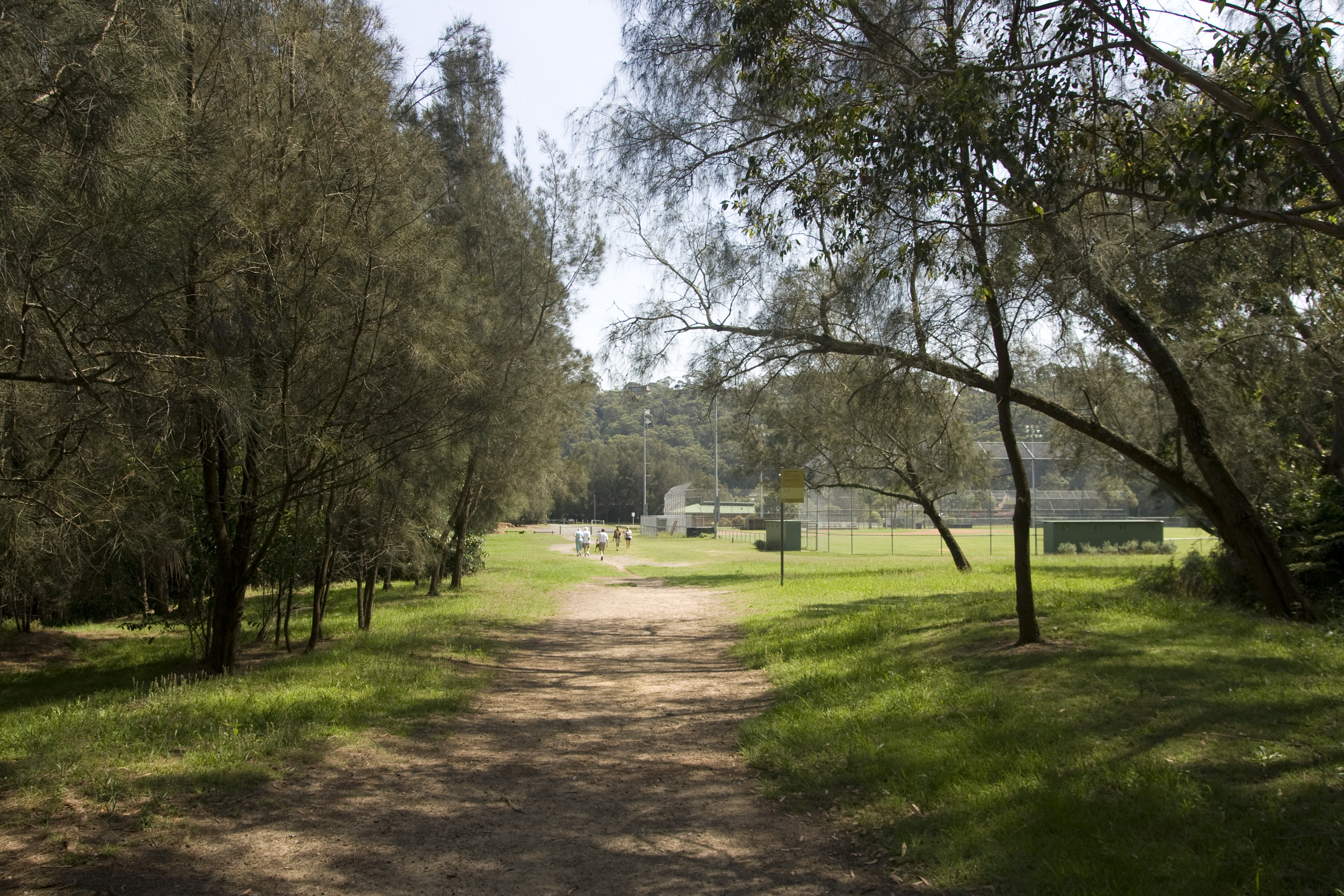
Bonnet Bay NSW 2226, Australia – Panorama #23

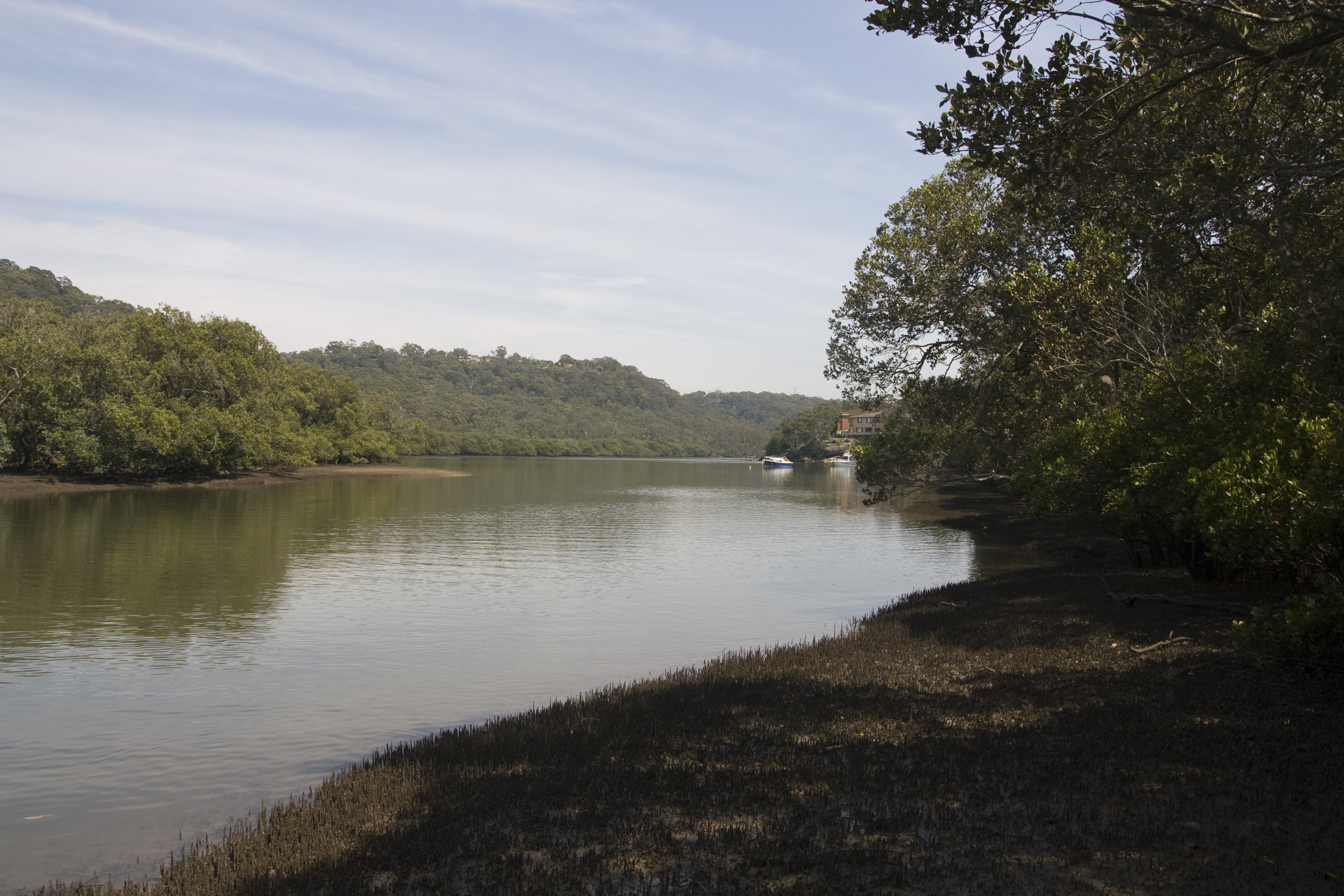
Bonnet Bay NSW 2226, Australia – Panorama #24

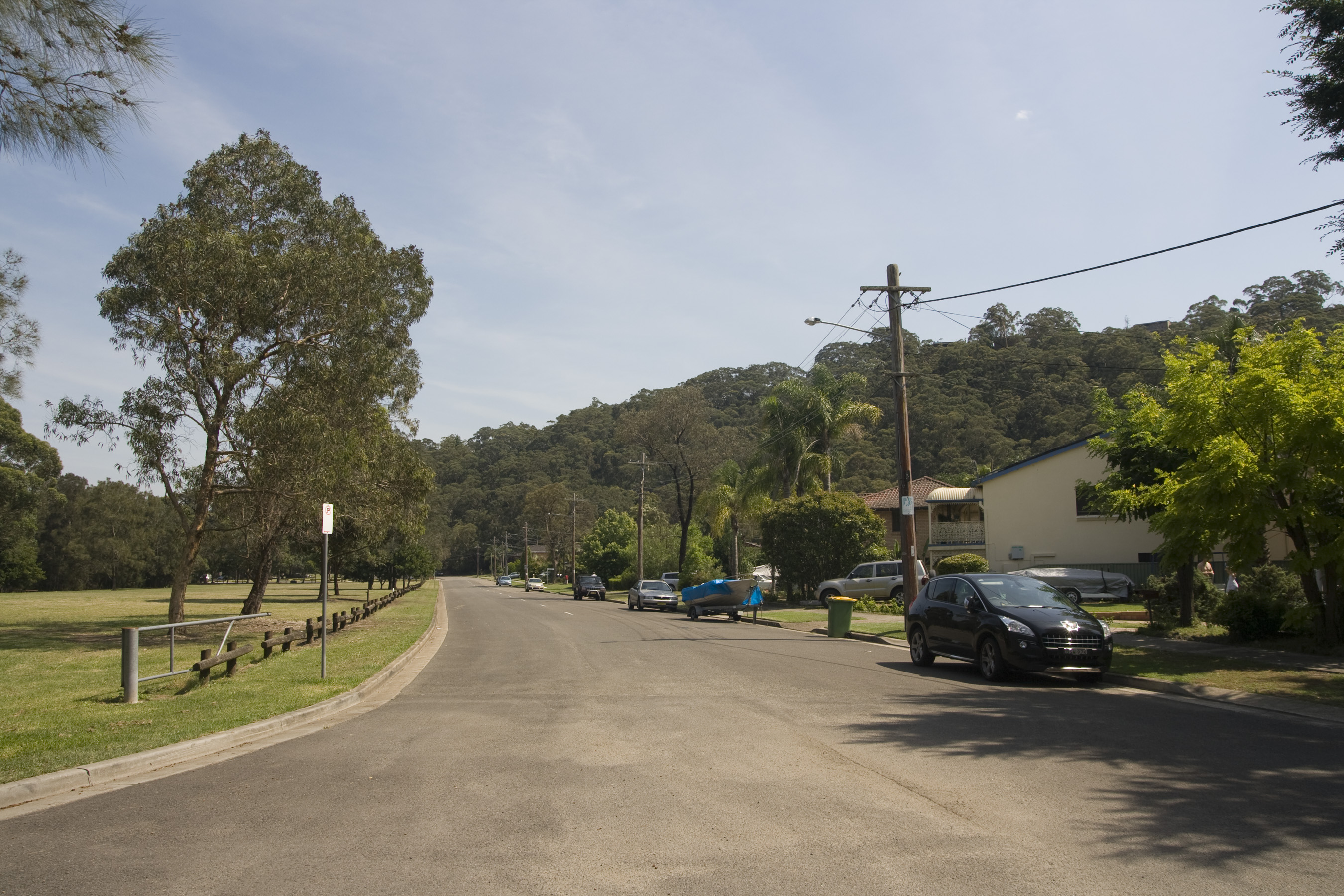
Washington Drive, Bonnet Bay (#1)

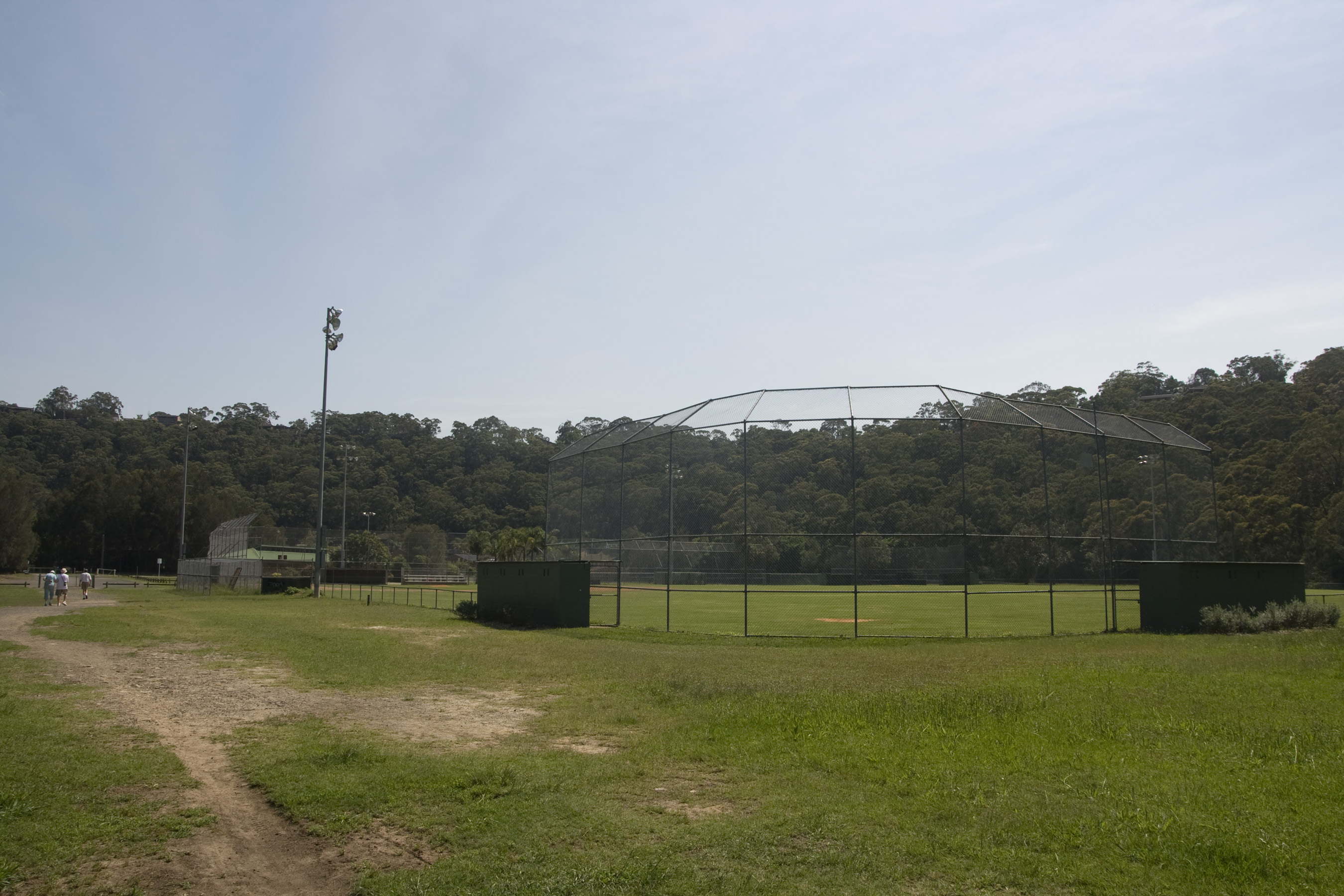
Bonnet Bay NSW 2226, Australia – Panorama #25

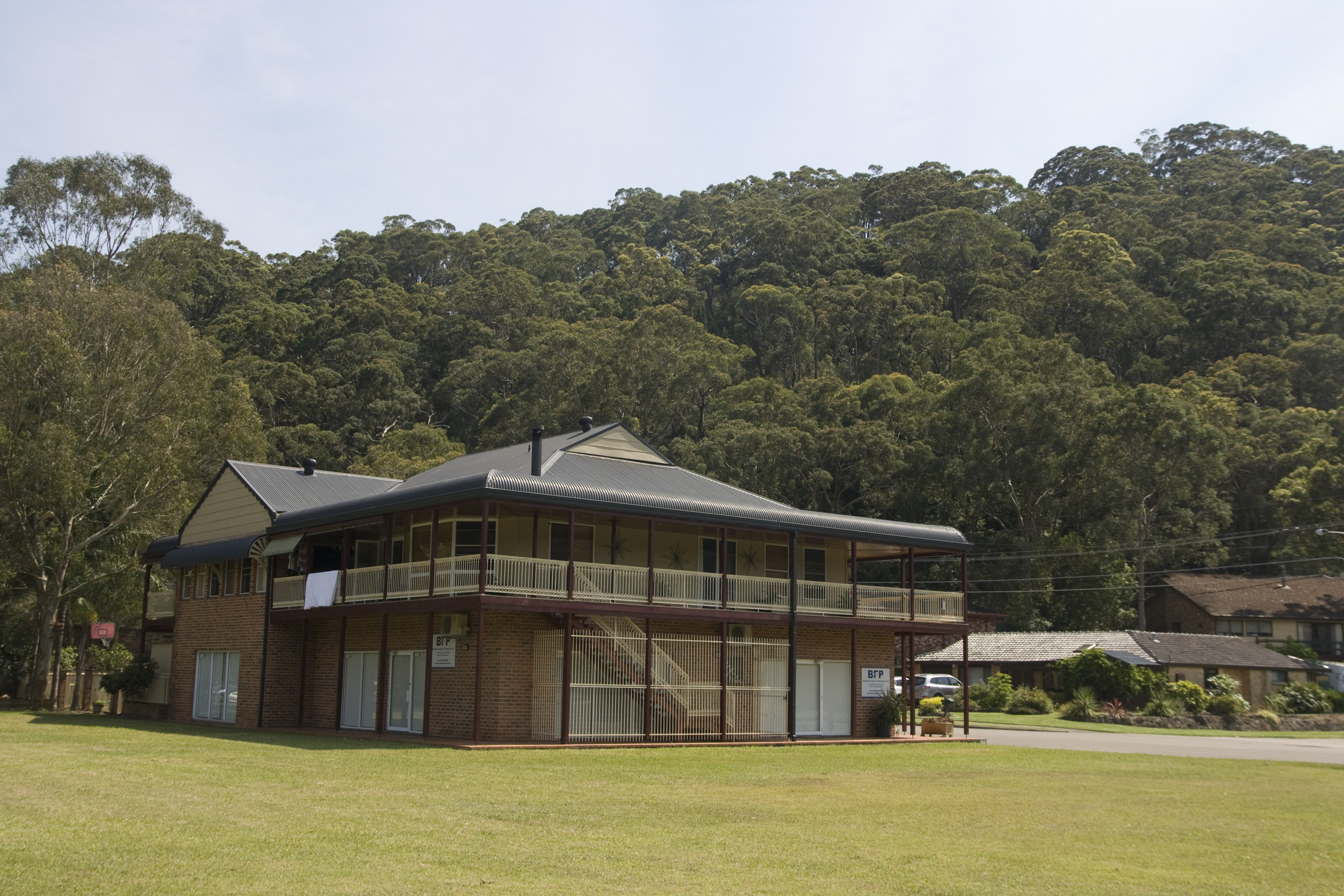
Bonnet Bay NSW 2226, Australia – Panorama #26

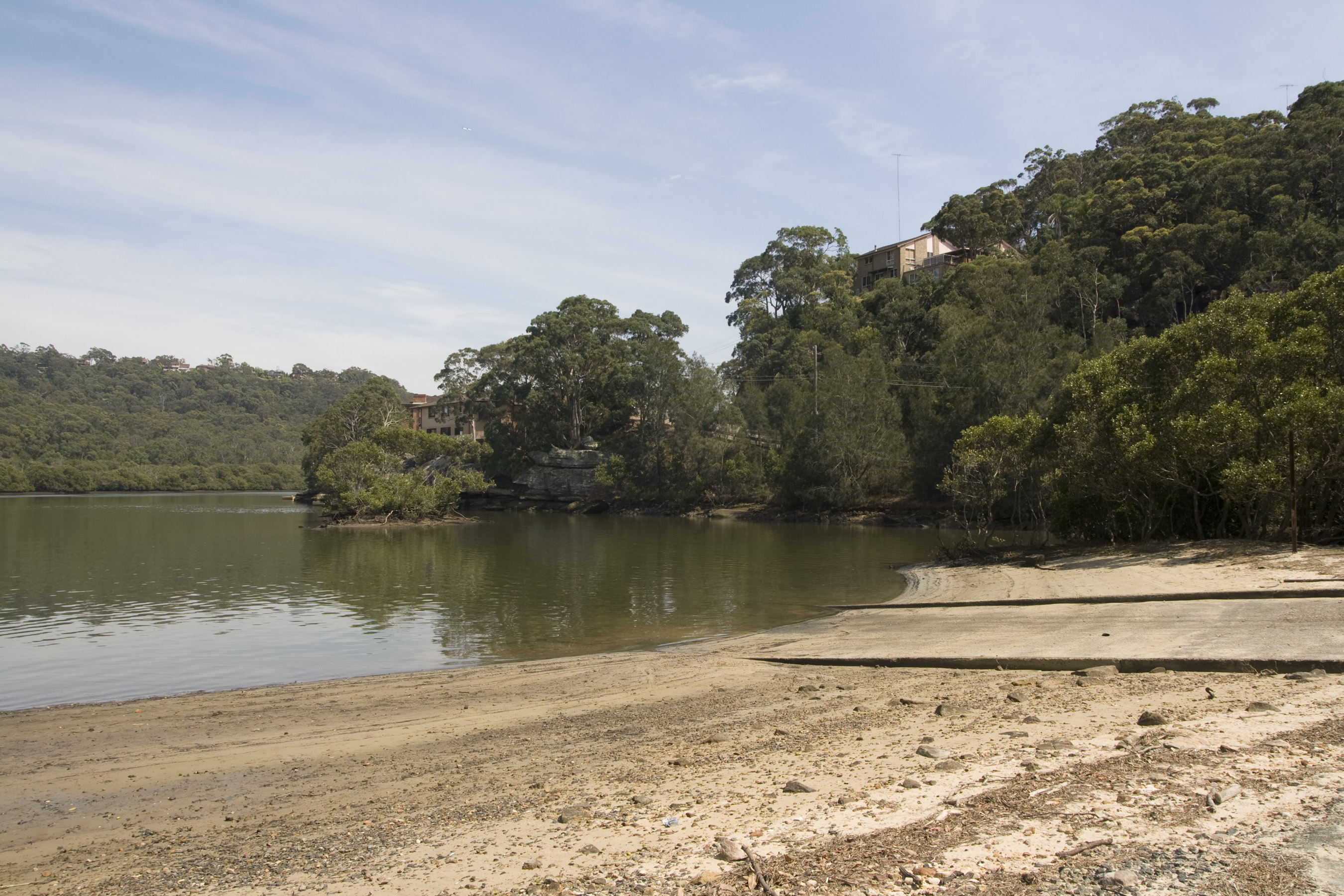
Bonnet Bay NSW 2226, Australia – Panorama #27

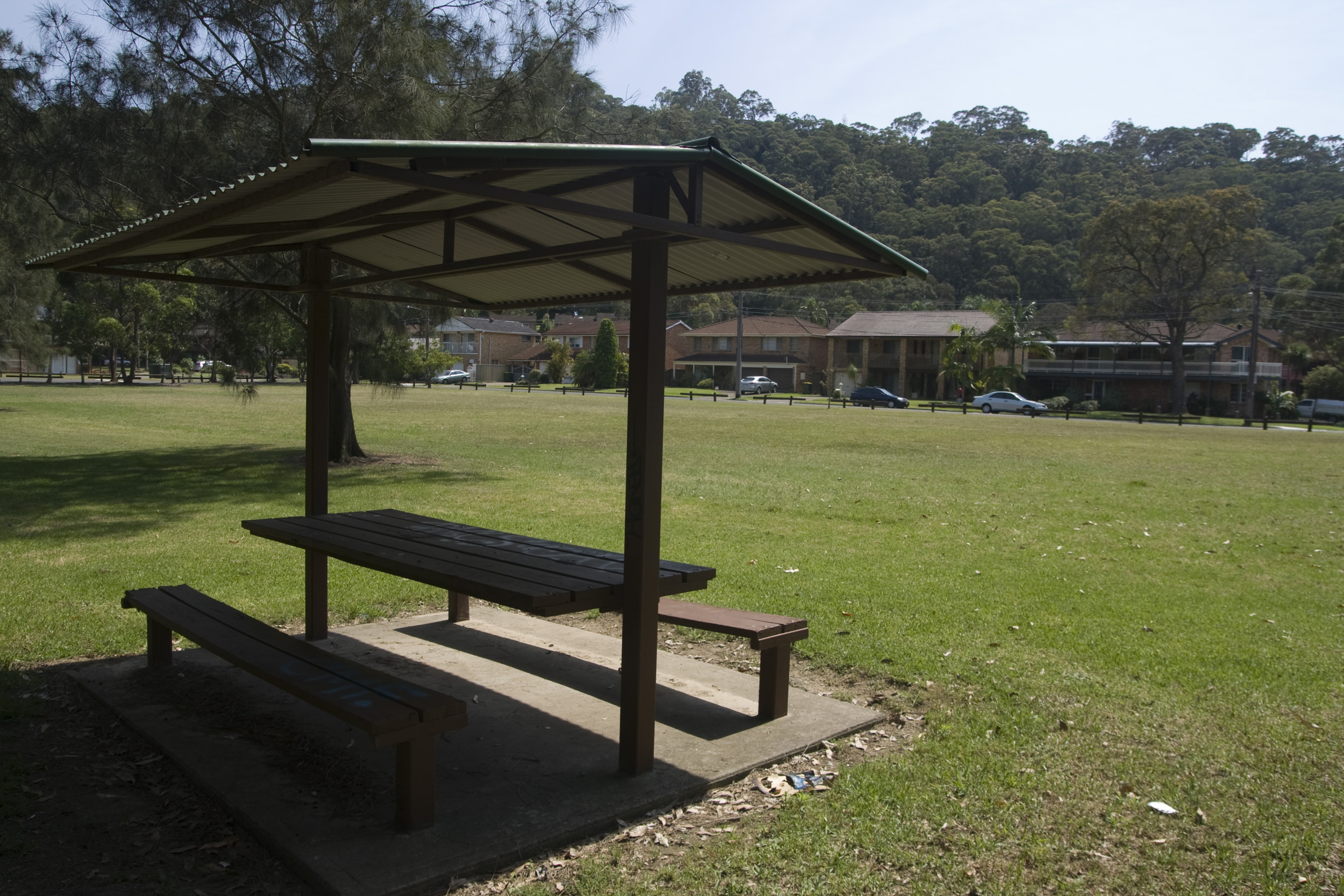
Bonnet Bay NSW 2226, Australia – Panorama #28

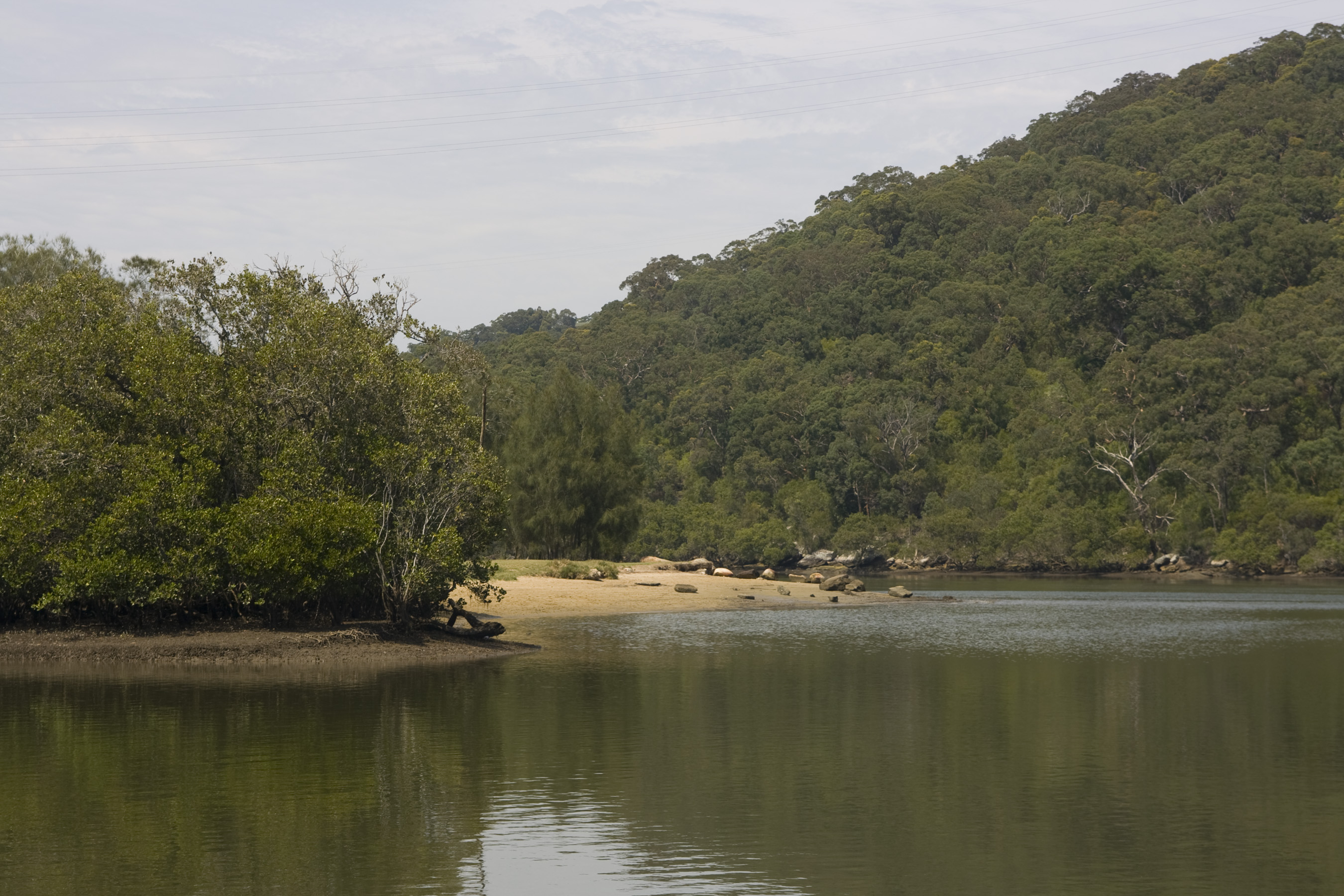
Bonnet Bay NSW 2226, Australia – Panorama #29

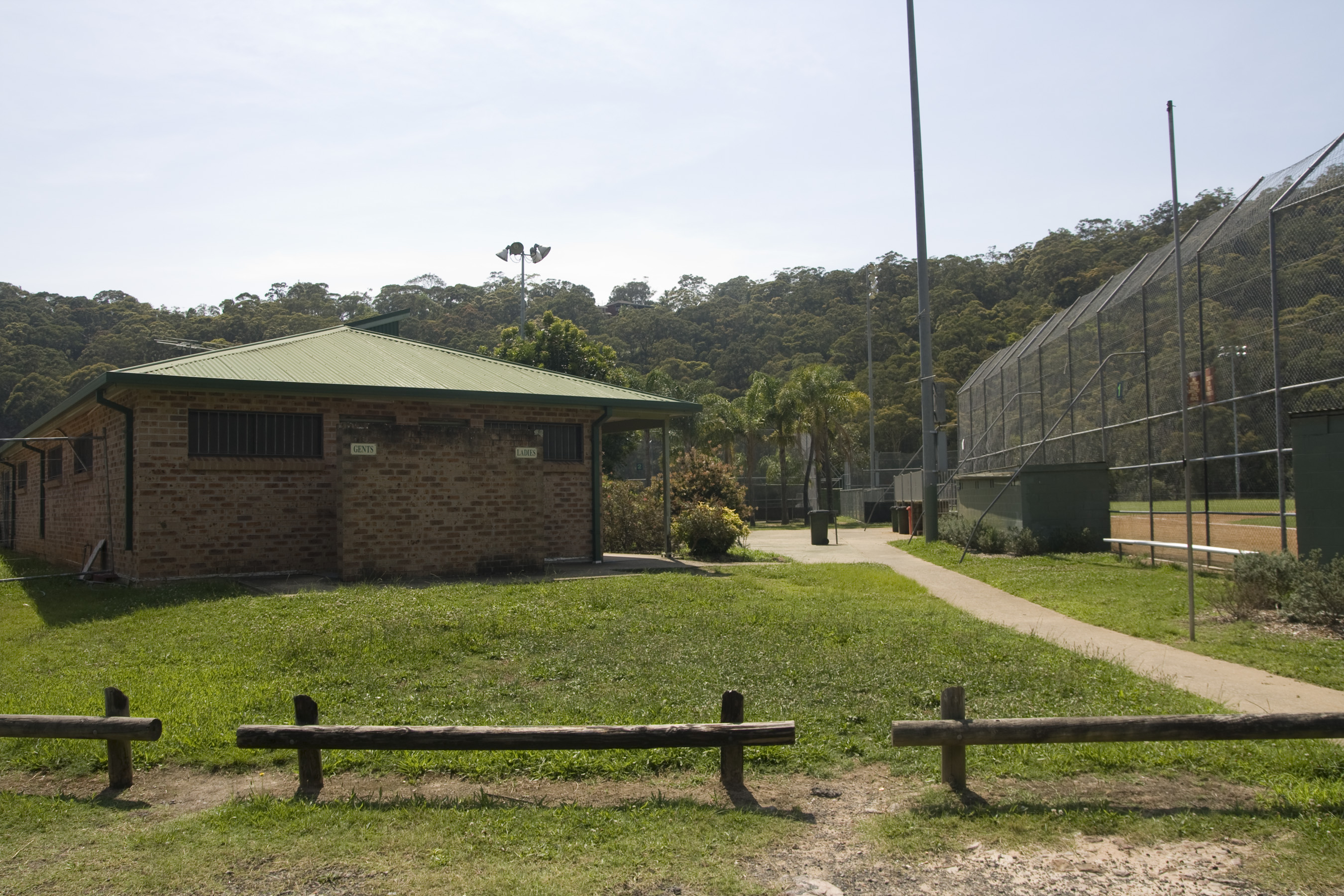
Bonnet Bay NSW 2226, Australia – Panorama #30

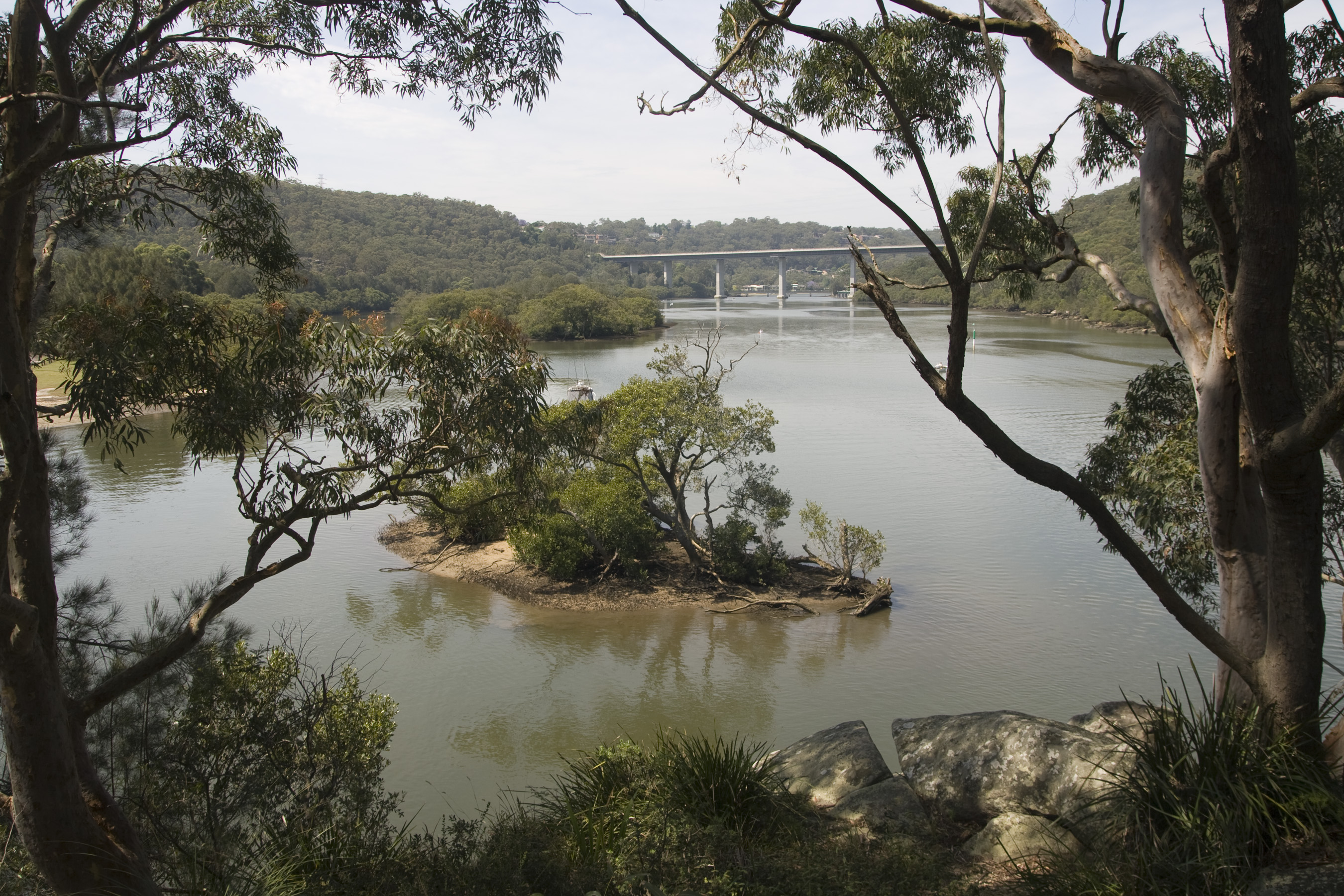
Bonnet Bay NSW 2226, Australia – Panorama #31

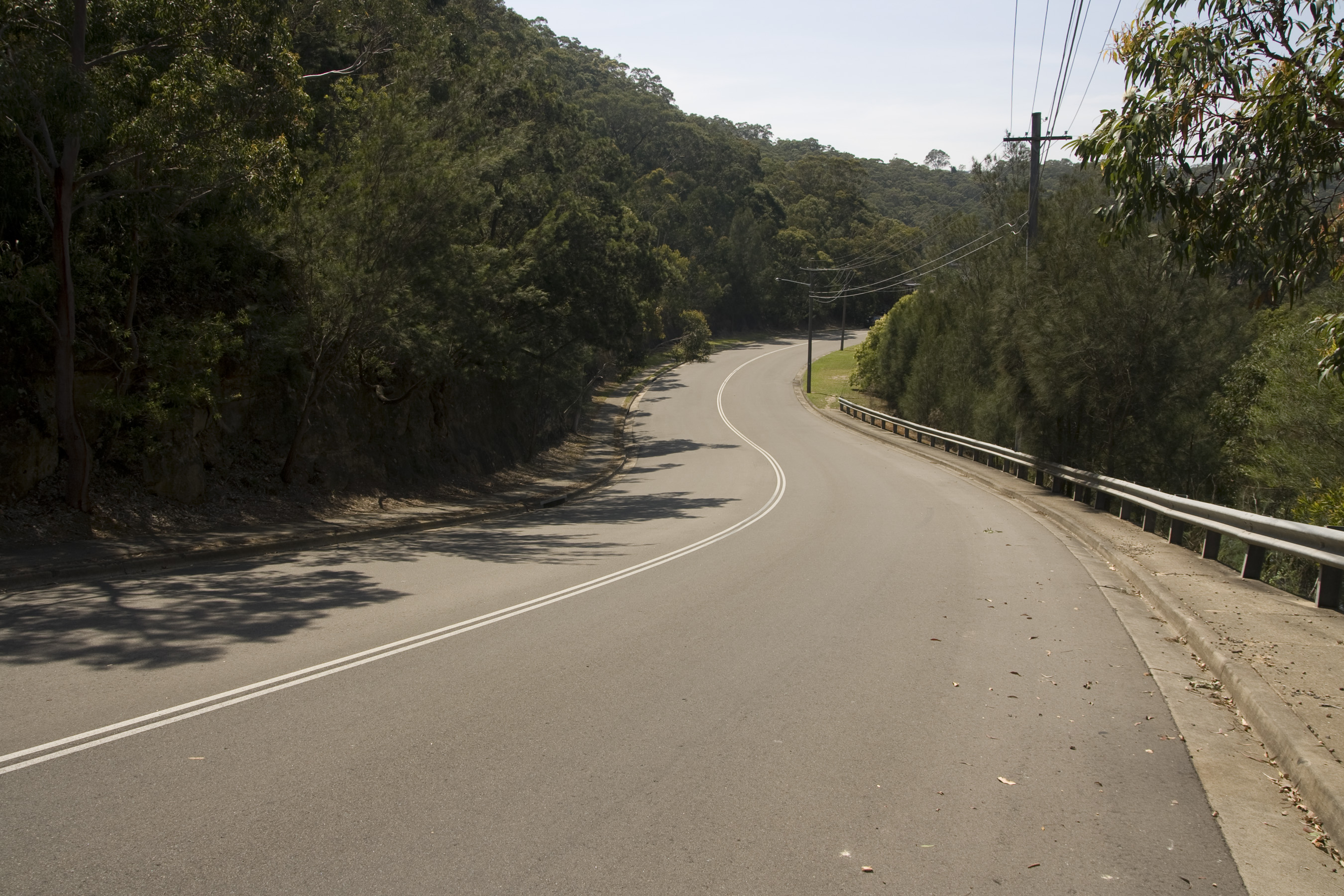
Washington Drive, Bonnet Bay (#2)

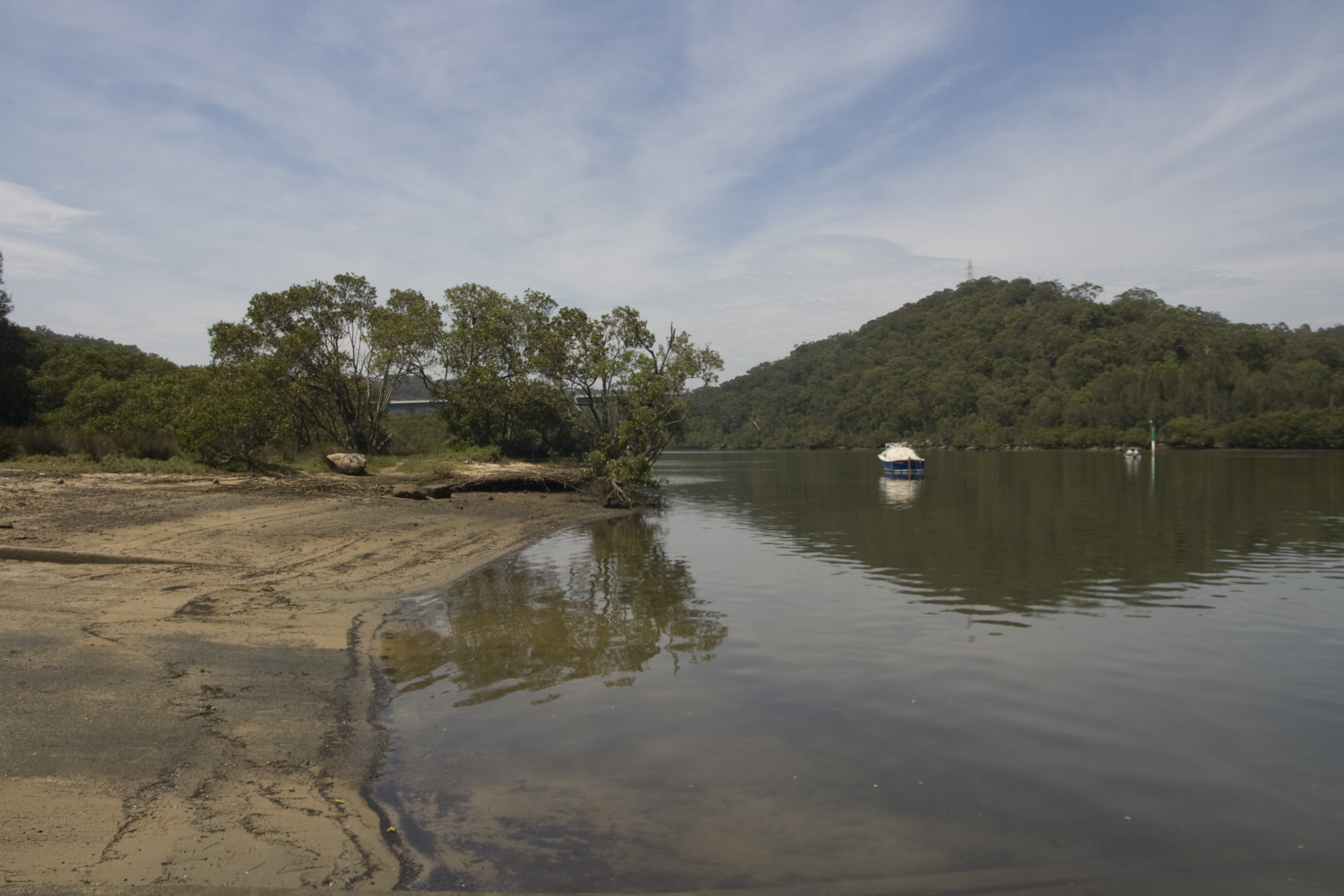
Bonnet Bay NSW 2226, Australia – Panorama #32

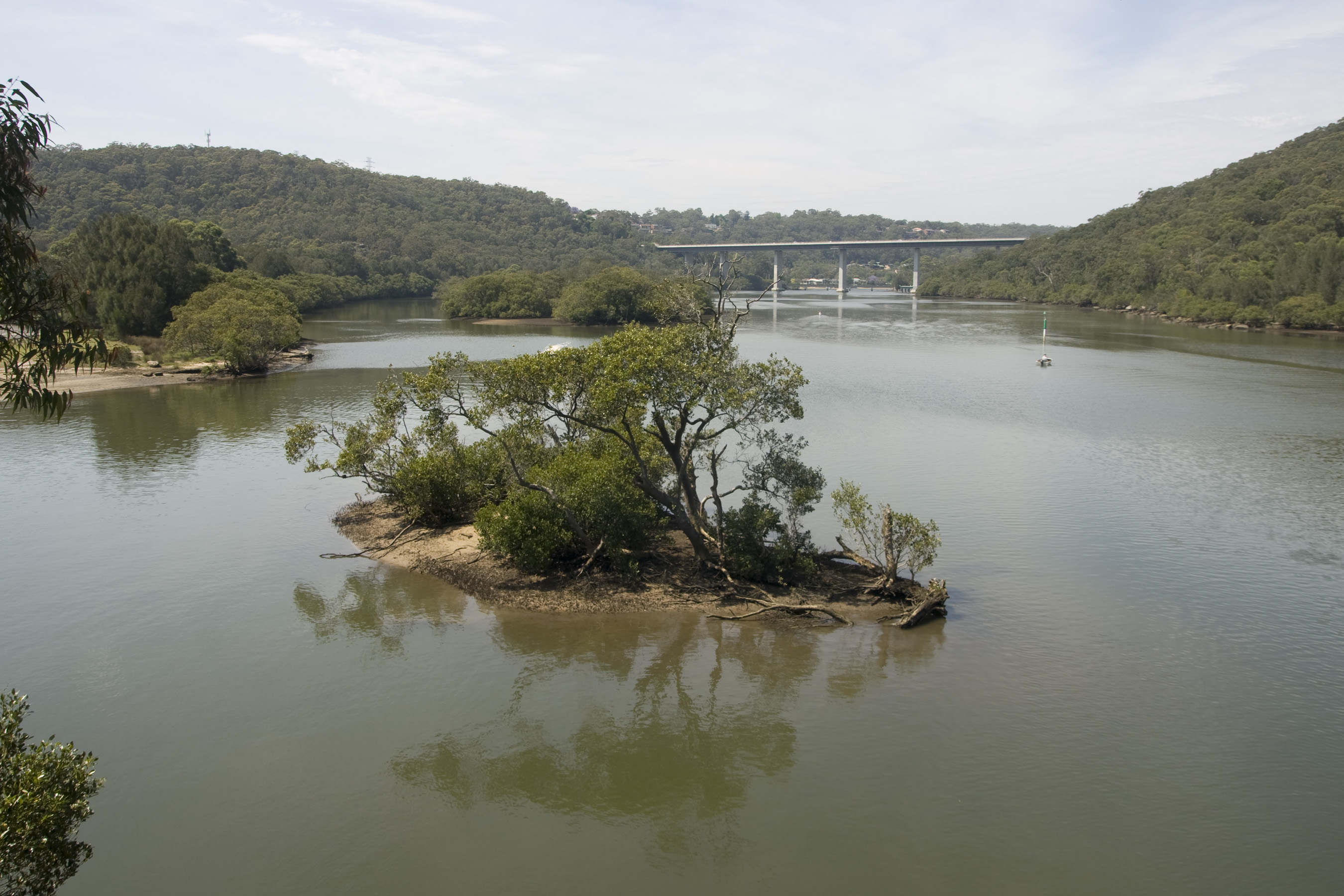
Bonnet Bay NSW 2226, Australia – Panorama #33

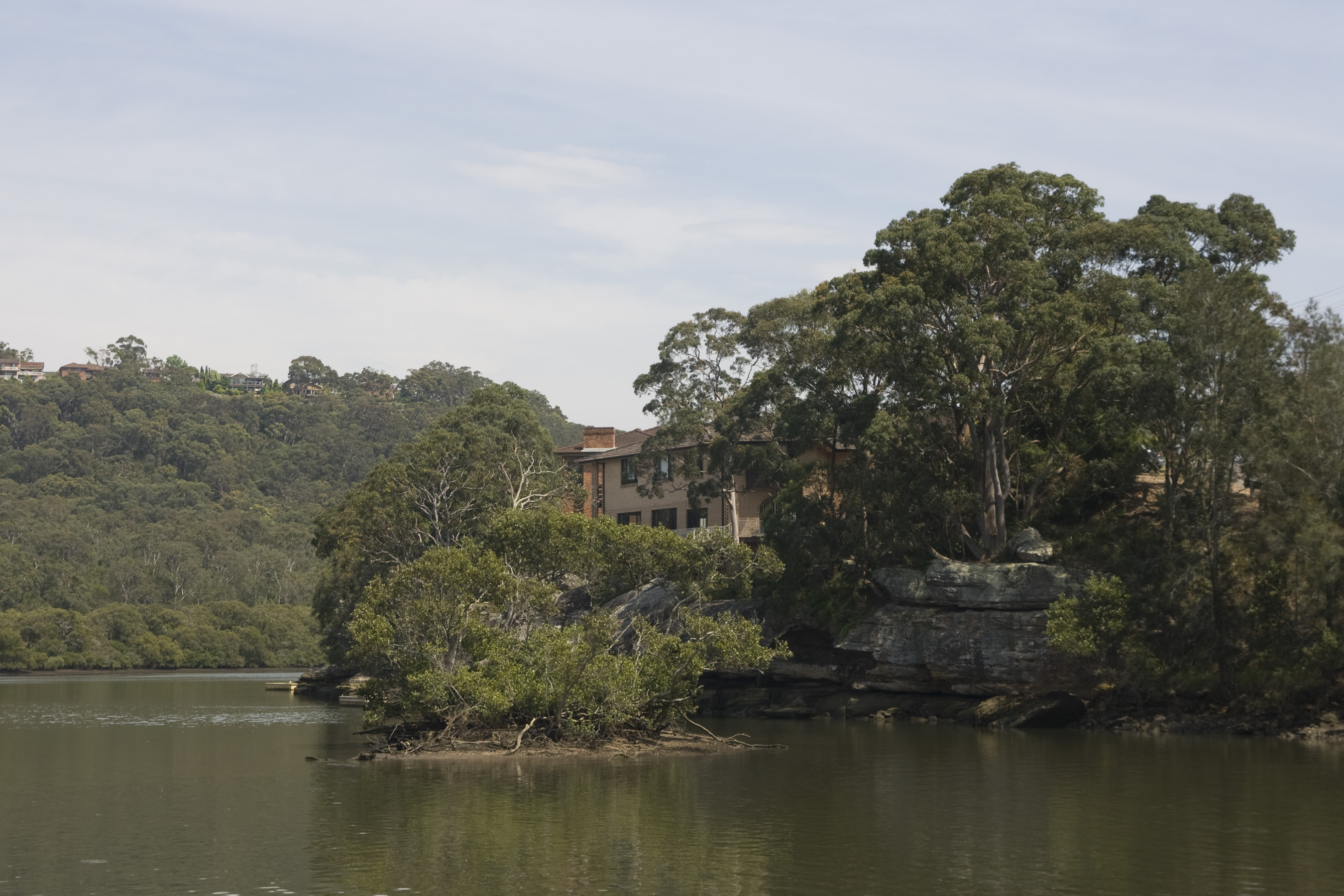
Bonnet Bay NSW 2226, Australia – Panorama #34

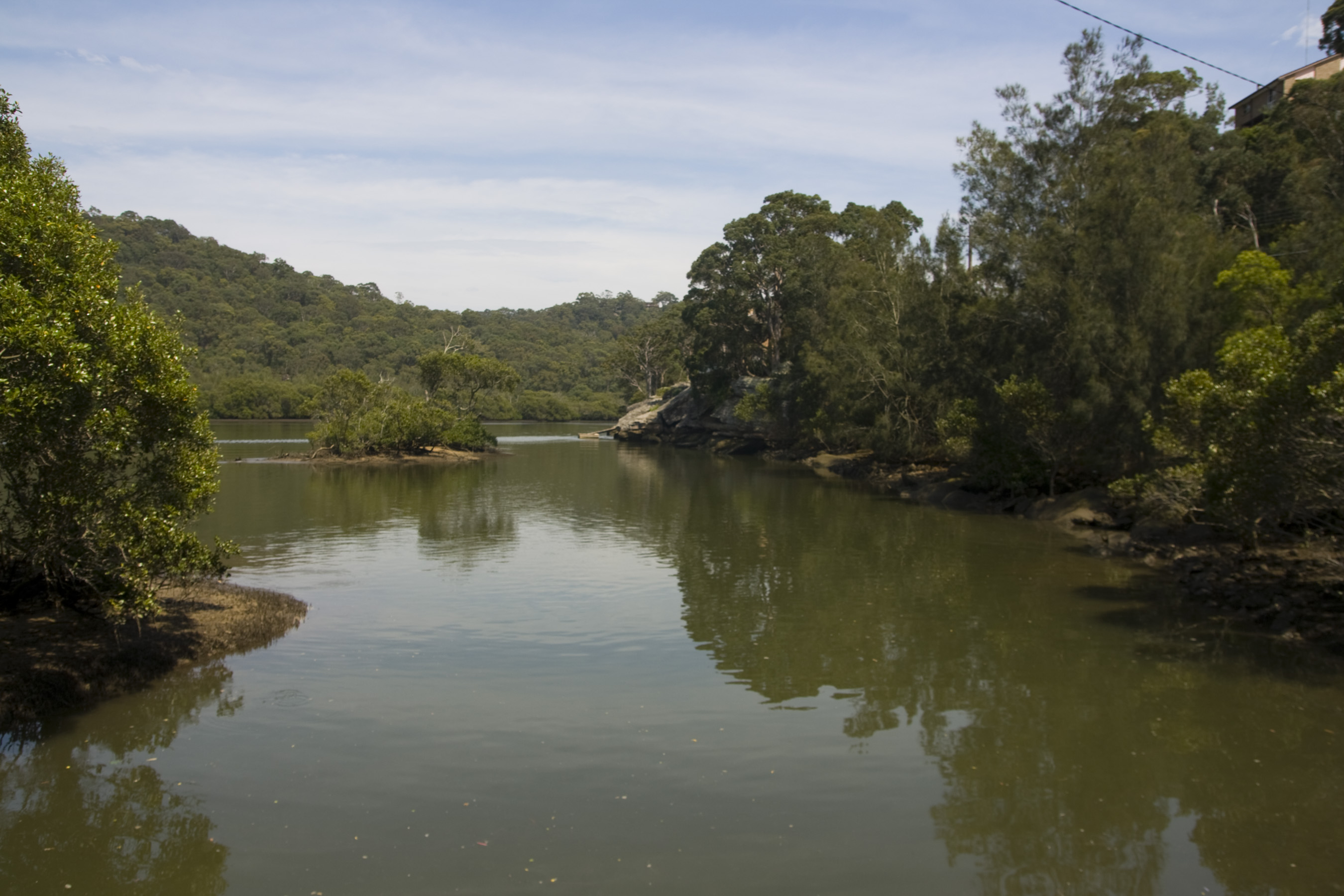
Bonnet Bay NSW 2226, Australia – Panorama #35

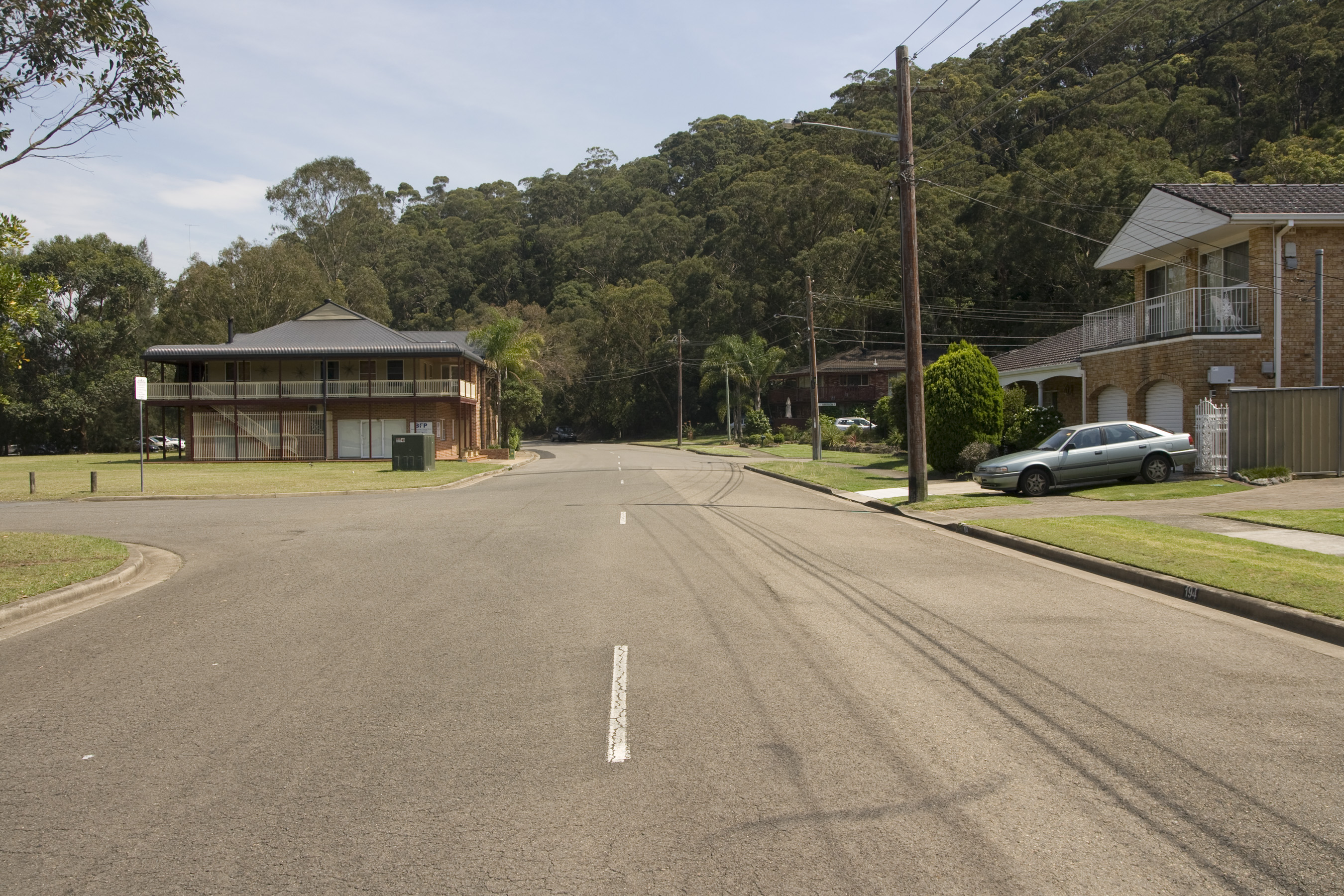
Bonnet Bay NSW 2226, Australia – Panorama #36

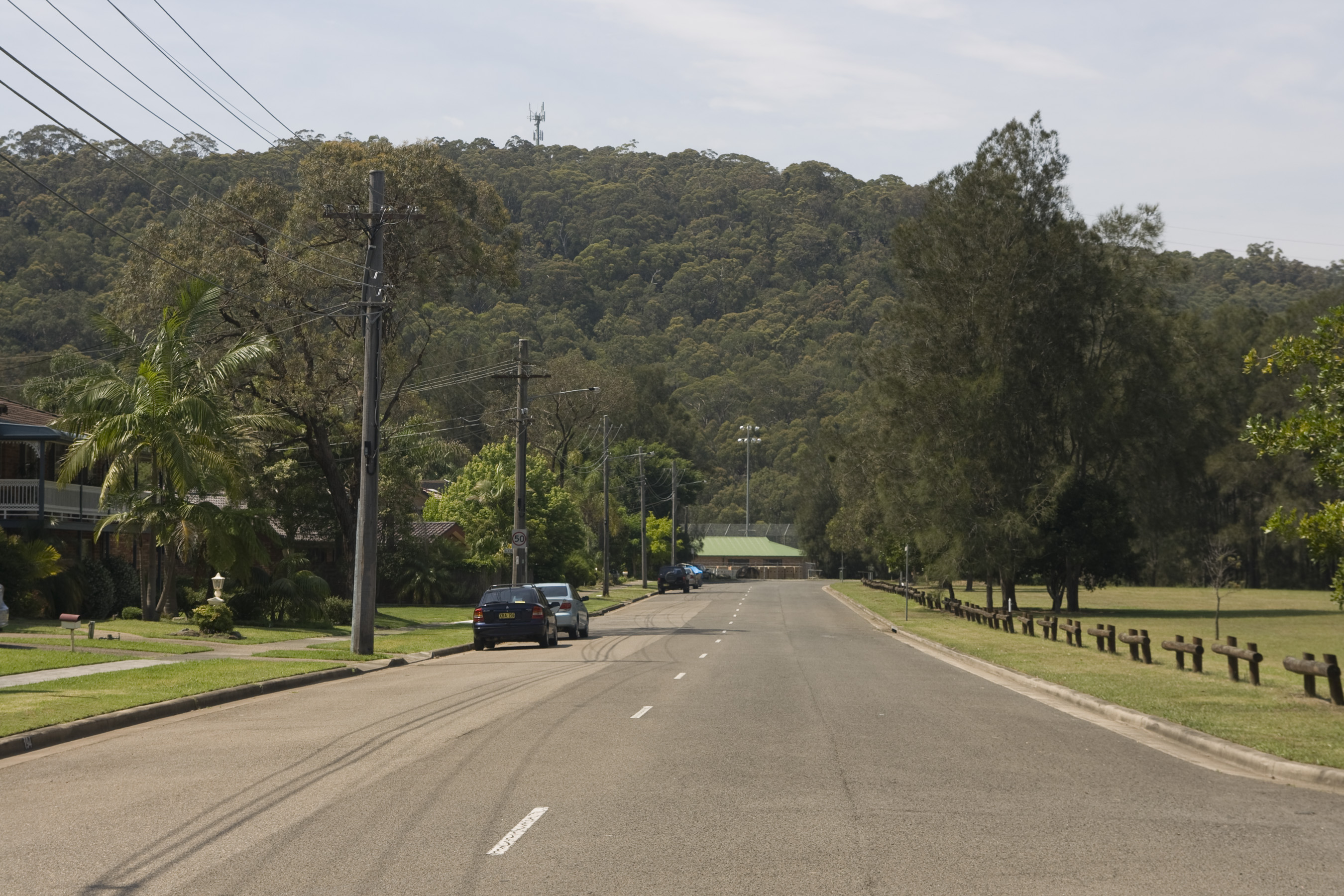
Washington Drive, Bonnet Bay (#3)

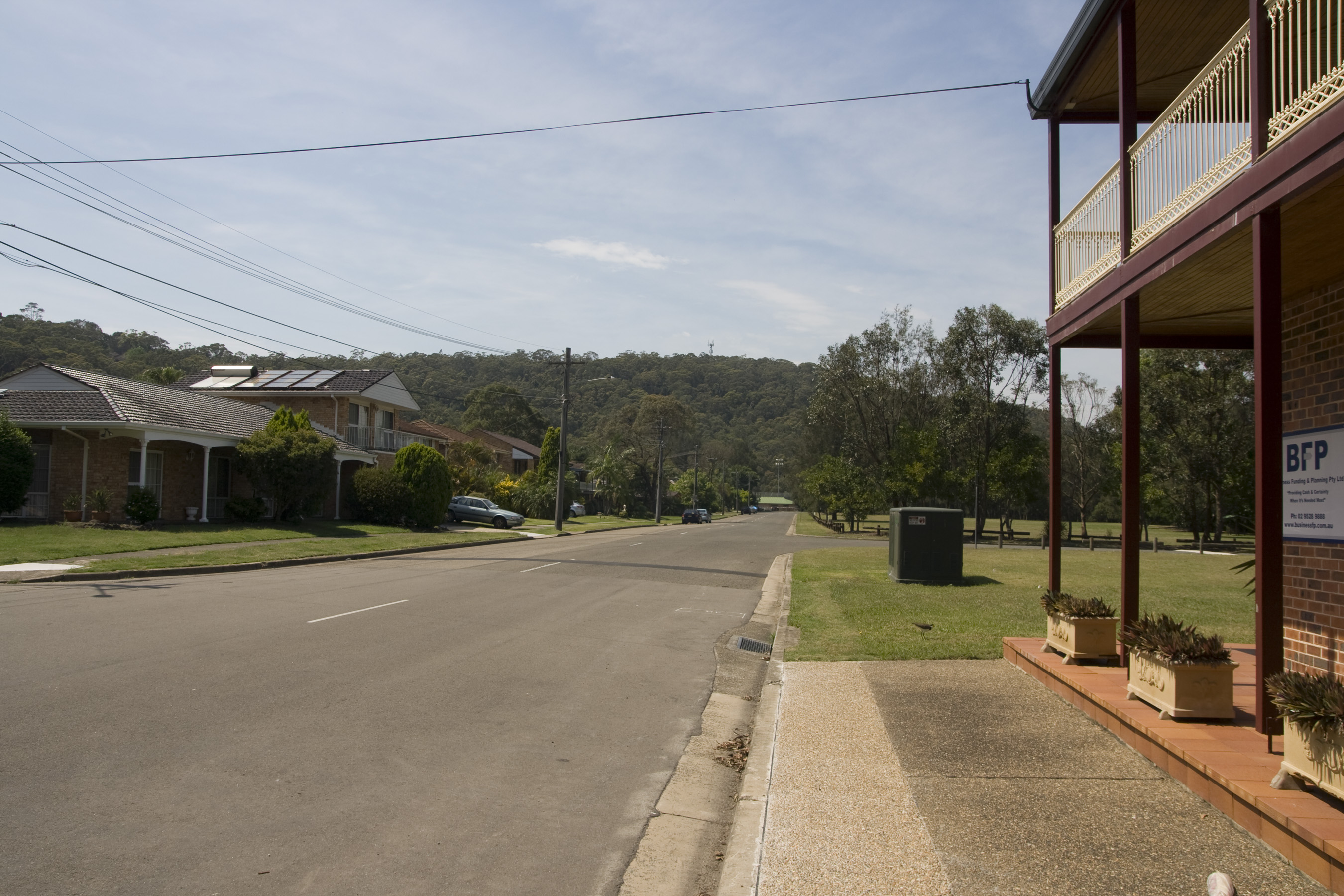
Washington Drive, Bonnet Bay (#4)

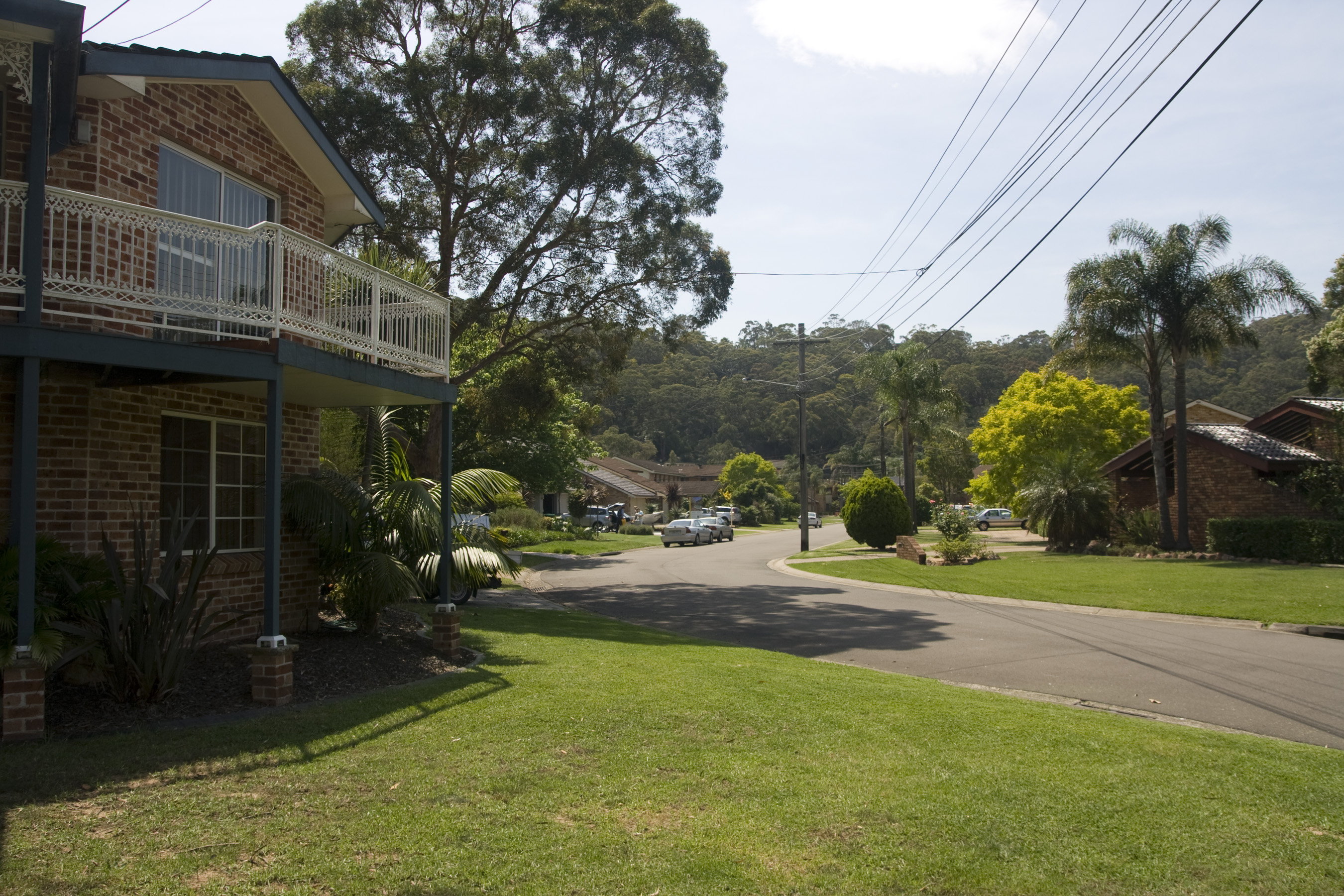
McKinley Ave, Bonnet Bay (#1)

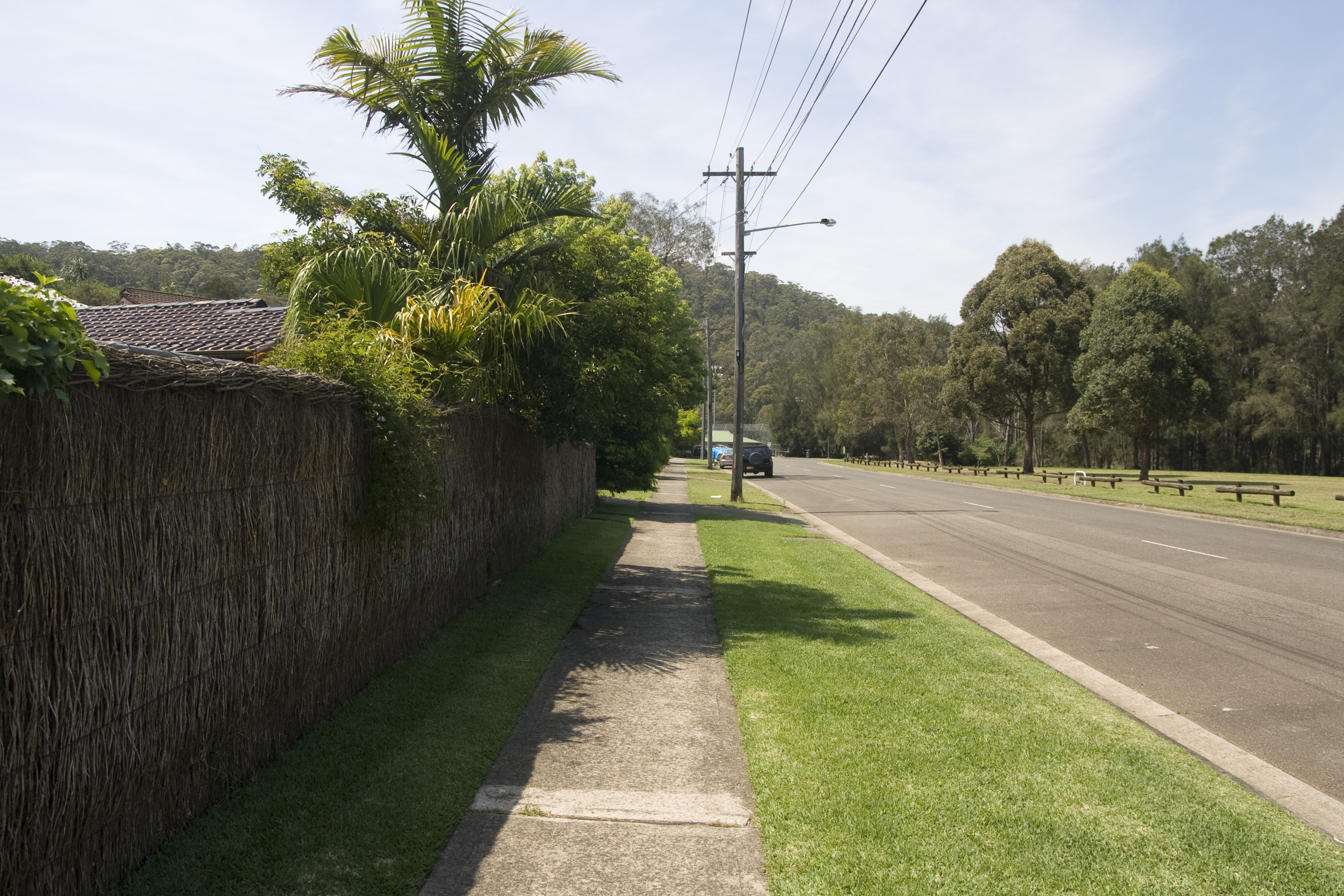
Washington Drive, Bonnet Bay (#5)

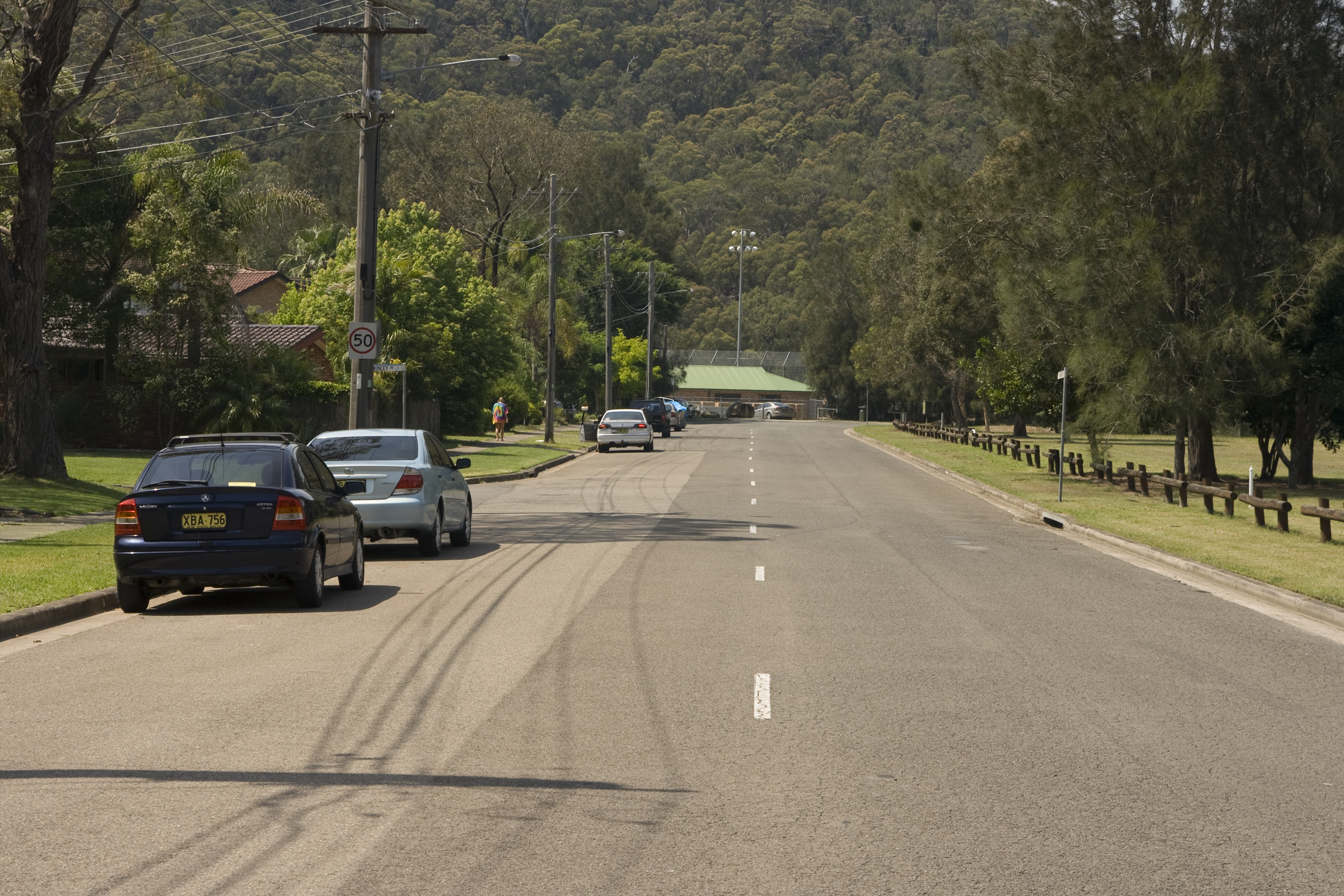
Washington Drive, Bonnet Bay (#6)

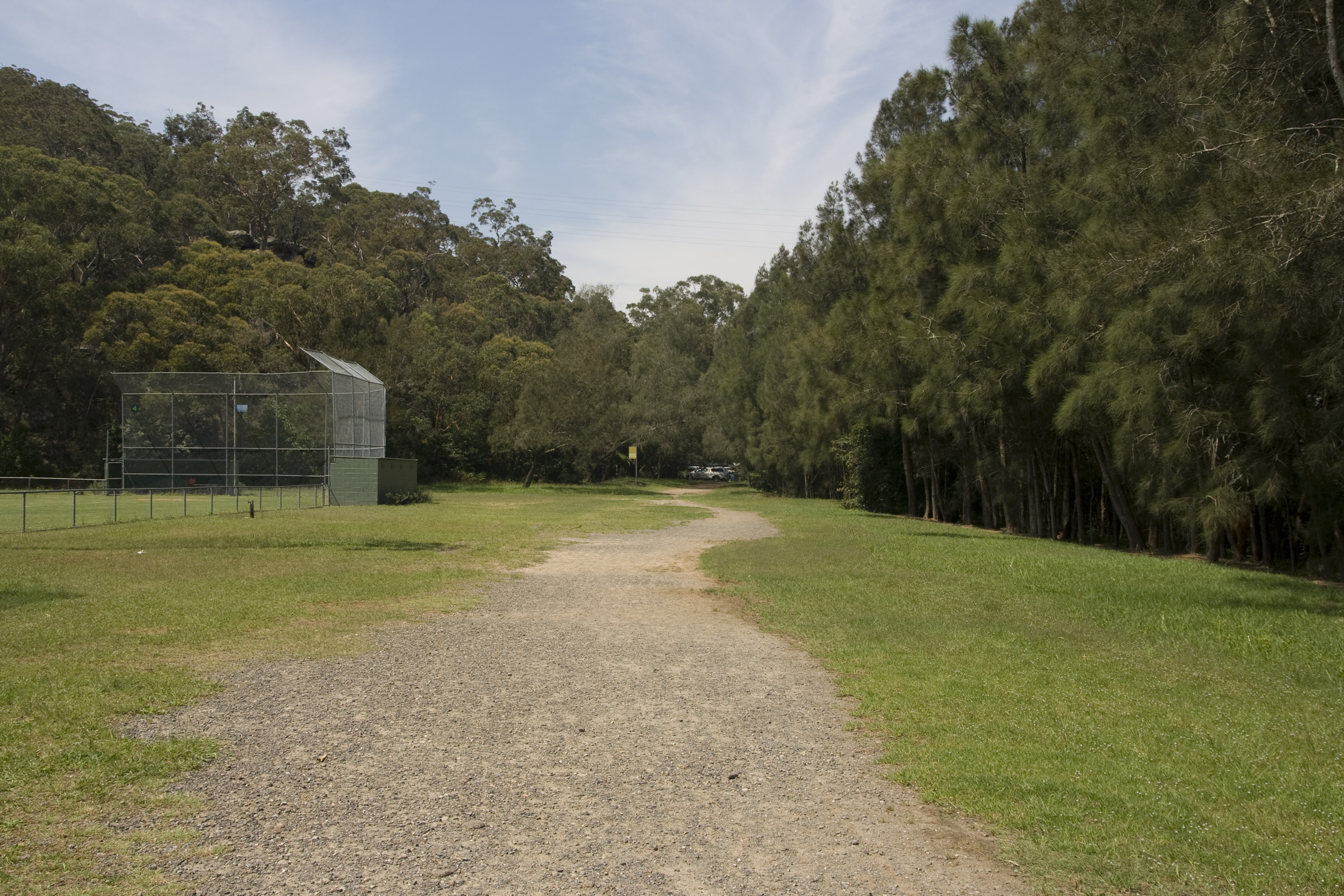
Bonnet Bay NSW 2226, Australia – Panorama #37

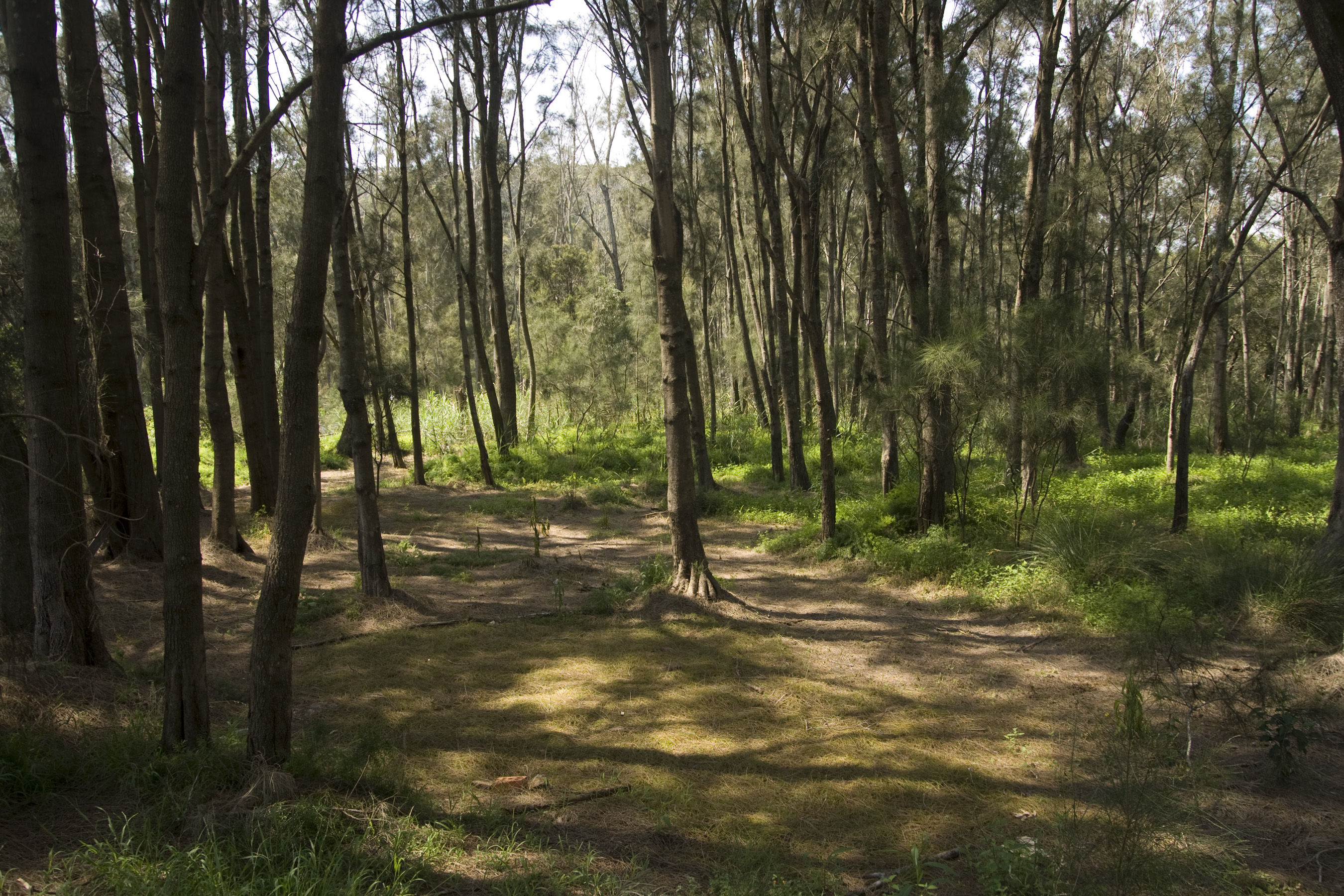
Bonnet Bay NSW 2226, Australia – Panorama #38

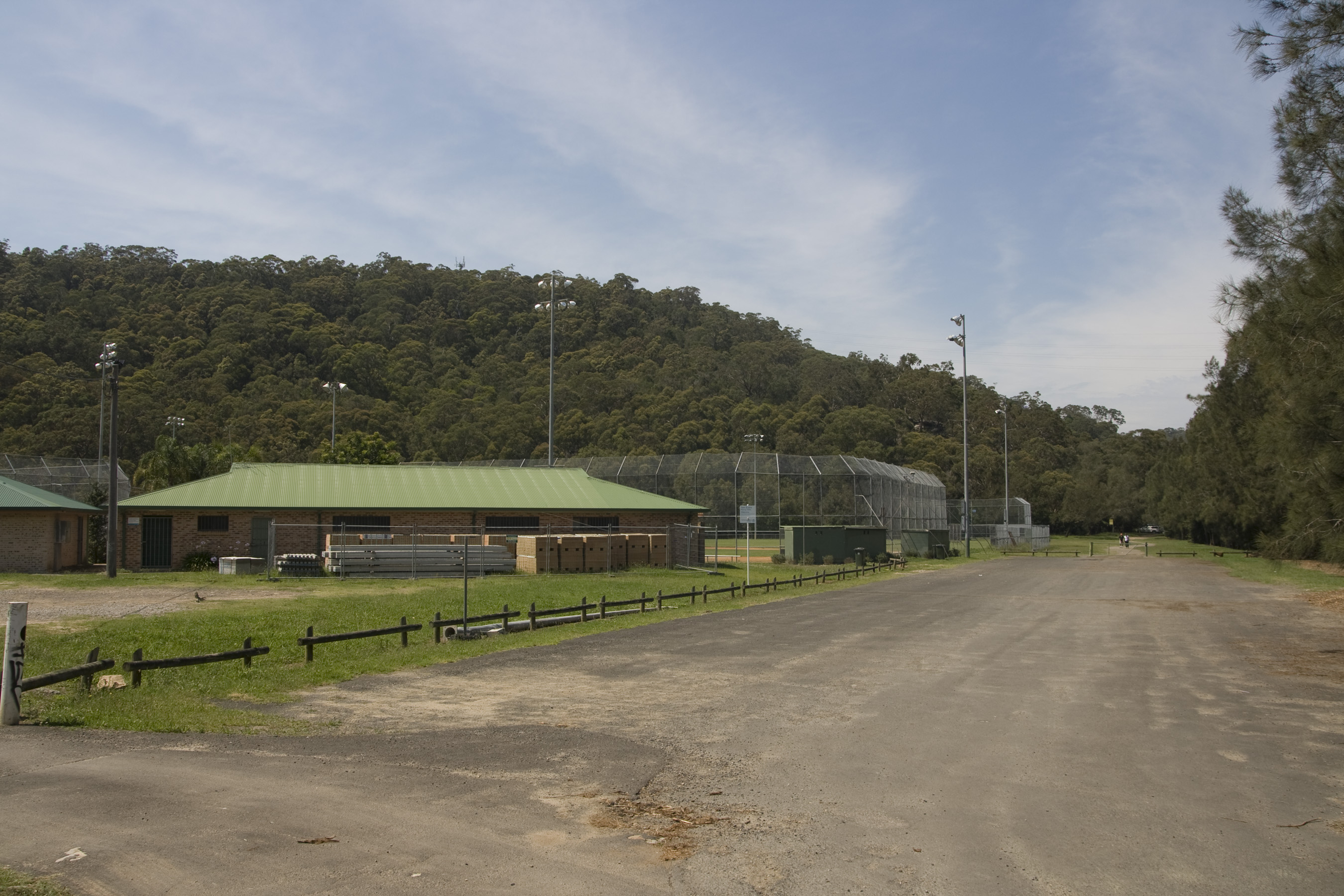
Bonnet Bay NSW 2226, Australia – Panorama #39

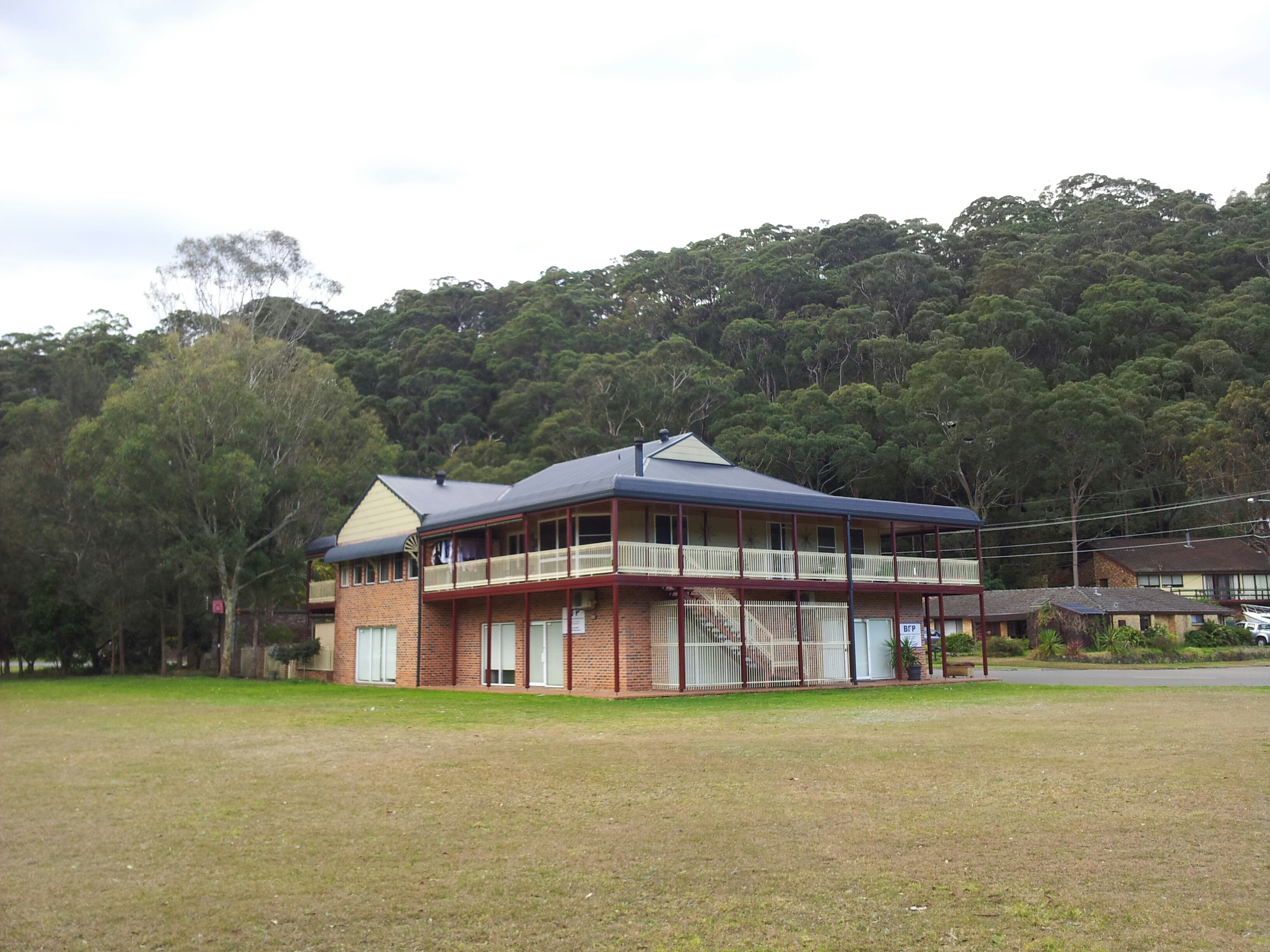
Bonnet Bay NSW 2226, Australia – Panorama #40

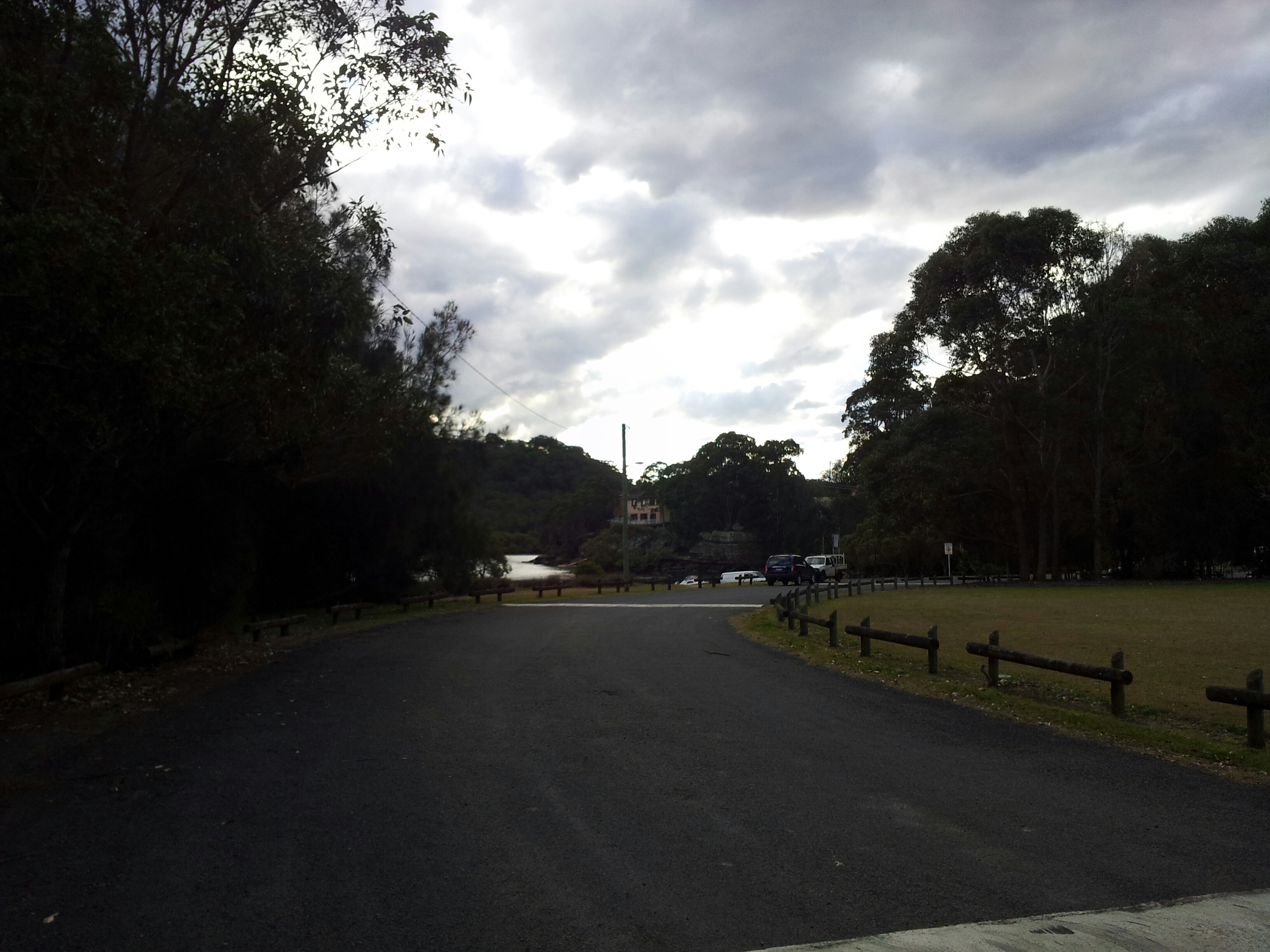
Bonnet Bay NSW 2226, Australia – Panorama #41

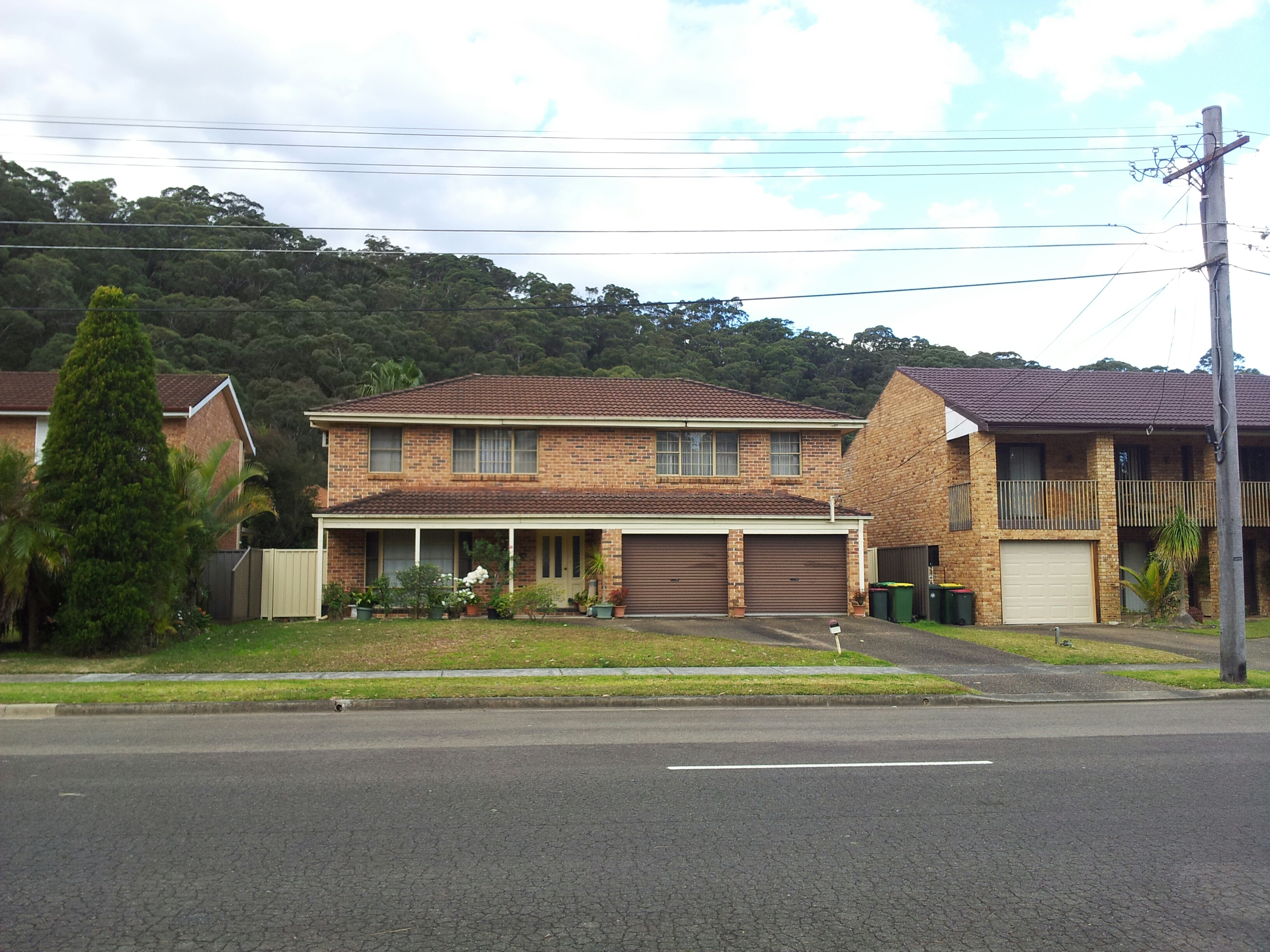
Bonnet Bay NSW 2226, Australia – Panorama #42

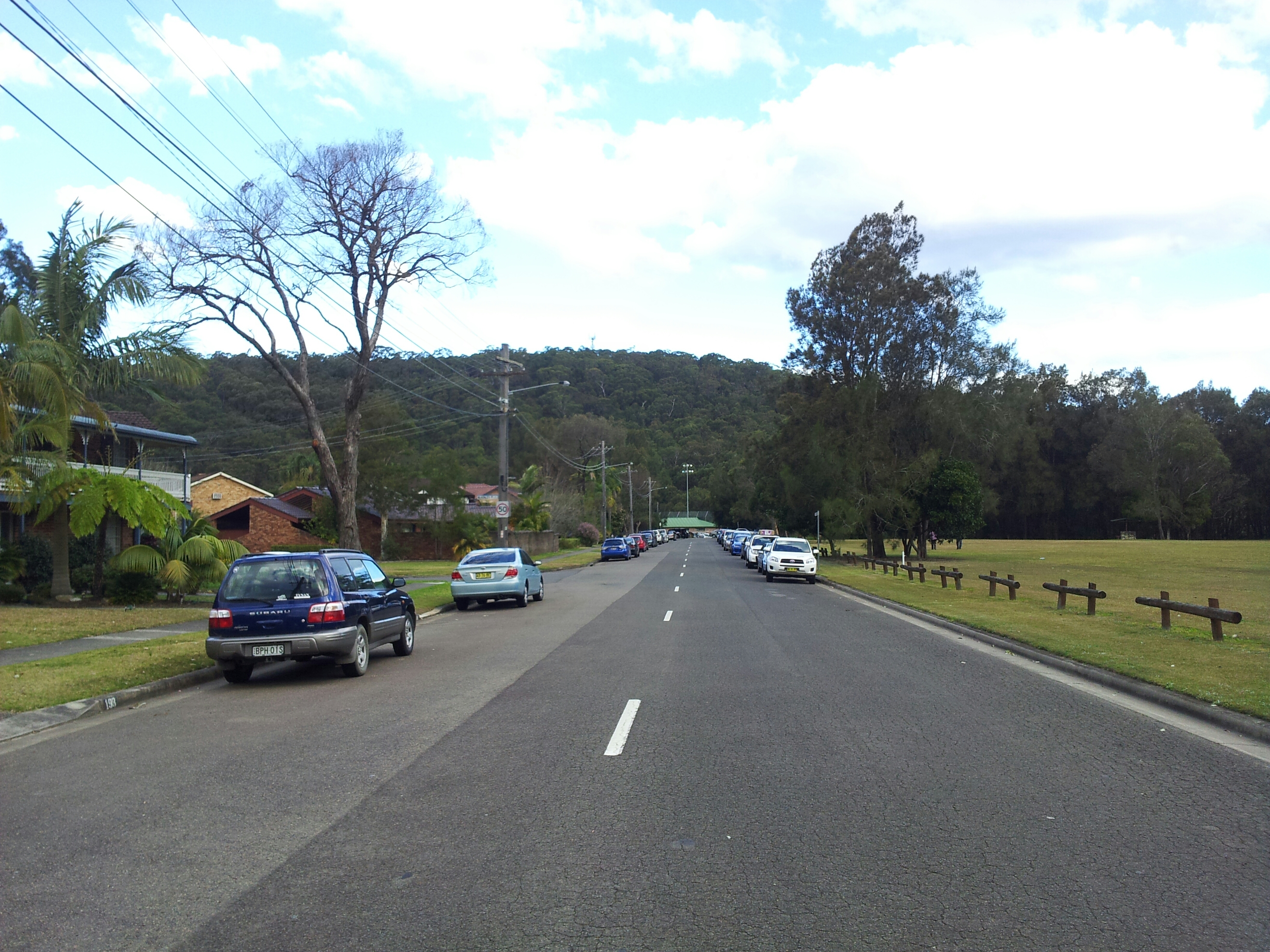
Washington Drive, Bonnet Bay (#7)

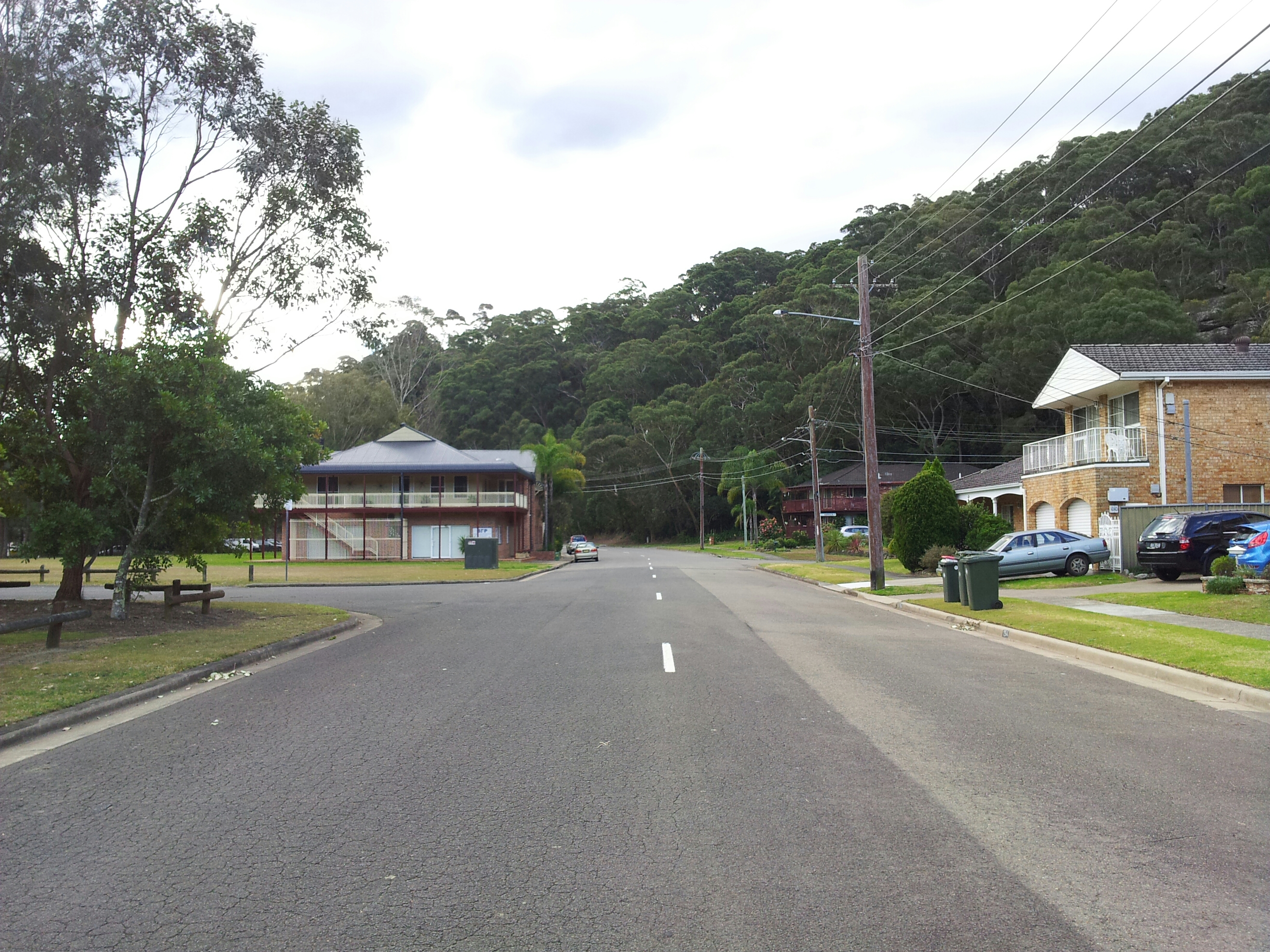
Washington Drive, Bonnet Bay (#8)

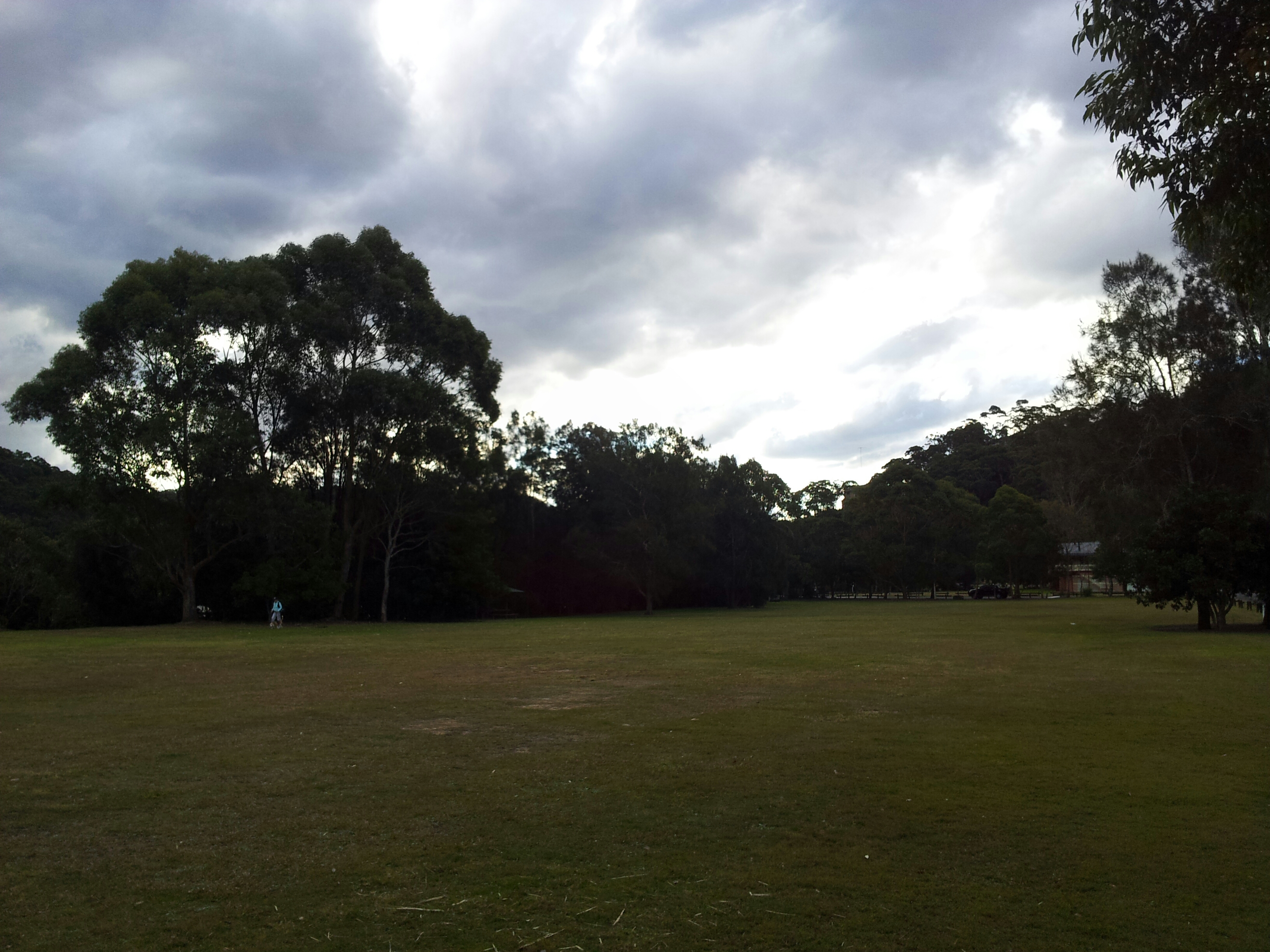
Bonnet Bay NSW 2226, Australia – Panorama #43

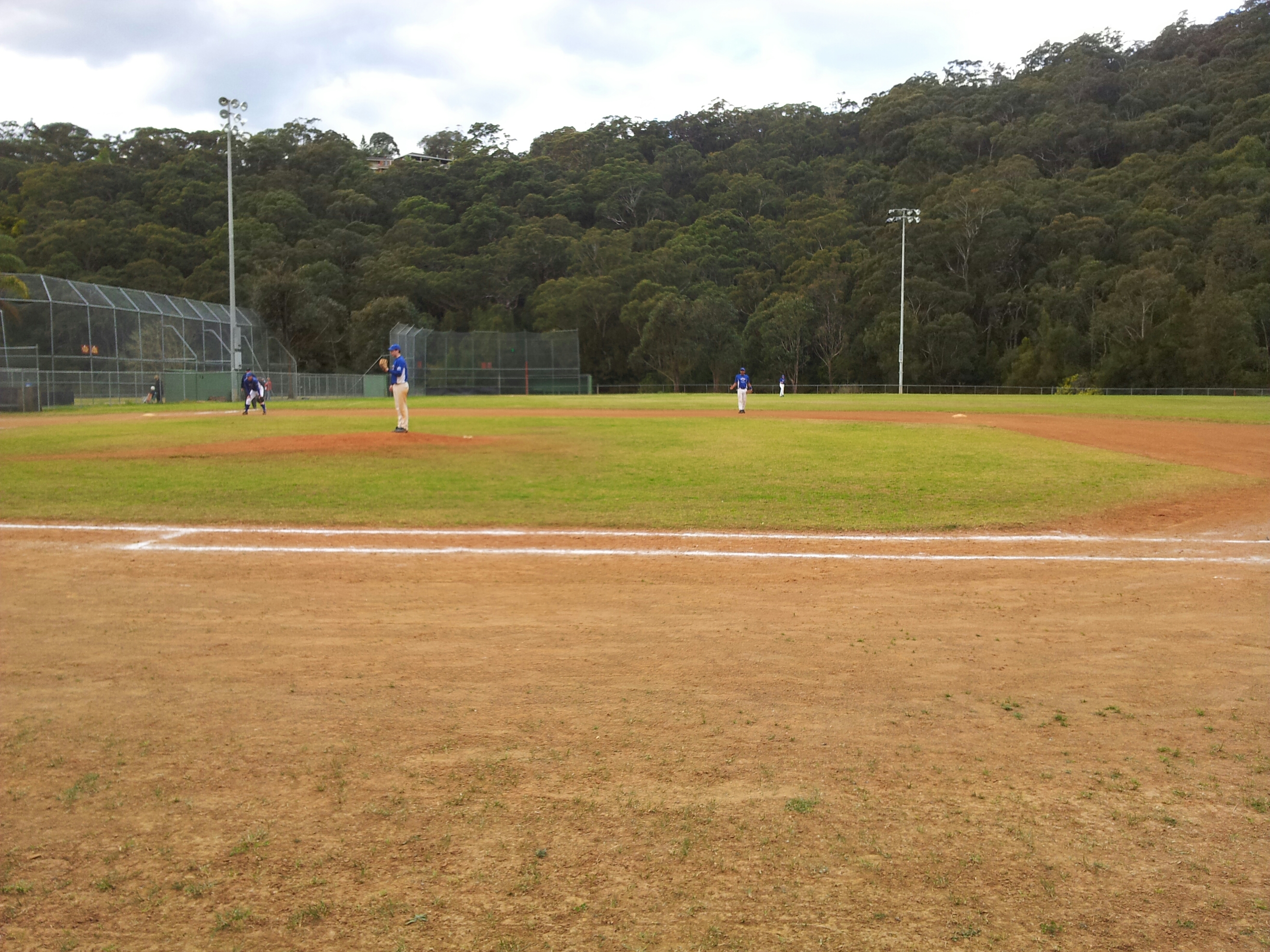
Bonnet Bay NSW 2226, Australia – Panorama #44
