= Daniel Rauicava =

Fijian rugby league footballer

Personal information
- Born: 5 October 1986 (age 40) Canterbury, New South Wales, Australia

Playing information
- Position: Centre, Second-row
Club
Years	Team	Pld	T	G	FG	P
2010	Canterbury-Bankstown	2	0	0	0	0

Daniel Rauicava (born 5 October 1986) is an Australian former professional rugby league footballer who played for the Canterbury-Bankstown Bulldogs in the NRL. His position was at centre. Rauicava made his NRL debut in round 23 against the Canberra Raiders. Rauicava's junior club was the Menai Roosters.
