= SSCS =

SSCS may refer to:

- Sea Shepherd Conservation Society
- Sutherland Shire Christian School
- South Suburban Co-operative Society, a retail co-operative in south London, Surrey and Kent
- State of Slovenes, Croats and Serbs
- Surface-Ship Command System, a naval combat system developed by CAP Scientific
- Service Station Computer Systems, office management software
- Solid-State Circuits Society, a society of the Institute of Electrical and Electronics Engineers
