= Bangor, New South Wales =

Bangor
- Suburb
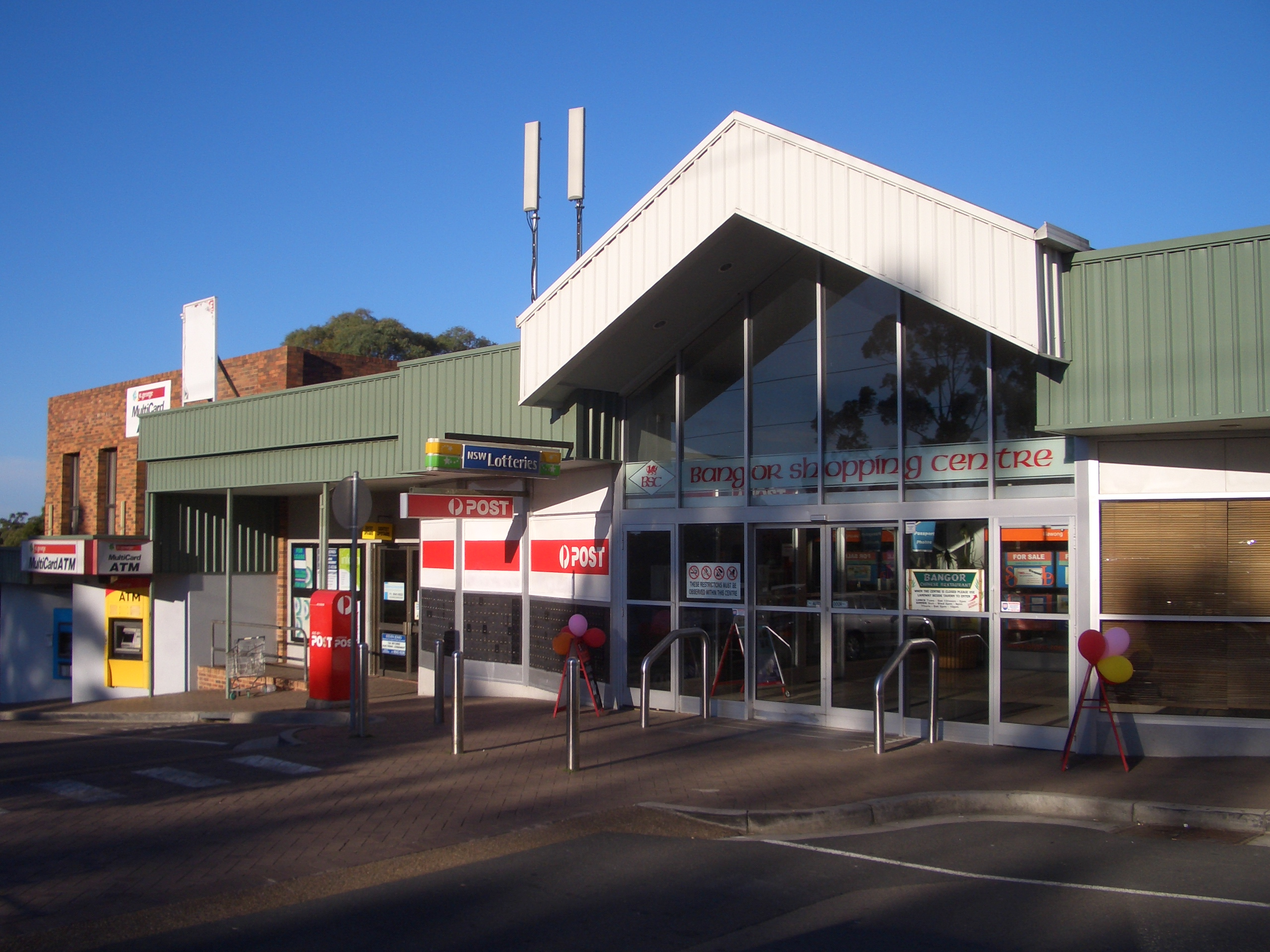
- Bangor Shopping Centre

- Interactive map of Bangor
- Country: Australia
- State: New South Wales
- City: Sydney
- LGA: Sutherland Shire
- Location: 28 km (17 mi) south of Sydney CBD
- Established: 1836

Government
  - State electorates: Holsworthy; Miranda
  - Federal division: Hughes

Area
  - Total: 4.1 km^{2} (1.6 sq mi)
- Elevation: 108 m (354 ft)

Population
  - Total: 5,536 (2021 census)
  - Density: 1,350/km^{2} (3,500/sq mi)
- Postcode: 2234
Suburbs around Bangor
Alfords Point	Illawong	Bonnet Bay
Menai	Bangor	Woronora
Barden Ridge	Woronora Heights	Woronora

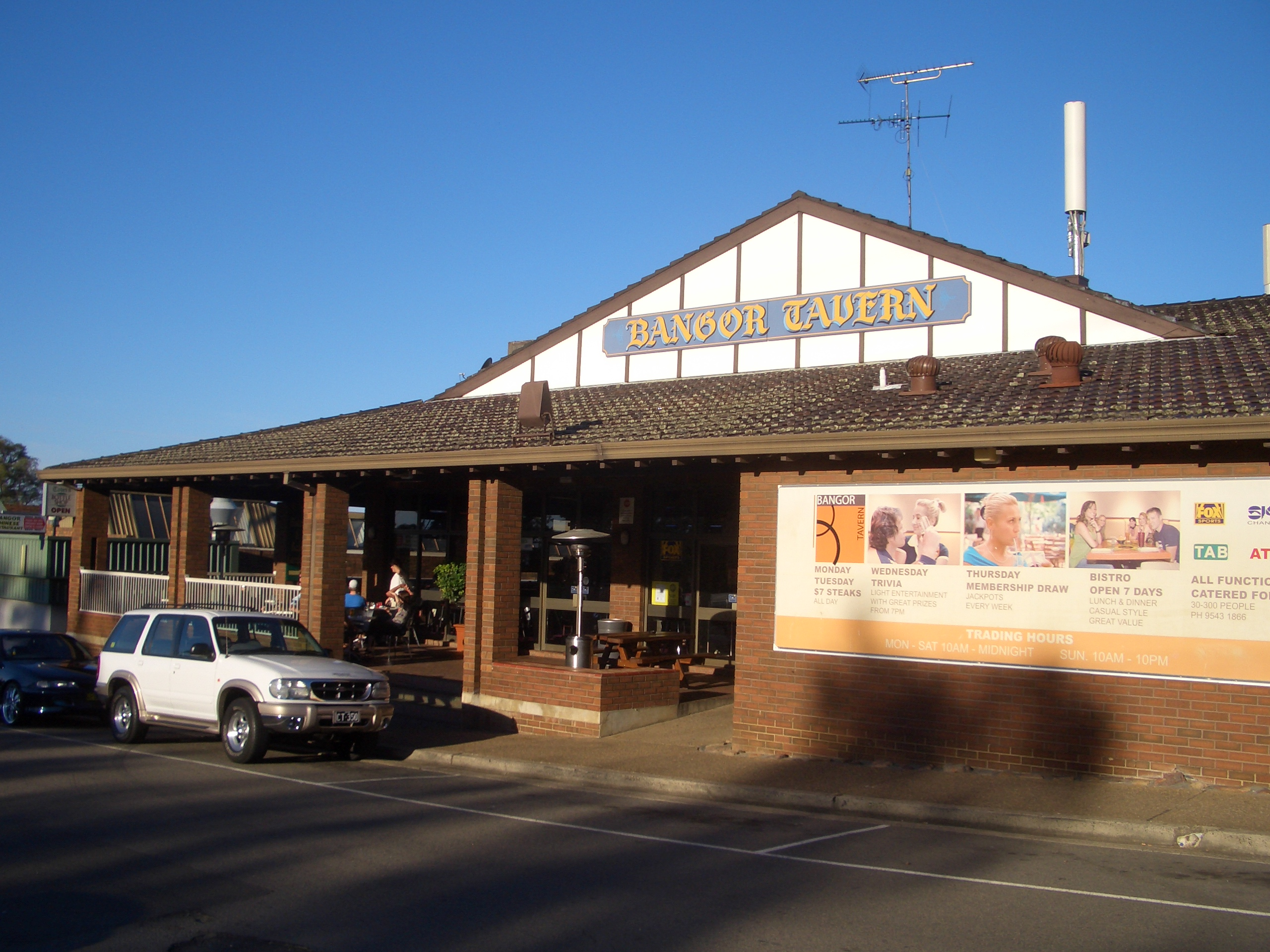
Bangor Tavern, Menai Road

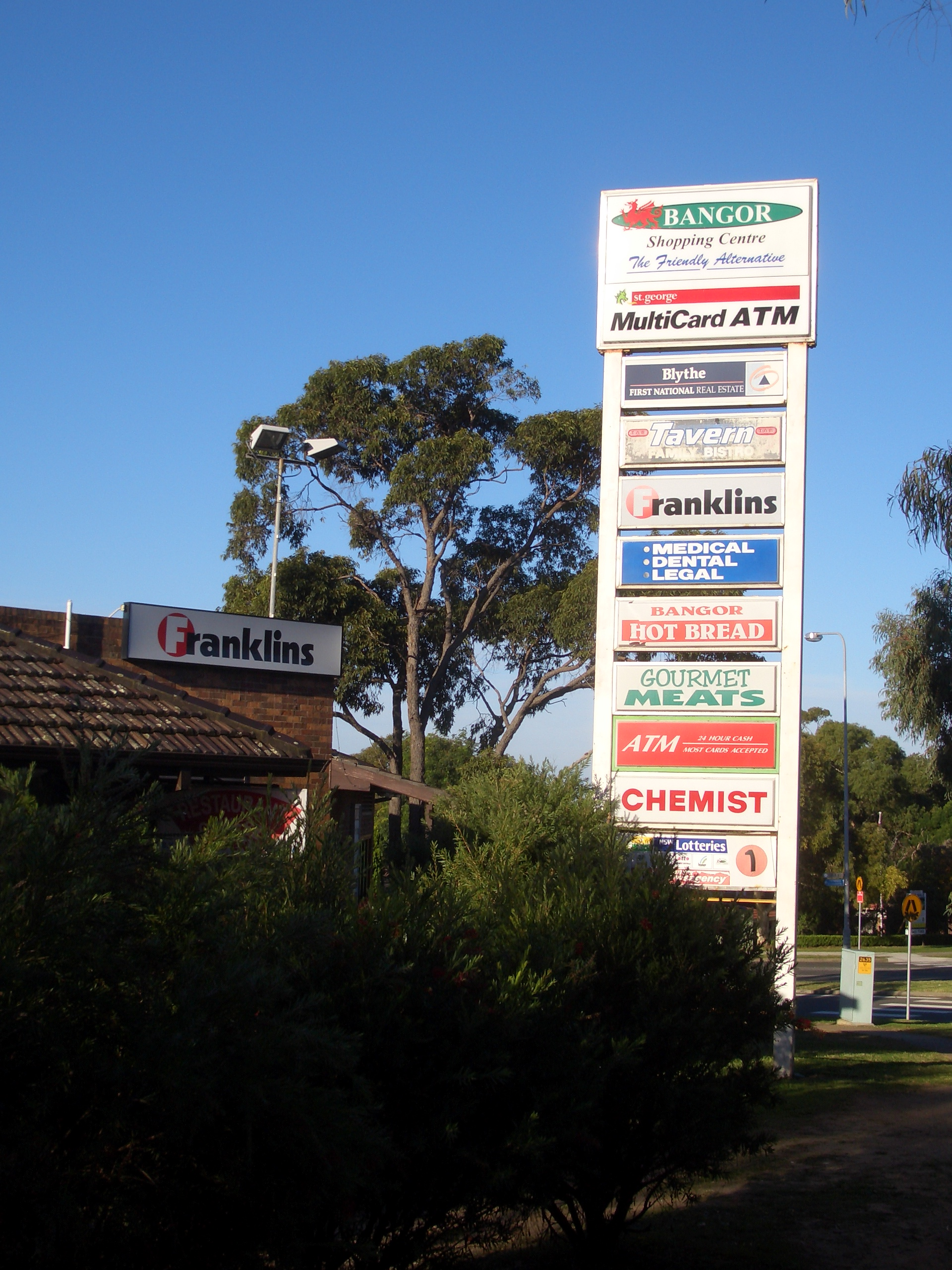
Bangor Shopping Centre, Menai Road

Bangor is a suburb in southern Sydney, in the state of New South Wales, Australia. Bangor is located 28 kilometres south of the Sydney central business district, in the local government area of the Sutherland Shire in the area commonly called Menai. Bangor sits south of the Georges River and to the west of the Woronora River.

== History ==
The name 'Bangor' was selected in 1895 by the land's owner, a farmer named Owen Jones, after his birthplace Bangor in Wales. To avoid confusion with Bangor in Tasmania, the Postmaster General's Office changed the suburb name to Menai in 1910. Another Australian Bangor is located in South Australia. Menai Bridge is a town opposite the original Bangor, on the Menai Strait in Wales. When Menai expanded, the eastern section was renamed Bangor in 1976.

As part of the modern development of Bangor, the streets were all named with an Aboriginal theme.

== Population ==
In the 2021 census, there were 5,536 people in Bangor. 81.5% of people were born in Australia. The next most common country of birth was England at 3.8%. 81.6% of people spoke only English at home. Other languages spoken at home included Greek at 1.9%. The most common responses for religion were Catholic 29.2%, No Religion 26.8% and Anglican 20.2%.

== Commercial area ==
Bangor is a mostly residential suburb with a small suburban shopping centre; In late 2018, the shopping centre commenced renovations.

== Schools ==
- Bangor Public School: Kindergarten to Year 6
- Inaburra School: Kindergarten to Year 12

== Churches ==
- Menai Salvation Army
- Menai Baptist Church (meeting in Inaburra School)

== Transport ==
The main road running through Bangor and Menai is Menai Road. The Bangor Bypass was completed in February 2005 to alleviate traffic in the area.

U-Go Mobility buses (routes 961 and 962) connect Bangor to Menai, Illawong, Alfords Point, Barden Ridge, Padstow, Bankstown, Sutherland, Kirrawee, Gymea and Miranda. Metrobus M92 runs between Sutherland and Parramatta via Bankstown. It also runs a weekend bus service to Cronulla.

The closest train station is Sutherland, on the T4 Eastern Suburbs & Illawarra line; although Padstow on the T8 Airport & South line is also frequently used. U-Go Mobility buses service Bangor from both these train stations.

A family friendly cycle way runs from Sutherland to Padstow through Bangor, which links up with the broader Sydney cycle way.

== Sport and recreation ==
Bangor has tennis courts at Pyree Street and Yala Road. Yala Road sporting facilities also include netball courts. Bangor also has two sporting ovals (Akuna Oval and Billa Oval) named after the roads they are situated on. Bangor is home to the Bangor Brumbies soccer club and its home field is Billa Oval. The Menai Roosters football team uses Akuna Oval as its home oval, as well as the 'Comets' Bangor-Barden Ridge Cricket Club. The Bangor Tigers Junior AFL team uses fields at Barden Ridge oval as its home ground. The Bangor Scout Group was established in 1986 with a Scout Hall in Ross Reserve in Pyree Street and caters for youth aged from 6 to 26 years old.

The nearby Woronora and Georges rivers and extensive bush areas are popular with the locals and offer a variety of outdoor activities including bush walking, rock climbing/bouldering, mountain bike riding, boating, canoeing, kayaking, rowing and fishing.

A Little Fins Swim School Bangor, a small commercial swimming pool operates from the Bangor Shopping Centre. A larger council run swimming complex and leisure centre operates at Sutherland.

Children's playgrounds exist at:

- Akuna Reserve
- Billa Oval
- Jelba Reserve
- Kodala Way
- Ross Reserve

== Gallery ==
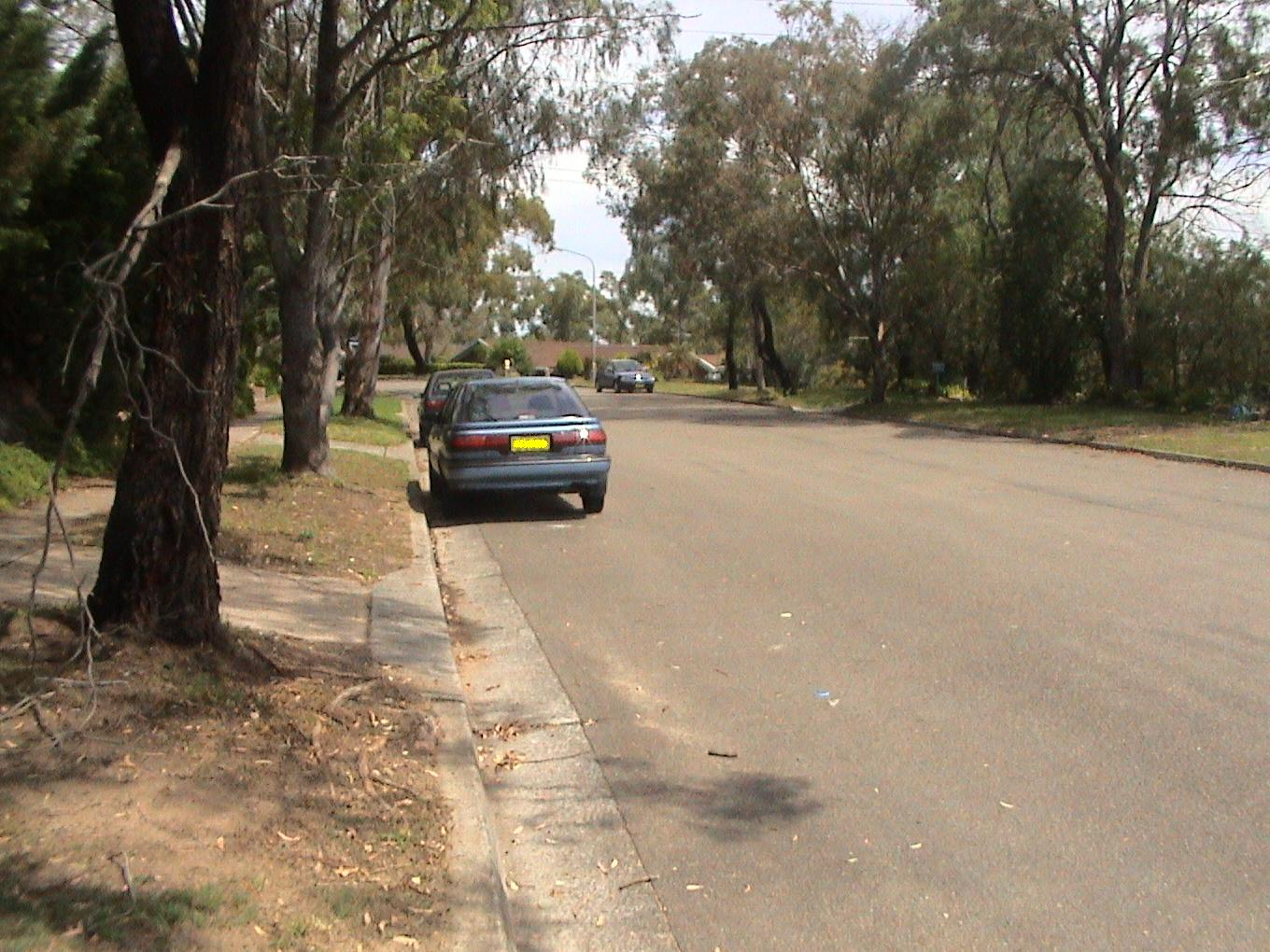
Yates Road at Bangor

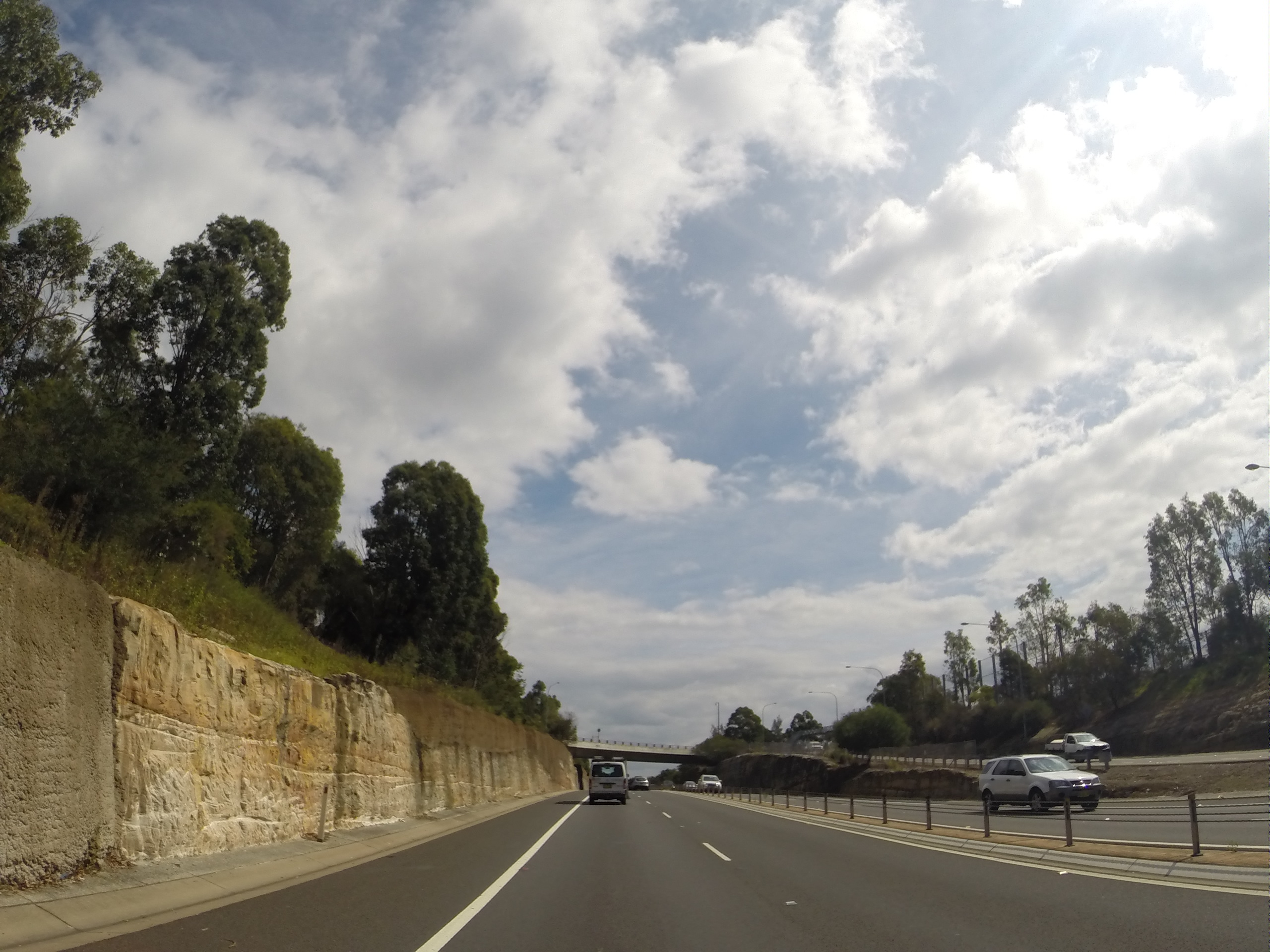
Bangor NSW 2234, Australia – Panorama #1

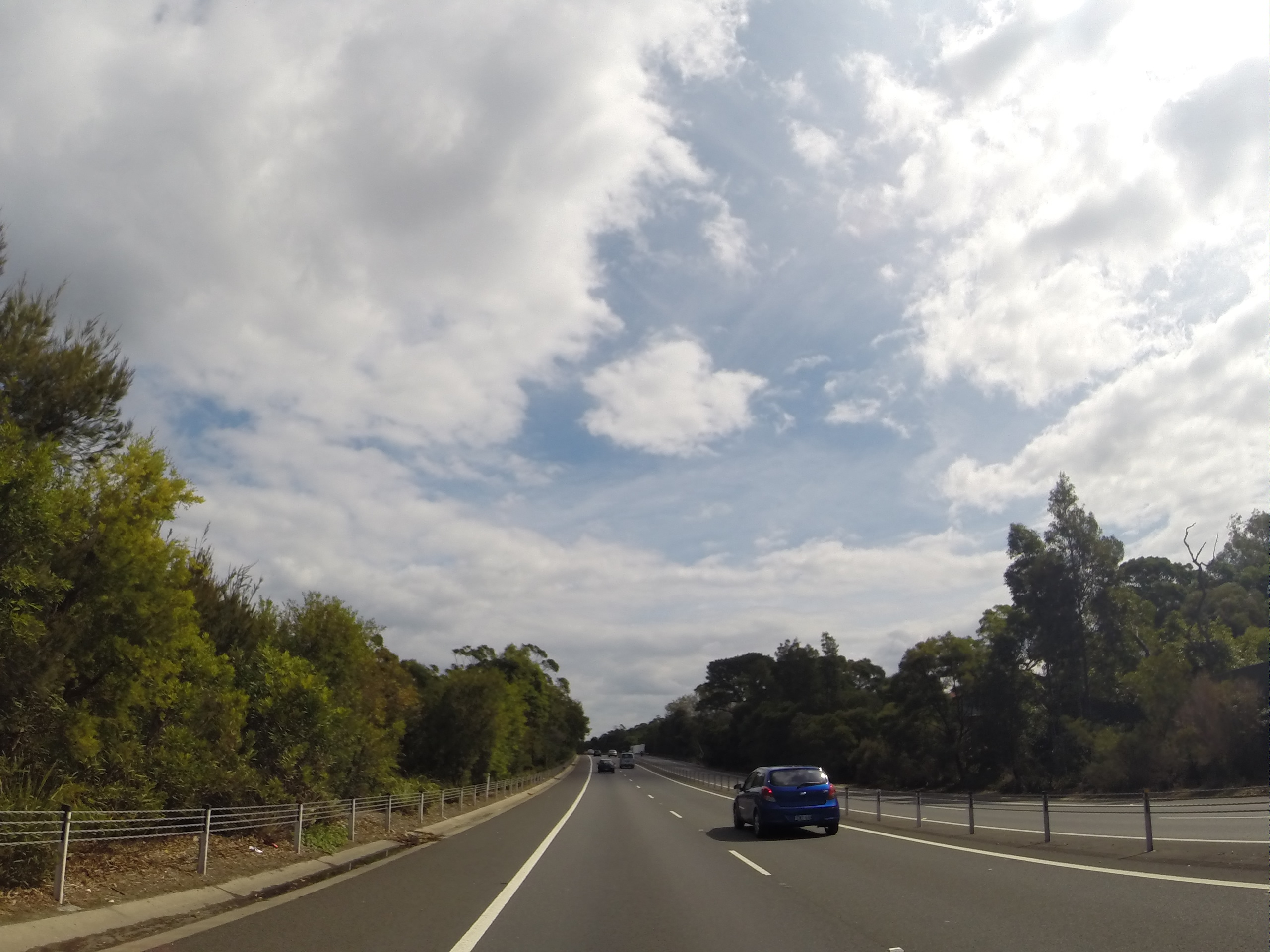
Bangor NSW 2234, Australia – Panorama #2

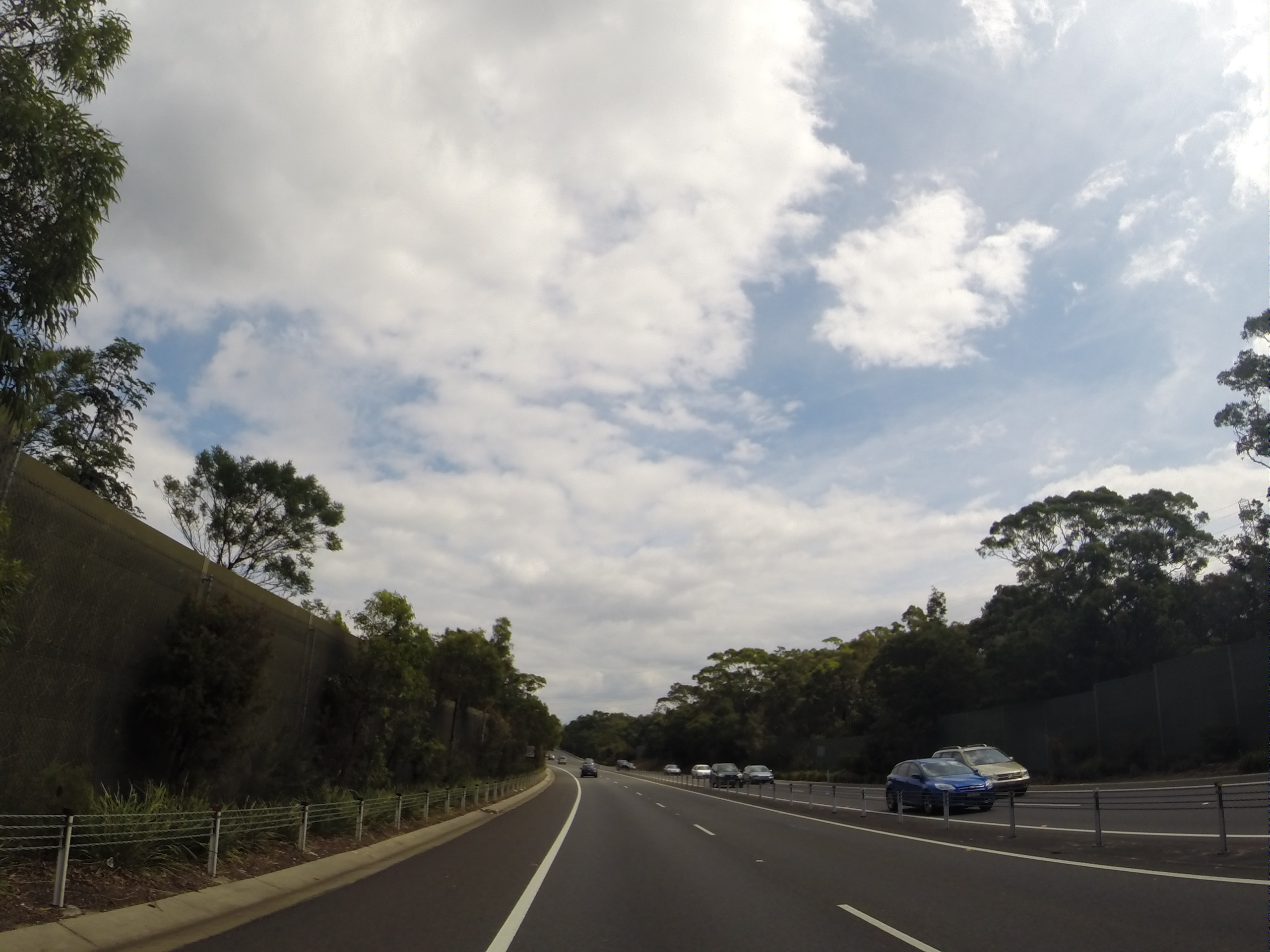
Bangor NSW 2234, Australia – Panorama #3

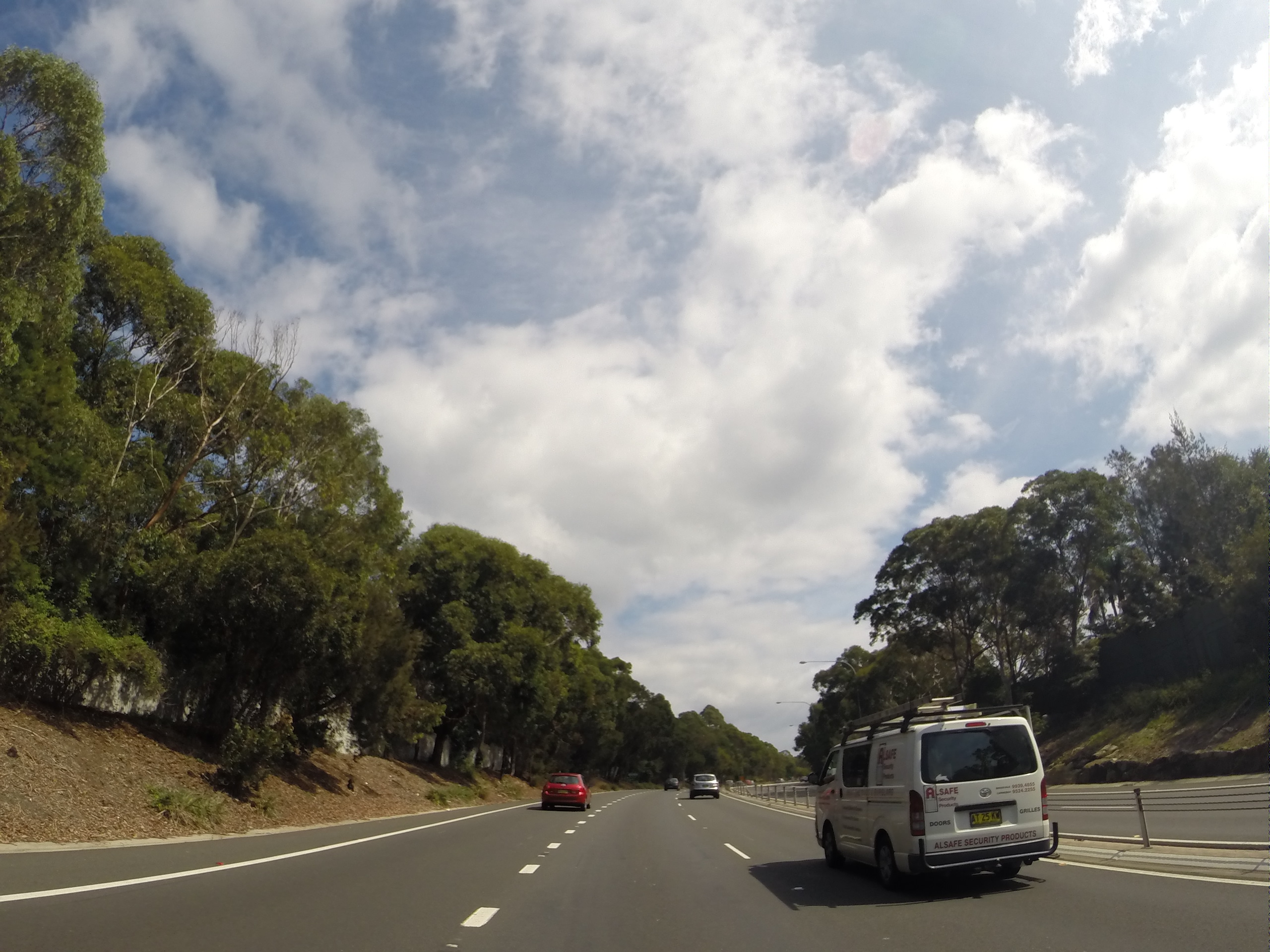
Bangor NSW 2234, Australia – Panorama #4

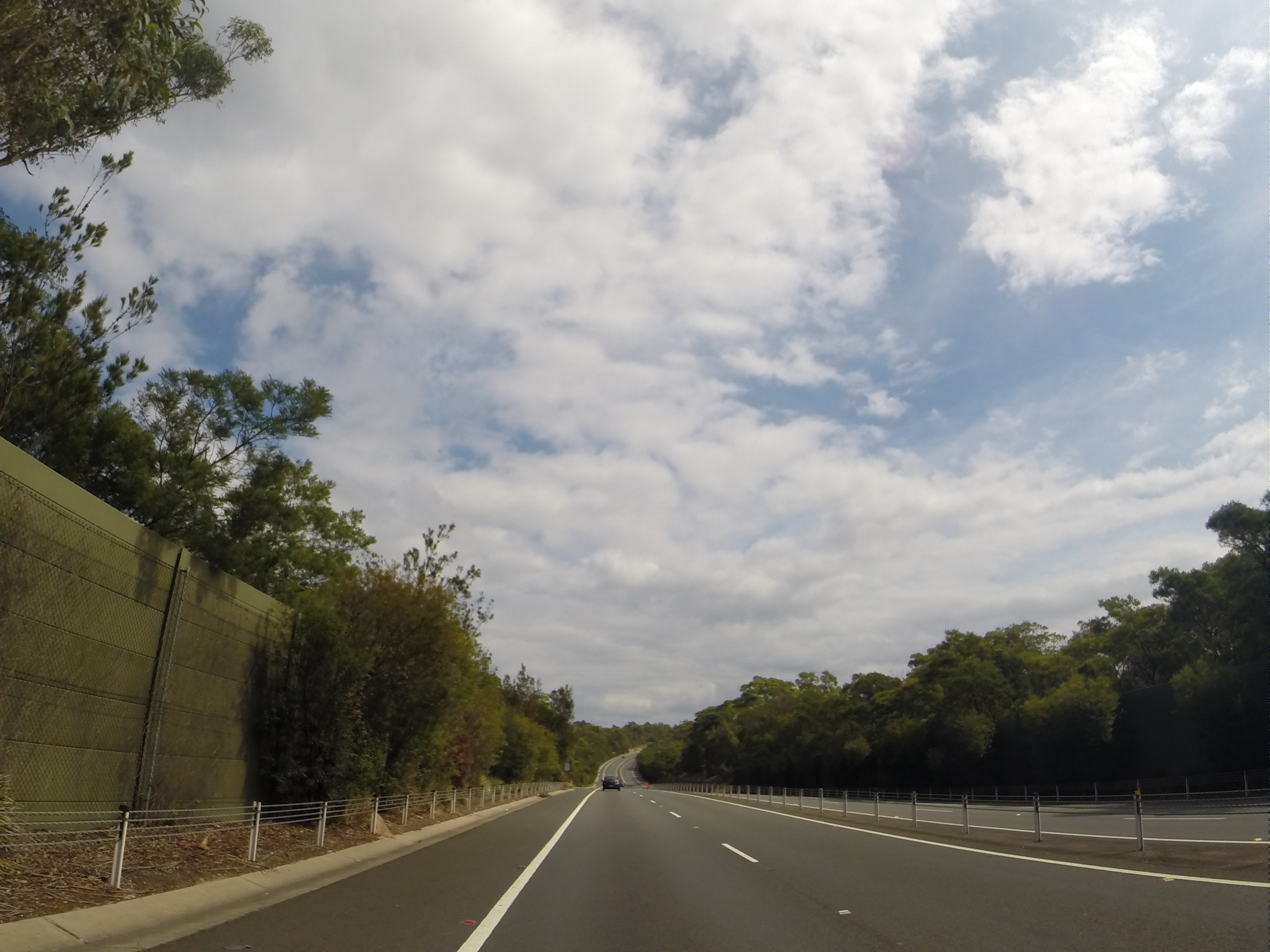
Bangor NSW 2234, Australia – Panorama #5

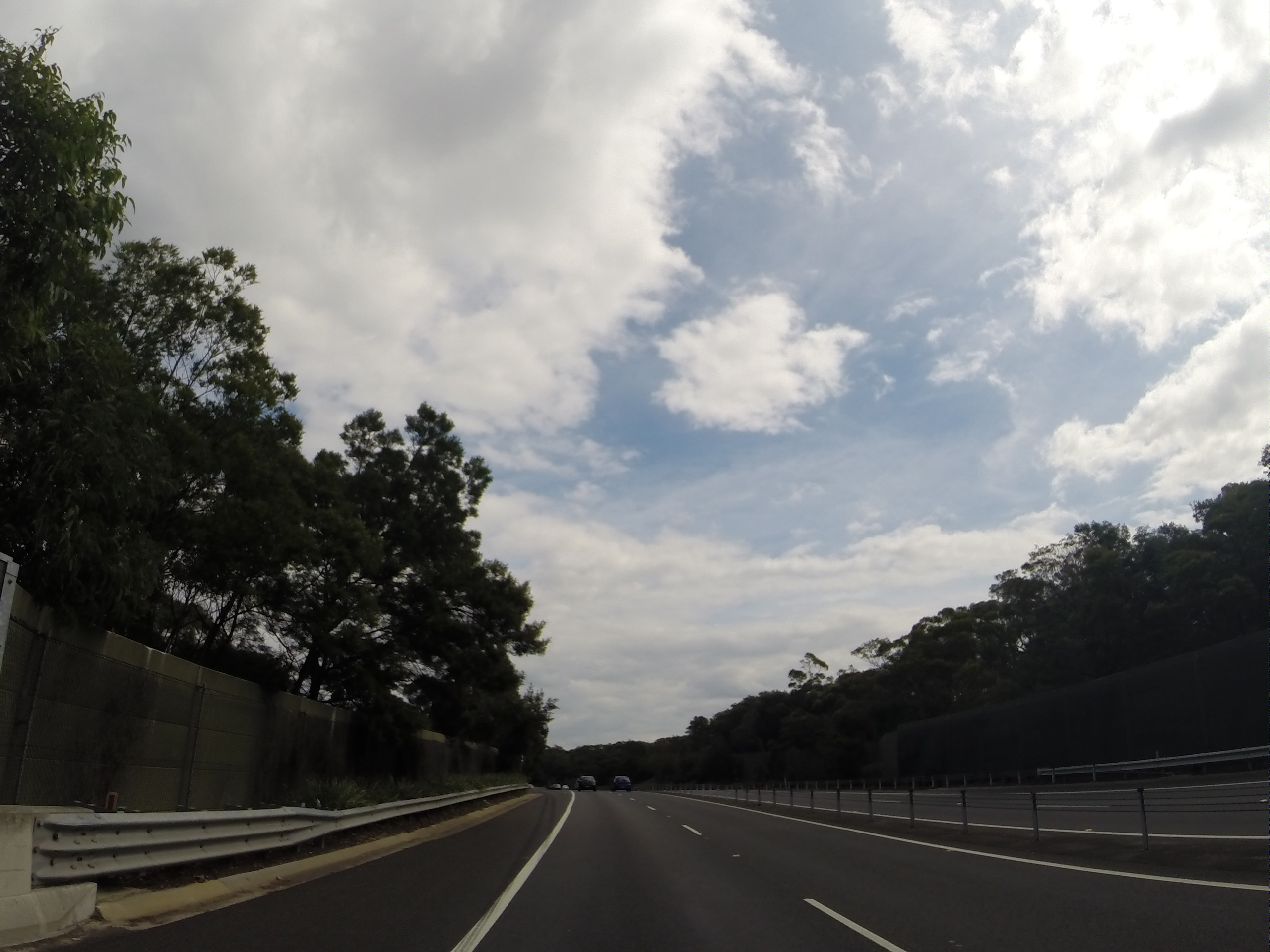
Bangor NSW 2234, Australia – Panorama #6

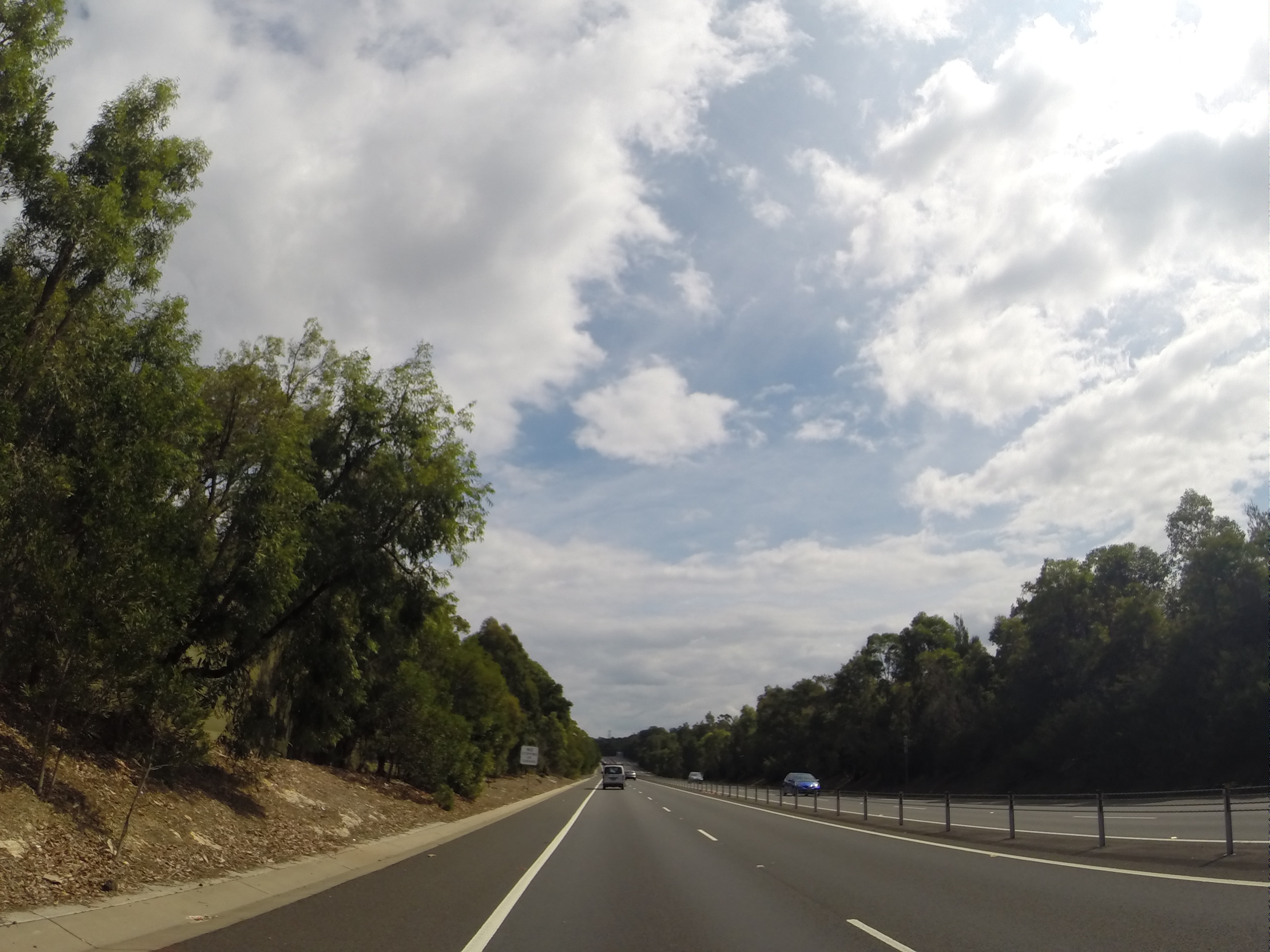
Bangor NSW 2234, Australia – Panorama #7

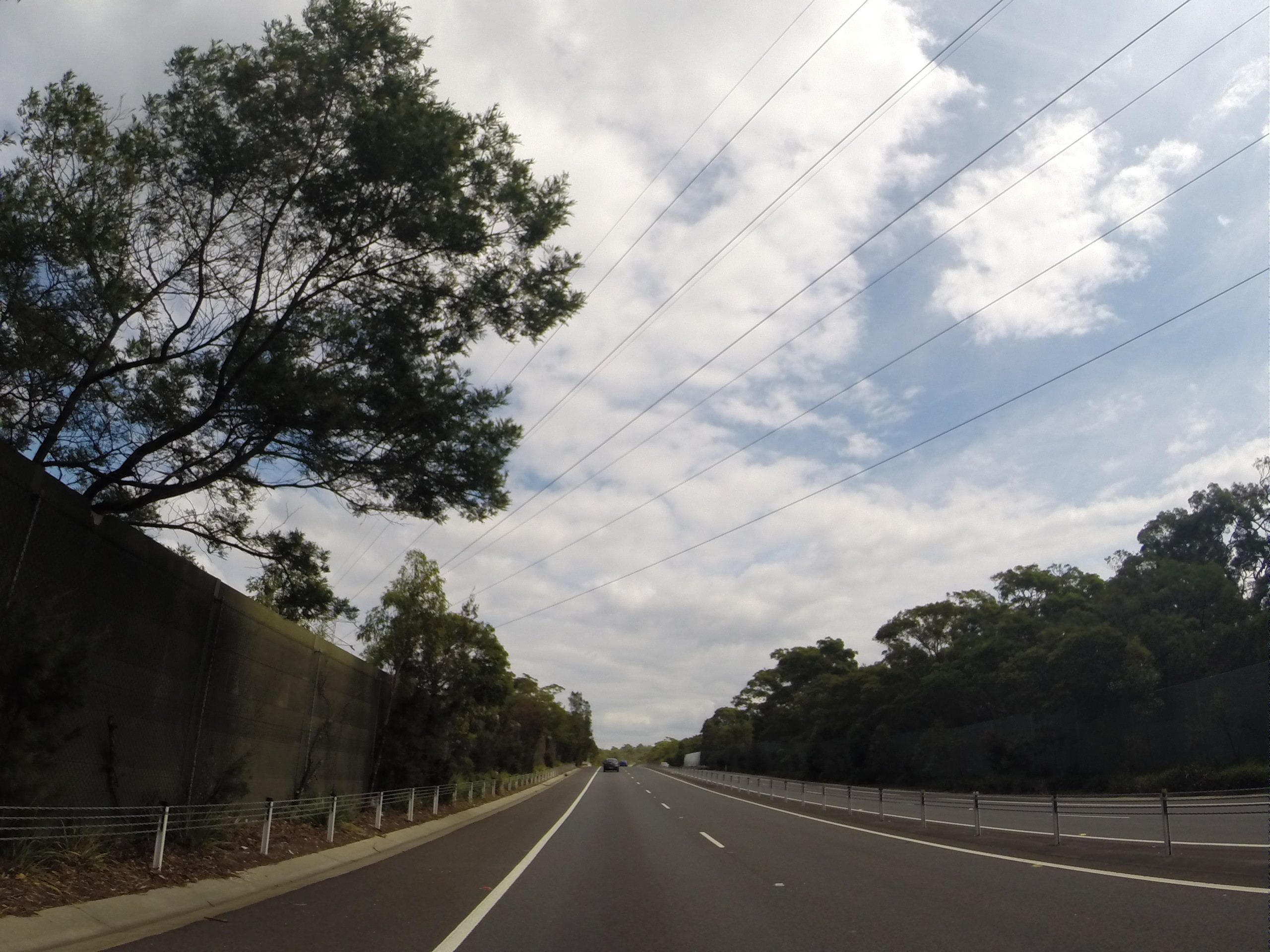
Bangor NSW 2234, Australia – Panorama #8

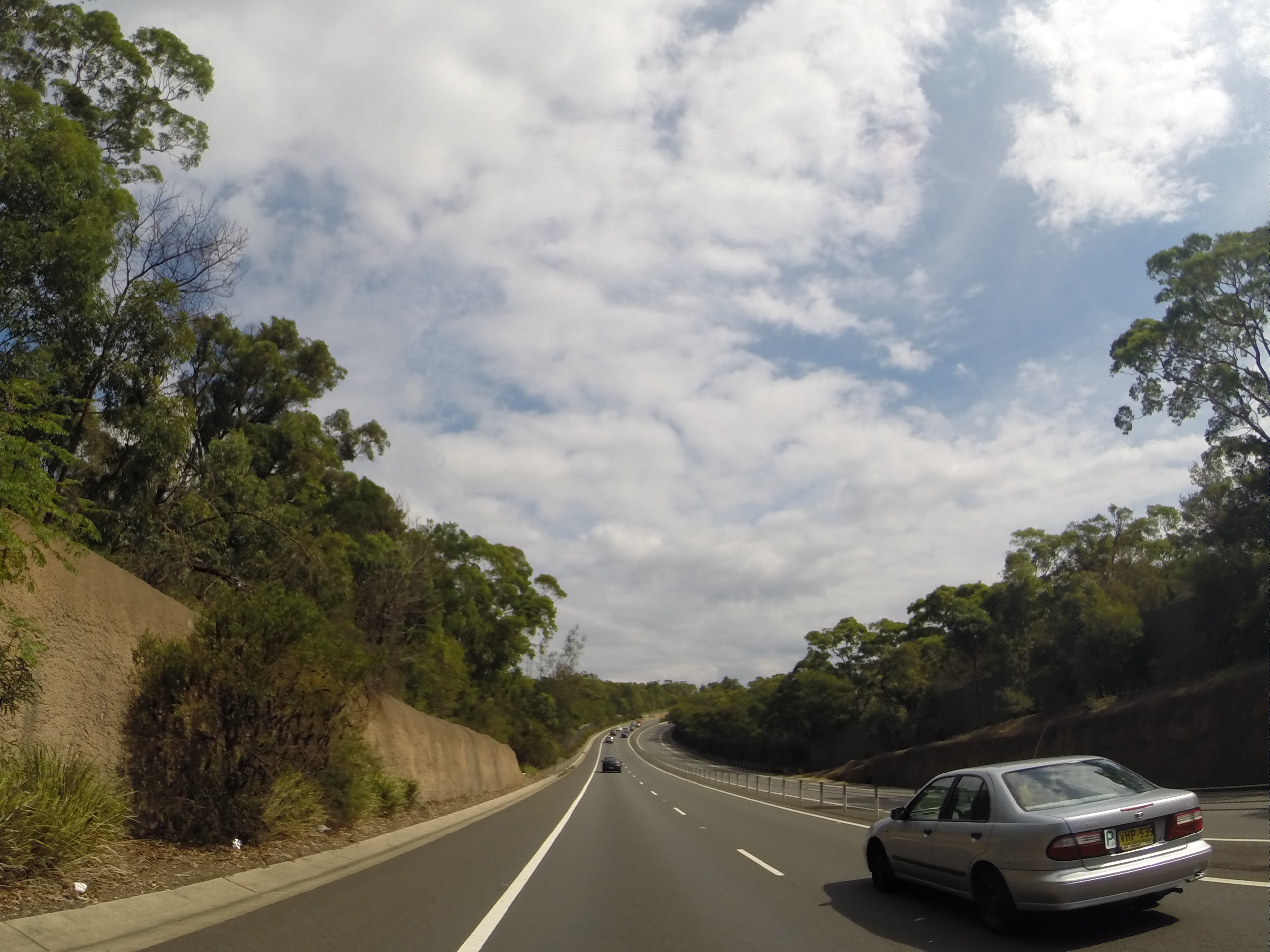
Bangor NSW 2234, Australia – Panorama #9
