= St. George Call =

The St. George Call, front page, 9 January 1904

The St. George Call was a weekly English language newspaper published from 1904 to 1979 in the St. George and Woronora electorates of New South Wales, Australia.

== History ==
The first issue of The St. George Call was published on Saturday, 9 January 1904. The initial cost of a weekly issue was one penny.

The first editorial on page 4 of the paper acknowledged the growing need within the local community for "...a representative local organ... so often expressed, and so generally felt...". The hitherto lack of representation of the area in print was cited in the editorial with the community described as "...of insufficient importance for the city press." Promising to comment without favour on local issues, the paper's editors aimed to "...criticise boldly whatever we consider amiss in the public affairs of our steadily progressing district".

The publication ceased on 25 October 1979.

== Digitisation ==
Issues of The St. George Call from 1904 to 1957 have been digitised as part of the Australian Newspaper Digitisation Program of the National Library of Australia.

== See also ==
- List of newspapers in New South Wales
