= Menai Roosters =

Australian rugby league club, based in Bangor, NSW

Club information
- Full name: Menai Roosters Rugby League Football Club

Current details
- Ground: Akuna Oval
- CEO: Steve Cooper
- Secretary: Sonia Cooper
- Competition: CSDRFL
- 2015 A-Grade Reserve: 1st

The Menai Roosters Rugby League Football Club (also known as Menai District) is a rugby league football club that was formed in 1981 and competes in the Cronulla-Sutherland District Rugby Football League. The club is based out of Akuna Oval at Bangor where its clubhouse and headquarters are located and usually draws the large majority of its junior players from Menai and the surrounding suburbs of Bangor, Illawong, Alfords Point and Barden Ridge.

The Menai club currently field teams from Under 6 age groups all the way up to A Grade.

== Notable players ==
| Player | Professional club(s) |
|---|---|
| Cameron Ciraldo | Cronulla / Newcastle Knights / Penrith Panthers / Italy |
| Brent Grose | Cronulla / Warrington |
| Luke Milton | Sydney Roosters / NSW Waratahs / Australia national rugby sevens team / New York Rugby Club |
