= Stanwell Creek railway viaduct =

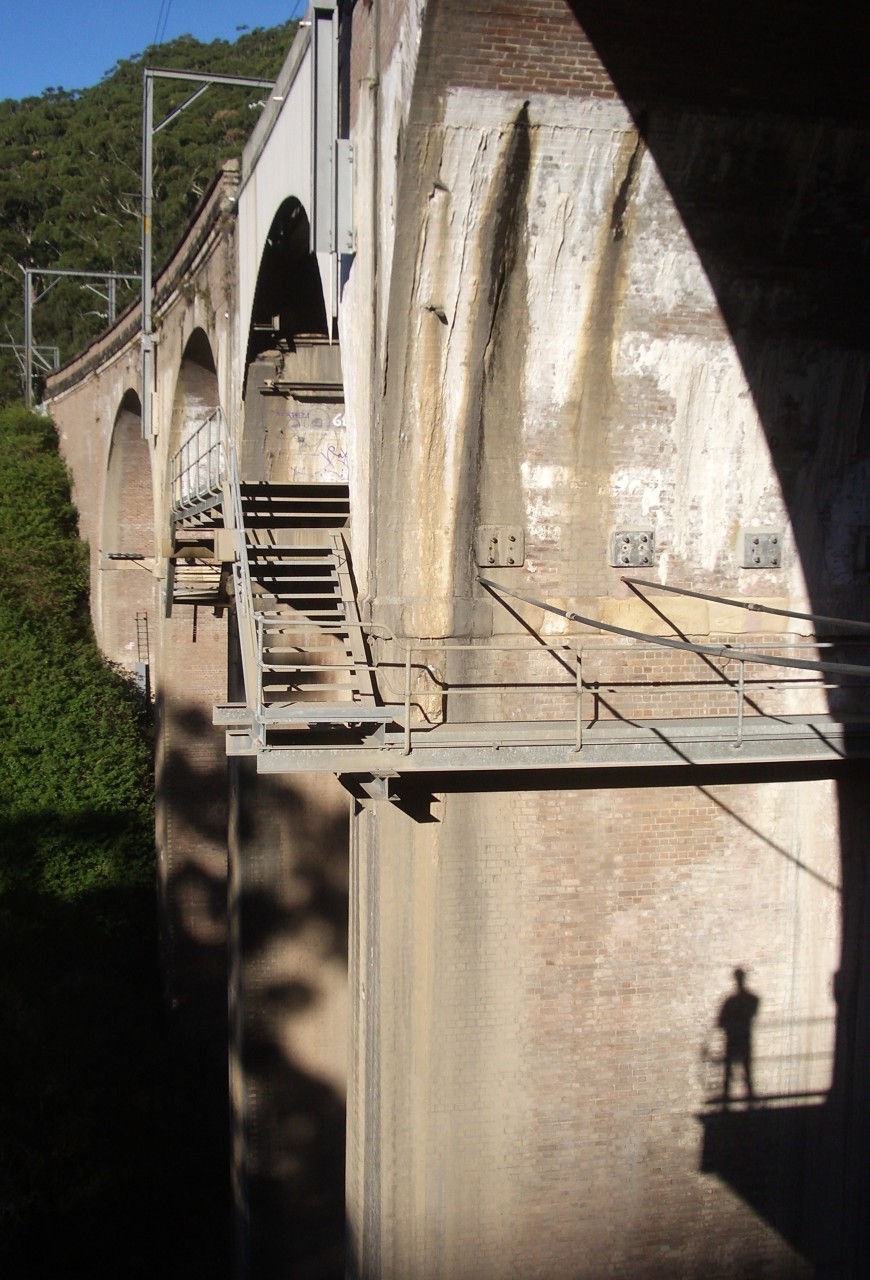
- Stanwell Creek railway viaduct, in 2006
- Coordinates: 34°13′49″S 150°58′26″E
- Carries: Illawarra line
- Crosses: Stanwell Creek
- Locale: Stanwell Park, City of Wollongong, New South Wales, Australia
- Owner: Transport Asset Manager of New South Wales

Characteristics
- Design: Arch viaduct
- Material: Brick
- Longest span: 13.1 metres (43 ft)
- No. of spans: 8
- Clearance below: 110 feet (34 m)

Rail characteristics
- No. of tracks: Two
- Track gauge: 4 ft 8 1/2 in (1,435 mm) standard gauge

History
- Engineering design by: NSW Government Railways
- Construction start: 1918
- Construction end: 1920

New South Wales Heritage Register
- Official name: Stanwell Park Rail Viaduct over Stanwell Creek; Stanwell Creek Viaduct
- Type: State heritage (built)
- Designated: 2 April 1999
- Reference no.: 1054
- Type: Railway Bridge/Viaduct
- Category: Transport – Rail
- Builders: Day labour

Location
- Interactive map of Stanwell Creek railway viaduct

The Stanwell Creek railway viaduct is a heritage-listed railway bridge on the Illawarra railway line at Stanwell Park, City of Wollongong, New South Wales, Australia. It was designed by the New South Wales Government Railways and built in 1920 by day labour. The property is owned by Transport Asset Manager of New South Wales, an agency of the Government of New South Wales. It was added to the New South Wales State Heritage Register on 2 April 1999.

== History ==
The original Illawarra Railway of the 1880s had a difficult transition from the high country near the top of the Illawarra escarpment down to the coastal plain north of Wollongong. It involved steep grades and eight tunnels between Waterfall and Scarborough. The worst was the "suffocating" Otford railway tunnel, the steepest and longest, which emerged into the lower levels of the Stanwell Park amphitheatre.

Plans began around 1910 for duplicating the line with deviations to ease grades and to bypass the old single line tunnels. The section from Waterfall to Helensburgh was completed in 1914, then to Otford in 1915 and on to Coalcliff in 1920. The last section stayed much higher up in the Stanwell Park amphitheatre hence its crossing high above Stanwell Creek.

Plans for the tall, double track, brick arch viaduct were ready in 1917 and work began the next year. It was a remarkable effort to complete this major structure in a little over two years.

Brick arches were the automatic choice because steel was unavailable due to World War I and the State Brickworks at Homebush was in full production. It was still part of the "brick arch era" 1910-24.

It has been estimated that the total number of bricks used in the massive tall piers, the tallest 34 metres (110 ft) high, and the eight arches was around three million, enough to build about 150 brick houses.

The viaduct remained in good condition until 1985 when the arches were found to be on the verge of collapse, at which time remedial work was undertaken.

== Description ==
Located 56.727 kilometres (35.249 mi) from Central station, the bridge consists of a curved brick arch viaduct consisting of eight 13.1-metre (43 ft) clear spans on tall brick piers.

It was reported to currently be in a stable condition as at 17 March 2006.

Major modifications (mainly internal) and the loss of arch span 6, all necessary to save the structure from collapse, have compromised the integrity of the viaduct. However, if long term stability is confirmed, the Rail Authority may consider rebuilding arch span 6.

=== Modifications and dates ===
In late 1985, some of the brick arches were on the verge of collapse caused by ground movements associated with the Escarpment and coal mining. The problem was arrested but span 6 was demolished and replaced by a "floating" steel girder so the remaining two parts of the brick arch viaduct could be monitored and plans made for repairs.

In 1992 repairs began under single-line working. The closed track was taken up and all material on top of the arches removed then replaced by concrete with embedded layers of reinforcing mesh. Arch action was essentially eliminated.

The track was replaced on a waterproof base and the process repeated for the other track. Work was completed in October 1993 but the steel girder in span 6 remains while long-term monitoring continues.

== Heritage listing ==
This viaduct can be seen as an impressive bridge structures in Australia. Its significance to New South Wales is due to it being an item of infrastructure for the historically important duplication of the Illawarra Railway. It was an achievement of the "brick arch era" 1910-24 of railway construction in New South Wales. It is the only one of its type and scale in Australia and retains its significance even though emergency work to save it, compromised its integrity.

Stanwell Park Rail Viaduct over Stanwell Creek was listed on the New South Wales State Heritage Register on 2 April 1999 having satisfied the following criteria.

The place is important in demonstrating the course, or pattern, of cultural or natural history in New South Wales.

The Stanwell Creek railway viaduct was the major bridge of the duplication and deviations works on the Illawarra Line 1910-20 between Waterfall and Scarborough. At Stanwell Park, the work kept the new double track line high up in the natural amphitheatre which in turn required a high level crossing of Stanwell Creek.

The place is important in demonstrating aesthetic characteristics and/or a high degree of creative or technical achievement in New South Wales.

The structure is one of the most impressive bridge structures in Australia, eight brick arches sweeping round a sharp railway curve atop brick piers that reach 110 feet (34 m) above the creek bed.

The view is now obscured by tree and bushland growth. Archival photographs show the structures.

The place has strong or special association with a particular community or cultural group in New South Wales for social, cultural or spiritual reasons.

The duplication and deviation work on the Illawarra Railway brought enormous social and commercial benefits to the Illawarra Region, which were only achieved through major engineering works such as the Stanwell Creek Viaduct and the five new double-track tunnels.

The place has potential to yield information that will contribute to an understanding of the cultural or natural history of New South Wales.

Constructing the high level Stanwell Creek Viaduct involved two important technical items, building it 110 feet (34 m) above the creek bed and laying the bricks for the arches on a sharp railway curve.

The place possesses uncommon, rare or endangered aspects of the cultural or natural history of New South Wales.

This is only brick arch viaduct of its type and size in Australia.

The place is important in demonstrating the principal characteristics of a class of cultural or natural places/environments in New South Wales.

== See also ==
- List of railway bridges in New South Wales
- Historic bridges of New South Wales
