= Shire Christian School =

- Aerial view of the Shire Christian School

Location
- 16 Allies Road, Barden Ridge, Sutherland Shire, Sydney, New South Wales; Australia; 34°02′11″S 151°00′34″E

Information
- Former name: Sutherland Shire Christian School
- Type: Independent co-educational early learning, primary and secondary day school
- Motto: A Firm Foundation
- Denomination: Non-denominational Christian
- Established: 1977; 49 years ago
- Educational authority: NSW Department of Education
- Chairman: John Ishak
- Principal: David Stonestreet
- Staff: 106
- Years: Early learning and K–12
- Enrolment: 970 (2024)
- Campus type: Suburban
- Colours: Shire blue, shire red and white
- Song: Blessed is the Man (Psalm 1)
- Website: www.shirechristian.nsw.edu.au

Shire Christian School is an independent non-denominational Christian co-educational early learning, primary and secondary day school, located in Barden Ridge, a suburb in the Sutherland Shire area of Sydney, New South Wales, Australia. The school was founded as Sutherland Shire Christian School in 1977 by a group of local parents who felt a calling to provide their children with an environment in which to gain an education taught from a Christian perspective. They believed that these features were not to be seen in a public state school; because of this the school upholds a strong Christian ethos that influences most parts of school life.

In 2015 the school jumped nearly 200 places and ranked 65th in the State in NSW Higher School Certificate (HSC) results.

== Overview ==
The school consists of one large campus in the southern suburb of Barden Ridge, and this campus facilitates the two sections of the school:

- A high school (Years 7 to 12) and
- A junior school (Preschool to Year 6).

In 2016, the school's name was changed to Shire Christian School.

== Establishment ==
The School Association was formally founded in 1969 by several Christian families who wished to have a Christian environment for their children to grow and mature in. The school officially began in 1977 under the name Sutherland Shire Christian School and the Sutherland Shire Christian School Association Ltd was created two years later in 1979.

School classes were originally housed in several locations (such as local church halls) before the purchase of several hectares of farm land in the southern Sydney suburb of Barden Ridge, in 1981, where the school has continued to develop since.

Student enrolment summary
Year	No. of students
1977	11
1982	263
1987	564
1992	722
1997	752
2005	804
2019	841

== Junior School ==
The Junior School's curriculum is based around six main subject areas:

1. English
2. Mathematics
3. Science and Technology
4. Human Society & Its Environment
5. Creative & Practical Arts
6. Physical Education, Health & Personal Development

== High school ==
=== Electives ===
The school offers a wide range of electives at Stage 5 (Yrs 9 and 10) and Stage 6 (Yrs 11 and 12), including extension classes depending upon demand. Students are also able to participate in courses through external providers such as TAFE. The school offers German as an elective and provides additional language courses through the NSW School of Languages.

=== HSC Results ===
In 2015 the school moved nearly 200 places and ranked 65th in the State in HSC results, making it one of the highest ranking schools in the area in that year. In recent years many final year students have been nominated and selected for the various HSC showcase events.

== Facilities and grounds ==
=== Location ===
The school is located in the suburban area of Barden Ridge on Allies Road near Lucas Heights Public School. The school has a scenic bushland setting providing not only shade for students but also a bush playground for junior students.

=== Facilities ===
The school has an abundance of facilities on its campus. These include a gymnasium, tennis and basketball courts and cricket nets to cater for all types of students needs and interests. Woodwork and metalwork rooms exist for students, along with a textiles room, a home economics room and several music rooms with recording studio rooms and an array of musical instruments. Two large libraries cater to both the Primary and Secondary schools. A more recent addition is the Tiered Learning Centre (TLC) and refurbished science laboratories.

== Extracurricular ==
There are several extracurricular clubs which run throughout the school each year. These include a sound and lighting team, debating team, a public speaking team, a concert band, junior and senior choirs, junior and senior guitar ensembles and the VIBE string ensemble.

=== The arts ===
Main cast of As You Like It

The school runs an annual drama performance made up of predominantly senior students and several members of drama classes throughout the school grades. These productions are supported by the entire school community through involvement in costuming, lighting, set design and direction. Recent productions have involved students from the junior school.

- 2007: Shakespeare's A Midsummer Night's Dream
- 2008: Shakespeare's Twelfth Night and Nick Enright's The Venetian Twins: The Musical
- 2009: Annie: The Musical
- 2011: Oliver: The Musical
- 2014: The Wizard of Oz
- 2015: Stephen Sondheim's Into the Woods

The Music Department also stages several smaller performance evenings as part of the peripatetic program alongside the two major musical evenings, the Primary Infants Performance Evening (PIPE) and For One Night Only (High School).

=== Sport ===
The Shire Christian School is a competitor in many inter-school competitions and participates strongly in Swimming, Athletic and Cross-Country competitions.

== Principals ==
Ordinal	Officeholder	Term start	Term end	Time in office	Notes
1	Geoffrey Lainson	1977	2001	23–24 years	
2	Stephen Renn	2001	2003	1–2 years	
3	John Myer [acting]	2003	2003	0 years	
4	Mark Lewis	2004	2005	0–1 years	
5	David Stonestreet	2005	2008	2–3 years	
6	Andrew Middleton	2008	2010	1–2 years	
7	Nicola Taylor	2010	2014	3–4 years	
8	Brett Hartley	2015	2021	10–11 years	
9	David Stonestreet	2022	2026	3–4 years	Acting Principal Dec 2021 – June 2022
10	Timothy Hewitt	2027			

== Notable alumni ==
- Kalani Ball – professional surfer
- Rebecca Breeds – actress

== See also ==
- List of non-government schools in New South Wales
