= Barden Ridge =

- Suburb
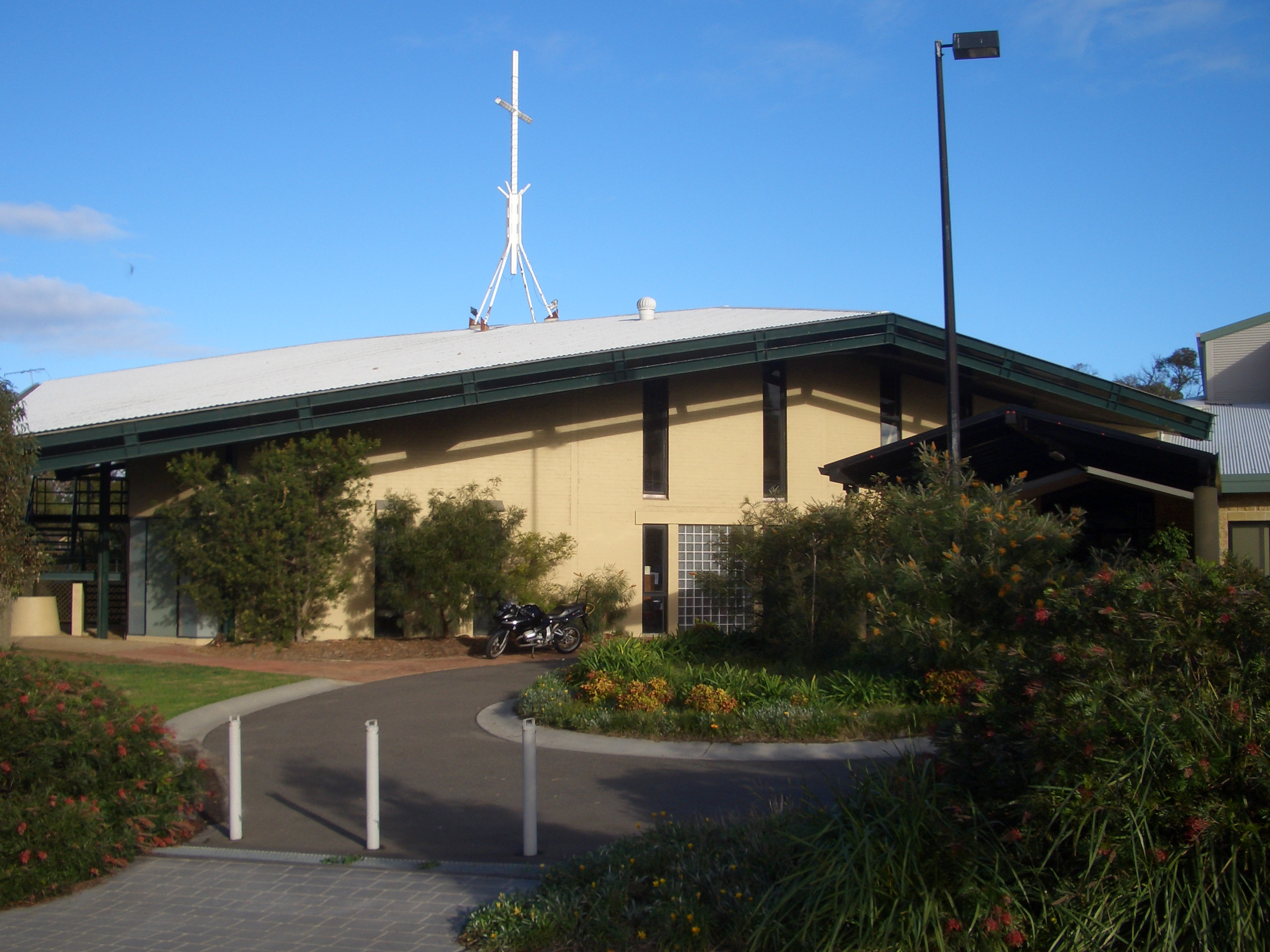
- St Pauls Anglican Church

- Interactive map of Barden Ridge
- Coordinates: 34°01′55″S 151°00′36″E
- Country: Australia
- State: New South Wales
- City: Sydney
- LGA: Sutherland Shire
- Location: 29 km (18 mi) south of Sydney CBD
- Established: 1996

Government
  - State electorate: Holsworthy
  - Federal division: Hughes
- Elevation: 121 m (397 ft)

Population
  - Total: 4,129 (2021 census)
- Postcode: 2234
Suburbs around Barden Ridge
Holsworthy	Menai	Bangor
Lucas Heights	Barden Ridge	Woronora Heights
Lucas Heights	Engadine	Engadine

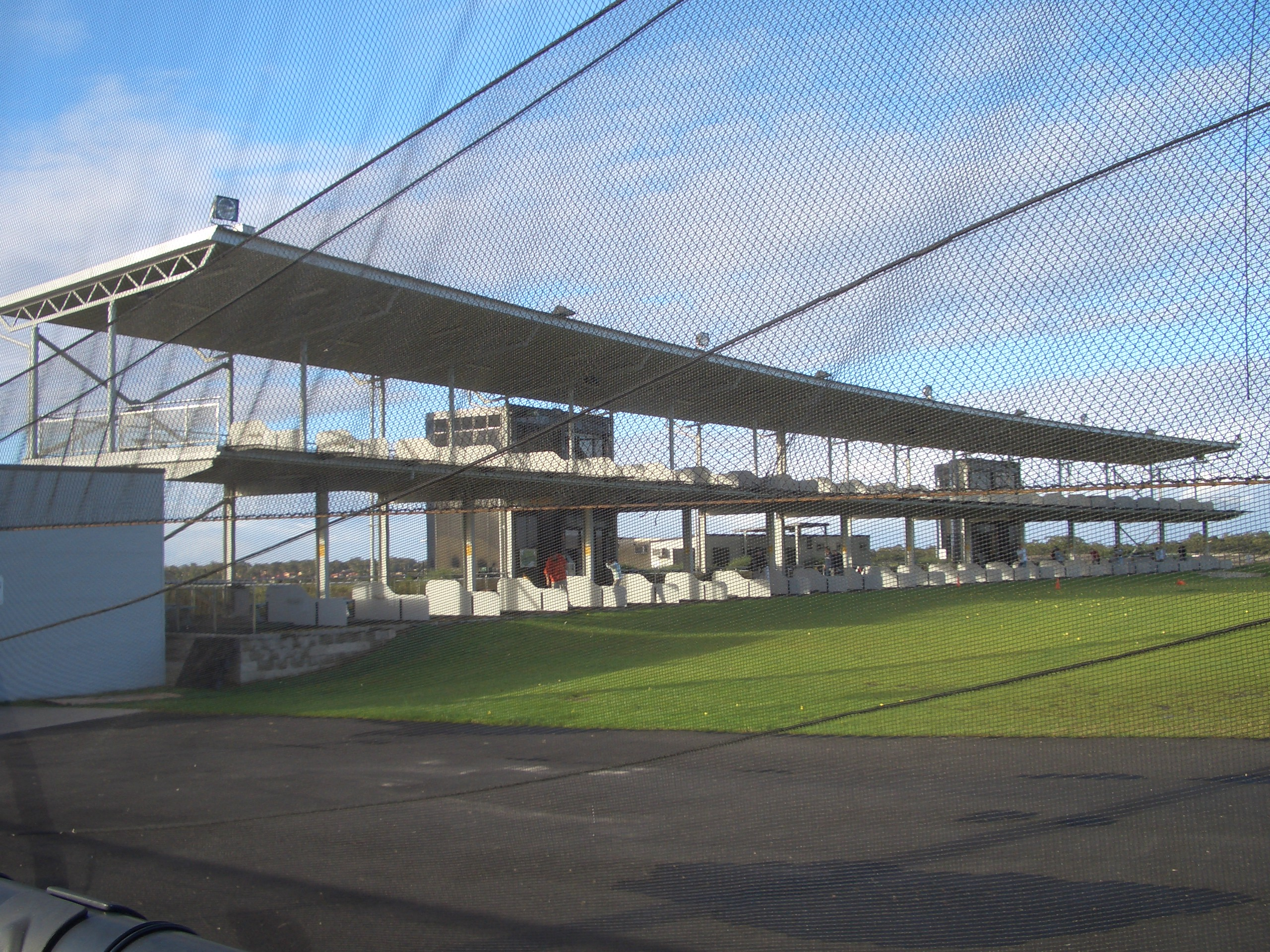
The Ridge, Golf Driving Range

Barden Ridge is a suburb in southern Sydney, in the state of New South Wales, Australia. Barden Ridge is located 29 kilometres south of the Sydney central business district in the local government area of the Sutherland Shire. Barden Ridge is colloquially known to locals as 'The Ridge' or 'Bardo'.

== Location ==
Barden Ridge is located on the Woronora River, which flows north into the Georges River. 'The Needles' is a body of water (ria) on the Woronora River, on one of the original roads west from Helensburgh. On the northern side of the ria lies the fresh water source of the Woronora River, whilst on the other side is salt water. The water, between two steep hills, remains so cold that even during summer it has been known to have caused heart attacks. While car access has been generally blocked, pedestrian access is still available. This area is also popular for recreational activities such as hiking and mountain biking.

Barden Ridge has shifted from a remote bushland area to an exclusive suburb that now contains all the necessary amenities that have established a strong community.

== History ==
Barden Ridge was named after Alfred Barden, whose pioneering family is associated with the Bangor area prior to the 1850s. In early times Barden Ridge had been used to identify the geographical location which was later given to the suburb that developed here. The suburb was originally named Lucas Heights.

The area now known as Bardon Ridge lies on the traditional lands of Dharawal people.

The area has faced several extreme bushfire incidents, with the most notable evacuation occurring in the early 2000s.

== Demographics ==
According to the 2021 census of Population, there were 4,129 residents in Barden Ridge. 83.5% of people were born in Australia. The next most common country of birth was England at 2.8%. 86.5% of people spoke only English at home. The most common responses for religious affiliation were Catholic 28.8%, No Religion 27.7%, Anglican 19.0% and Eastern Orthodox 5.5%.

== Transport ==
The nearest train station is at Sutherland on the Sydney Trains Illawarra railway line. There is also another close railway station at Padstow. U-Go Mobility operates the local bus service.

In 2005, the Bangor Bypass was completed. It takes motorists directly from Sutherland to Barden Ridge, instead of passing through Menai and Bangor. A new section of the Bypass was constructed and passes by Barden Ridge improving the current access to the area and Heathcote Road (to the south).

== Sport and recreation ==
The Ridge Sports Complex is a major sporting facility on the western side of New Illawarra Road. It features playing fields and associated amenities buildings, netball courts, men's shed, dog park, BMX track, synthetic athletics track, a golf driving range, The Ridge Golf Course, and club facilities to service the needs of the sporting and golfing community. Also planned for this area are hockey fields.

There is also another Baseball/AFL oval and a park directly adjacent to Lucas Heights Community School, which itself has two sporting fields and three basketball courts. Shire Christian School also has a sporting field and two multi-use tennis courts. There are other parks and nature reserves scattered throughout the suburb.

Barden Ridge is home to the Barden Ridgebacks Football Club, the Barden Ridgebacks Netball Club, the Shire R/C Aircraft club, Illawong Marlins Baseball Club and The Barden Ridge Comets Cricket Team.

== Schools ==
Barden Ridge has two schools: Lucas Heights Community School [K–12] and Shire Christian School.

== Churches ==
St Paul's Anglican Church and the Sutherland Reformed Church.

== Politics ==
Barden Ridge has a long Liberal Party history with a majority of its constituents being Liberal Party voters. It comes under the Federal seat of Hughes, which is currently held by Labor MP, David Moncrieff who won the seat in the 2025 federal election from Liberal MP Jenny Ware. In State Government, it comes under the seat of Holsworthy, which is currently held by the Liberal MP, Tina Ayyad. In Local Government, Barden Ridge falls under Sutherland Shire E Ward, which has three representatives.

== Emergency services ==
Barden Ridge has its own Bushfire Brigade station and is served by the very close by Menai Police Station, NSW Ambulance Station and Fire and Rescue NSW Brigade.

== Aged care ==
The suburb is home to the Barden Lodge Retirement Home.

== Notable residents ==
- Home and Away and Blue Water High star Rebecca Breeds attended Shire Christian School.

== Gallery ==
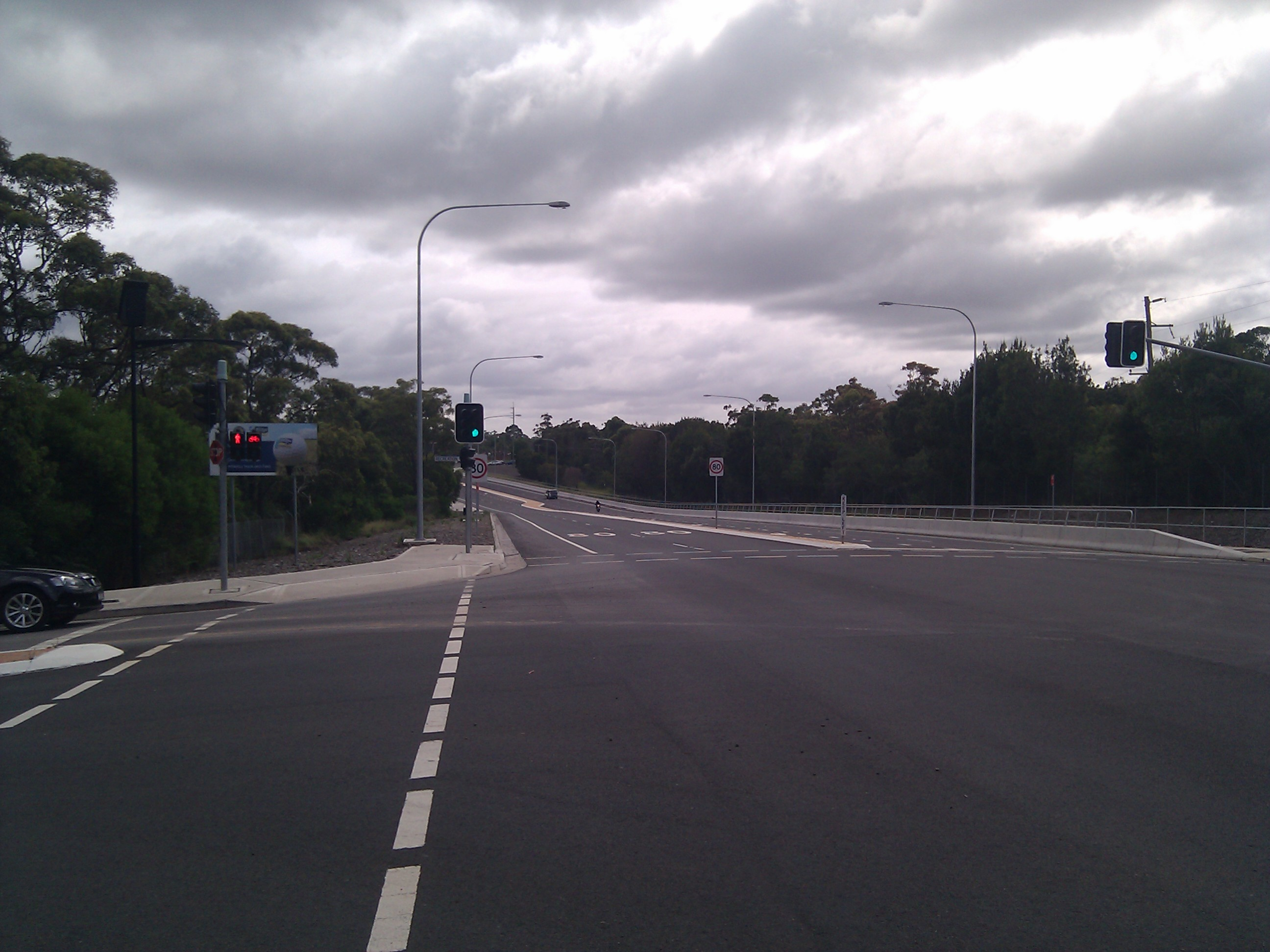
Barden Ridge NSW 2234, Australia - Panoramio #1

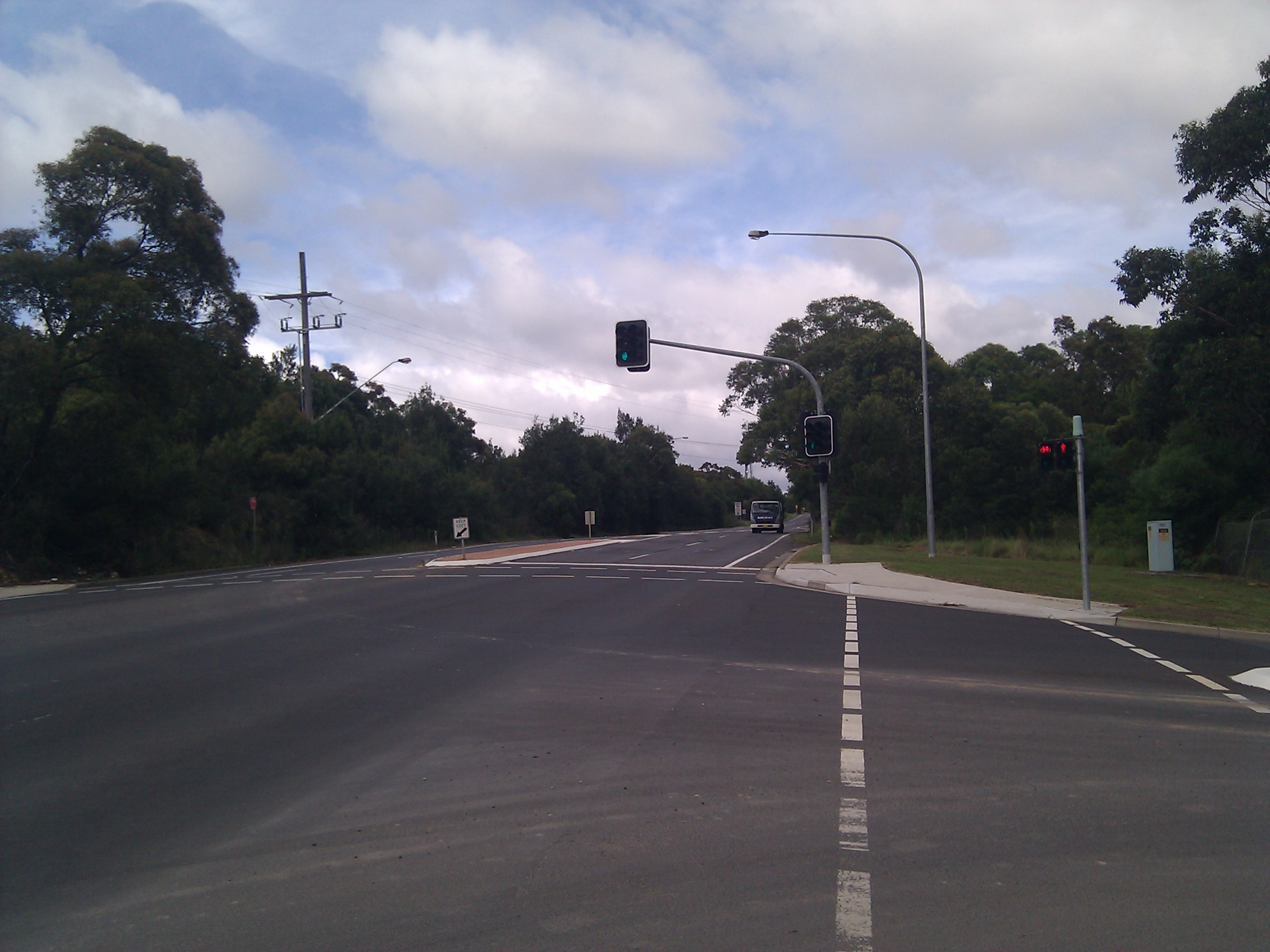
Barden Ridge NSW 2234, Australia - Panoramio #2

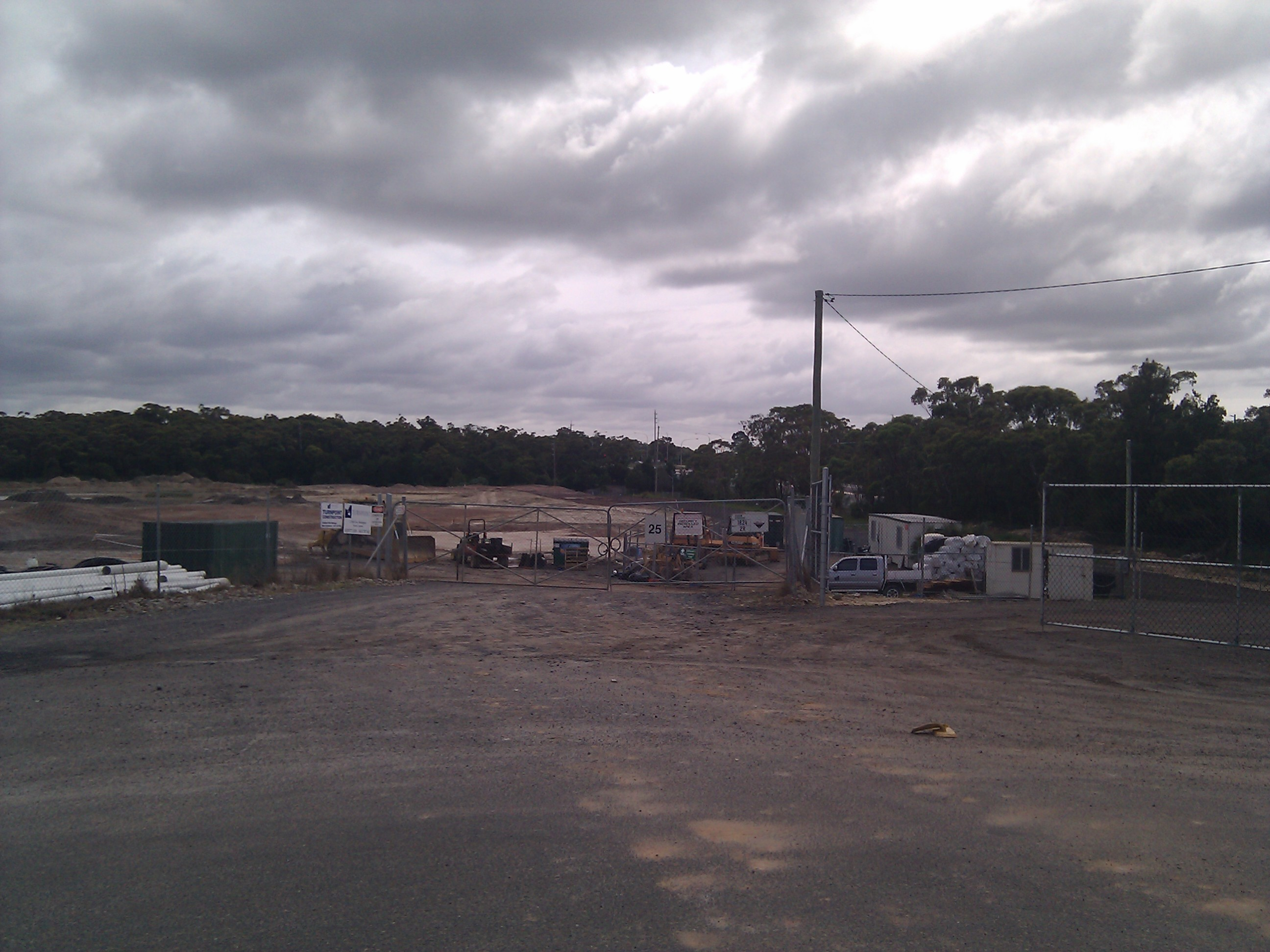
Barden Ridge NSW 2234, Australia - Panoramio #3

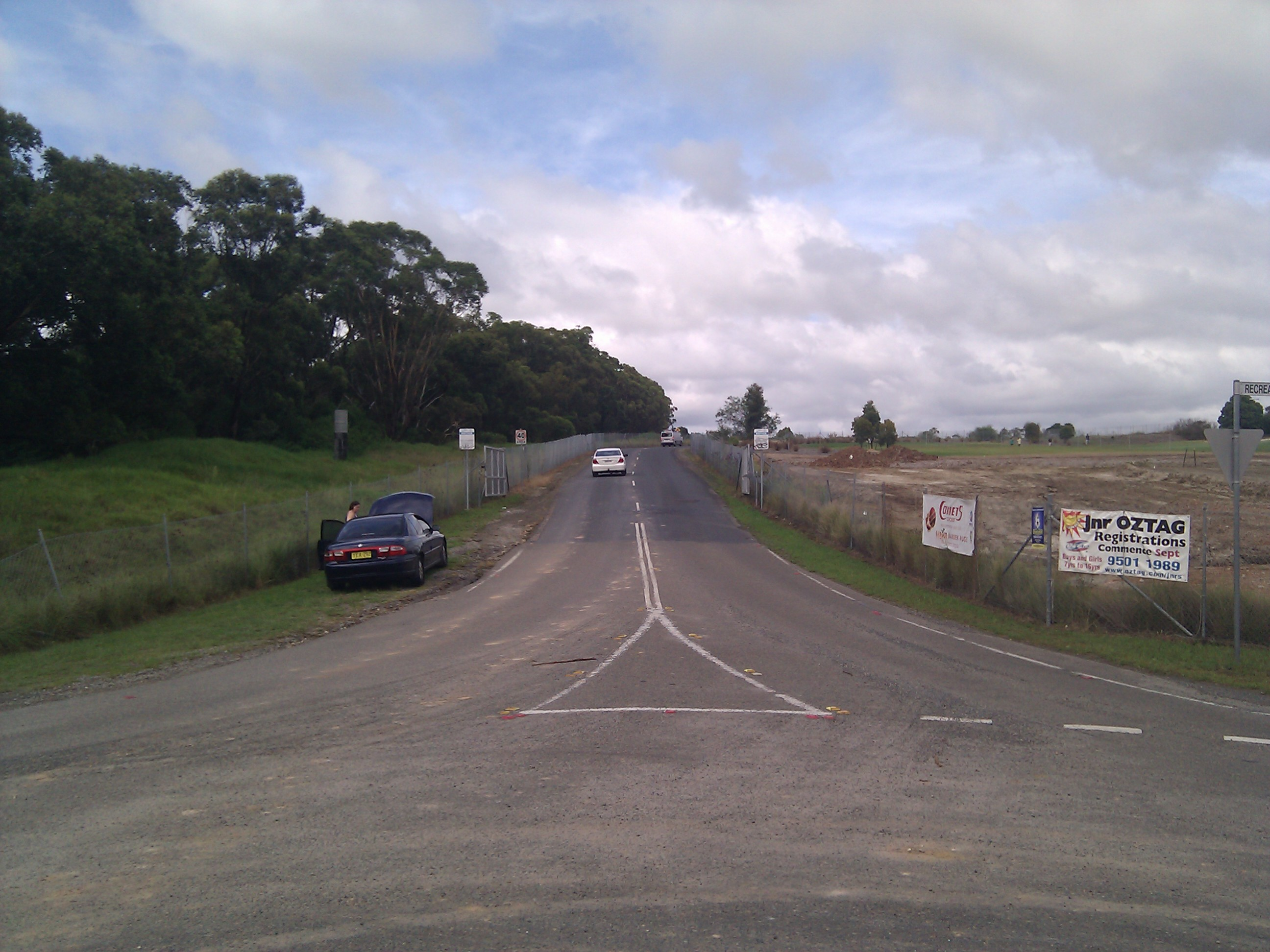
Barden Ridge NSW 2234, Australia - Panoramio #4

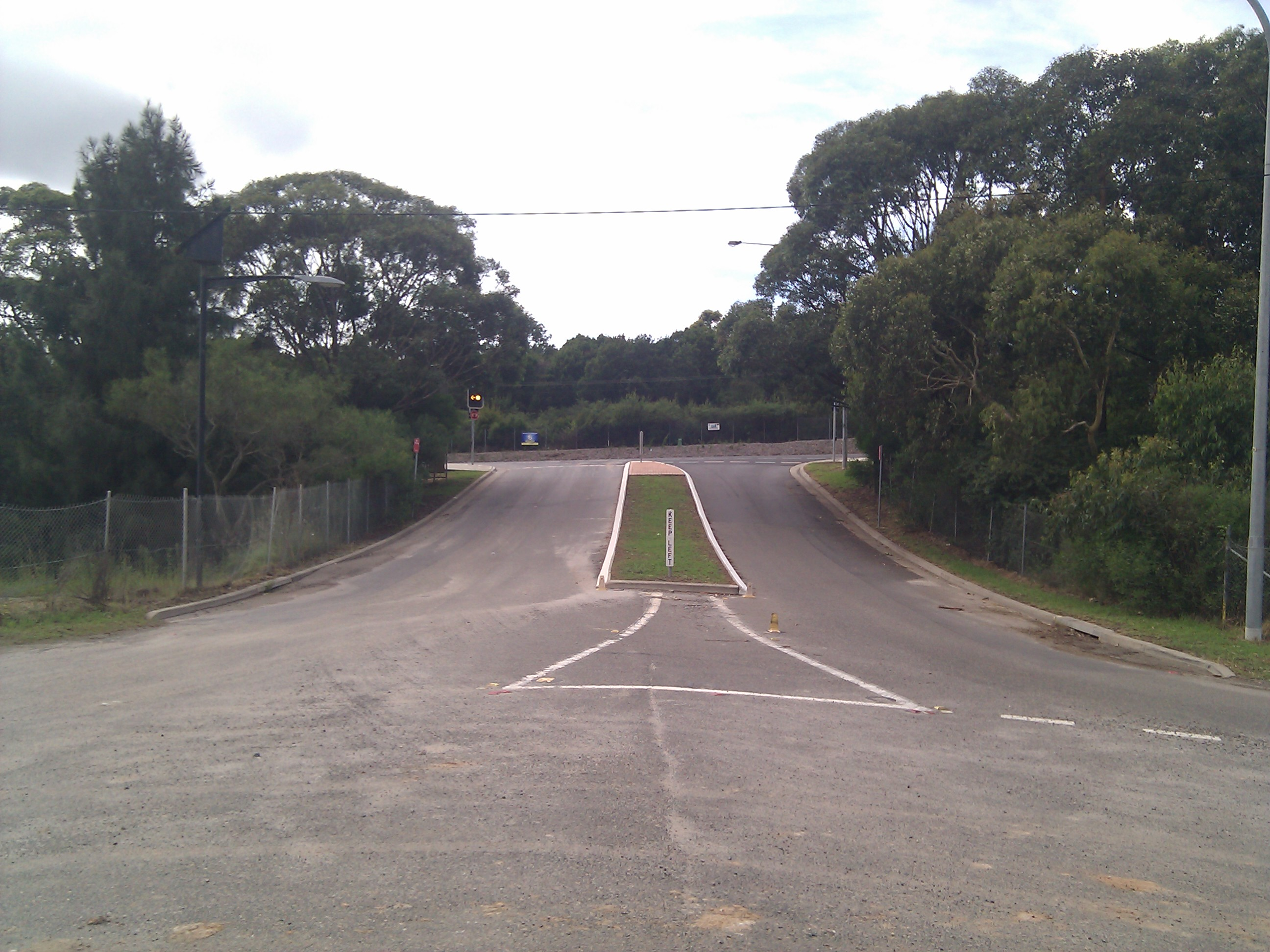
Barden Ridge NSW 2234, Australia - Panoramio #5

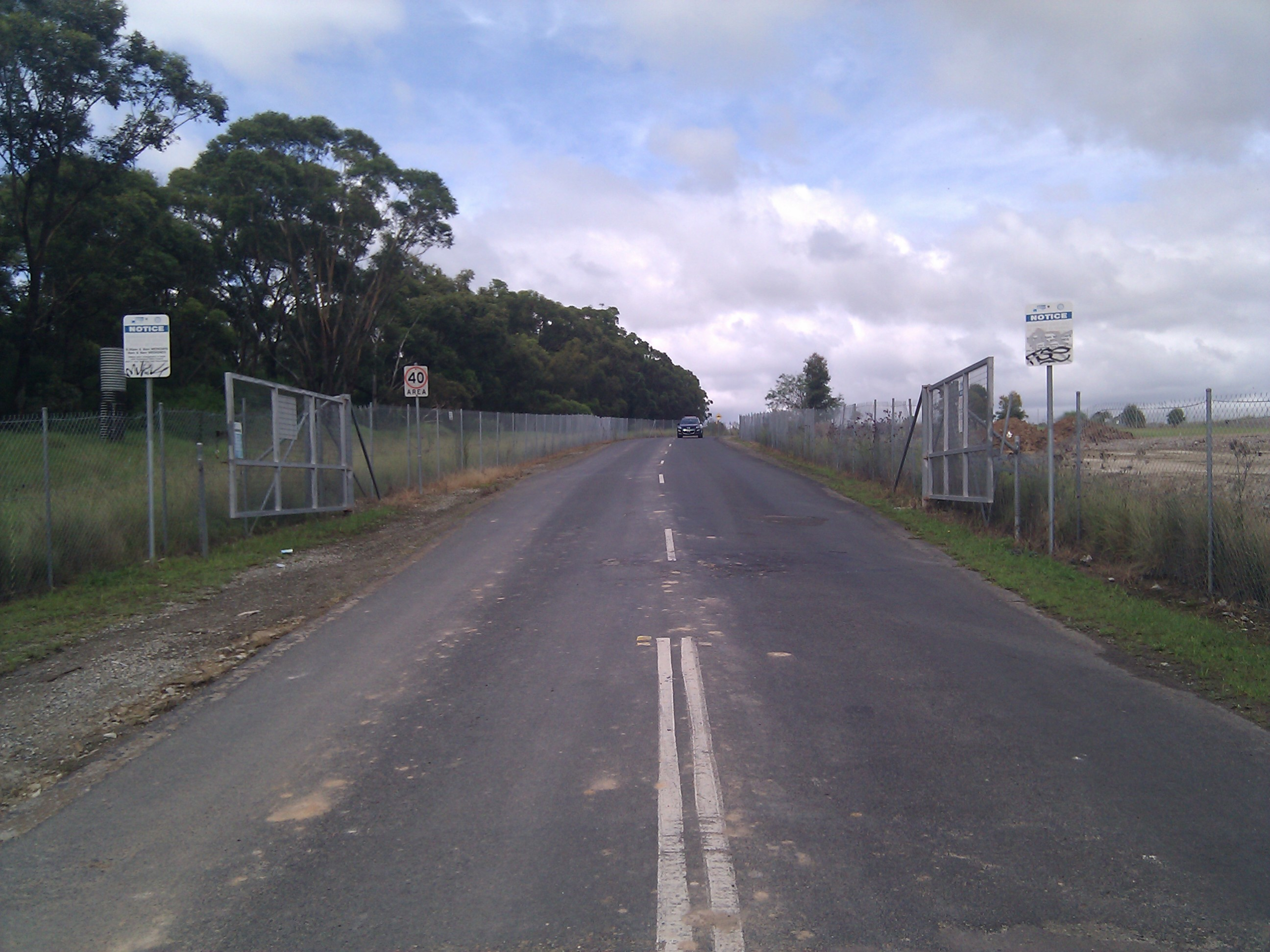
Barden Ridge NSW 2234, Australia - Panoramio #6

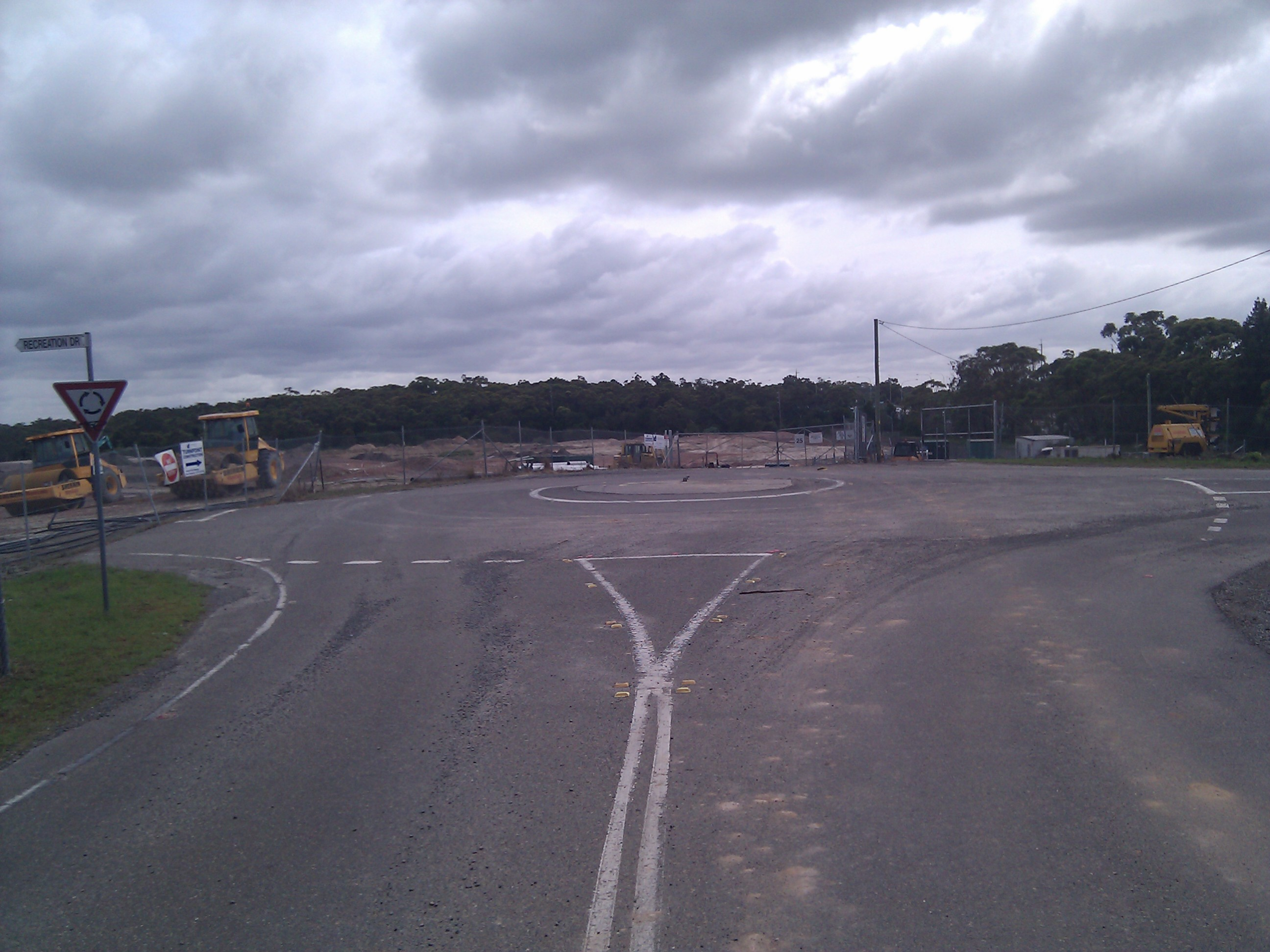
Barden Ridge NSW 2234, Australia - Panoramio #7

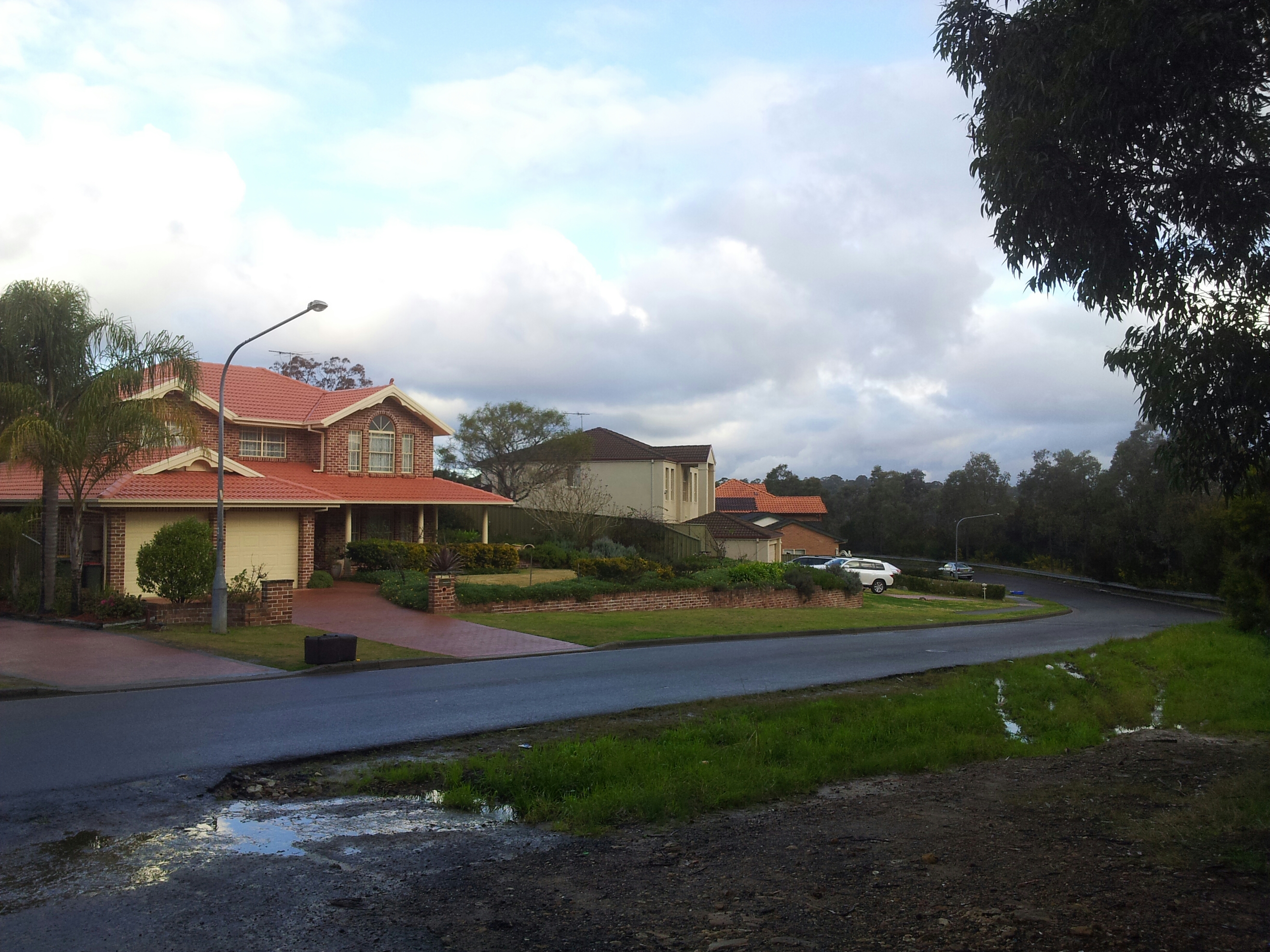
Barden Ridge NSW 2234, Australia - Panoramio #8

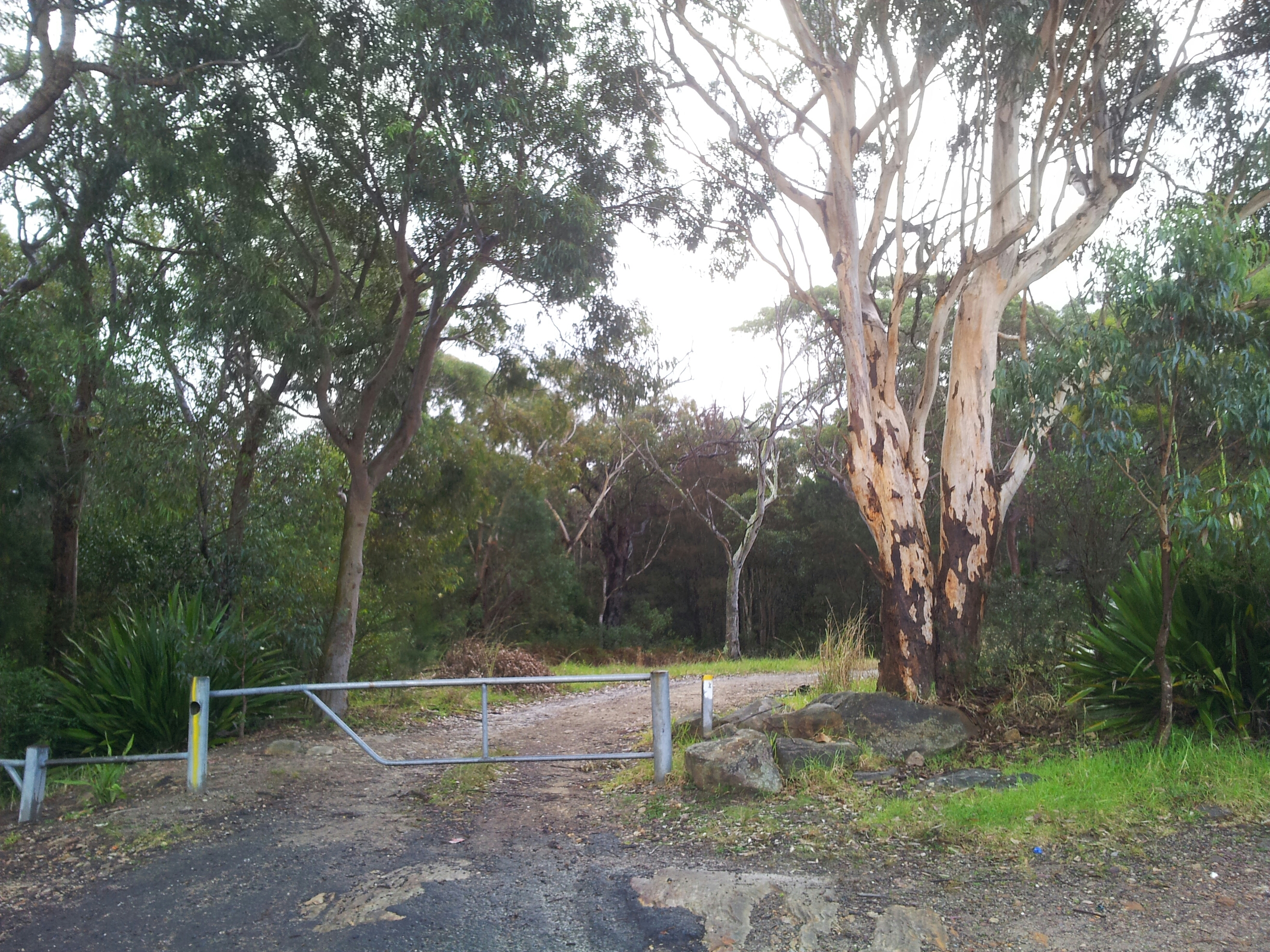
Barden Ridge NSW 2234, Australia - Panoramio #9

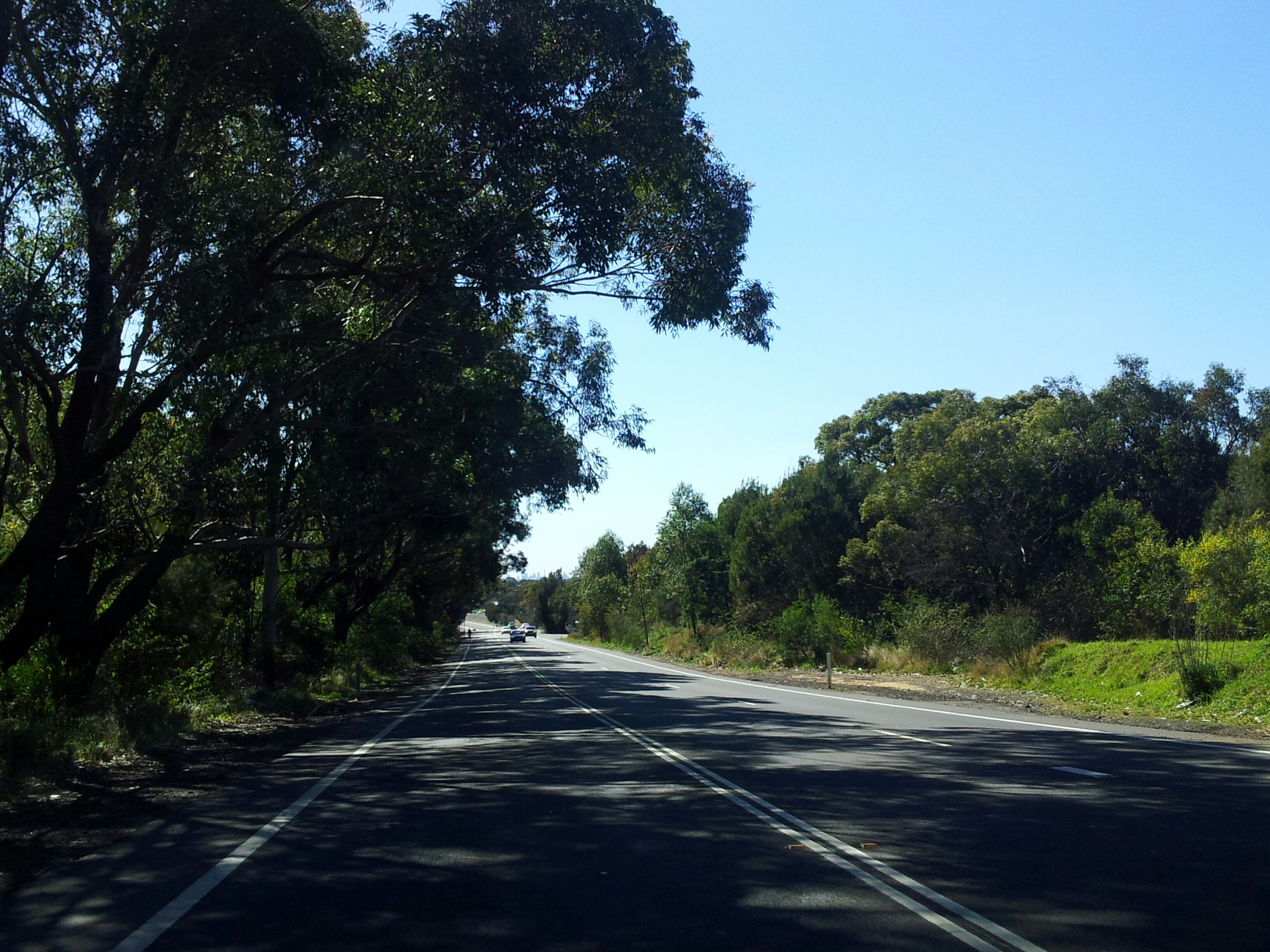
Barden Ridge NSW 2234, Australia - Panoramio #10

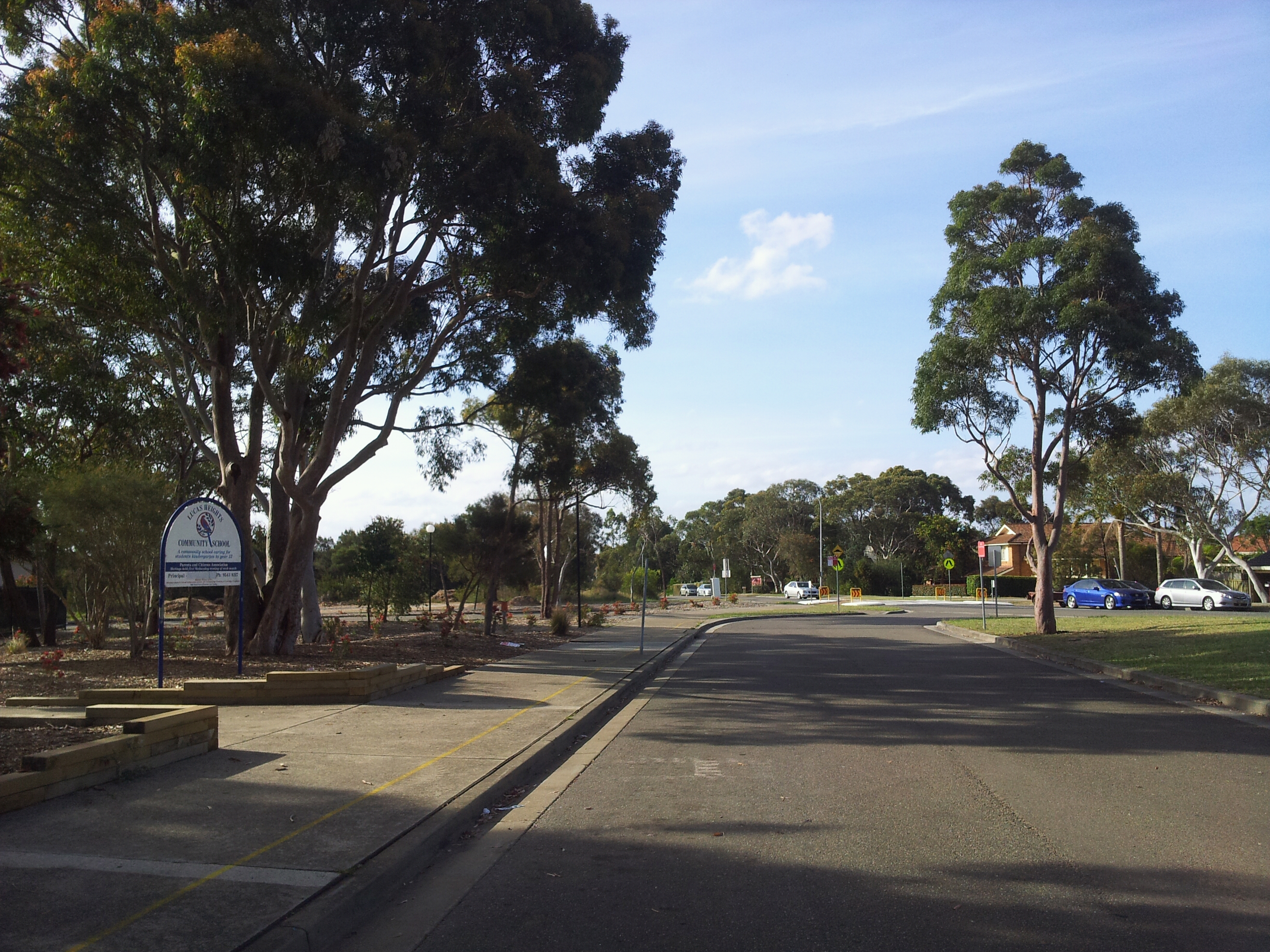
Barden Ridge NSW 2234, Australia - Panoramio #11

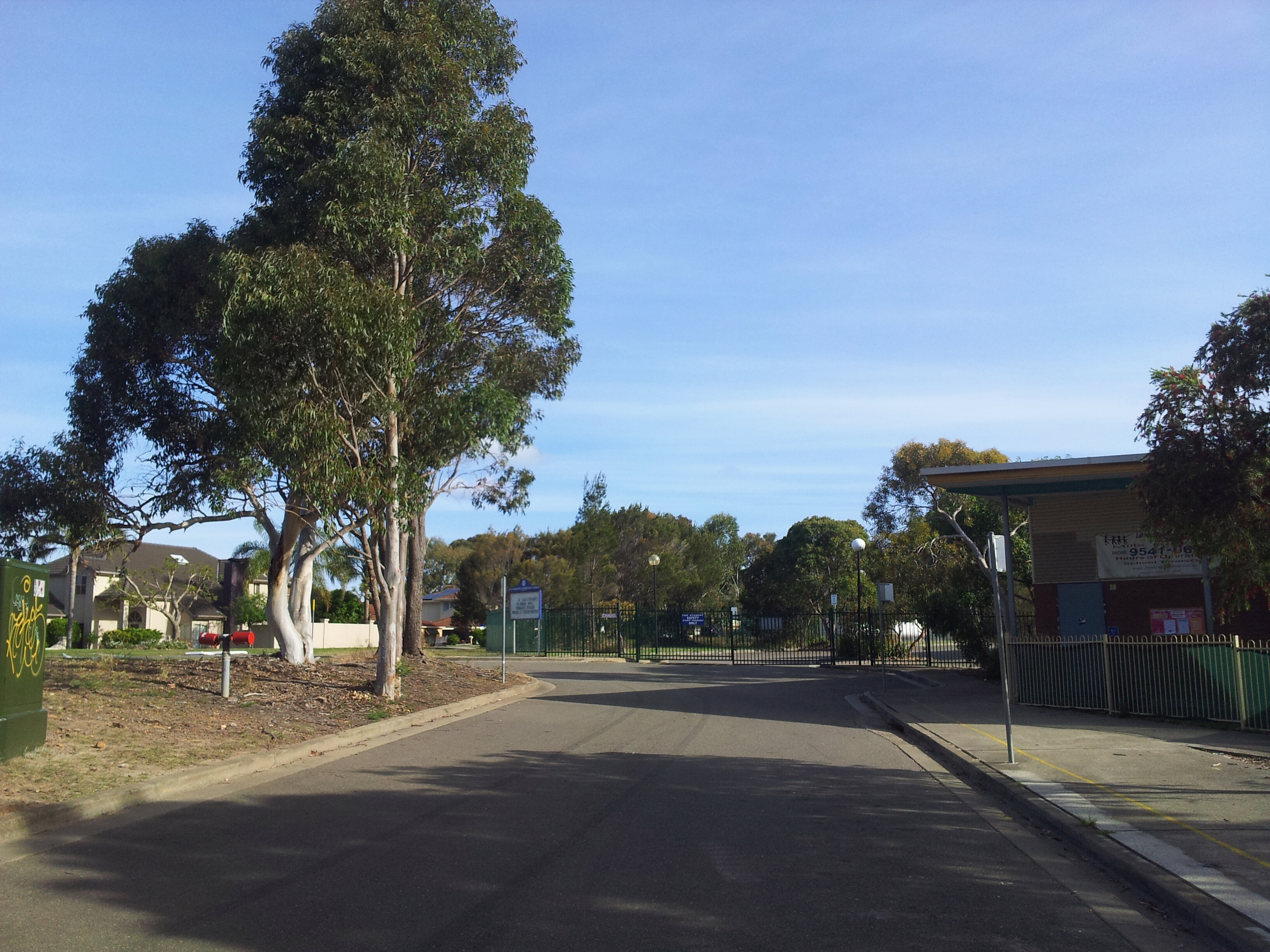
Barden Ridge NSW 2234, Australia - Panoramio #12

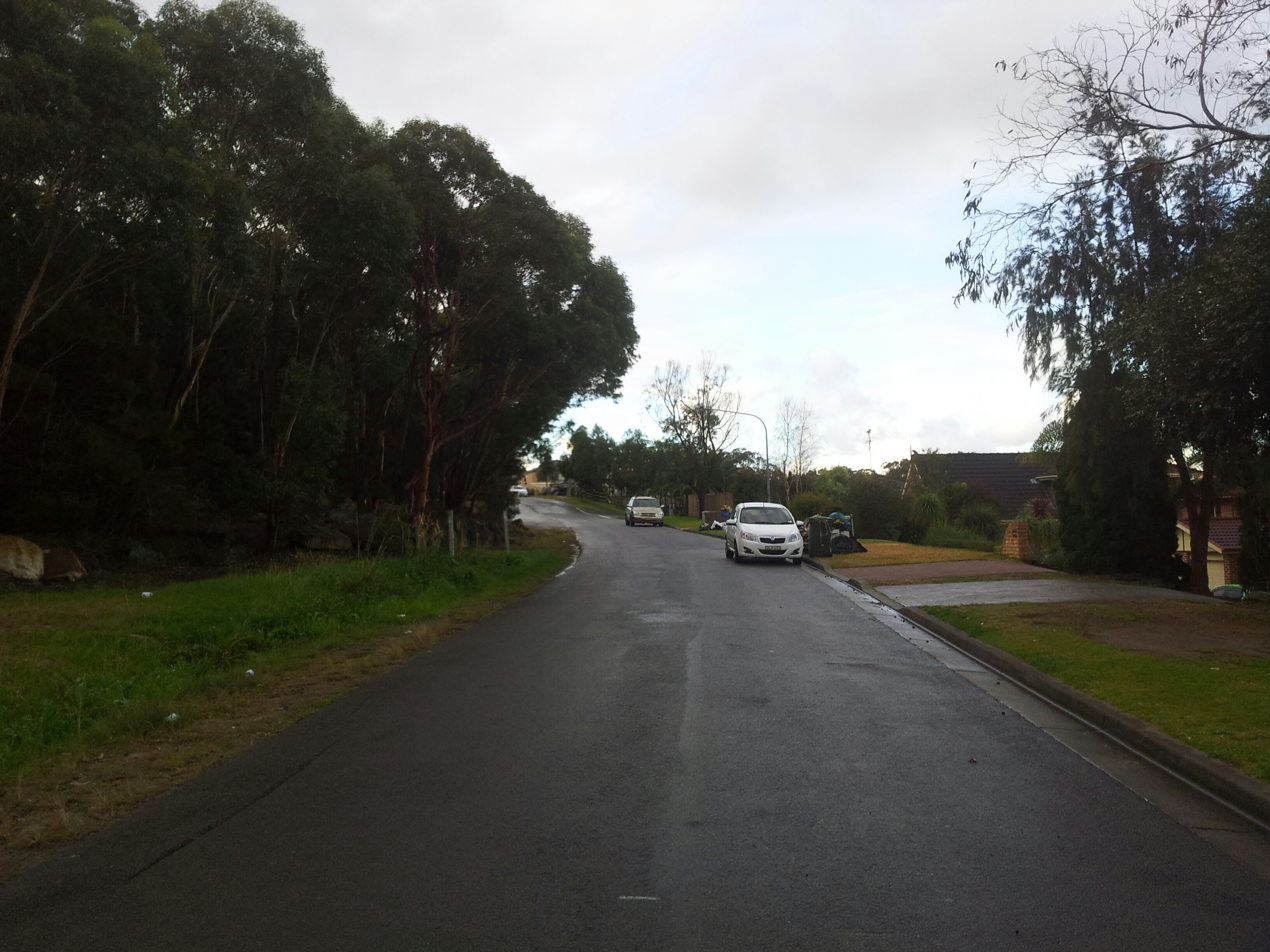
Thomas Mitchell Drive at Barden Ridge
