= Kalani Ball =

Australian surfer

Kalani Ball (born 26 March 1997) is an Australian professional surfer from Stanwell Park, NSW. Kalani finished 2017 ranked 86 on the qualifying series. Kalani's sponsors include Ocean and Earth, Sanuk, Mayhem Surfboards.

== Biography ==
Kalani had numerous junior titles before 2014, and won his 2nd Mick lowe trophy.
