= Gymea railway station =

Railway station in Sydney, New South Wales, Australia

Gymea
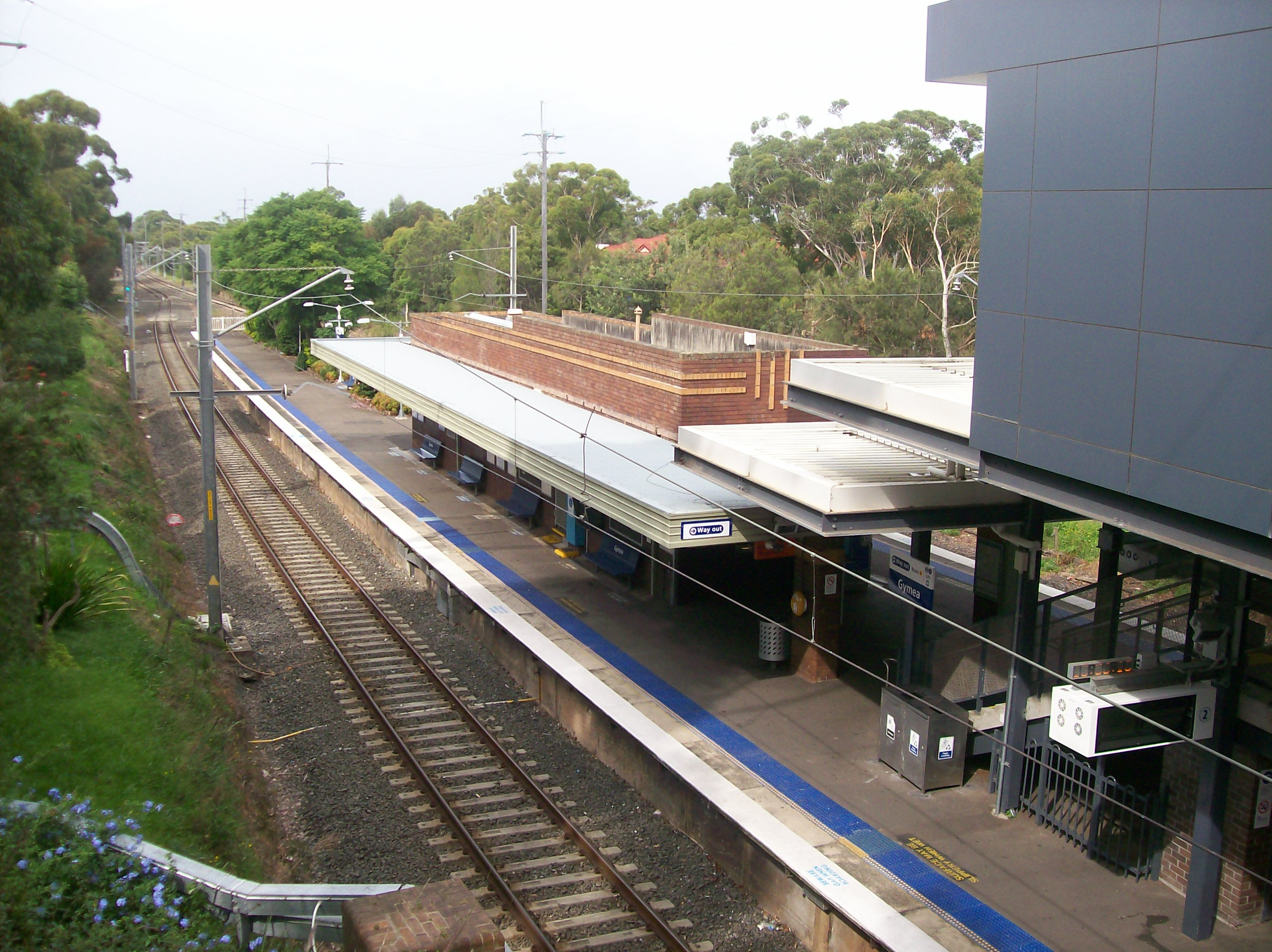
- Eastbound view of Platform 1, April 2012

General information
- Location: Gymea Bay Road, Gymea; Sydney, New South Wales; Australia
- Coordinates: 34°02′06″S 151°05′07″E
- Elevation: 67 metres (220 ft)
- Owner: Transport Asset Manager of NSW
- Operator: Sydney Trains
- Line: Cronulla
- Distance: 27.94 km (17.36 mi) from Central
- Platforms: 2 (1 island)
- Tracks: 2
- Connections: Bus

Construction
- Structure type: Ground
- Accessible: Yes

Other information
- Status: Weekdays: Staffed: 6am to 7pm: Weekends and public holidays: Staffed: 8am to 4pm
- Station code: GYM
- Website: Transport for NSW

History
- Opened: 16 December 1939 (86 years ago)
- Electrified: Yes (from opening)

Passengers
- 2025: 970,365 (year); 2,659 (daily) (Sydney Trains)
- Rank: 130

Services
Preceding station	Sydney Trains	Following station
Miranda towards Cronulla	Eastern Suburbs & Illawarra Line	Kirrawee towards Bondi Junction
Location

Gymea railway station is a suburban railway station located on the Cronulla line, serving the Sydney suburb of Gymea. It is served by Sydney Trains T4 Eastern Suburbs & Illawarra Line services.

== History ==
Gymea station opened on 16 December 1939 when the Cronulla line opened from Sutherland to Cronulla.

The station was upgraded in 2005 and given a lift and canopies over the stairs.

Originally, Gymea was one of two crossing loops on the line, with the other being at Caringbah. The section from Gymea to Caringbah was duplicated in 1985, and under the Rail Clearways Program, the remaining sections of single line railway from Sutherland to Gymea and Caringbah to Cronulla were duplicated in April 2010.

== Services ==
=== Platforms ===
Platform	Line	Stopping pattern	Notes
1	T4	services to Bondi Junction	
2	T4	services to Cronulla	

=== Transport links ===
U-Go Mobility operates two bus routes via Gymea station, under contract to Transport for NSW:

- 974: Westfield Miranda to Gymea Bay
- 975: Westfield Miranda to Grays Point
