= SLD =

SLD may refer to:

== Computers and technology ==
- Second-level domain, an Internet domain directly beneath the top-level domain
- Simple learning design 2.0, a specification used to express learning activities
- SLD resolution, the basic inference rule used in logic programming
- Stanford Large Detector (1992–1998), for the Stanford Linear Collider
- Superluminescent diode, a light source
- Soft laser desorption, a laser desorption of large molecules that results in ionization without fragmentation
- System Landscape Directory, a component of SAP NetWeaver Development Infrastructure

== Graphics ==
- Single-line diagram, of a 3-phase power system
- Straight-line diagram of a road
- Styled Layer Descriptor of map layers

== Politics and law ==
- Democratic Left Alliance (Sojusz Lewicy Demokratycznej), a Polish centre-left political party
- Democratic Left Association (Stowarzyszenie Lewicy Demokratycznej), a political party in Poland
- Social and Liberal Democrats, former name of the Liberal Democrats (UK)
- Statute law database, UK

== Transport ==
- Salford Crescent railway station, Greater Manchester, England, National Rail station code SLD
- Sliač Airport, Slovakia, IATA code
- Sutherland railway station, Sydney Sutherland, Australia, station code SLD

== Other uses ==
- Self love deficient, the defining trait of echoism
- SLD glass, with low dispersion
- Severe learning difficulties, a UK term for a level of Special Educational Needs (SEN)
- Specific learning disability, disorders intrinsic to an individual
- Supercooled Large Droplet, a type of atmospheric icing condition
- Delta8-fatty-acid desaturase, an enzyme
