= Miranda railway station =

Railway station in Sydney, New South Wales, Australia

Miranda
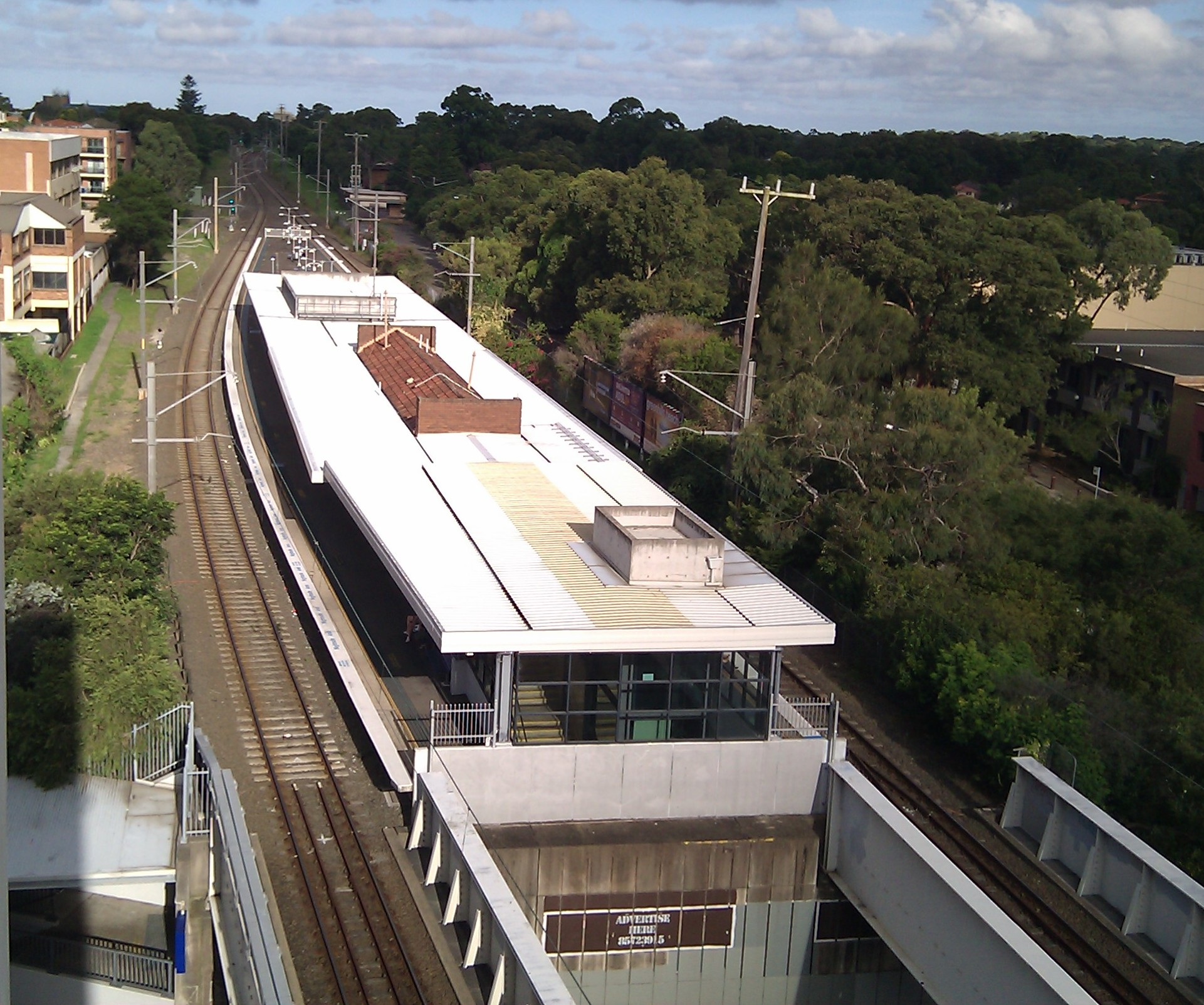
- Eastbound view of station platforms in February 2012

General information
- Location: Kiora Road, Miranda; Sydney, New South Wales; Australia
- Coordinates: 34°02′10″S 151°06′08″E
- Elevation: 42 metres (138 ft)
- Owner: Transport Asset Manager of NSW
- Operator: Sydney Trains
- Line: Cronulla
- Distance: 29.51 km (18.34 mi) from Central
- Platforms: 2 (1 island)
- Tracks: 2
- Connections: Bus

Construction
- Structure type: Elevated
- Accessible: Yes

Other information
- Status: Staffed
- Station code: MIJ
- Website: Transport for NSW

History
- Opened: 26 December 1939 (86 years ago)
- Electrified: Yes (from opening)

Passengers
- 2025: 1,940,607 (year); 5,317 (daily) (Sydney Trains)
- Rank: 80

Services
Preceding station	Sydney Trains	Following station
Caringbah towards Cronulla	Eastern Suburbs & Illawarra Line	Gymea towards Bondi Junction
Location

Miranda railway station is a suburban railway station located on the Cronulla line, serving the Sydney suburb of Miranda. It is served by Sydney Trains T4 Eastern Suburbs & Illawarra Line services.

== History ==
Miranda station opened on 16 December 1939 when the Cronulla line opened from Sutherland to Cronulla. It initially had a goods siding.

On 15 July 1985, the line between Gymea and Caringbah was duplicated with a new track laid north of the existing single line, with the platform converted to an island platform.

By January 2005, an upgrade to the station including a lift was complete.

In 2014, new station canopies were installed on the station platform.

== Services ==
=== Platforms ===
Platform	Line	Stopping pattern	Notes
1	T4	services to Bondi Junction	
2	T4	services to Cronulla	

=== Transport links ===
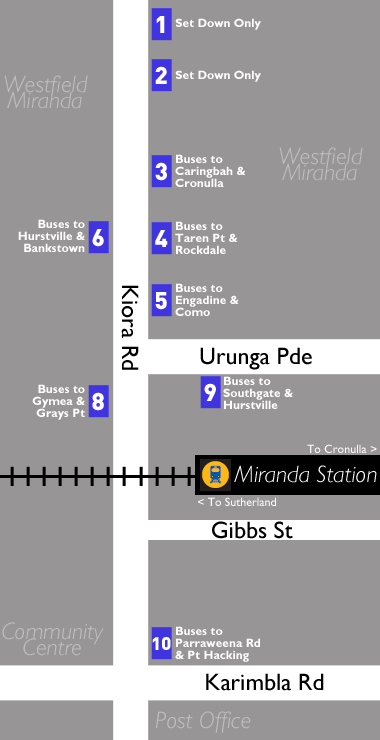
Miranda Station bus stands

Maianbar Bundeena Bus Service operates one bus route from Miranda station, under contract to Transport for NSW:

- 989: to Bundeena via Maianbar (Friday only)

Transit Systems operates two bus routes from Miranda station, under contract to Transport for NSW:

- 477: to Rockdale station via Sans Souci & Kogarah
- 478: to Rockdale station via Dolls Point & Brighton-Le-Sands (limited weekday off peak service)

U-Go Mobility operates 15 bus routes via Miranda station, under contract to Transport for NSW:

- 961: to Barden Ridge
- 962: to East Hills station
- 967: to Como West
- 968: to Bonnet Bay
- 969: to Sutherland station
- 970: to Hurstville via Sylvania Heights
- 971: Hurstville to Cronulla via Southgate
- 972: to Southgate
- 973: to Yowie Bay
- 974: to Gymea Bay
- 975: to Grays Point
- 977: to Lilli Pilli
- 978: to Port Hacking
- 986: to Miranda North (Parraweena Road)
- 993: to Woronora Heights
