= Sutherland Hospital =

Hospital in Sydney, Australia

- South Eastern Sydney Local Health District

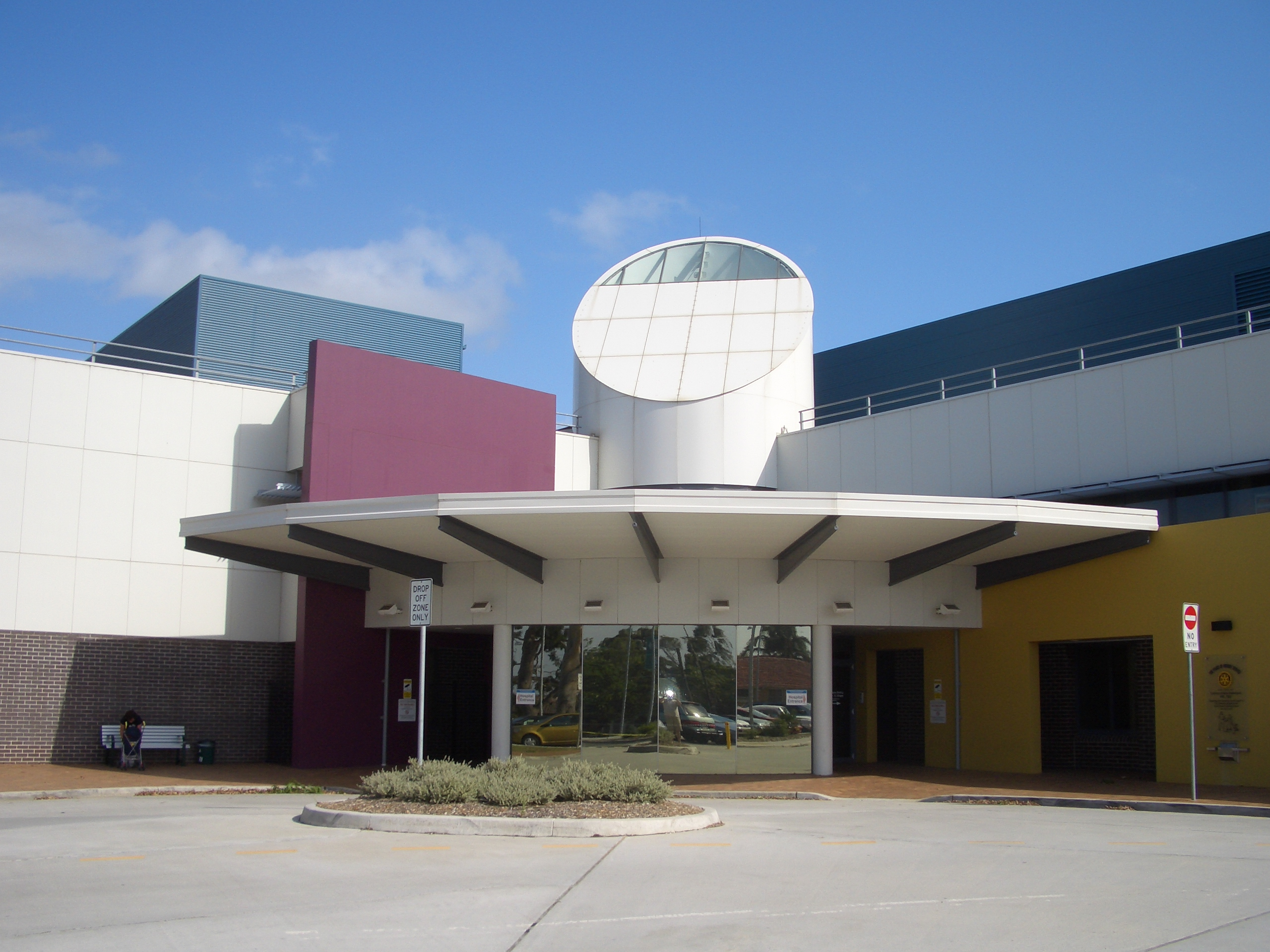
- Sutherland Hospital

Geography
- Location: Caringbah, Sydney, NSW, Australia
- Coordinates: 34.0372°S 151.1152°E

Organisation
- Care system: Public Medicare (AU)
- Type: Teaching, District General
- Affiliated university: University of New South Wales (medical)

Services
- Emergency department: Yes

History
- Founded: 1958

Links
- Website: Official Website
- Lists: Hospitals in Australia

Sutherland Hospital is a district general hospital, It has the part of the South Eastern Sydney Local Health District and is located in Caringbah, a southern suburb of Sydney, New South Wales, Australia. The hospital has a general medicine, general surgery, obstetrics and gynaecology, paediatrics, aged care, rehabilitation and psychiatry service. It is a teaching hospital of the University of New South Wales.

== History ==
The hospital was established in 1958 as a four-storey building with 3 wings, in an identical layout to the former Bankstown Hospital, which was constructed at about the same time. The hospital building was allowed to become run-down, and the lack of air conditioning and modern facilities prompted a redevelopment in the early 2000s. A new hospital building was constructed behind the original hospital in 2003–2004, with the original hospital later demolished. However the northern end of the building, containing the Emergency Department remains part of the old hospital building, the new building extended onto the old one.

On 28 October 2025, a woman was arrested for cutting off the gas supply and accessing a restricted area at Sutherland Hospital.

== Transport ==
Sutherland Hospital can be accessed by bus services, operated by two companies. U-Go Mobility operates routes between Caringbah railway station and Westfield Miranda. Transit Systems services provide a link from Westfield Miranda to Rockdale station.

The hospital lies between two railway stations, Caringbah and Miranda, and the section is one of the longest between stations. A proposed railway station near the hospital has been discussed in the community. A 2002 joint study between Sutherland Shire Council and the State Rail Authority was rejected, and was said to cost about $35 million. In 2014, a proposal for the station costing $20 million was designed, which included two side platforms, street access and a direct ramp to the hospital, and involve an additional minute travel time on the Cronulla railway line.

== See also ==
- List of hospitals in Australia
