= Kirrawee railway station =

Railway station in Sydney, New South Wales, Australia

Kirrawee
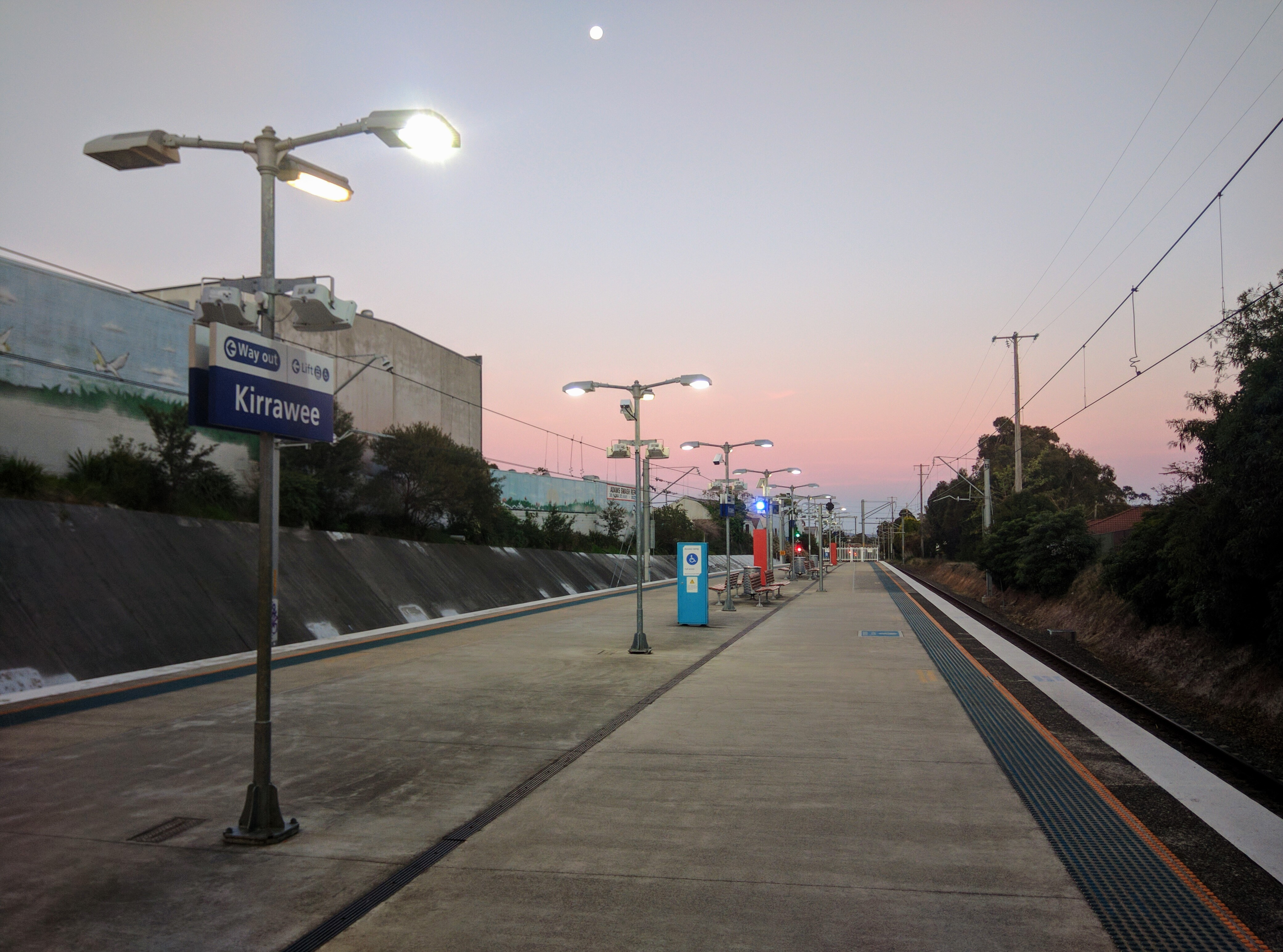
- Eastbound view from Platform 2, October 2016

General information
- Location: Oak Road, Kirrawee; Sydney, New South Wales; Australia
- Coordinates: 34°02′06″S 151°04′16″E
- Elevation: 98 metres (322 ft)
- Owner: Transport Asset Manager of NSW
- Operator: Sydney Trains
- Line: Cronulla
- Distance: 26.64 km (16.55 mi) from Central
- Platforms: 2 (1 island)
- Tracks: 2
- Connections: Bus

Construction
- Structure type: Ground
- Accessible: Yes

Other information
- Status: Weekdays: Staffed: 6am to 7pm: Weekends and public holidays: Staffed: 8am to 4pm
- Station code: KEE
- Website: Transport for NSW

History
- Opened: 16 December 1939 (86 years ago)
- Rebuilt: 2010 (16 years ago)
- Electrified: Yes (from opening)

Passengers
- 2025: 925,150 (year); 2,535 (daily) (Sydney Trains)
- Rank: 134

Services
Preceding station	Sydney Trains	Following station
Gymea towards Cronulla	Eastern Suburbs & Illawarra Line	Sutherland towards Bondi Junction
Location

Kirrawee railway station is a suburban railway station located on the Cronulla line, serving the Sydney suburb of Kirrawee. It is served by Sydney Trains T4 Eastern Suburbs & Illawarra Line services.

== History ==
Kirrawee station opened on 16 December 1939 when the Cronulla line opened from Sutherland to Cronulla. In 1954 there was a holdup, and a young man stole £43. Kirrawee railway station was rebuilt as part of the duplication of the remaining single track sections of the Cronulla line, under the Rail Clearways Program. Work commenced in late 2007 and was completed in April 2010. The platform used to extend to the other side of the Oak Road overbridge but was straightened by extending the platform to the east.

== Services ==
=== Platforms ===
Platform	Line	Stopping pattern	Notes
1	Eastern Suburbs & Illawarra Line	services to Bondi Junction	
2	Eastern Suburbs & Illawarra Line	services to Cronulla	

=== Transport links ===
U-Go Mobility operates two bus routes via President Avenue, near Kirrawee station, under contract to Transport for NSW:

- 976: Sutherland station to Grays Point
- 993: Westfield Miranda to Engadine

== Gallery ==
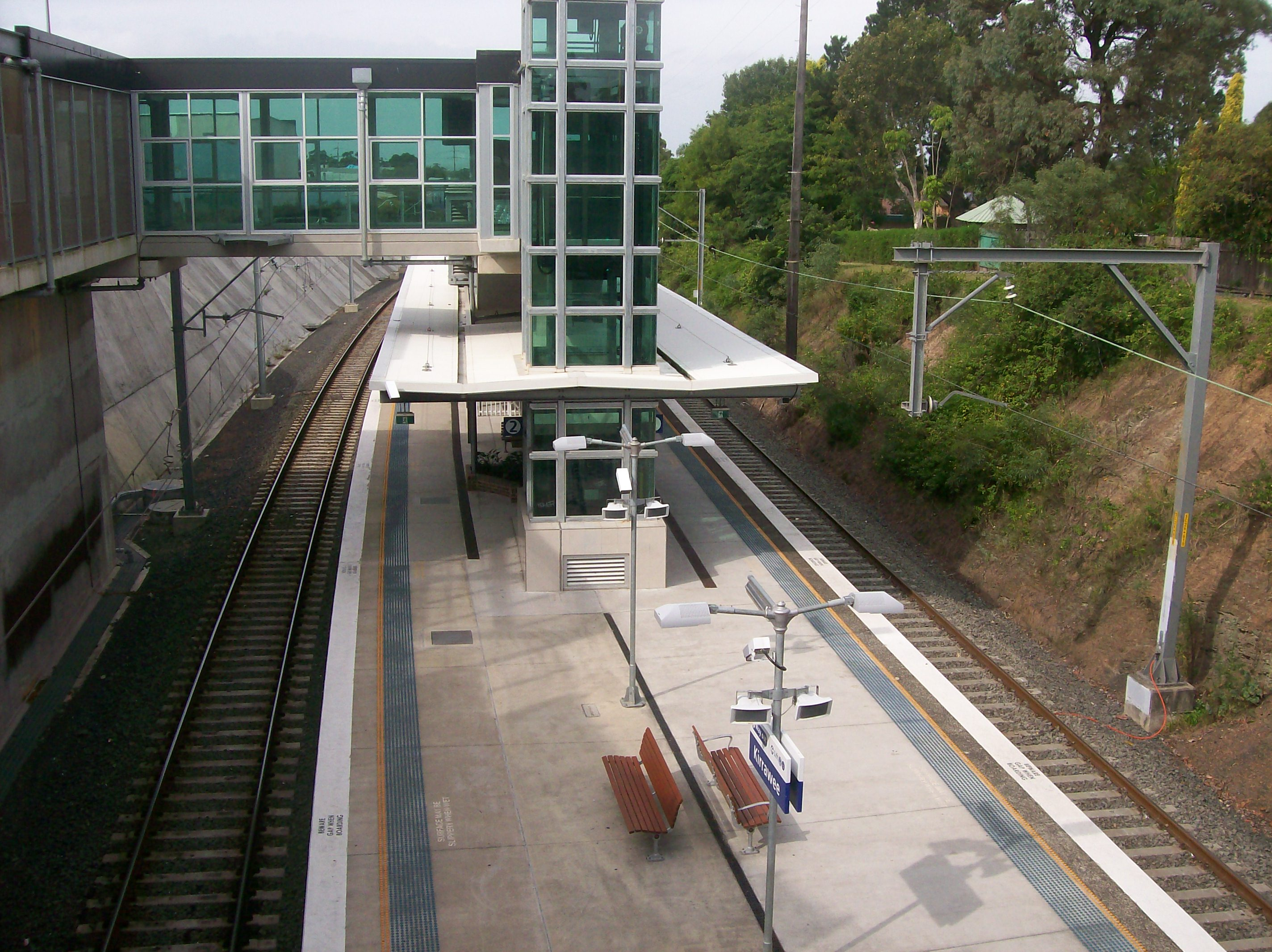
The station's concourse and lift in April 2012

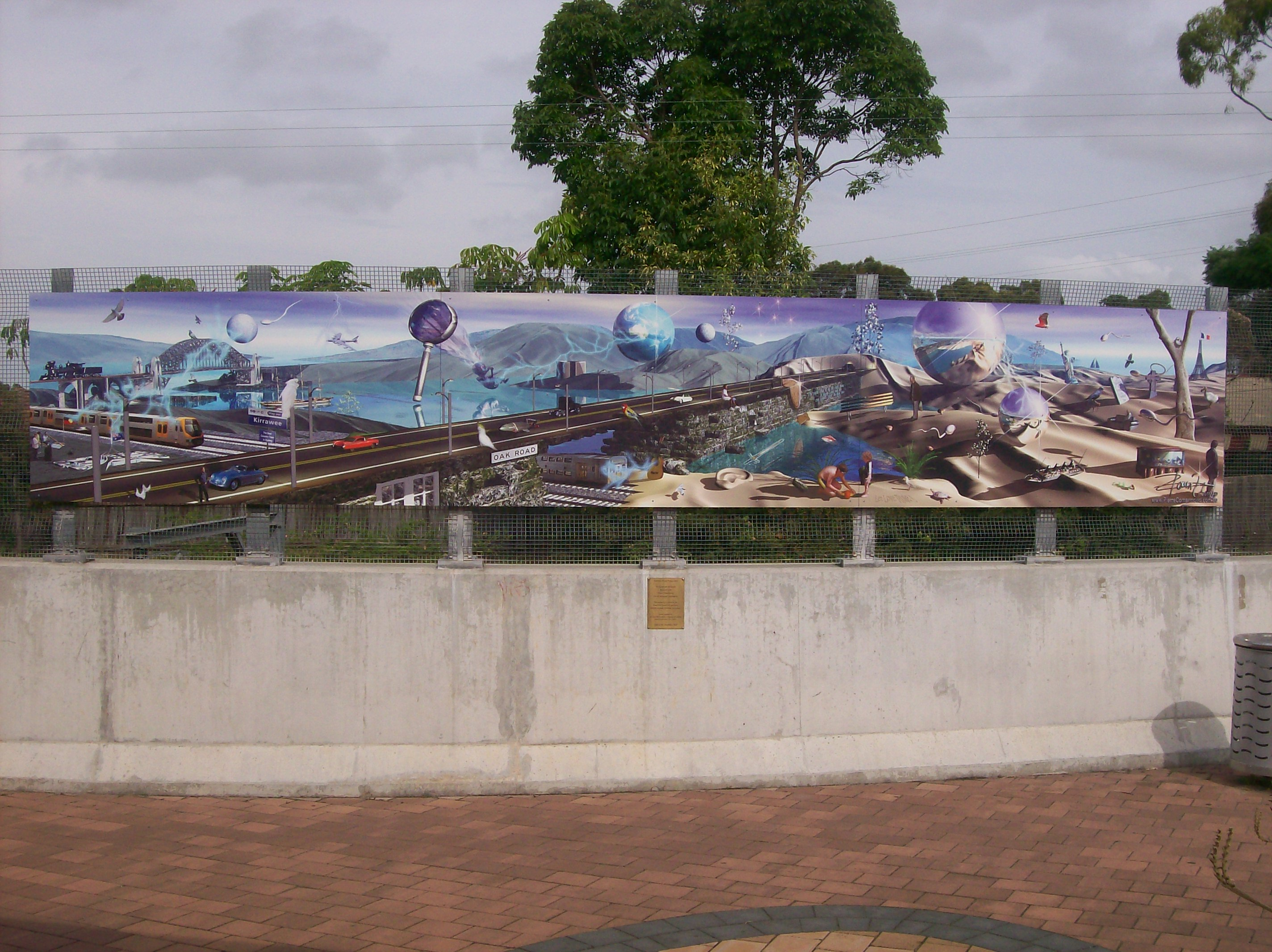
Artwork at the station in April 2012

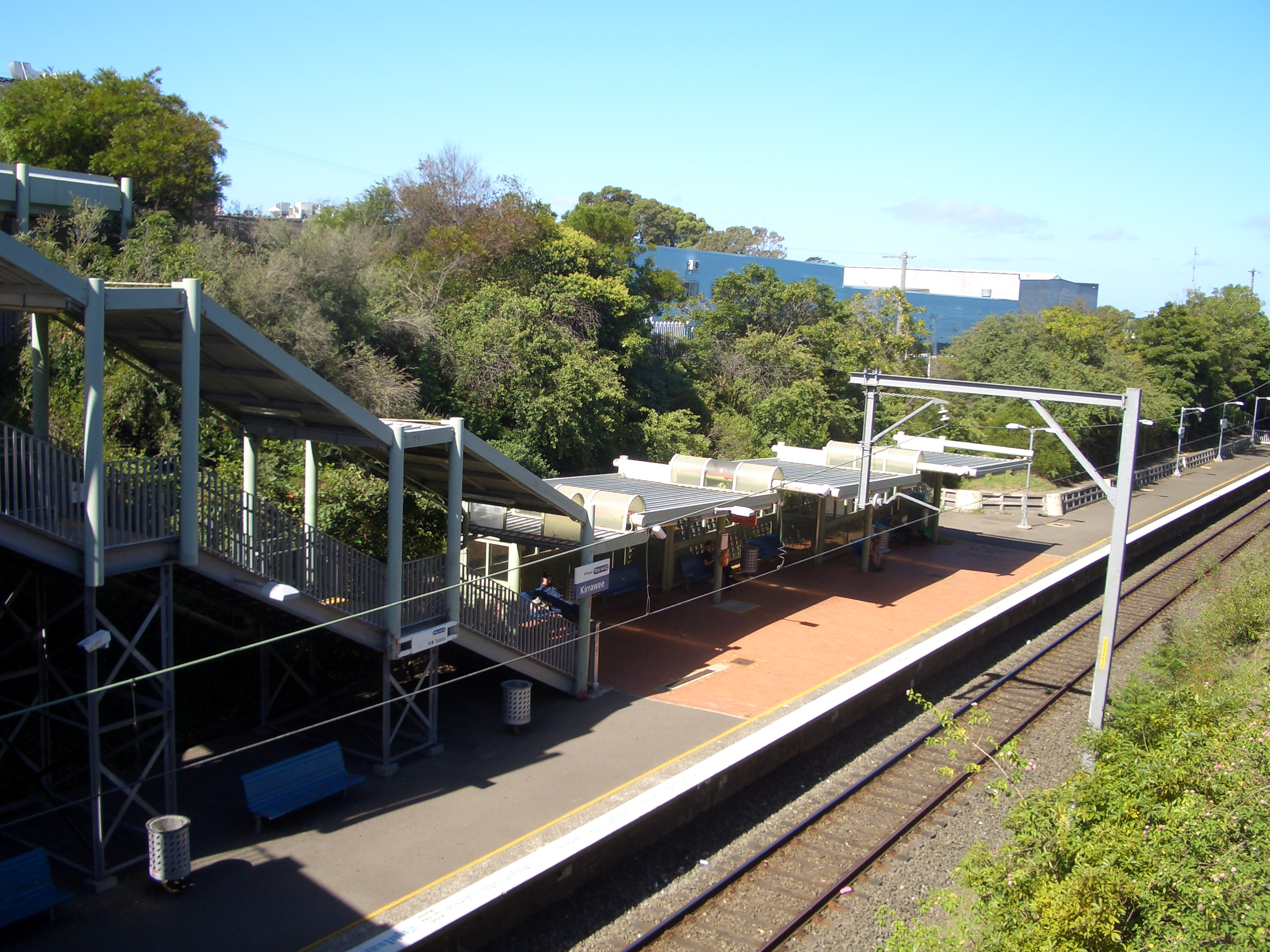
Kirrawee station before duplication works, January 2007
