= Woolooware railway station =

Railway station in Sydney, New South Wales, Australia

Woolooware
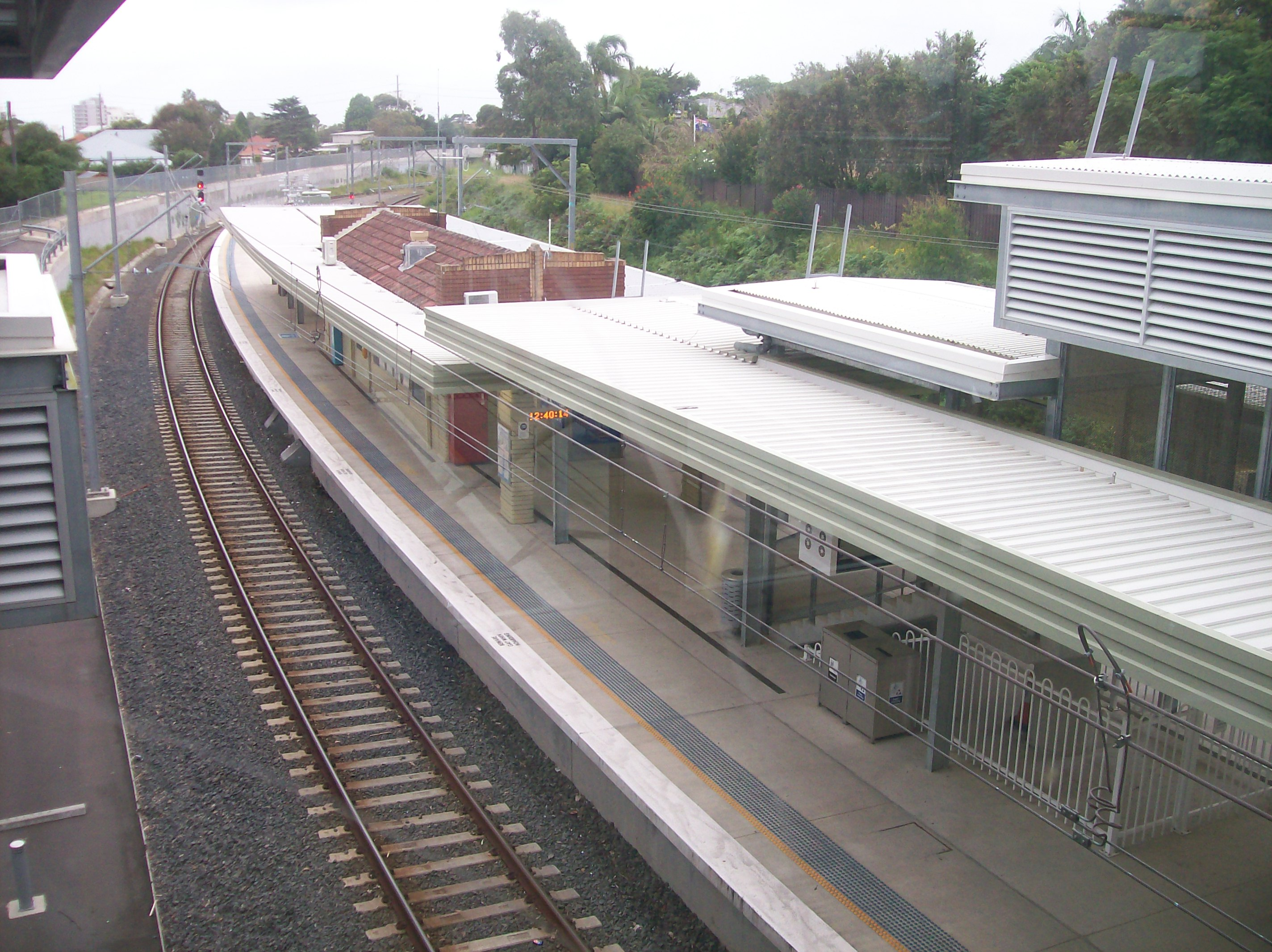
- Eastbound view of Platform 1 in April 2012

General information
- Location: Swan Street, Woolooware; Sydney, New South Wales; Australia
- Coordinates: 34°02′52″S 151°08′39″E
- Elevation: 33 metres (108 ft)
- Owner: Transport Asset Manager of NSW
- Operator: Sydney Trains
- Line: Cronulla
- Distance: 33.60 km (20.88 mi) from Central
- Platforms: 2 (1 island)
- Tracks: 2
- Connections: Bus

Construction
- Structure type: Ground
- Accessible: Yes

Other information
- Status: Weekdays: Staffed: 6am to 7pm: Weekends and public holidays: Staffed: 8am to 4pm
- Station code: WOE
- Website: Transport for NSW

History
- Opened: 16 December 1939 (86 years ago)
- Rebuilt: 2010 (16 years ago)
- Electrified: Yes (from opening)

Passengers
- 2023: 608,770 (year); 1,668 (daily) (Sydney Trains, NSW TrainLink)

Services
Preceding station	Sydney Trains	Following station
Cronulla Terminus	Eastern Suburbs & Illawarra Line	Caringbah towards Bondi Junction
Location

Woolooware railway station is a suburban railway station located on the Cronulla line, serving the Sydney suburb of Woolooware. It is served by Sydney Trains T4 Eastern Suburbs & Illawarra Line services.

== History ==
Woolooware station opened on 16 December 1939 when the Cronulla line opened from Sutherland to Cronulla. In April 2010, the line from Caringbah to Cronulla was duplicated which saw the side platform at Woolooware converted to an island platform as part of the Rail Clearways Program.

== Services ==
=== Platforms ===
Platform	Line	Stopping pattern	Notes
1	T4	services to Bondi Junction	Original platform
2	T4	services to Cronulla	New platform opened in 2010

=== Transport links ===
Woolooware station is served by one NightRide route:

- N11: Cronulla station to Town Hall station
