= Echoism =

Echoism may refer to:

- Echoism (trait), the opposite of narcissism
- The formation of words by imitating sounds, a form of onomatopoeia
- Echoism (facial symmetry), a theorised aspect of facial symmetry
