= Caringbah railway station =

Railway station in Sydney, New South Wales, Australia

Caringbah
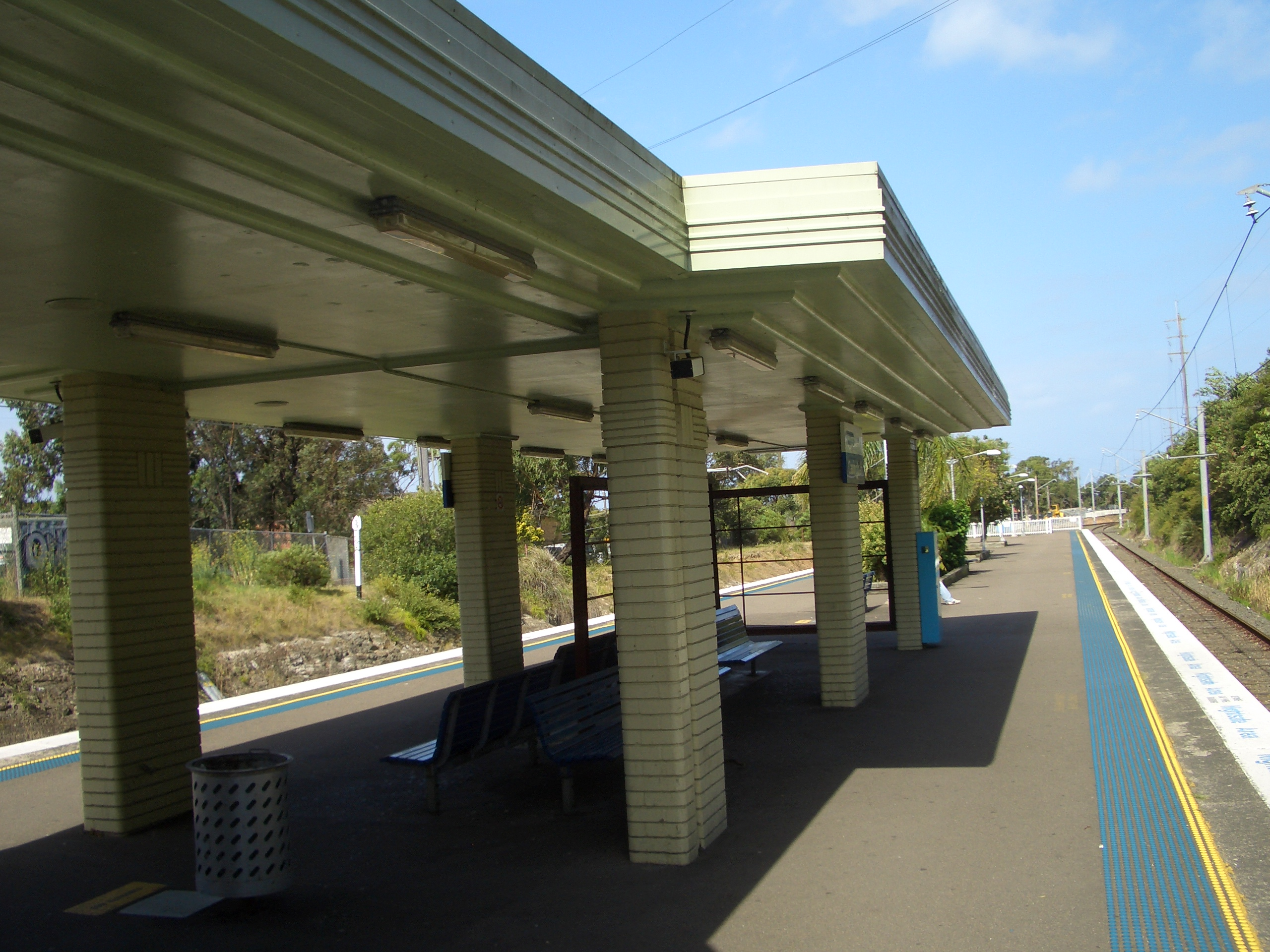
- Eastbound view from Platform 1 in January 2007

General information
- Location: The Kingsway, Caringbah; Sydney, New South Wales; Australia
- Coordinates: 34°02′29″S 151°07′20″E
- Elevation: 38 metres (125 ft)
- Owner: Transport Asset Manager of NSW
- Operator: Sydney Trains
- Line: Cronulla
- Distance: 31.51 km (19.58 mi) from Central
- Platforms: 2 (1 island)
- Tracks: 2
- Connections: Bus

Construction
- Structure type: Ground
- Accessible: Yes

Other information
- Status: Weekdays: Staffed: 6am to 7pm: Weekends and public holidays: Staffed: 8am to 4pm
- Station code: CIH
- Website: Transport for NSW

History
- Opened: 16 December 1939 (86 years ago)
- Electrified: Yes (from opening)

Passengers
- 2025: 1,308,468 (year); 3,585 (daily) (Sydney Trains)
- Rank: 108

Services
Preceding station	Sydney Trains	Following station
Woolooware towards Cronulla	Eastern Suburbs & Illawarra Line	Miranda towards Bondi Junction
Location

Caringbah railway station is a suburban railway station located on the Cronulla line, serving the Sydney suburb of Caringbah. It is served by Sydney Trains T4 Eastern Suburbs & Illawarra Line services.

== History ==
Caringbah station opened on 16 December 1939 when the Cronulla line opened from Sutherland to Cronulla. Caringbah was originally one of two stations on the single track, the other being Gymea.

On 15 July 1985, the line from Gymea to Caringbah was duplicated with a new track laid north of the existing single line.

In July 2001, an upgrade to the station was complete.

In April 2010, the rest of the line was duplicated.

== Services ==
=== Platforms ===
Platform	Line	Stopping pattern	Notes
1	T4	services to Bondi Junction	
2	T4	services to Cronulla	

=== Transport links ===
U-Go Mobility operates five bus routes via Caringbah station, under contract to Transport for NSW:

- 969: Sutherland station to Cronulla
- 971: Hurstville to South Cronulla
- 977: Westfield Miranda to Lilli Pilli
- 978: Westfield Miranda to Dolans Bay
- 988: Cronulla to Caringbah limited weekday service

Caringbah station is served by one NightRide route:

- N11: Cronulla station to Town Hall station
