= Eleutheromania =

Frantic zeal for freedom

Eleutheromania, or eleutherophilia is "a mania or frantic zeal for freedom". The term is sometimes used in a psychological context, likened to a mental disorder, such as John G. Robertson's definition as a mad zeal or irresistible craving for freedom. However, it is also sometimes used to simply mean a passion for liberty. Individuals espousing these ideals are called eleutheromaniacs. An antonym for the term is eleutherophobia. An individual that fears freedom is an eleutherophobe.
