= Echoism (trait) =

Echoism as a concept has been variously defined as the opposite of narcissism. Though the concept does not have a presence in academia, it is nonetheless discussed in popular psychology writings.

== Overview ==
The concept was popularized by Donna Savery in her self help book Echoism, The Silenced Response to Narcissism. In the book she accepts that the concept of echoism has gone "largely unrecognized" by academia, and her book was a way to counteract that. She views that Echoism serves as the psychological counterpart to narcissism and that typically, each narcissistic person has an echoistic partner and often several dependents. Craig Malkin wrote about the concept as well, stating in Psychology Today that an echoist's "defining characteristic is a fear of seeming narcissistic in any way." In his essay on echoism, Dean Davis stated that he hoped that "the psychoanalytic theory of echoism will prove most useful in developing a better understanding of these variations and any needed therapeutic techniques."

== See also ==
- Eleutheromania
