= Simple learning design 2.0 =

Simple Learning Design 2.0 (SLD 2.0) is a learning design specification proposed by Durand and Downes from the National Research Council of Canada in 2009. It was intended as an interoperability specification, simpler to implement than IMS Learning Design, a specification as of 2010 restricted only to pilot and research projects. IMS Learning Design is a specification for describing methods of learning design, in a way that claims to be pedagogically neutral. Simple Learning Design 2.0 was designed to be implemented by developers in a commercial e-learning application, and was intended to be paired with a more complex specification, described as "a real UML for learning design." The intent behind SLD 2.0 was to propose a specification with a good balance between its expressivity and the simplicity of its implementation.
