= Delta8-fatty-acid desaturase =

Identifiers
- EC no.: 1.14.19.4

Databases
- IntEnz: IntEnz view
- BRENDA: BRENDA entry
- ExPASy: NiceZyme view
- KEGG: KEGG entry
- MetaCyc: metabolic pathway
- PRIAM: profile
- PDB structures: RCSB PDB PDBe PDBsum
Search
- PMC: articles
- PubMed: articles
- NCBI: proteins

Delta8-fatty-acid desaturase (EC 1.14.19.4, Delta8-sphingolipid desaturase, EFD1, BoDES8, SLD, Delta8 fatty acid desaturase, Delta8-desaturase) is an enzyme with systematic name phytosphinganine,hydrogen donor:oxygen Delta8-oxidoreductase. This enzyme catalyses the following chemical reaction

phytosphinganine + reduced acceptor + O_{2} $\rightleftharpoons$ Delta8-phytosphingenine + acceptor + 2 H_{2}O

This enzyme, which has been found mainly in plants, introduces a double bond at Delta8 of C18 and C20 fatty acids.
