= Cronulla railway line =

Railway line in Sydney, New South Wales, Australia

Cronulla line
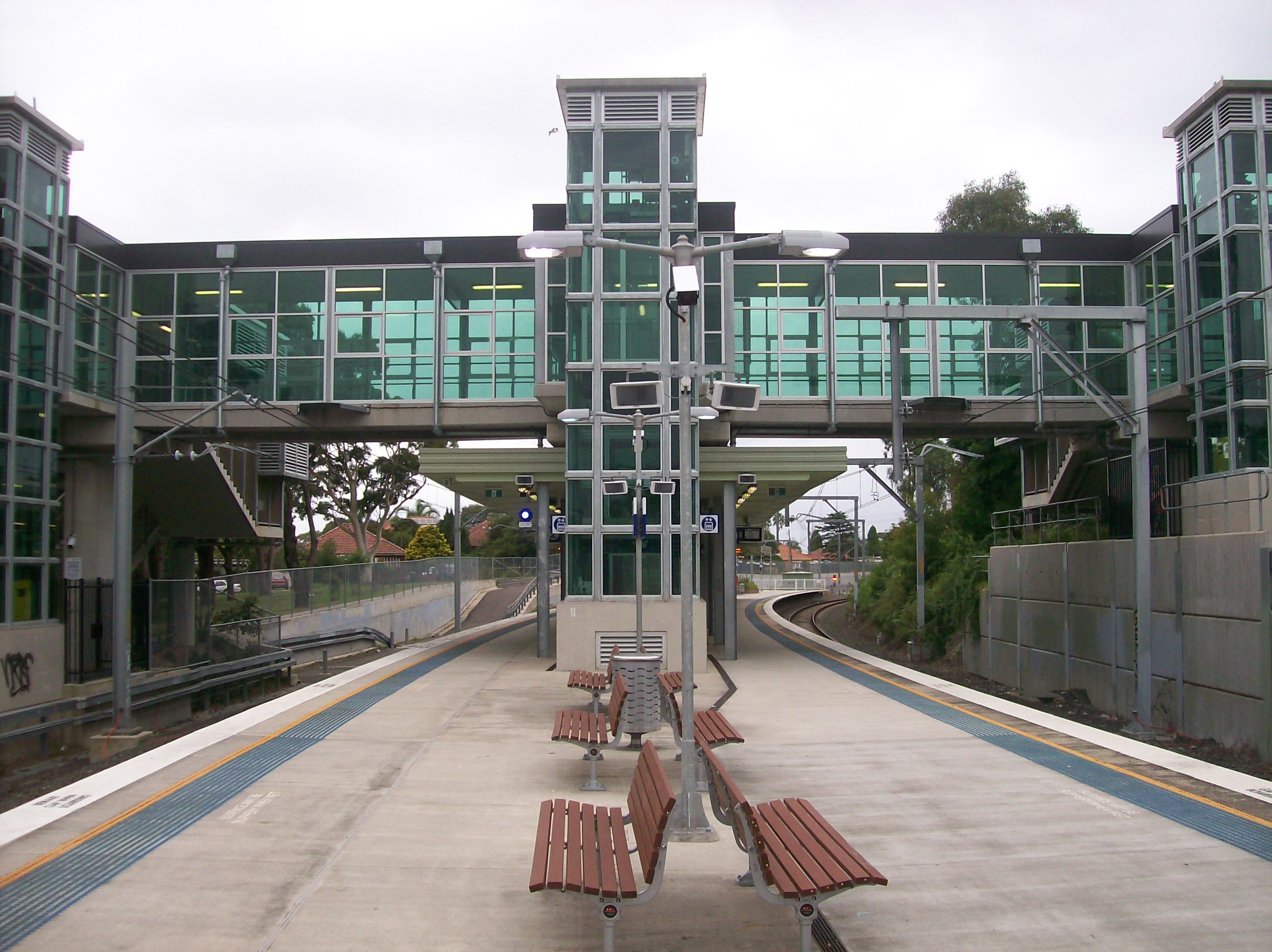
- View of the duplicated Cronulla line as it runs through Woolooware, heading towards Cronulla.

Overview
- Owner: Transport Asset Manager of New South Wales
- Termini: Sutherland; Cronulla
- Stations: 7

Service
- Services: Eastern Suburbs & Illawarra Line
- Operator: Sydney Trains
- Depot: Mortdale
- Rolling stock: T set

History
- Opened: 16 December 1939; 86 years ago

Technical
- Line length: 10.17 km (6.32 mi)
- Track gauge: 1,435 mm (4 ft 8 1/2 in) standard gauge

The Cronulla railway line is a suburban branch line serving the southern suburbs of Sydney, New South Wales, Australia. Sydney Trains operates electric passenger train services over the line as part of its Eastern Suburbs & Illawarra Line.

== Description of route ==
The line branches off the Illawarra railway line immediately south of Sutherland station, with a sharp turn towards the east. Due to sharpness of this curve, trains are limited to 55 km/h (34 mph) and noise walls have been built on both sides of the line to reduce noise levels for local residents. It is double track throughout, with all stations having island platforms, except Cronulla. Cronulla station has a long platform (which is numbered as two platforms) capable of holding two eight-car trains, and three stabling sidings. The entire line is controlled from Sydenham Signalling Centre and is equipped with standard NSW double colour light signals.

The line is not designed for freight trains, so operation of freight trains is normally not permitted. However, 81, 82, BL, C, G, GL, RL, VL class locomotives may be used for line maintenance. These trains are restricted to 30–40 km/h (19–25 mph) over bridges and 50 km/h (31 mph) elsewhere on the line. Regular passenger trains operate to speed signs on the line, with limits varying between 45 and 100 km/h (28 and 62 mph).

== History ==
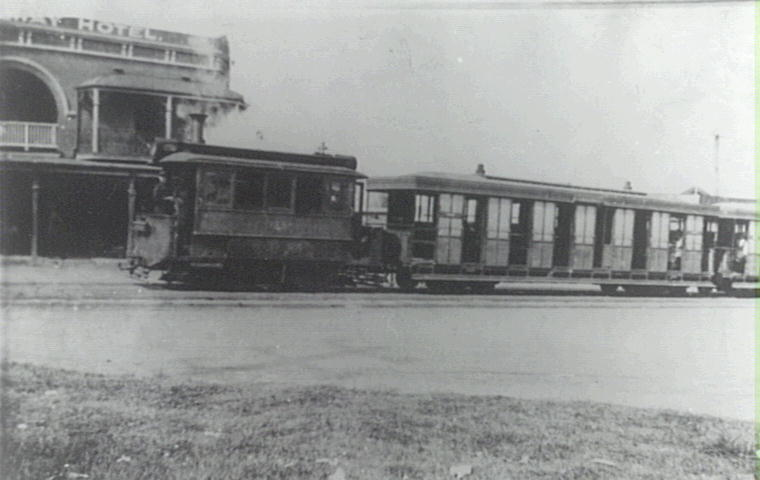
The steam tram to Cronulla stands outside the hotel in Sutherland c. 1920s

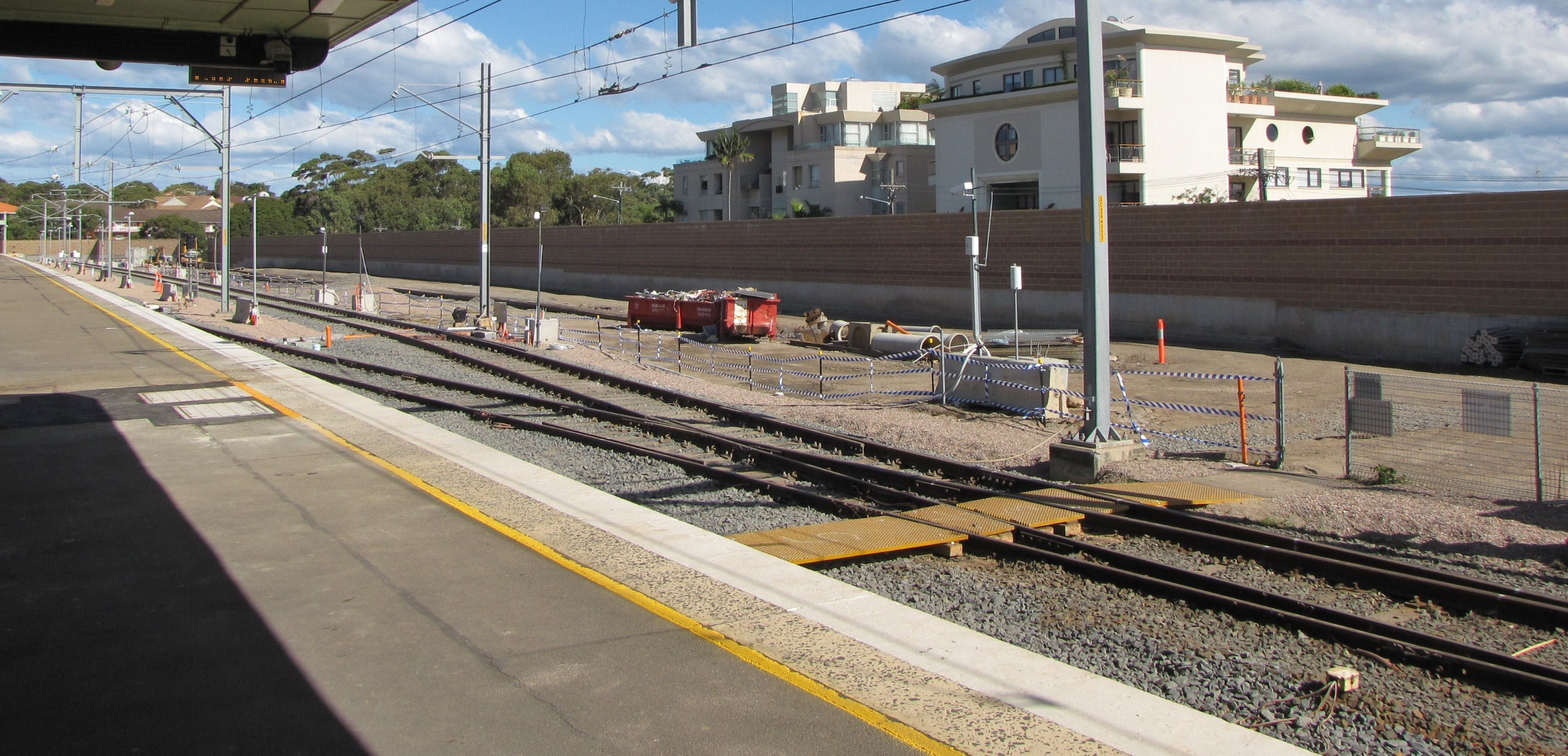
The double length platform on Cronulla station was built to cope with large holiday crowds. The platform was originally designed to accommodate five trains

A "Sutherland-Cronulla Tramway League" was formed towards the end of 1900, and they forwarded a petition to Parliament urging the construction of a tramway in the area. The suggested route commenced at the southern end of Sutherland station, proceeded north-east to the Princes Highway, east along the Kingsway, then south past the site of the present rail terminus to Shelly Park in the centre of Cronulla. Approved by the Parliamentary Subcommittee on Public Works in 1908, the single track line, with four stations and a goods siding, was opened on 12 June 1911 at a cost of £37,505.

By 1932, the Cronulla tramway had closed. Competing bus services had begun to run with unrestricted competition, and the tram line by this time was so full with services that trams often ran late due to holdups at the crossing loops and passengers missed their connections at Sutherland. The line suffered large losses in its later years, and the effect of the Great Depression forced it to cease its services, the last passenger service operating on 3 August 1931. The goods service continued until 12 January of the next year.

Although the closure of the tramway allowed planning to go ahead for a railway, the planning for the replacement railway line suffered various delays in the 1930s due to funding issues: the line's construction competed with a proposal to electrify the Illawarra line to Waterfall, and there were disputes over the point at which the line would connect to the main line. Two early proposals to join the line at Como and north of Sutherland Station were rejected. Local residents were also concerned that the railway would increase Council rates in the Cronulla area. Despite the delays, Parliament finally gave approval to the line on 2 March 1936, and a route with five new stations was surveyed that would connect with the main line at the southern side of Sutherland station. The new line was opened on 16 December 1939 by the Governor, Baron Wakehurst at a large ceremony at Cronulla station. The line was electrified from its opening date.

Although crossing loops were installed at Caringbah and Gymea stations when the line was opened, the single track line prevented the expansion of services to the Cronulla peninsula, and so in the 1980s it was decided to duplicate a 3.5-kilometre (2.2 mi) section of the line between Gymea and Caringbah, with Gymea. Miranda and Caringbah all receiving island platforms. The new section was opened on 15 July 1985. In the 2000s, as part of the Rail Clearways Program, the two remaining single track sections were duplicated. Woolooware and Kirrawee stations were upgraded, Cronulla yard reconfigured and the branch line resignaled. The new track opened on 19 April 2010.

A proposed railway station near Sutherland Hospital has been discussed in the community. A 2002 joint study between Sutherland Shire Council and the State Rail Authority was rejected, and was said to cost about $35 million. In 2014, a proposal for the station costing $20 million was designed which included two side platforms, street access and a direct ramp to the hospital, and involve an additional minute travel time. In December 2014, the Sutherland Shire Council again asked the Government of New South Wales to consider building such a station.
