= Cronulla railway station =

Railway station in Sydney, Australia

Cronulla
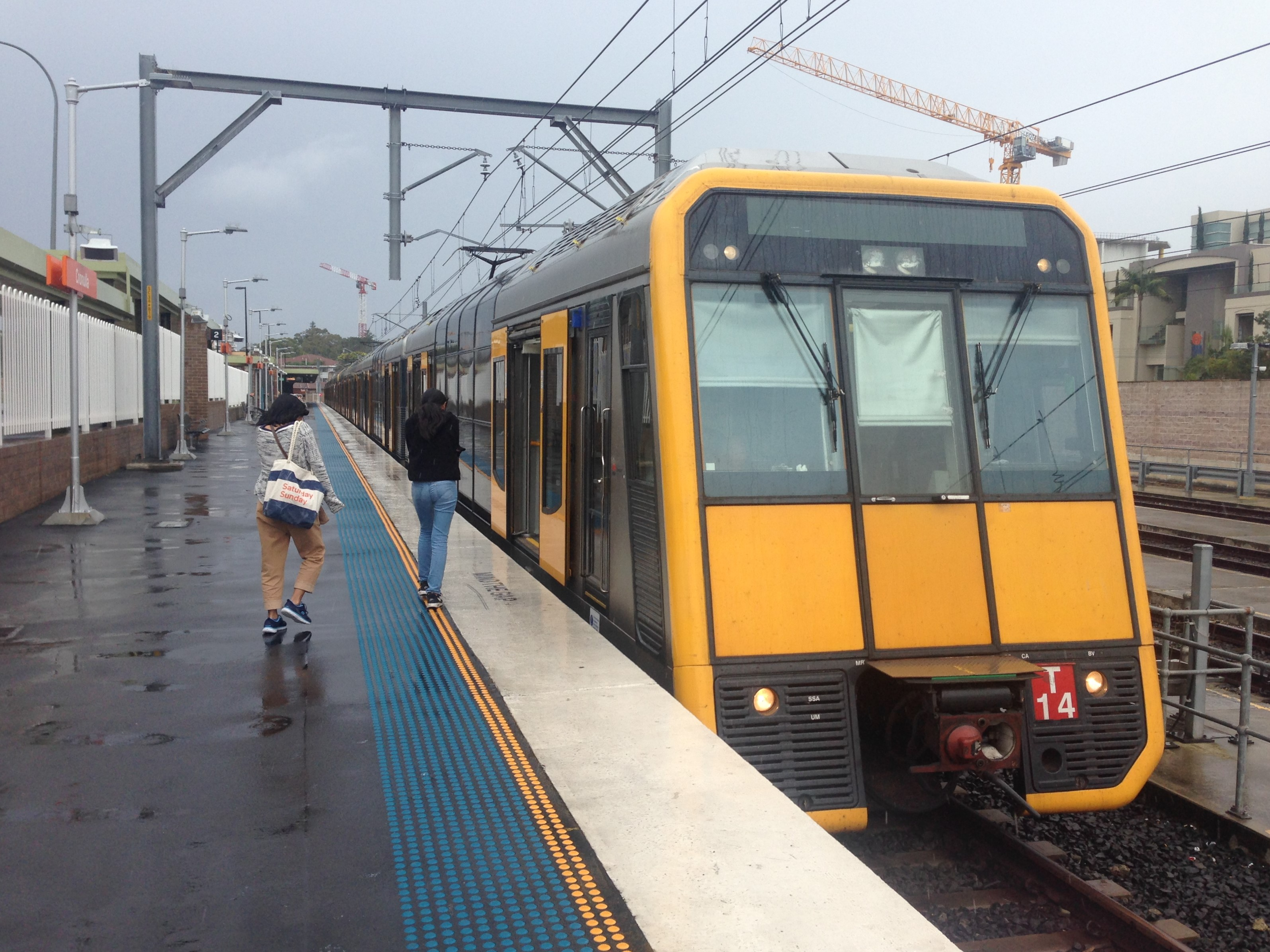
- T set waiting at Cronulla railway station in May 2019

General information
- Location: Cronulla Street, Cronulla; Sydney, New South Wales; Australia
- Coordinates: 34°03′20″S 151°09′05″E
- Elevation: 13 metres (43 ft)
- Owner: Transport Asset Manager of NSW
- Operator: Sydney Trains
- Line: Cronulla
- Distance: 34.81 km (21.63 mi) from Central
- Platforms: 2 (1 side)
- Tracks: 4
- Connections: Bus

Construction
- Structure type: Ground
- Accessible: Yes

Other information
- Status: Staffed
- Station code: CNL
- Website: Transport for NSW

History
- Opened: 16 December 1939 (86 years ago)
- Electrified: Yes (from opening)

Passengers
- 2025: 1,459,580 (year); 3,999 (daily) (Sydney Trains)
- Rank: 100

Services
Preceding station	Sydney Trains	Following station
Terminus	Eastern Suburbs & Illawarra Line	Woolooware towards Bondi Junction

New South Wales Heritage Register
- Official name: Cronulla Railway Station group
- Type: State heritage (complex / group)
- Designated: 2 April 1999
- Reference no.: 1123
- Type: Railway Platform / Station
- Category: Transport – Rail
- Builders: NSW Department of Railways
Location

Cronulla railway station is a heritage-listed suburban railway station and the terminus of the Cronulla line, serving the Sydney suburb of Cronulla. It was designed and built by the NSW Department of Railways during 1939. It is also known as Cronulla Railway Station group. The property was added to the New South Wales State Heritage Register on 2 April 1999.

The station is served by Sydney Trains T4 Eastern Suburbs & Illawarra Line services. The station is unusual in that the two platforms are situated end to end, rather than side by side, making it the second longest rail platform in New South Wales, after Albury.

== History ==
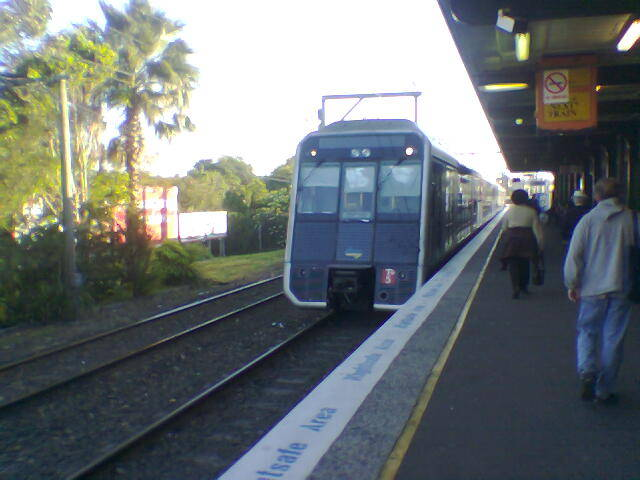
T set at Cronulla in 2005

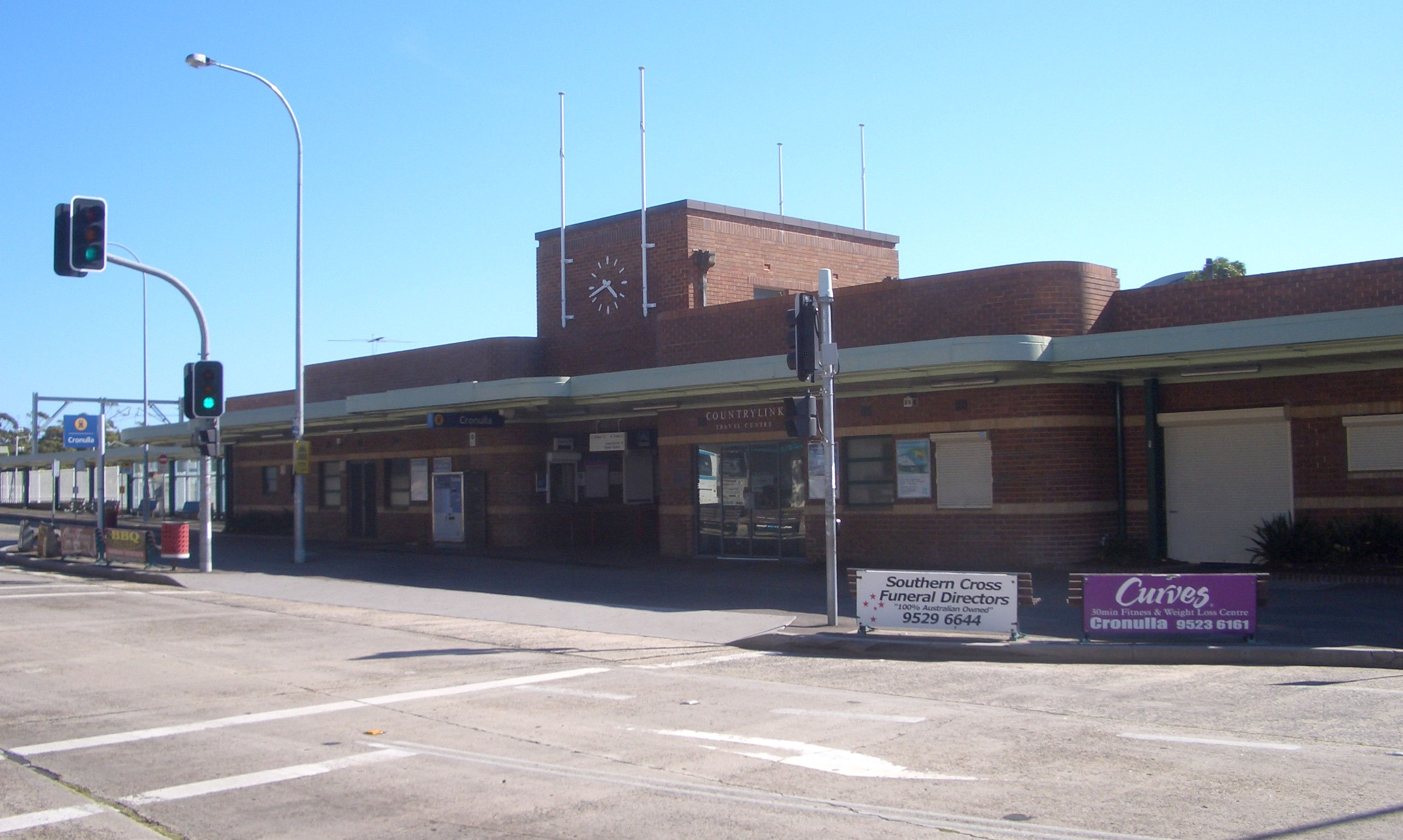
Station front in January 2007

Thomas Holt (1811–88) owned most of the land that stretched from Sutherland to Cronulla in the 1860s. Holt built Sutherland House on the foreshore of Gwawley Bay in 1818, on the eastern side of Sylvania. After the Illawarra railway line was built to Sutherland in 1885, the area became popular for picnics and swimming. Many regulars rented beach houses at Cronulla every year for holidays. The Cronulla area was subdivided in 1895 and land was offered for sale at A£10 per acre. In 1899, the government named the area Gunnamatta, which means "sandy hills". The municipality of Sutherland Shire was proclaimed on 15 March 1906, and the Post Office reopened in 1907. On 26 February 1908 it was officially changed to Cronulla and Gunnamatta was used for the name of the bay, on the western side. The first public school opened in 1910. In 1908, the NSW Government had approved construction of a steam tram route from Sutherland to Cronulla, with construction completed and steam trams operating along the route from 12 June 1911. The area remained mostly semi rural in the inter-war period. After World War II there was a large population increase and the area was suburbanised from the 1950s, with many of the guest houses being replaced by high rise flats.

The Sutherland-Cronulla line was constructed from 1936 and completed in 1939, under the NSW premiership of the conservative Sir Bertram Stevens. In 1936 the NSW Parliament authorised expenditure of A£300,000 to construct the Sutherland to Cronulla railway line, with the men employed to receive award wages "in pursuance of the Cabinet's policy of replacing unemployment relief works by works that will provide a better return for the expenditure of public money, and at the same time create improved conditions of employment." A federal loan for "state works" including "speeding up of the construction of the Sutherland-Cronulla line" was granted to the NSW government in November 1938. The Cronulla line replaced the steam tramway. A single track railway line replaced the tram service, opening on 16 December 1939.

As part of the Cronulla line, five suburban railway stations with Inter-war Functionalist style platform buildings were constructed from Kirrawee to Woolooware (Kirrawee since demolished), and Sutherland Railway Station rebuilt with a pair of Inter-war Functionalist style platform buildings. Cronulla, as the terminus of the line, was regarded as the most important station on the line, and was officially opened on 16 December 1939 by the NSW Governor Lord Wakehurst. The Cronulla terminus was unlike any other railway terminus due to the very long single side loading platform designed to take two full length electric trains end to end. Cronulla was a major tourist resort, and the railway station was constructed close to the ocean beach. The design of the station allowed large crowds to move quickly in and out of the trains and off the platform. A goods siding closed in 1949.

The Cronulla line was constructed as an electrified railway line, and was the first major use of a miniaturised relay locking system using electrical relays for electric light signalling for sections of the line (known as the electro- pneumatic system). Under the Rail Clearways Program, the two remaining single track sections of the Cronulla line were duplicated in 2010. As a result, train stabling west of Cronulla was replaced by stabling sidings opposite platform 2. Cronulla has the second longest platform in New South Wales, after Albury.

== Description ==
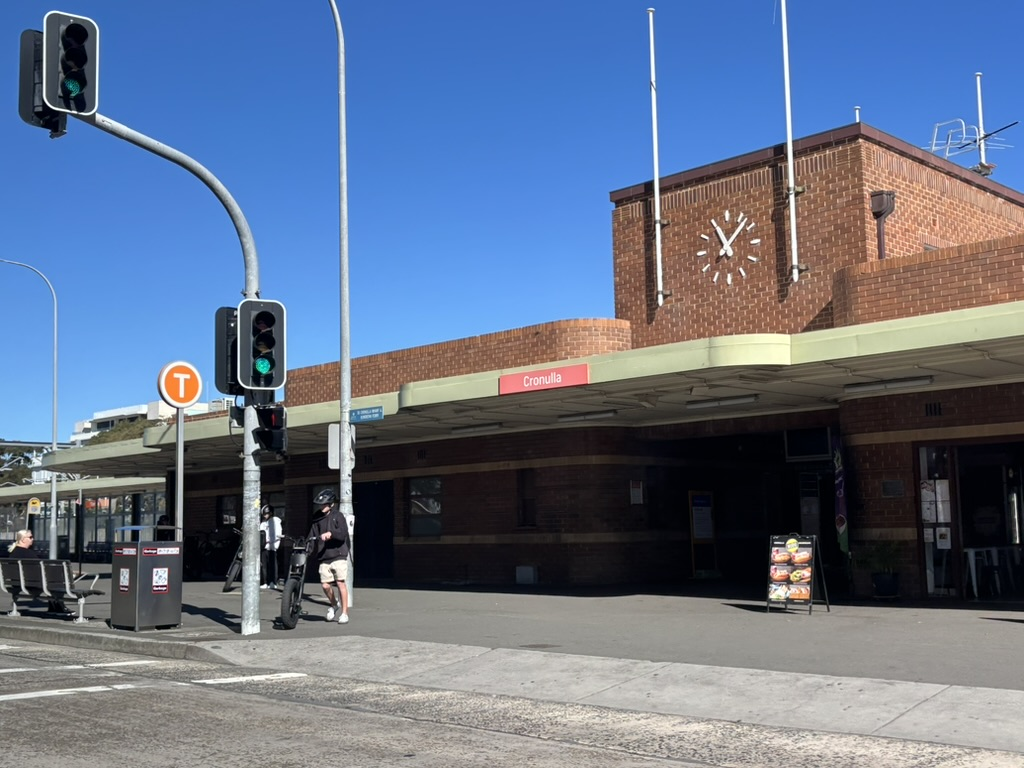
Cronulla Railway Station as of July 2025

The station complex comprises, from south to north, a freestanding brick wall with platform awning and brick ticket booth/entry building, erected in 1939; a brick ticket booth/entry building, erected in 1939; a type 13 main platform building, erected in 1939; and the platform, erected in 1939. The surrounding landscape includes planting beds, embankment plantings, and Monro Park opposite on east. Moveable items include the railway clock to platform; two plaques; and timber roll-over indicator boards.

Context

Cronulla Railway Station fronts Cronulla Street on the eastern side and was originally entered via three separate entry points along Cronulla Street, each with a 1939 structure. The station has a very long perimeter platform. The main platform building is located towards the northern end of the railway station. The station has some planting beds along the Cronulla Street elevation, and also a railway embankment planting to the western side of the railway tracks. The station is also located opposite Monro Park in Cronulla Street. There is a low brick retaining wall along the Cronulla street side of the platform, above which modern powder coated aluminium fencing has been installed.

Freestanding brick wall with platform awning and ticket booth/entry building, erected in 1939

A freestanding brick wall with two contrasting soldier courses, and a brick entry building towards its southern end, which features a cantilevered platform awning with steel posts and curved corners. The awning ceiling has the same stepped profile as the awning ceiling to the main platform building. The brick entry building also has curved corners and 2 contrasting soldier courses.

Entry building/ticket booth, erected in 1939

This is a freestanding brick entry building/ticket booth with curved corners, a low soldier course in contrasting brickwork, and steel framed windows with 2 horizontal glazing bars. It is located opposite (west of) the intersection of Laycock Avenue and Cronulla Street.

Main platform building, erected in 1939

This is an asymmetrically proportioned brick building, a dramatic and imposing composition of Inter-war Functionalist style design with great visual impact to both the Cronulla Street (east) and platform (west) elevations. The building has 8 stepped bays with shallow pitched gabled roofs hidden behind parapets, curved corners, two soldier courses in contrasting brickwork, curved awnings to both the street and platform elevations of the building, and a flat roofed clock tower facing Cronulla Street. All brickwork is tuck pointed.

A series of stepped, cantilevered steel awnings to the street elevation, including bus shelters at the southern end on the Cronulla Street elevation, add to the architectural interest of the building. The main platform building entrance area is particularly well defined by two sweeping curved walls of bull nosed bricks forming a covered passageway. This entry area has a decorative Art Deco style plaster ceiling with heavily moulded cornices featuring an ocean wave motif, and features a freestanding brick ticket booth with rollover timber indicator board. The station entry area also features a brass plaque commemorating the official opening of the station in 1939.

The building has original steel framed awning windows placed in groups of three vertically and flywire fanlights. There are many original timber perimeter beaded doors. There are cantilevered steel posts with concrete bases to the platform awning. The awning ceiling has fluorescent strip lighting. There is a luggage store door bricked up. On the Cronulla Street (east) side of the main platform building there are some modern aluminium framed windows, and modern glazed doors with roller shutters. The Countrylink Travel Centre located to the north of the entry area on the street (east) elevation has modern aluminium framed glazed doors. At the far northern end of the building, opening onto both the platform and the street, is a shop, which is contained within the curved northern end of the building. There are original flat concrete awnings over the shop entry and the window on the street side of the shop. There is a 1989 plaque on the Cronulla Street (east) side, near the station entry, to commemorate the 50th anniversary of Cronulla Station unveiled by the Hon. Bruce Baird the then-minister for transport on 16 December 1989.

The interior of the building comprises a complex arrangement of discrete spaces that are defined by the curving walls of each bay, resulting in asymmetrical and unusually proportioned rooms. These spaces comprise (from north to south): a men's toilet, store room, ladies' toilet, ladies' waiting room (now a staff room), signal equipment room, general waiting room, booking hall (entrance), booking office, Station Master's office, public waiting area, parcels office, traffic staff room and drivers room. The final bay (northern end) is let as a shop. Cronulla Station retains a significant proportion of original interior fit out. Although some fit out has been removed, the bulk of interior joinery, doors and window frames have been retained along with the original signalling/track switching gear, which is still in everyday use. The waiting room has original seating. Interior ceilings to the shop at the far northern end of the main platform building are original.

Platform, erected in 1939

A single very long platform with an asphalt surface and concrete edges. The platform is the second longest in NSW.

Modern canopies

There are two separate modern cantilevered canopies on steel posts on the Cronulla Street (east) side of the station, towards the southern end, off the station platform.

Landscape/Natural features

There are planting beds on both east and west sides of the station, with linear exotic planting on the rail embankment including palm trees. The visual setting includes Monro Park opposite on the east. The original building was planned with extensive gardens to the street elevation, however 1943 aerial photos do not show extensive planting.

Moveable items

- Double-faced clock mounted on a cast iron wall bracket on the platform (west) elevation of the main platform building;
- Plaque within entry area to main platform building to commemorate the 1939 official opening of the station;
- Plaque on east elevation of main platform building, near entry area, to commemorate the 50th anniversary of Cronulla Station, unveiled by the Hon. Bruce Baird on 16 December 1989;
- Timber roll-over indicator boards attached to the entry area ticket booth in the Main platform building.

=== Condition ===
The freestanding brick wall with platform awning and brick entry building is in good condition. The brick entry building/ticket booth is also in good condition. Also in good condition are the main platform building, the platform, the surrounding landscape, and the moveable items.

Cronulla Railway Station is remarkably intact. The station buildings and structures have retained a high degree of integrity externally and a moderate degree of integrity internally.

=== Modifications and dates ===
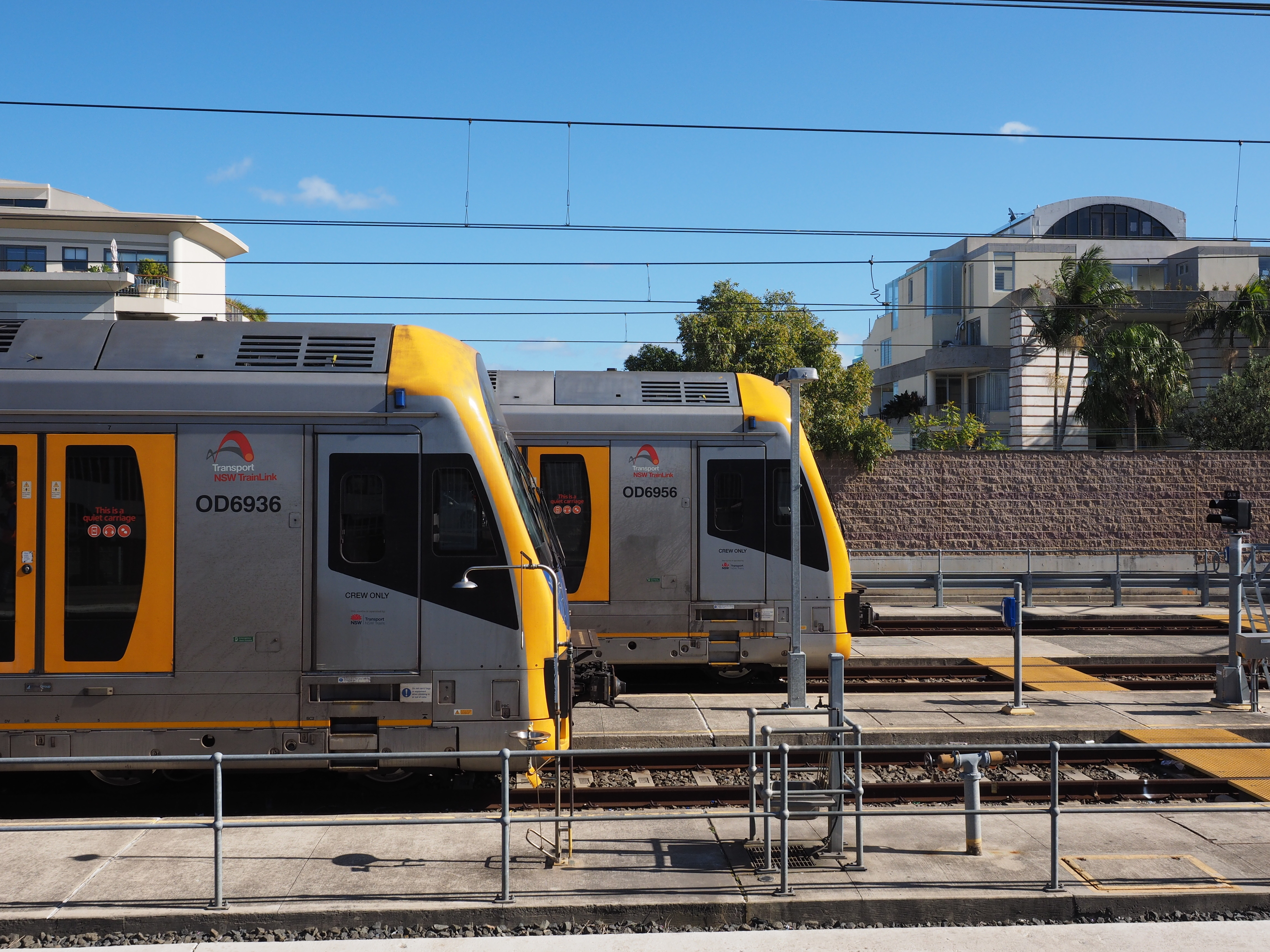
Two trains in the stabling sidings at Cronulla railway station during 2017

- 1949 – Goods yard closed
- 1952 – Goods shed demolished
- 1953 – Milk Bar/Kiosk and brick screen wall added
- c. 1970 – Some interior re-fitting
- 1995 – Timber catenary supports replaced with steel
- N.d – Bus shelter awnings south of the main platform building, which are located off the platform, on the Cronulla Street frontage east of the platform; Countrylink Centre fitout; some replacement of original steel framed windows with aluminium framed windows.

== Services ==
=== Platforms ===
Platform	Line	Stopping pattern	Notes
1	T4	services to & from Bondi Junction	
2	T4	services to & from Bondi Junction	

=== Transport links ===
U-Go Mobility operates five bus routes via Cronulla station, under contract to Transport for NSW:

- 969: to Sutherland station
- 971: to Hurstville
- 985: to Westfield Miranda via Woolooware Bay
- 987: to Kurnell
- 988: to Caringbah station limited weekday service

Cronulla station is served by one NightRide route:

- N11: to Town Hall station

Cronulla & National Park Ferry Cruises operates one ferry route to and from Bundeena.

== Trackplan ==
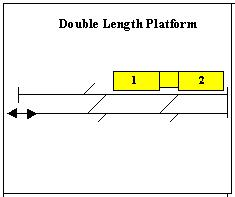
Cronulla station in single line days had a double length platform

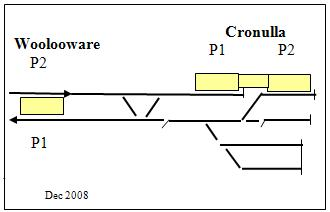
Cronulla station in double line days

== Heritage listing ==
As at 18 October 2010, Cronulla Railway Station – inclusive of its 1939 platform and platform buildings, identified moveable items and landscaping – is of State heritage significance. Cronulla Railway Station is of historical significance as a major 1930s Depression period NSW government public works project, and through its relationship to the development of the suburb of Cronulla. Cronulla Railway Station is of aesthetic significance as the major terminus station on the 1939 Cronulla line, the importance of which is reflected in the size, design and high architectural quality of the railway station's collection of outstanding Inter-war Functionalist style railway buildings. Cronulla Railway Station is rare within the NSW rail network, and considered to be one of the finest examples of Inter-war Functionalist style railway station architecture in NSW. The platform buildings are noted for their use of dichromatic brickwork, parapeted roofs, curved corners, strong horizontal planes, stepped steel awnings, complex brickwork, decorative features and complex geometric massing. The station is further noted for its cohesion as a precinct with several individual elements and its overall degree of integrity. Cronulla Railway Station has a dramatic street facade to Cronulla Street with a unique central clock tower which also houses electric signalling equipment. Cronulla Railway Station is of high technical significance for its ability to demonstrate design and construction techniques of the mid-20th century.

Cronulla railway station was listed on the New South Wales State Heritage Register on 2 April 1999 having satisfied the following criteria.

The place is important in demonstrating the course, or pattern, of cultural or natural history in New South Wales.

Cronulla Railway Station is of state historical significance as the major terminus station on the 1939 Cronulla line, the importance of which is reflected in the size and fine architecture of the railway station. Cronulla Railway Station is also of historical significance as a major 1930s Depression period NSW government public works project, and through its relationship to the development of the suburb of Cronulla.

The place is important in demonstrating aesthetic characteristics and/or a high degree of creative or technical achievement in New South Wales.

Cronulla Railway Station is of state aesthetic significance as a collection of outstanding Inter-War Functionalist railway station buildings and structures considered to be the finest in the NSW railway network. The buildings are noted for their use of dichromatic brickwork, parapeted roofs, curved corners, strong horizontal planes, stepped steel awnings, complex brickwork, decorative features and complex geometric massing. The station is further noted for its cohesion as a precinct with several original elements and its overall degree of integrity. Cronulla Railway Station has a dramatic street façade to Cronulla Street with a unique central clock tower which also houses electric signalling equipment.

The place has a strong or special association with a particular community or cultural group in New South Wales for social, cultural or spiritual reasons.

The place has the potential to contribute to the local community's sense of place, and can provide a connection to the local community's past.

The place has potential to yield information that will contribute to an understanding of the cultural or natural history of New South Wales.

Cronulla Railway Station is of high technical significance for its ability to demonstrate design and construction techniques of the mid-20th century and for its ability to demonstrate the use of the Inter-War Functionalist style for a railway station.

The place possesses uncommon, rare or endangered aspects of the cultural or natural history of New South Wales.

Cronulla Railway Station is rare as an outstanding example of Inter-War Functionalist railway station architecture, considered to be the finest in NSW.

The place is important in demonstrating the principal characteristics of a class of cultural or natural places/environments in New South Wales.

Cronulla Railway Station is an example of Inter-War Functionalist style railway station architecture, both on the Cronulla line and in the NSW Railways network as a whole.

== See also ==
- List of Sydney Trains railway stations
