= Gymea Bay =

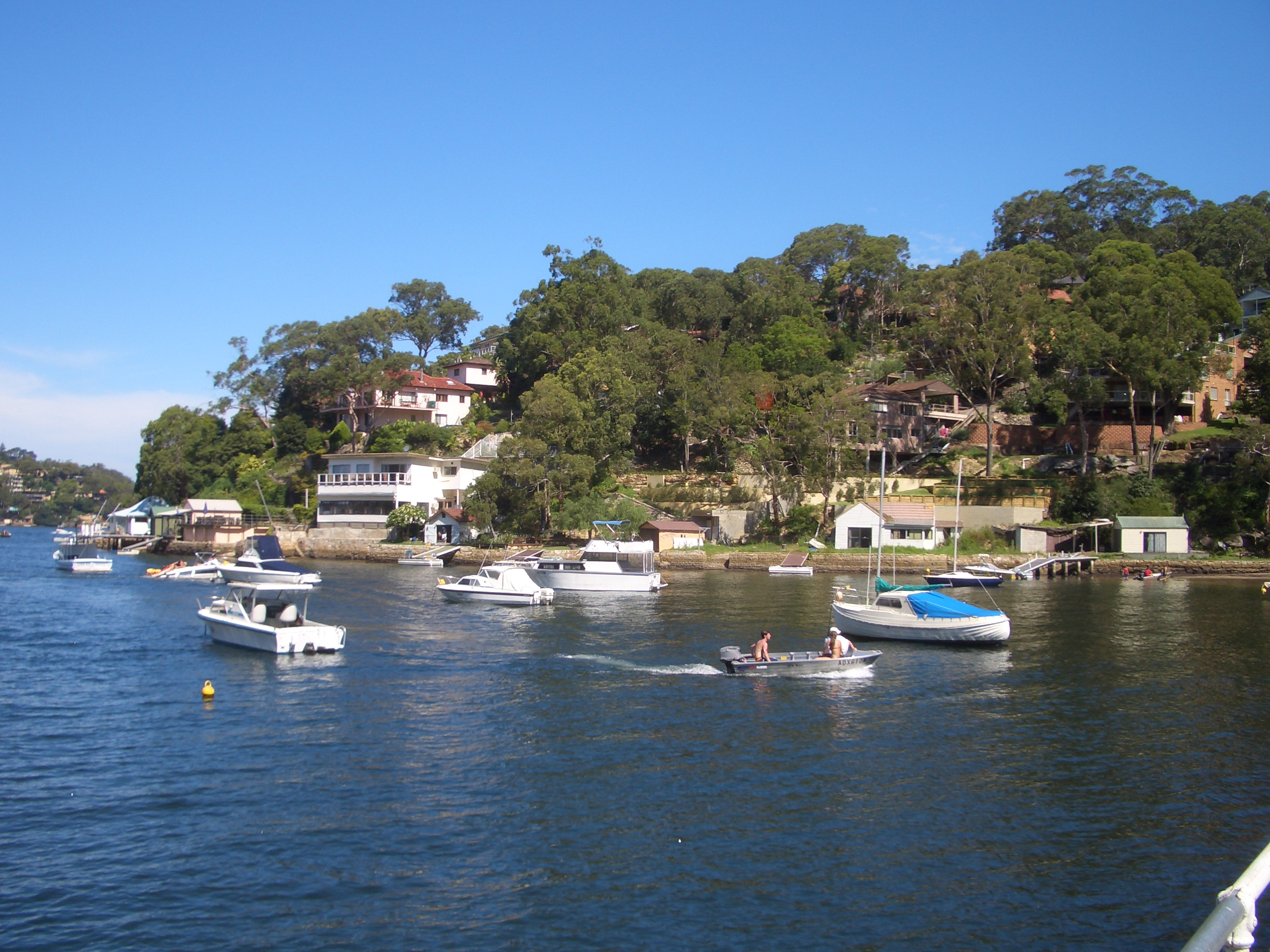
- The bay of Gymea Bay

- Location of Gymea Bay in New South Wales
- Location: Southern Sydney, New South Wales
- Coordinates: 34°02′55″S 151°06′04″E
- Type: Bay
- Primary inflows: Coonong Creek
- Primary outflows: Port Hacking River
- Basin countries: Australia
- Frozen: never
- Settlements: Gymea Bay, Gymea

The Gymea Bay is a bay on the upper estuarine Port Hacking River, fed by the Coonong Creek in southern Sydney, in the state of New South Wales, Australia

== Location and features ==
The bay, the locality, suburb of Gymea Bay and the adjacent suburb of Gymea, were named after the Gymea Lily Doryanthes excelsa, a tall perennial (up to 6m) that is prevalent in the area. The plant was called "Gymea" by the local Eora people and became the inspiration for the suburb's name, by government surveyor W.A.B. Geaves in 1855. The Gymea Lily has been adopted as a symbol of the area and features on the crest of many local organisations. Development in the area has eradicated most of these lilies but some can still be found, a few kilometres south in the Royal National Park.

== Recreation ==
Gymea Bay is home to the heritage-listed Gymea Bay Baths, at the shore of Gymea Bay Baths Reserve at the intersection of Gymea Bay Road and Ellesmere Road. Gymea Bay Amateur Swimming Club has been using the baths for over 40 years. The bay and Port Hacking estuary are used extensively for watersports such as wakeboarding and water skiing.

== Gallery ==
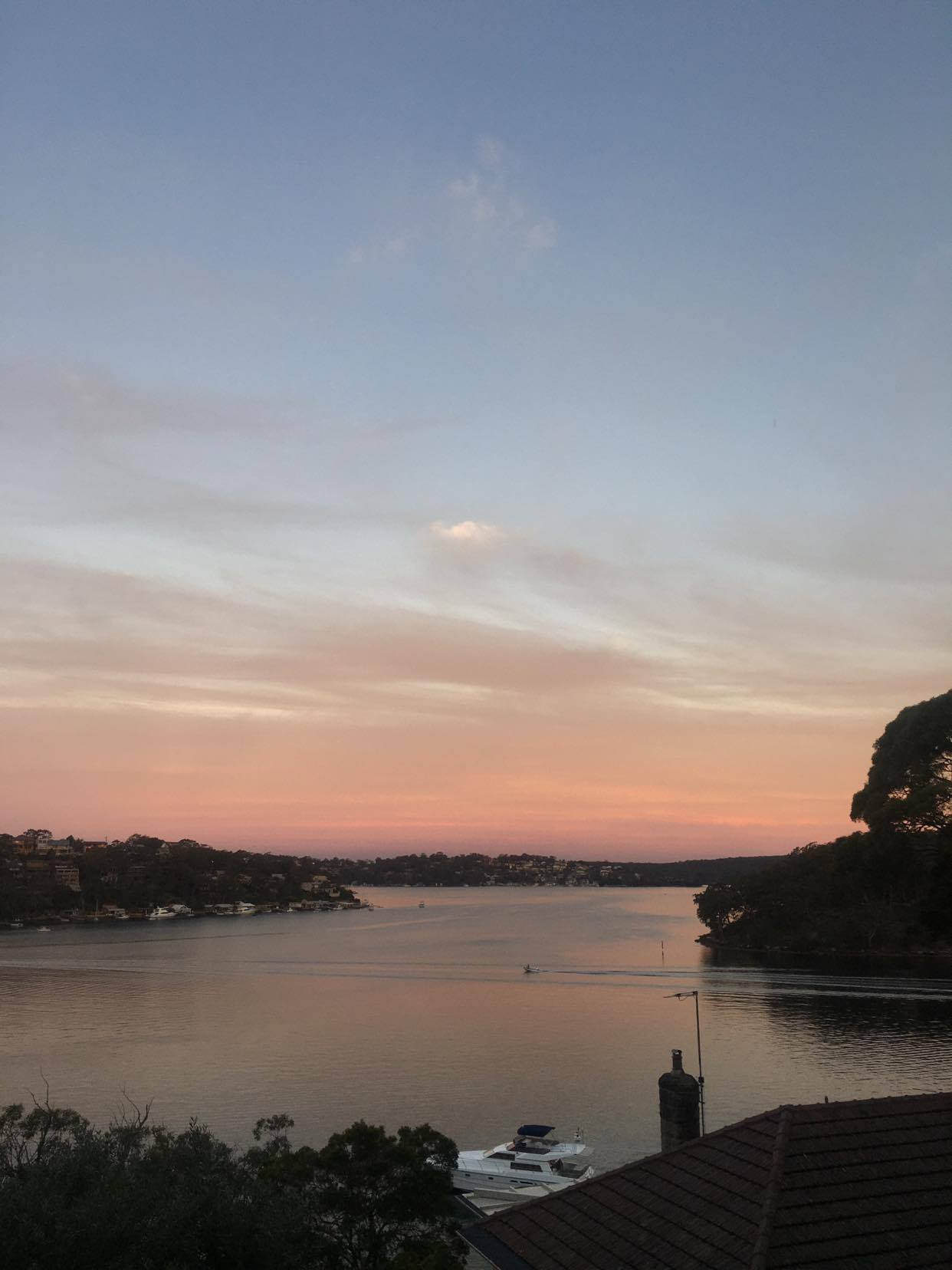
Gymea Bay Sunset
