= Rail Clearways Program =

Australian railway infrastructure project

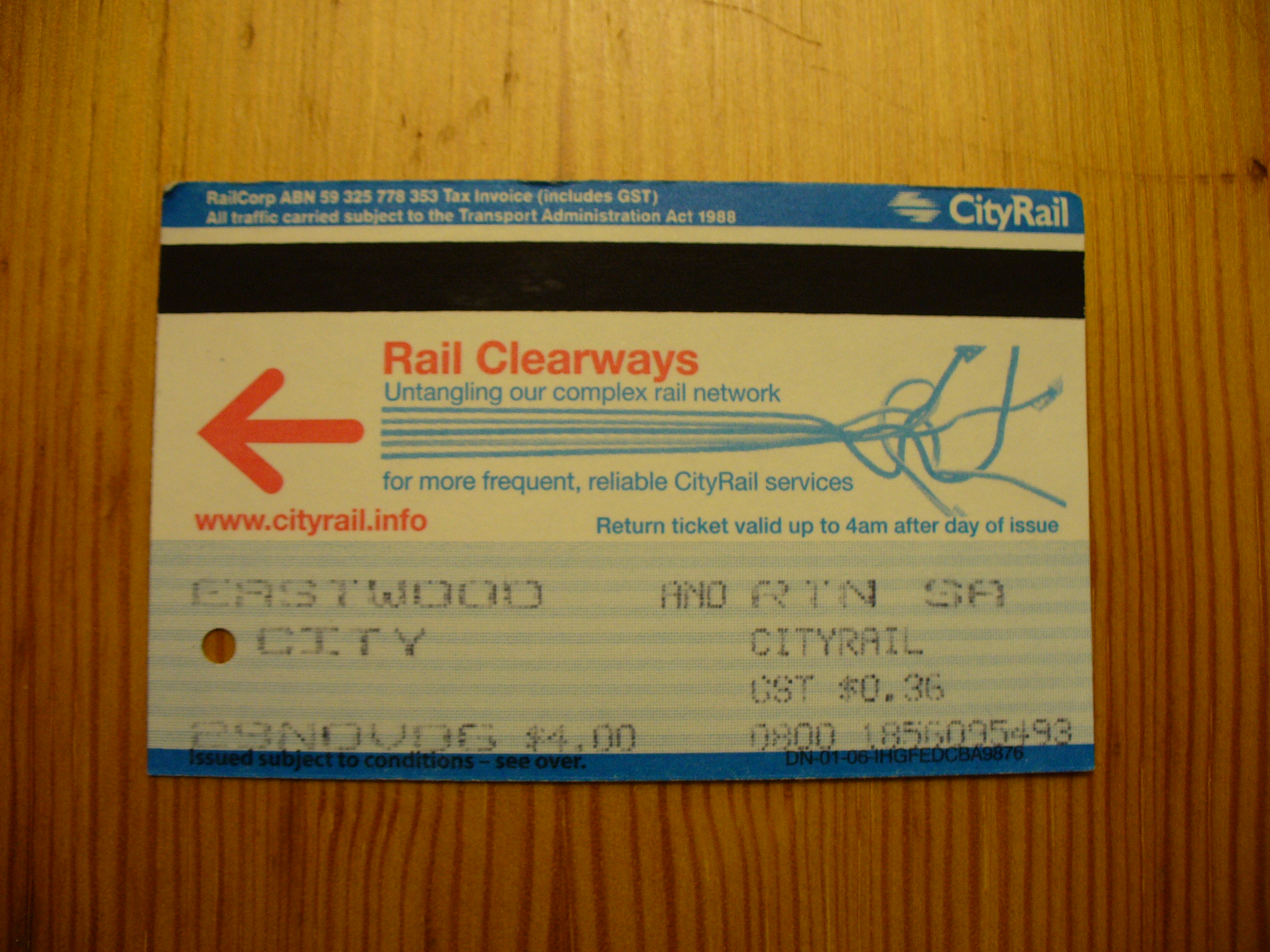
CityRail ticket with Rail Clearways promotional material

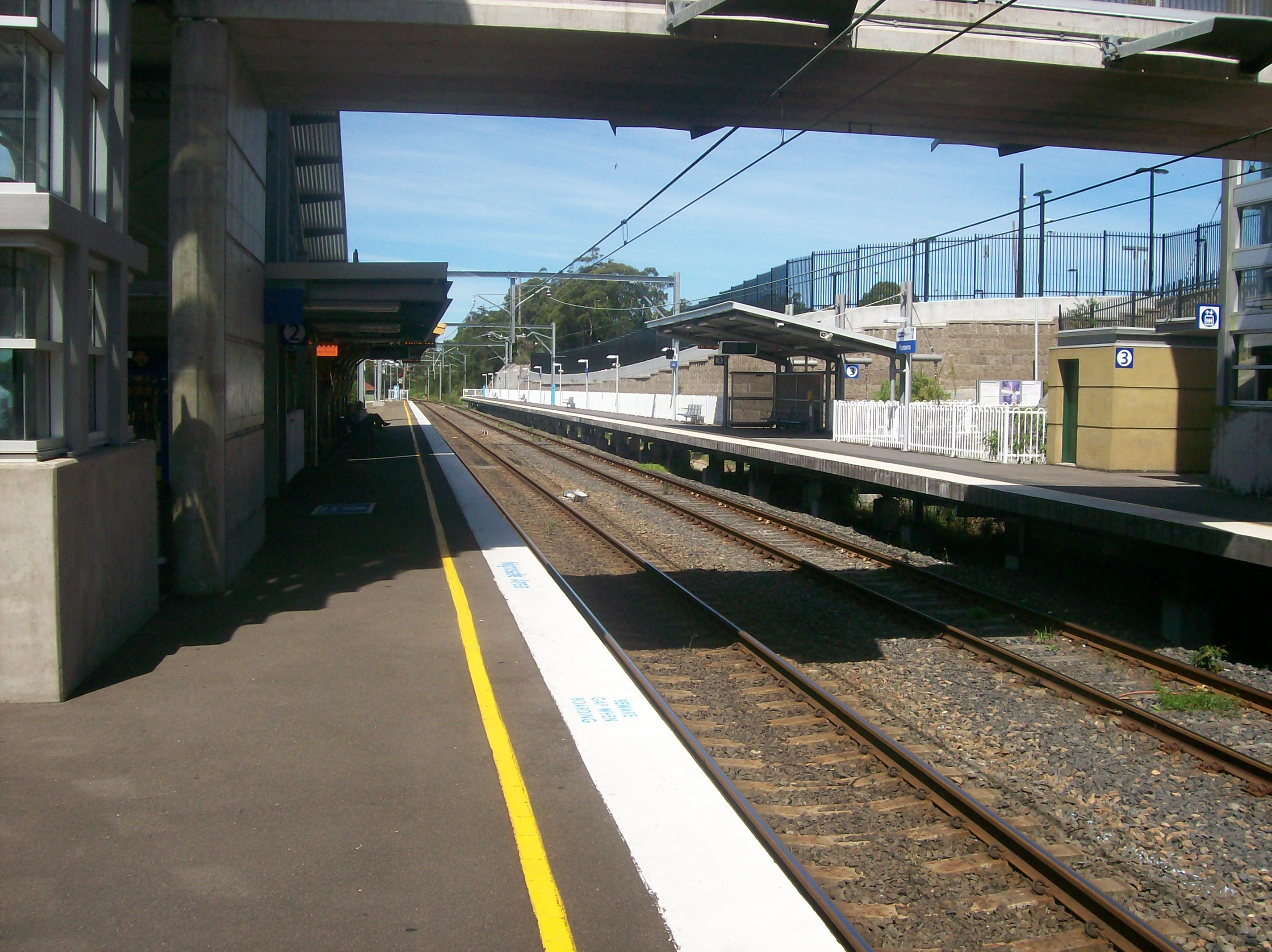
Berowra additional platform completed in October 2006

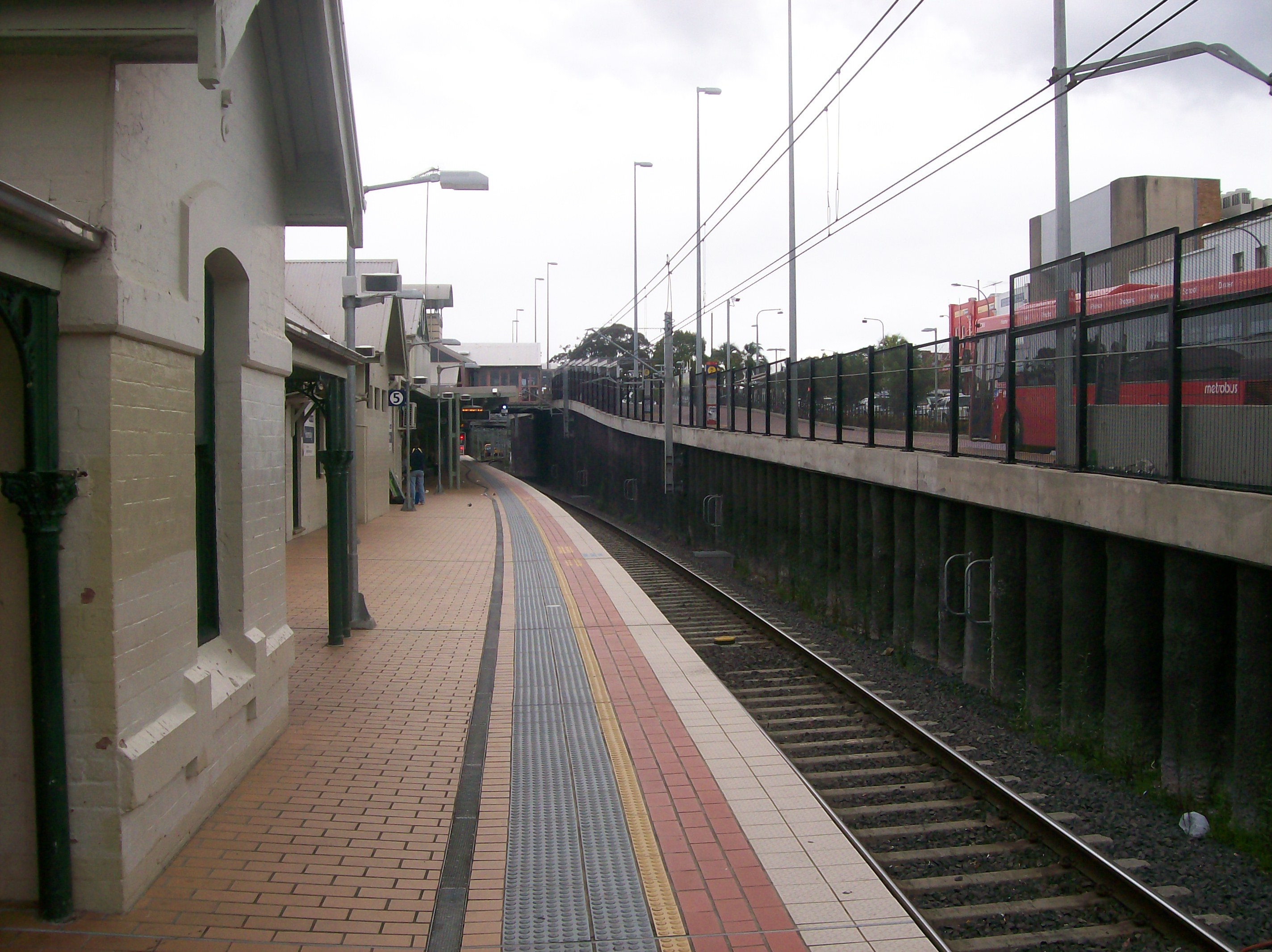
Hornsby additional platform completed in April 2009

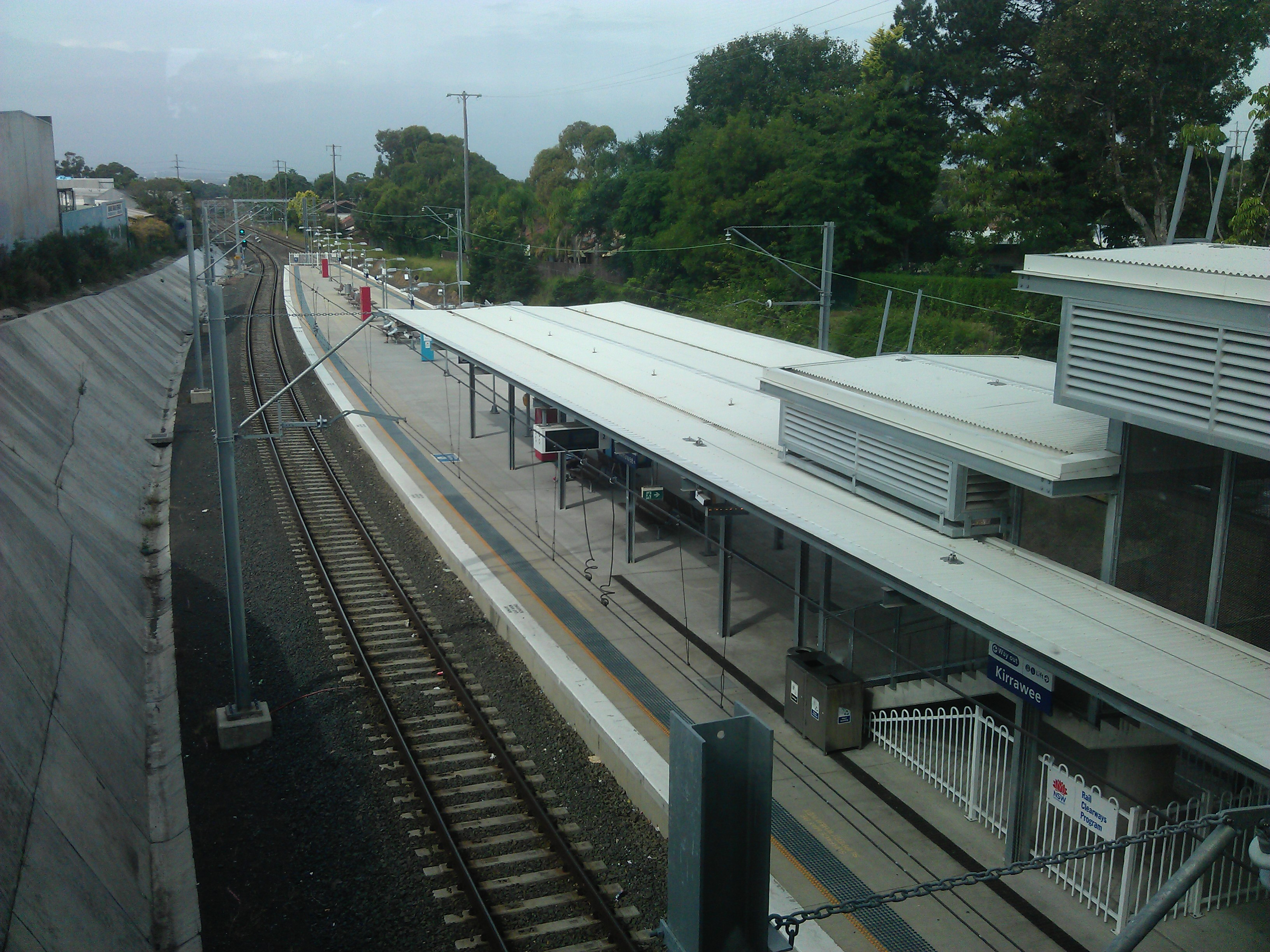
Kirrawee additional platform built as part of Cronulla line duplication completed in April 2010

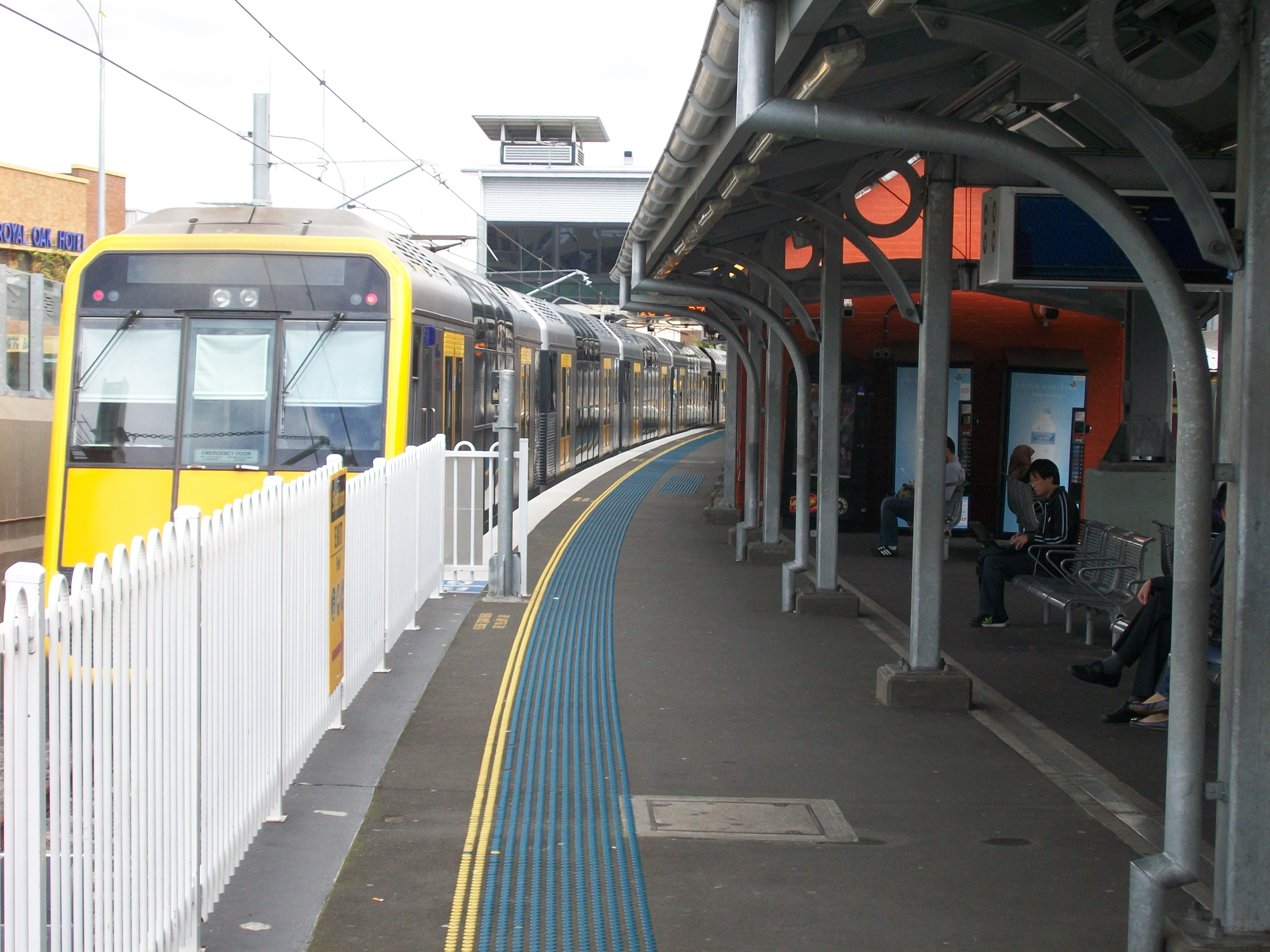
Lidcombe turnback platform completed in November 2010

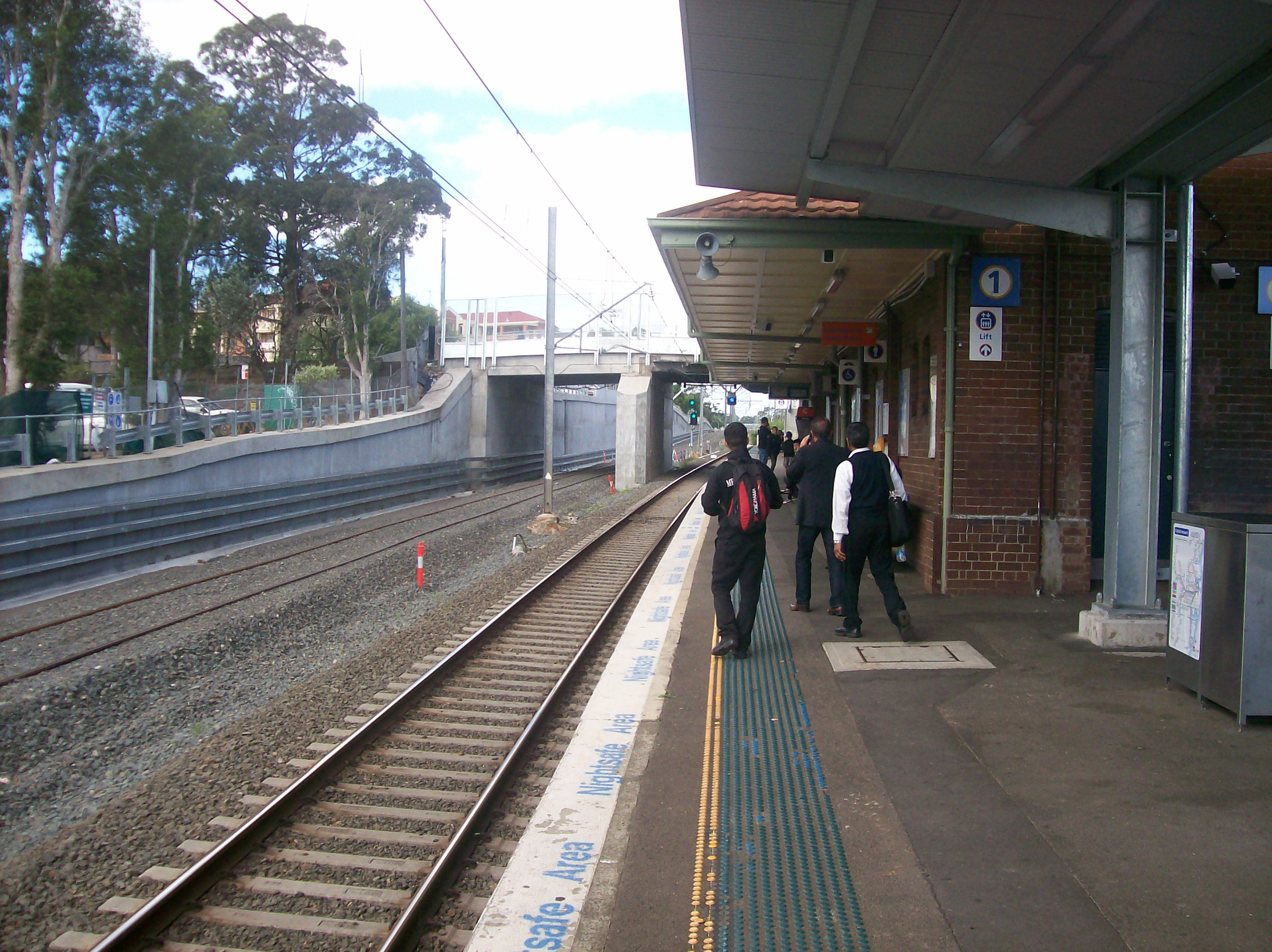
Extra track at Riverwood laid as part of Kingsgrove to Revesby quadruplication completed in April 2013

The Rail Clearways Program was conceived in 2004 with the aim of easing congestion of Sydney's suburban railway network, by reducing the amount of infrastructure shared by multiple services. The disparate projects at pinch points throughout the network were designed to increase passenger capacity and improve reliability. All projects were delivered by the Transport Construction Authority until it was subsumed in November 2011 by Transport for New South Wales. A new timetable was introduced in October 2013 that realised the benefit of many of the projects, and by January 2014 the program was complete.

== Conception ==
In the mid-2000s, the Government of New South Wales suffered heavy criticism for its perceived mishandling of the Sydney rail network, which had very poor on-time performance following the January 2003 Waterfall train disaster. The safety regime introduced after this crash required drivers to stick to the speed limit, which often caused delays due to the expectations of the timetable for higher speeds. A slower timetable was introduced in September 2005, which significantly improving on-time running of services. The Clearways Programme was intended as the next step in improving the network.

== Clearways routes ==
The Clearways Programme aimed to divide fourteen rail lines into five independent "clearways", reducing the heavily interwoven nature of the Sydney system. This was intended to isolate incidents to one part of the network so other lines would still run as scheduled. The "clearways" feed the existing lines through the Sydney Central Business District.

As the Carlingford line did not run through the CBD, it was not included in a "clearway". Track upgrades to the Carlingford Line were still included in the program, but this was cancelled in the November 2008 Mini-Budget. The Carlingford line north of Camellia was later converted to light rail and permanently closed south of Camellia.

The five clearways routes are:

=== Clearway 1: Eastern Suburbs & Illawarra ===
This route did not change from the pre-Clearways Eastern Suburbs & Illawarra Line. The projects undertaken on this route have increased passenger capacity.

=== Clearway 2: Bankstown ===
After the Airport line opened in May 2000, most trains from the East Hills line used the new line to approach the city. This eased congestion on the older line between Sydenham and Erskineville, where tracks were shared with services from the Bankstown line. Under the programme, new dedicated tracks for the Bankstown line between Sydenham and Erskineville were to be constructed to the west of the existing four tracks to allow express East Hills line trains from Clearway 3 to again run via Sydenham. The Airport line would be served by all-stops East Hills Line trains from Clearway 4.

St Peters and Erskineville railway stations were expected to continue to be served by the Bankstown line. This would have required platforms—partially completed in the 1970s from the Eastern Suburbs line construction—to have been activated at these two stations. The works were cancelled in November 2008, and the plan for frequent operation of express East Hills line services via Sydenham was abandoned.

A second Bankstown line project involved the construction of a new turn-back platform at Lidcombe, separating the Bankstown line's operations from trains on the Main Suburban line. This worked in concert with the Homebush turn-back project, which provided a terminating point for all stations Inner West Line services on the Main Suburban. This separation was enacted in the October 2013 timetable. The turn-back platform at Lidcombe was also marked in 2012 as a terminal for Sydney Metro Southwest, with original plans to convert the Bankstown line through to Lidcombe and Cabramatta into rapid transit. This plan has since been altered to have Bankstown as the terminus of the metro line.

=== Clearway 3: Campbelltown Express and Clearway 4: Airport & South ===
The Campbelltown Express Clearway would have separated the section of the East Hills Line east of Revesby by quadruplicating between Kingsgrove and Revesby and sending express trains to the City Circle via Sydenham. This was to allow more frequent express services to the city, relieve pressure on other parts of the network and improve the distribution of passengers.

On the Airport & South Clearway, express services would have begun at Glenfield and made their way through Liverpool, Cabramatta, Granville, Lidcombe and Strathfield stations to the City Circle, while all-stations services to the City started at Homebush. After passing through the City Circle, trains would have headed south-west via the Airport Line to Revesby (running parallel with the Campbelltown Express line from Wolli Creek to Revesby).

In the October 2013 timetable, these two clearways were merged to create the Airport, Inner West & South Line. Differences from the original plan include via-Revesby and via-Granville trains sharing tracks between Glenfield and Macarthur, and all-stations and express trains via-Revesby sharing tracks between Revesby and Central. Most trains from Macarthur via Revesby use the local (pre-existing) tracks between Revesby and Wolli Creek, and make a number of stops along the route. These trains approach the City via the Airport. The route via-Sydenham and the express tracks between Wolli Creek and Revesby are only used by a limited number of peak-hour services as well as NSW Trains services to Goulburn, Canberra, Griffith and Melbourne.

In the November 2017 timetable, in addition to peak-hour trains from Macarthur via Sydenham utilising the express tracks between Wolli Creek and Revesby, most Macarthur via Airport services throughout the day now operate via the express tracks, resulting in the full separation of Macarthur express trains from Revesby all-stations trains which continue to use the local tracks. This has resulted in the removal of express trains for Padstow and Riverwood as the express tracks are unable to serve those stations where there are no platforms.

=== Clearway 5: North West ===
The North West Clearway provides an independent corridor for the North Shore & Western Line and Northern Line to improve reliability and capacity. Trains from the west start from the Richmond, Penrith or Epping branches, meet up at Strathfield and travel through the city to Chatswood. Here trains used to split, either continuing up the North Shore Line to Berowra, or via the Chatswood to Epping Line to Hornsby, prior to its conversion to Sydney Metro Northwest in 2018.

== Projects ==
Many infrastructure upgrades needed to be completed in order to implement the Clearways plan. These projects included upgrading stations, adding extra tracks, stabling facilities, or upgrading junctions. The projects were:

Project	Clearway	Description	Opened
Berowra third platform	North West	Allows through trains to pass terminating suburban trains	October 2006
Bondi Junction turnback and stabling sidings.	Eastern Suburbs & Illawarra	Improves terminating capacity and provides more space for trains to be stabled in off-peak periods	July 2006
Carlingford line passing loop at Rydalmere	N/A	Would have provided a passing opportunity on the single track section between Rosehill and Carlingford	Cancelled November 2008
Erskineville-Sydenham six tracks	Bankstown; Campbelltown Express	Would have created a new track pair for Bankstown line trains, allowing Campbelltown Express trains to have their own track pair	Cancelled November 2008
Homebush Turnback	Airport & South	Breaks the Bankstown loop by giving Inner West line trains a place to terminate where six tracks reduce to four	March 2011
Hornsby fifth platform	North West	Allows through trains to pass terminating suburban trains	March 2009
Kingsgrove-Revesby Quadruplication	Campbelltown Express; Airport & South	Allows express trains to overtake and remain separate from all stops services, in conjunction with existing four track section between Wolli Creek and Kingsgrove	April 2013
Lidcombe Turnback	Bankstown	Breaks the Bankstown loop by giving Bankstown line trains a place to terminate	November 2010
Liverpool Second Turnback	Bankstown	New platform for through trains, allowing conversion of existing through platform and side turnback into two centre turnbacks	January 2014
Macarthur fourth platform and upgrade	Campbelltown Express	New platform for through trains, allowing conversion of existing through platform into centre turnback	Stage one (upgrade): December 2010; Stage two (new platform) deferred 2013
Macdonaldtown Turnback	Airport & South	Allows trains to layover close to the city	December 2005
Macdonaldtown Stabling	Airport & South	Extension of Macdonaldtown Turnback	November 2007
Quakers Hill-Vineyard Duplication	North West	Improves capacity to support new suburbs in North-Western Sydney	Schofields – Vineyard deferred Oct 2008; Quakers Hill – Schofields: October 2011
Revesby Turnback	Airport & South	Replacement of side turnback at East Hills with more efficient centre turnback	December 2008
Sutherland-Cronulla Duplication	Eastern Suburbs & Illawarra	Duplication of single track sections between Sutherland and Gymea and between Caringbah and Cronulla to improve capacity	April 2010

The projects of the Rail Clearways Program overlaid on a map of the Sydney suburban passenger rail network as it existed at the conclusion of the program in 2014. Completed Partially completed Cancelled

== Non-clearways projects ==
Other projects of the era which were not part of the Rail Clearways program:

- Epping to Chatswood railway line – opened February 2009
- Southern Sydney Freight Line by the Australian Rail Track Corporation – gives freight services their own dedicated line through southern Sydney – opened January 2013
- South West Rail Link – includes an additional platform at Glenfield and a flyover at Glenfield North Junction – opened February 2015
- Northern Sydney Freight Corridor – a series of projects to increase capacity for freight services – completed June 2016

Resignalling:

- Sefton – completed January 2006
- Oatley – Cronulla – completed April 2010
- North Sydney – St Leonards

Cancelled projects included:

- Redfern to Chatswood line – announced in 2005, cancelled in 2008
- CBD Relief Line – announced in 2010, cancelled in 2011

== See also ==
- Transport in Sydney in the 2010s
