= Sutherland railway station =

Railway station in Sydney, New South Wales, Australia

Sutherland
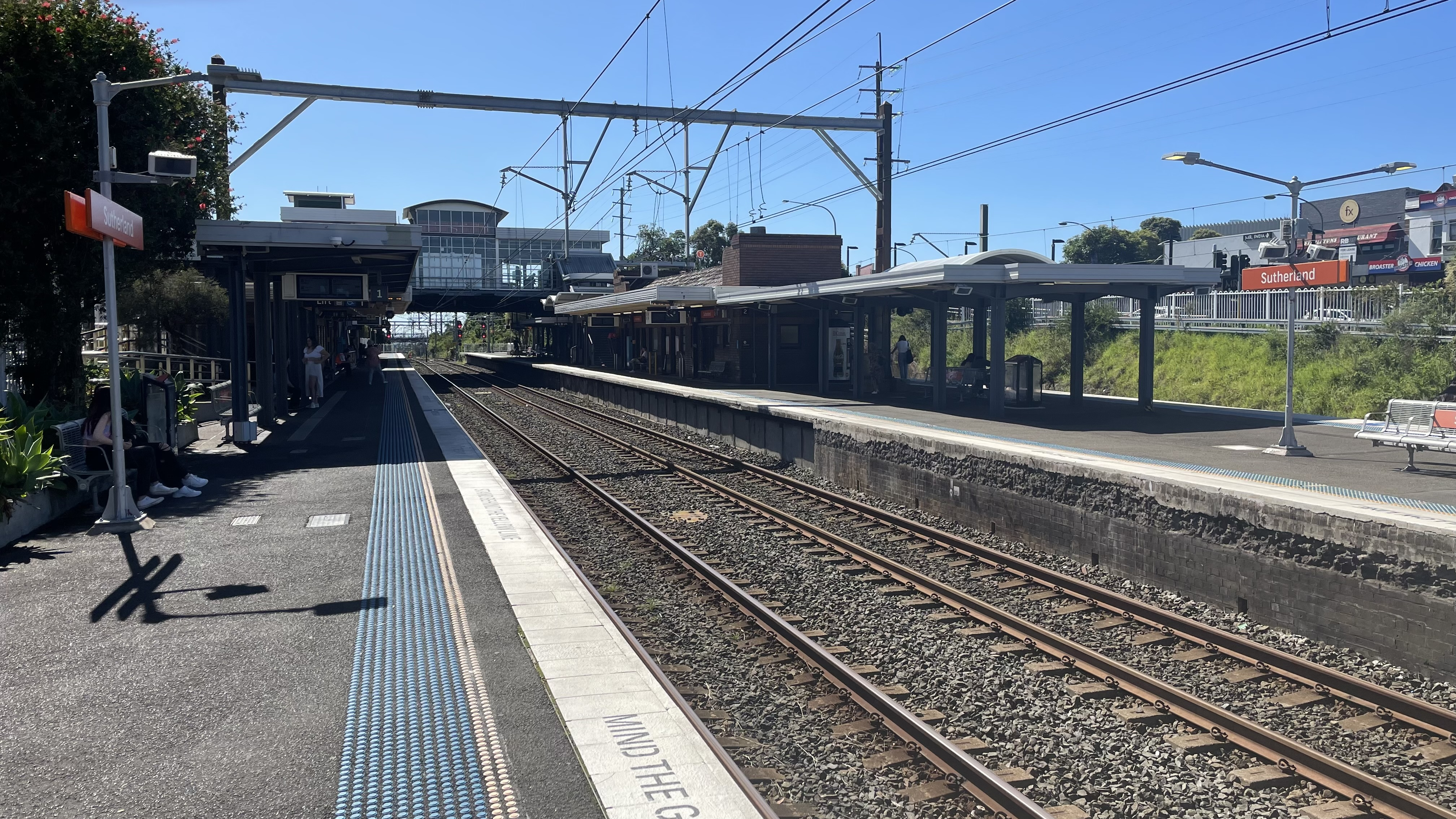
- Northbound view from Platform 1, April 2023

General information
- Location: Old Princes Highway, Sutherland; Sydney, New South Wales; Australia
- Coordinates: 34°01′54″S 151°03′26″E
- Elevation: 110 metres (360 ft)
- Owner: Transport Asset Manager of NSW
- Operator: Sydney Trains
- Lines: South Coast; Cronulla
- Distance: 24.640 km (15.311 mi) from Central
- Platforms: 3 (1 side, 1 island)
- Tracks: 3
- Connections: Bus

Construction
- Structure type: Ground
- Accessible: Yes

Other information
- Station code: SLD
- Website: Transport for NSW

History
- Opened: 26 December 1885 (140 years ago)
- Electrified: Yes (from 1926)

Passengers
- 2025: 3,471,533 (year); 9,511 (daily) (Sydney Trains)
- Rank: 48

Services
Preceding station	Sydney Trains	Following station
Loftus towards Waterfall	Eastern Suburbs & Illawarra Line	Jannali towards Bondi Junction
Kirrawee towards Cronulla	Eastern Suburbs & Illawarra Line	Jannali towards Bondi Junction
Preceding station	Intercity Trains	Following station
Loftus towards Kiama or Port Kembla	South Coast Line Limited weekday morning peak services	Jannali towards Central or Bondi Junction
Waterfall towards Kiama	South Coast Line	Hurstville towards Central or Bondi Junction
Helensburgh towards Kiama	South Coast Line	Hurstville towards Central or Bondi Junction
Excursion runs
Preceding station	East Coast Heritage Rail	Following station
Thirroul towards Moss Vale	The Cockatoo Run	Wolli Creek towards Central
Former services
Preceding station	Former services	Following station
Woronora Cemetery Terminus	Woronora Cemetery Line (1900–1947)	Regent Street Terminus
Location

Sutherland railway station is a suburban railway station located on the South Coast line, serving the Sydney suburb of Sutherland. It is served by Sydney Trains T4 Eastern Suburbs & Illawarra Line services and intercity South Coast Line services.

== History ==
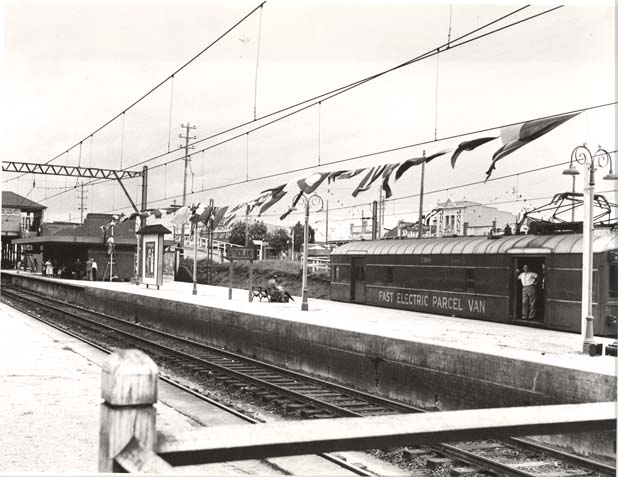
Station in 1954

Sutherland station opened on 26 December 1885 as the interim terminus of the Illawarra line when it was extended from Hurstville. The station opened for general rail traffic on 1 March 1886. It consisted of a brick station facing both the road and railway, a goods shed, and a stationmaster's residence. On 9 March 1886, the line was extended to Waterfall.

On 16 December 1939, Sutherland became a junction station with the opening of the Cronulla line. Although the electric wires continued south to Loftus and Royal National Park, until this was extended to Waterfall in 1980, Sutherland was the transfer station for services to Wollongong.

=== Upgrades ===
On 15 November 1993, an upgraded footbridge with a new ticket office and lifts was opened by Minister for Transport Bruce Baird.

A number of upgrades have taken place. In 2010, as part of the CityRail Clearways Program, the junction to the south of the station leading to the Cronulla railway line was duplicated.

A new bus interchange was completed in May 2014. A new lift to Platform 1 was completed in October 2014 making the station fully wheelchair accessible.

In August 2014, construction commenced on a new 340 vehicle multi-storey car park. It opened on 6 July 2015.

In 2018, the lift from platforms 2 and 3 was rebuilt to have the entrance from the north end instead of the south.

== Services ==
=== Platforms ===
Platform	Line	Stopping pattern	Notes
1	Eastern Suburbs & Illawarra Line	services to Bondi Junction	
1	South Coast Line	services to Central, Martin Place & Bondi Junction	
2	Eastern Suburbs & Illawarra Line	services to Waterfall, Helensburgh & Bondi Junction	
2	South Coast Line	services to Wollongong, Dapto & Kiama; 1 weekday morning peak service to Port Kembla	
3	Eastern Suburbs & Illawarra Line	services to Cronulla, Waterfall & Helensburgh	

=== Transport links ===
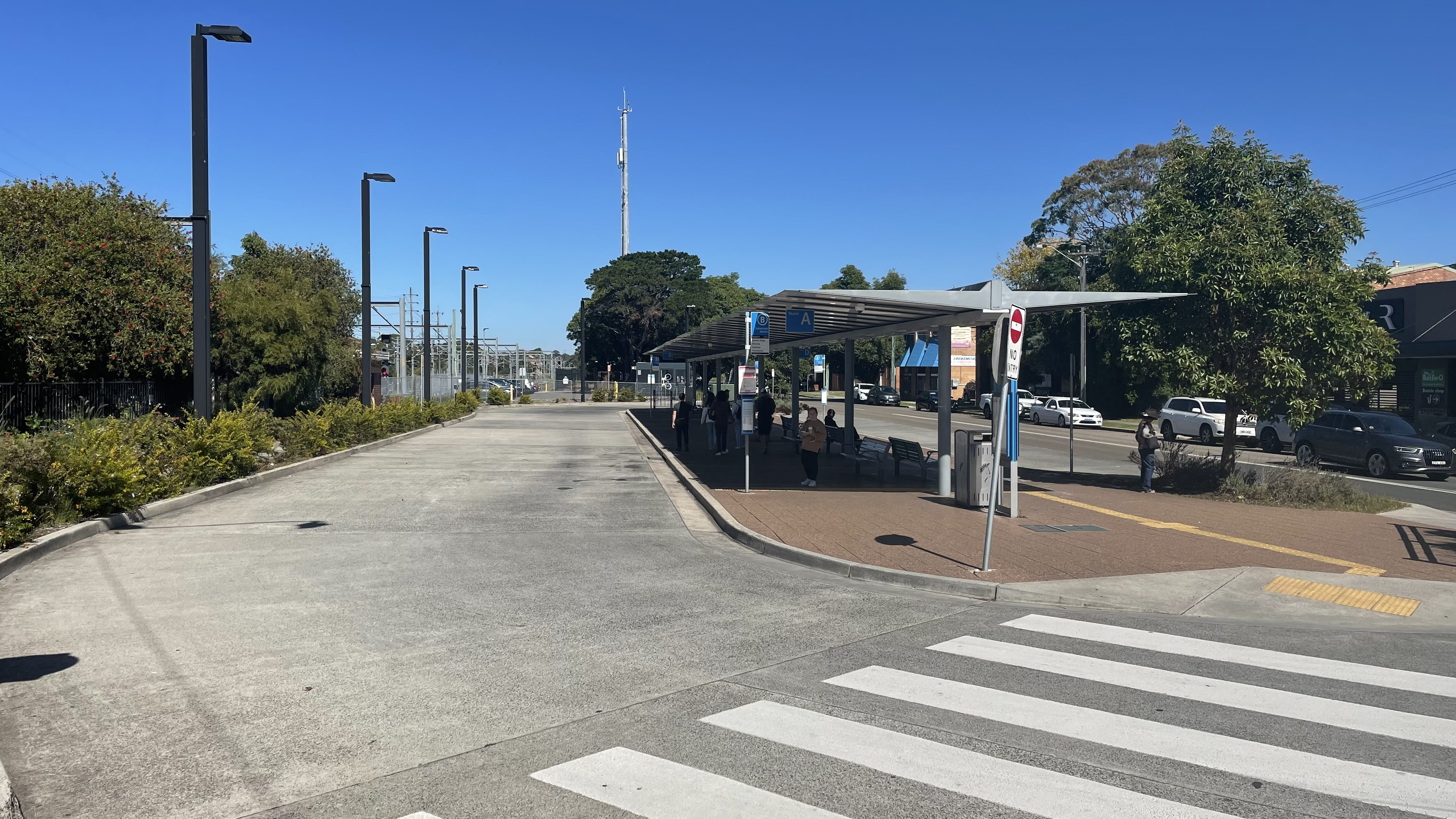
Bus interchange

U-Go Mobility operates eight bus routes via Sutherland station – all routes depart from the bus interchange on the western side of the station except routes 969 and 976, which depart from Flora Street on the eastern side:

- 960: to Bankstown station
- 961: Westfield Miranda to Barden Ridge
- 962: Westfield Miranda to East Hills station
- 965: to Woronora
- 969: to Cronulla
- 976: to Grays Point
- 991: to Heathcote
- 993: Westfield Miranda to Engadine & Woronora Heights

Sutherland station is served by one NightRide route:

- NightRide N10: to Town Hall station

== Trackplan ==
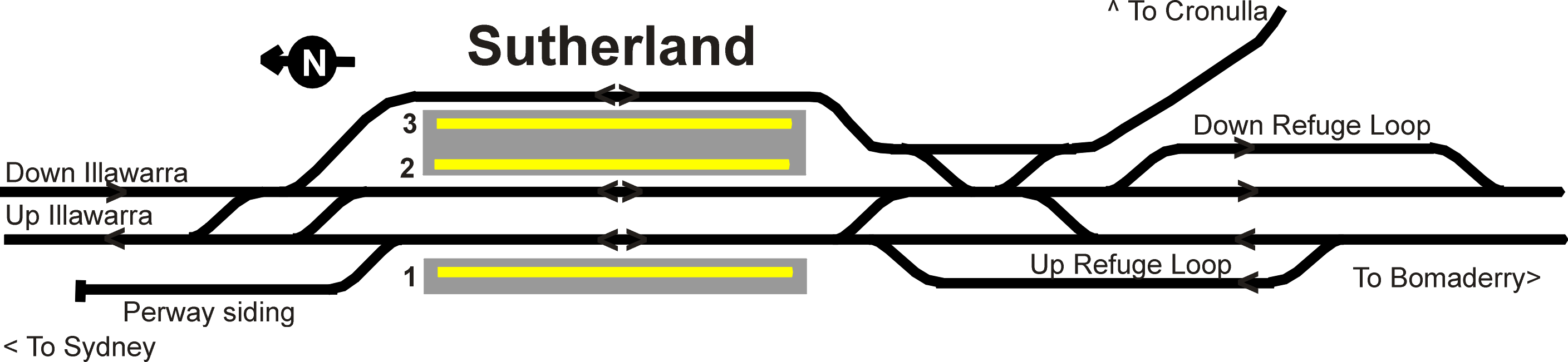
Track layout prior to completion of the Cronulla line duplication

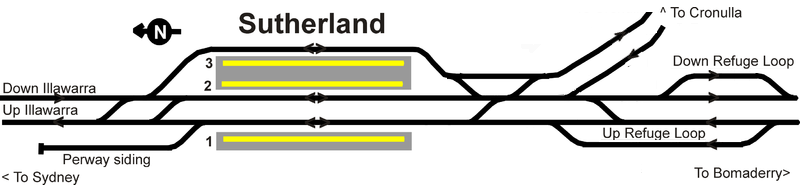
Track layout after the Cronulla line was duplicated in 2010
