= Arncliffe =

Arncliffe may refer to:

- Arncliffe, New South Wales, Australia
  - Electoral district of Arncliffe
  - Arncliffe railway station
- Arncliffe, North Yorkshire, England
