= Como railway station, Sydney =

Railway station in Sydney, New South Wales, Australia

Como
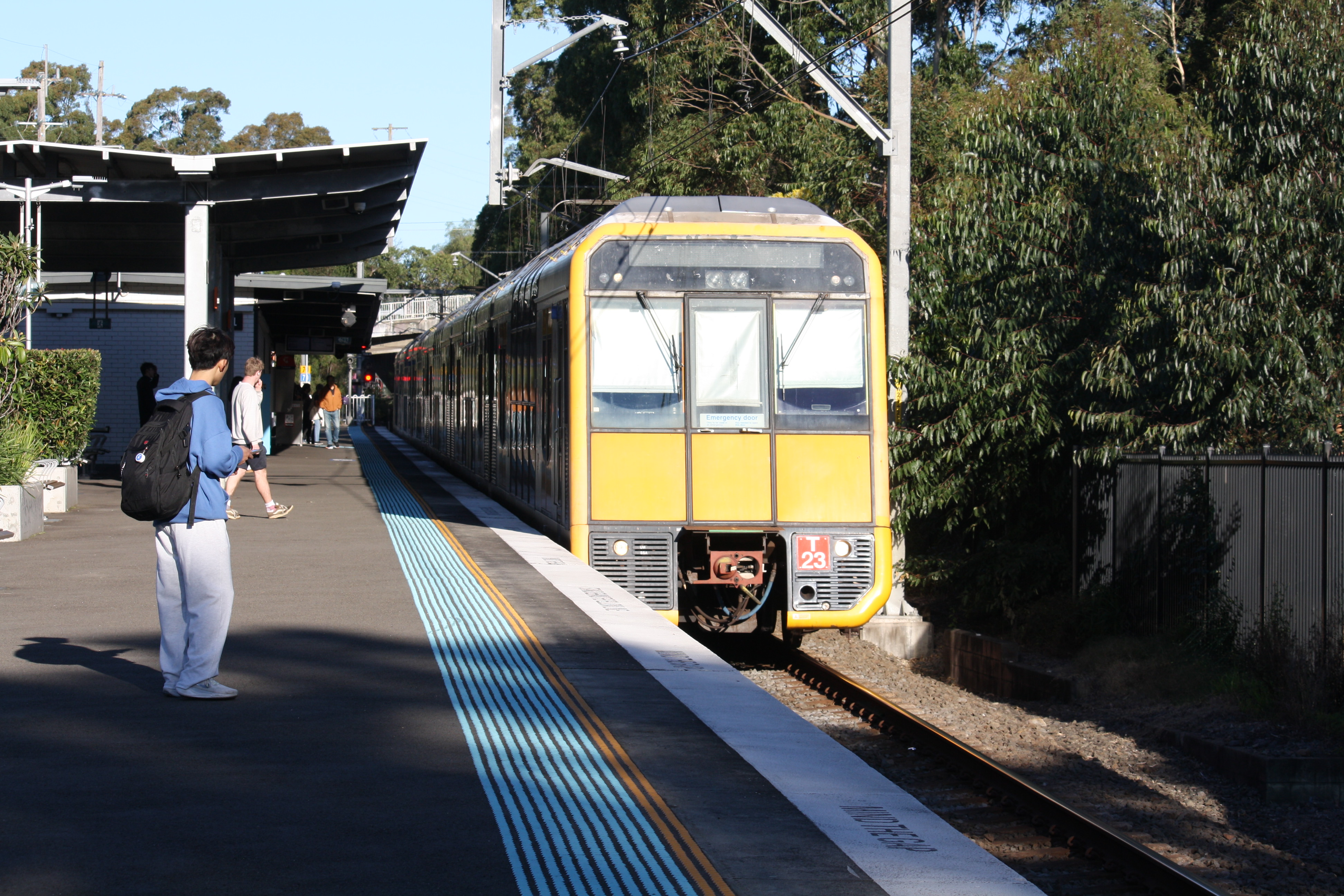
- Southbound view of a T Set arriving into platform 1 on a Bondi Junction service in June 2026

General information
- Location: Como Parade, Como; Sydney, New South Wales; Australia
- Coordinates: 34°00′15″S 151°04′05″E
- Elevation: 37 metres (121 ft)
- Owner: Transport Asset Manager of NSW
- Operator: Sydney Trains
- Line: South Coast
- Distance: 21.24 km (13.20 mi) from Central
- Platforms: 2 (1 island)
- Tracks: 2

Construction
- Structure type: Ground

Other information
- Status: Weekdays: Staffed: 6am to 2pm: Weekends and public holidays: Staffed: 6am to 2pm
- Station code: CMO
- Website: Transport for NSW

History
- Opened: 26 December 1885 (140 years ago)
- Rebuilt: 27 November 1972 (53 years ago)
- Electrified: Yes (from 1926)

Passengers
- 2025: 316,370 (year); 867 (daily) (Sydney Trains)
- Rank: 176

Services
Preceding station	Sydney Trains	Following station
Jannali towards Waterfall or Cronulla	Eastern Suburbs & Illawarra Line	Oatley towards Bondi Junction
Location

Como railway station is a suburban railway station located on the South Coast line, serving the Sydney suburb of Como. It is served by Sydney Trains T4 Eastern Suburbs & Illawarra Line services.

== History ==
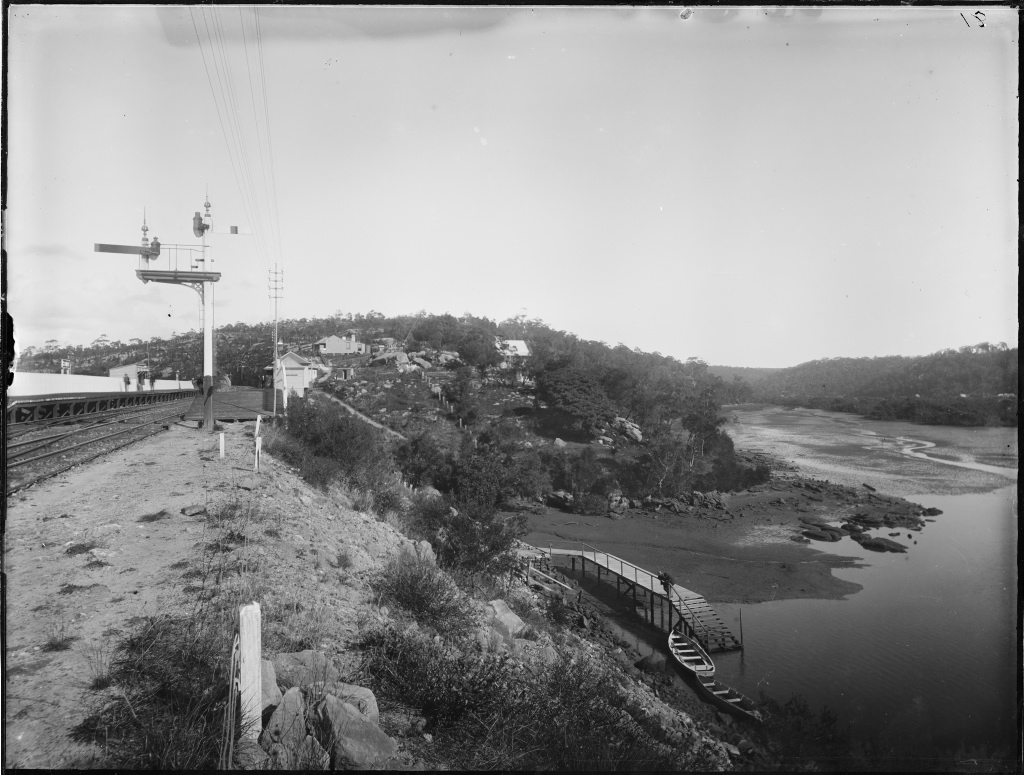
The original station

The first Como station opened on 26 December 1885 immediately south of the Georges River. When the original iron lattice girder bridge was replaced, a new station was built about one kilometre to the south opening on 27 November 1972.

The original station platform is still visible today near the southern end of the bridge. The station buildings have been demolished and a power sub-station was built in their place on the platform, most of which remains intact. There is no public access to the original platform but the subway tunnel under the rail line remains open.

On 22 November 2021, an upgrade to the station, which included two new lifts and a solar-glass canopy, was opened to the public. The upgrade won national recognition receiving awards for its sustainability and innovation.

== Services ==
=== Platforms ===
Platform	Line	Stopping pattern	Notes
1	T4	services to Bondi Junction	
2	T4	services to Cronulla and Waterfall	
