= Patricia Carlon =

Australian writer (1927–2002)

- Born: Patricia Bernadette Carlon; 9 January 1927; Wagga Wagga, New South Wales, Australia
- Died: 29 July 2002 (aged 75); Bexley, New South Wales
- Occupation: Writer
- Known for: Crime fiction, suspense

Patricia Bernadette Carlon (9 January 1927 - 29 July 2002) was an Australian crime fiction writer whose most notable works are fourteen suspenseful novels published between 1961 and 1970. She sometimes used the pen names Patricia Bernard and Barbara Christie.

== Biography ==
Patricia Carlon was born in Wagga Wagga, New South Wales. She was rediscovered in the 1990s, after The Whispering Wall (1969) and The Souvenir (1970) were republished as part of a series of Australian Classic Crime. These and other novels have subsequently been reissued in the United States and Australia.

Carlon lived almost all her life with, or next door to, her parents, in Wagga Wagga and the Sydney suburbs of Homebush and Bexley. Her income source from her late teens onwards was writing articles and short stories for magazines as well as her novels. She refused all interviews.

After her death in Bexley, it became known that she had been profoundly deaf since the age of 11. This was something even her publishers had been unaware of, as she always communicated with them by letter. Her deafness has since been related to themes and plots in her novels, in which people in possession of the truth about a crime are often isolated and in peril, either through being physically trapped, or because they are unable make others believe them.

== Selected novels ==
- Circle of Fear (1961)
- Danger in the Dark (1962)
- Who Are You, Linda Condrick? (1962)
- The Price of an Orphan (1964)
- The Unquiet Night (1965)
- Crime of Silence (1965)
- Betray Me If You Dare (1966)
- The Running Woman (1966)
- See Nothing, Say Nothing (1967)
- Hush, It's a Game (1967)
- Forty Pieces of Alloy (1968)
- The Whispering Wall (1969)
- The Souvenir (1970)
- Death by Demonstration (1970)
