= Banksia railway station =

Railway station in Sydney, New South Wales, Australia

Banksia
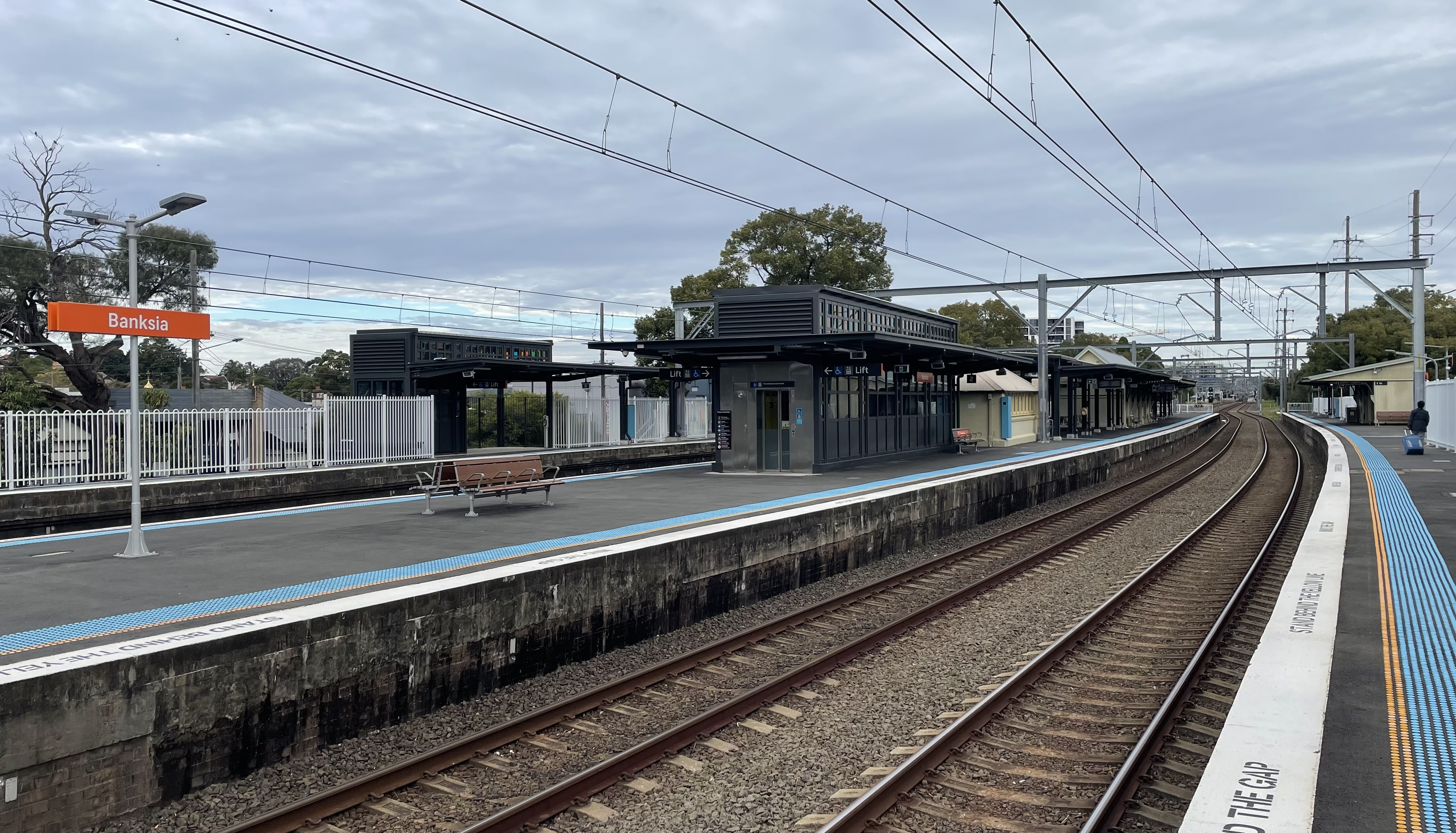
- Northbound view from Platform 1 in June 2022

General information
- Location: Railway Street, Banksia; Sydney, New South Wales; Australia
- Coordinates: 33°56′43″S 151°08′26″E
- Owner: Transport Asset Manager of NSW
- Operator: Sydney Trains
- Line: South Coast
- Distance: 9.60 km (5.97 mi) from Central
- Platforms: 4 (2 side, 1 island)
- Tracks: 4
- Connections: Bus

Construction
- Structure type: Ground
- Accessible: Yes

Other information
- Status: Weekdays: Staffed: 6am to 7pm: Weekends and public holidays: Staffed: 8am to 4pm
- Station code: BKS
- Website: Transport for NSW

History
- Opened: 21 October 1906 (119 years ago)
- Electrified: Yes (from 1926)

Passengers
- 2025: 762,866 (year); 2,090 (daily) (Sydney Trains)
- Rank: 138

Services
Preceding station	Sydney Trains	Following station
Rockdale towards Waterfall or Cronulla	Eastern Suburbs & Illawarra Line	Arncliffe towards Bondi Junction
Location

Banksia railway station is a suburban railway station located on the South Coast line, serving the Sydney suburb of Banksia. It is served by Sydney Trains T4 Eastern Suburbs & Illawarra Line services.

== History ==
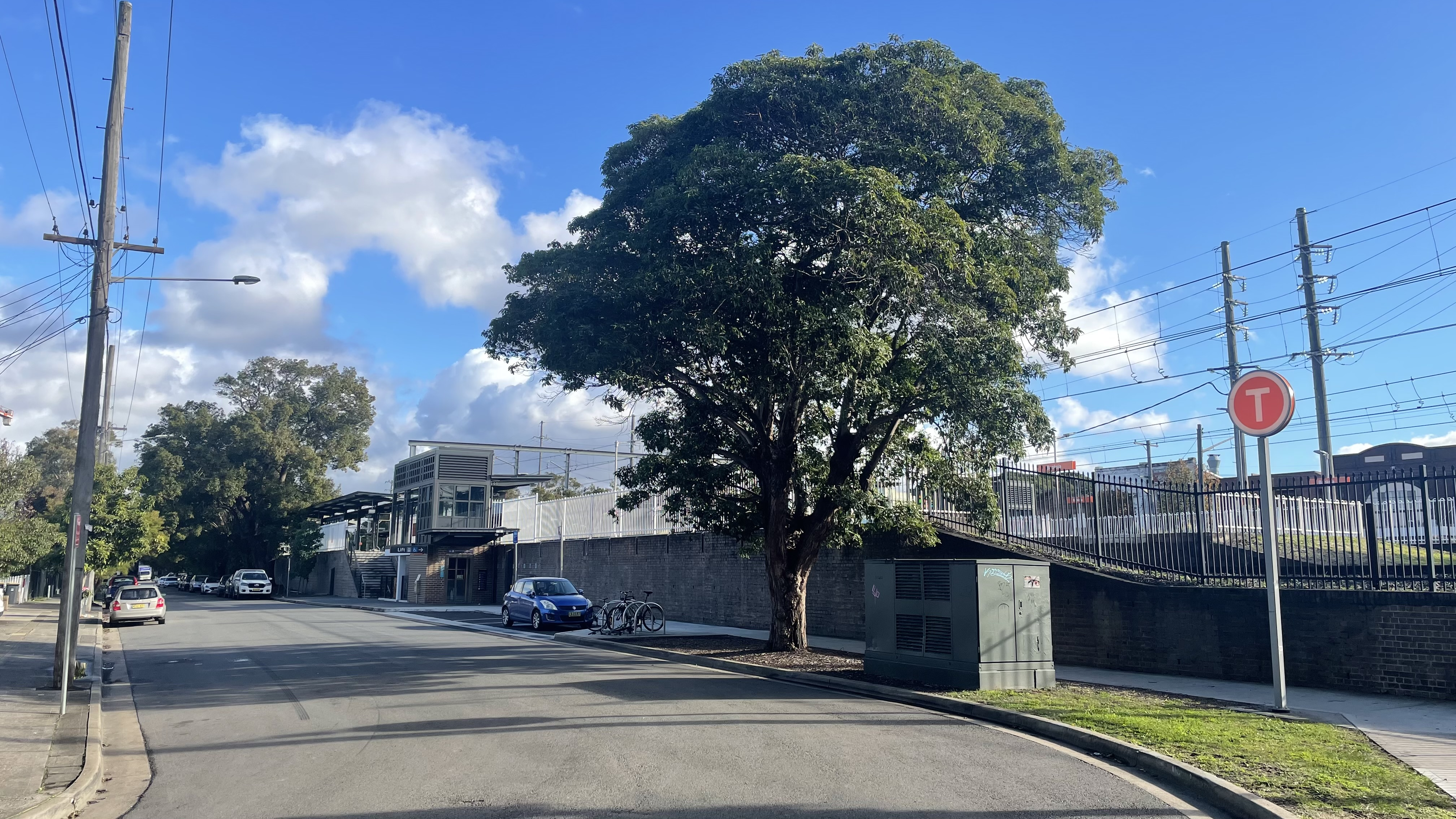
Eastern entrance on Hattersley Street

Banksia station opened on 21 October 1906 with one island platform. In 1923, as part of the quadruplication of the South Coast line from Wolli Creek to Rockdale, Platforms 1 and 4 were built along with an underpass.

In August 2020, an upgrade to Banksia station as part of the Station Access Program was proposed. It includes the addition of lifts, heavily modified entrances, canopy extensions, and upgraded toilets. Construction began in December 2020 and was completed on 16 March 2022, and the lifts were opened on 7 April 2022.

== Services ==
=== Platforms ===
Platform	Line	Stopping pattern	Notes
1	T4	services to Bondi Junction	Peak platform
2	T4	services to Hurstville	Peak platform
3	T4	services to Bondi Junction	Off-peak platform
4	T4	services to Cronulla, Waterfall and Helensburgh	Off-peak platform

=== Transport links ===
Transit Systems operates one bus route via Banksia station, under contract to Transport for NSW:

- 420 Westfield Burwood to Mascot station via Sydney Airport

Banksia station is served by three NightRide routes:

- N10: Sutherland station to Town Hall station
- N11: Cronulla station to Town Hall station
- N20: Riverwood station to Town Hall station
