= T4 Eastern Suburbs & Illawarra Line =

Rail service in Sydney, New South Wales, Australia

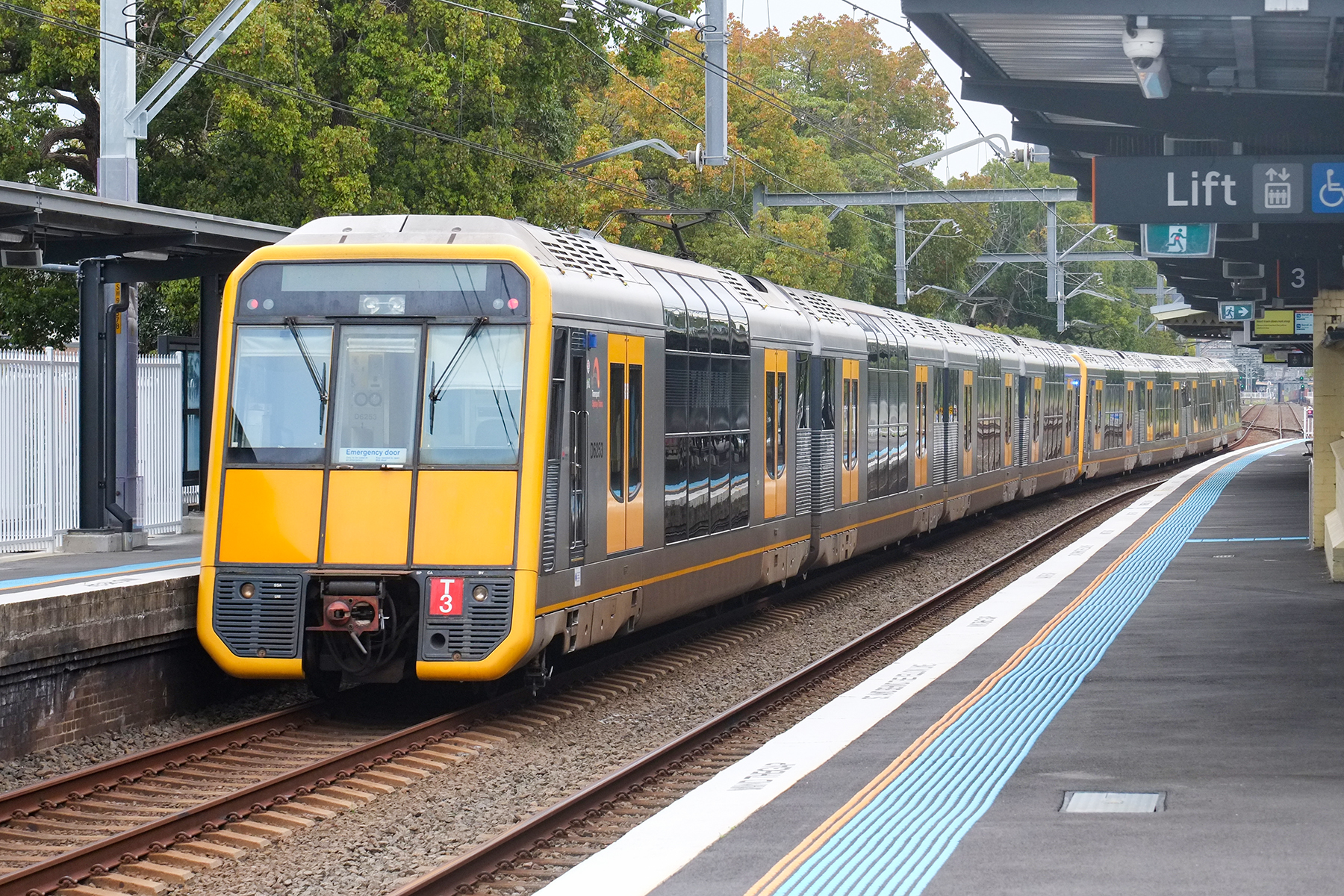
- A T set at Banksia

Overview
- Owner: Transport Asset Manager of New South Wales
- Locale: Sydney, New South Wales
- Termini: Waterfall/Cronulla; Bondi Junction
- Stations: 33
- Website: transportnsw.info/routes/details/sydney-trains/t4/020T4

Service
- Type: Commuter rail
- Operator: Sydney Trains
- Depot: Mortdale
- Rolling stock: T, H sets (peak hours only)

History
- Opened: 15 October 1884; 142 years ago

Technical
- Track gauge: 1,435 mm (4 ft 8 1/2 in) standard gauge
Sydney rail network
Sydney Trains suburban services
T1 North Shore & Western
T2 Leppington & Inner West
T3 Liverpool & Inner West
T4 Eastern Suburbs & Illawarra
T5 Cumberland
T6 Lidcombe & Bankstown
T7 Olympic Park
T8 Airport & South
T9 Northern
Sydney Metro
M1 Metro North West & Bankstown

The T4 Eastern Suburbs & Illawarra Line is a suburban rail line on the Sydney Trains network in the eastern and southern suburbs of Sydney. The line was constructed in the 1880s to Wollongong to take advantage of agricultural and mining potentials in the Illawarra area. In March 1926, it became the first railway in New South Wales to run electric train services.

Today, the railway consists of three connected lines: the original Illawarra line from the Sydney CBD to Waterfall; the Cronulla line from Sutherland to Cronulla, which opened in 1939 replacing an earlier tram service; and the Eastern Suburbs line from the Sydney CBD to Bondi Junction, which opened in 1979.

Operationally and historically, the entire line from the Illawarra Junction at Redfern to its terminus in Bomaderry on the South Coast was known as the Illawarra Line. However, since 1989, the suburban services to Waterfall and Cronulla have been marketed as the Eastern Suburbs & Illawarra Line and interurban services south to Wollongong and Bomaderry as the South Coast Line. The line is coloured an azure blue on Sydney Trains timetables and other promotional materials.

== Alignment ==
=== Eastern Suburbs Line ===
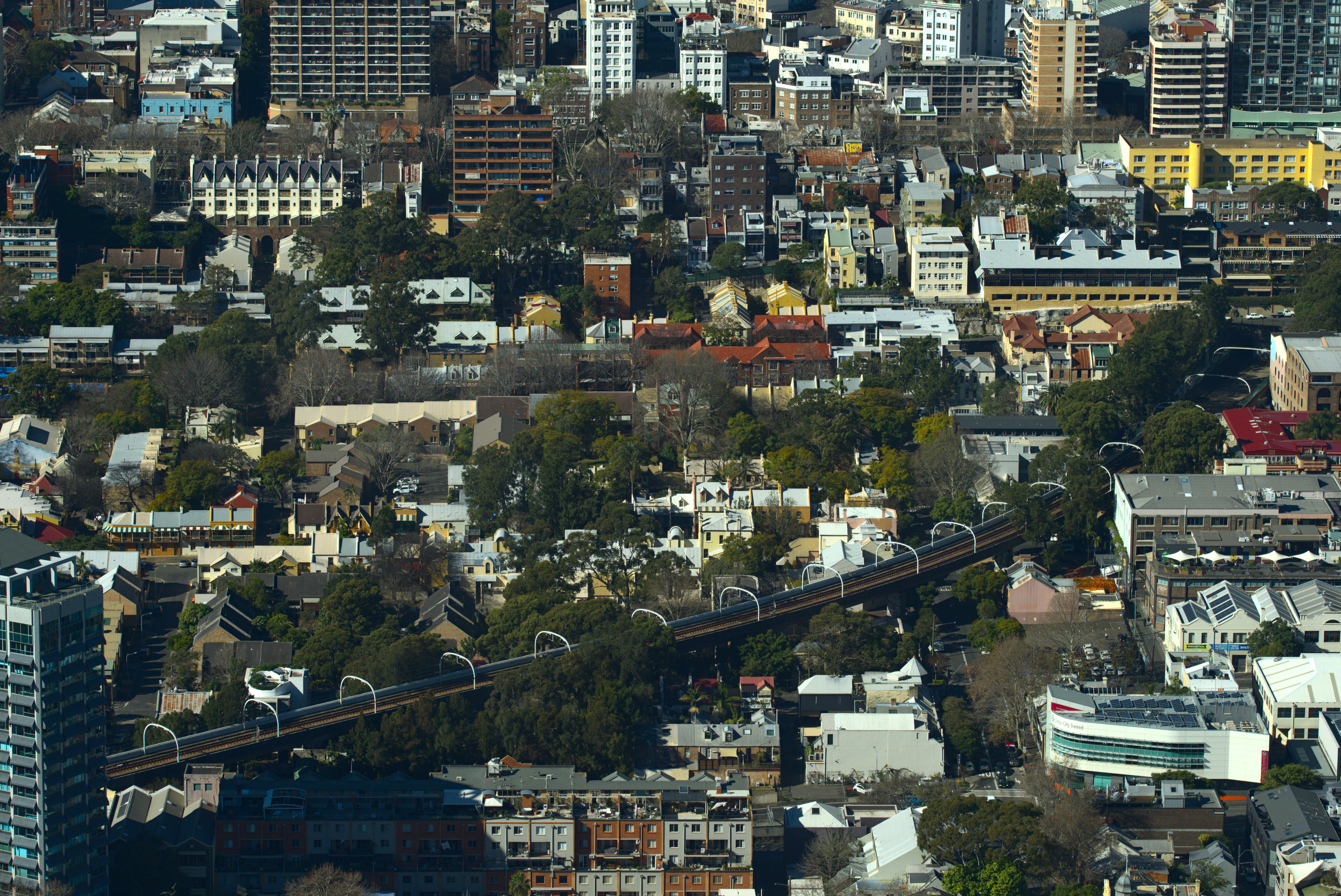
The viaduct across Woolloomooloo

The Eastern Suburbs Line runs between Bondi Junction in Sydney's east and Eveleigh, just south of the Sydney central business district. It is mostly underground, and consists of 7 kilometres (4.3 mi) of bored tunnels and 1.5 kilometres (0.93 mi) of cut and cover tunnels, with only 2 kilometres (1.2 mi) above ground. In the Eastern Suburbs, three tunnels proceed in a westerly direction from Bondi Junction via Edgecliff and Kings Cross; in each of these tunnels there are stations. Between Bondi Junction and Edgecliff, there is a short open-air cutting in Woollahra, and between Edgecliff and Kings Cross, there is a short viaduct over Rushcutters Bay.

From Kings Cross, the line proceeds west towards the Sydney Central Business District on a viaduct that passes over the suburb of Woolloomooloo and the Eastern Distributor. The line then passes into a tunnel underneath the Art Gallery of New South Wales to a station underneath Martin Place. Turning south, the line proceeds through Town Hall, Central and Redfern stations, before emerging behind the Eveleigh Railway Workshops. The line is double track throughout, with turnback sidings at Martin Place and Bondi Junction for citybound trains, and at Central for trains from Bondi Junction.

=== Illawarra and Cronulla Lines ===
The Illawarra Line commences at Illawarra Junction at Redfern and travels on the 'Illawarra' (eastern pair) tracks. A dive tunnel allows Intercity services from the South Coast Line to cross underneath the main suburban lines to access Central station. The Illawarra lines are also connected at this point to the Illawarra Relief Lines which emerge from underground and lead to the Eastern Suburbs Line.

From Illawarra Junction, four tracks head south through Erskineville and St Peters to Sydenham station. The 'main' pair of tracks are used by Eastern Suburbs & Illawarra Line and South Coast Line trains and the 'local' pair by Airport & South Line trains. The Airport & South Line trains continue along the Illawarra line until diverging onto the East Hills line around Wolli Creek. South of Wolli Creek station, a crossover allows trains from the 'main' pair of tracks to switch to the 'local' pair. This is used by peak hour all-stations Eastern Suburbs & Illawarra Line trains. The four track section ends at Hurstville. The line then continues as two tracks south towards Sutherland, crossing the Georges River via the Como railway bridge between Oatley and Como. At Sutherland the Cronulla line branches in an easterly direction. This line is double track throughout.

The main line then heads in a southerly direction, parallel to the Princes Highway to the west and bordering the Royal National Park on its eastern side until Waterfall, the last suburb in the Sydney metropolitan area. The track continues south from here as the South Coast Line through the Royal National Park towards the Illawarra region.

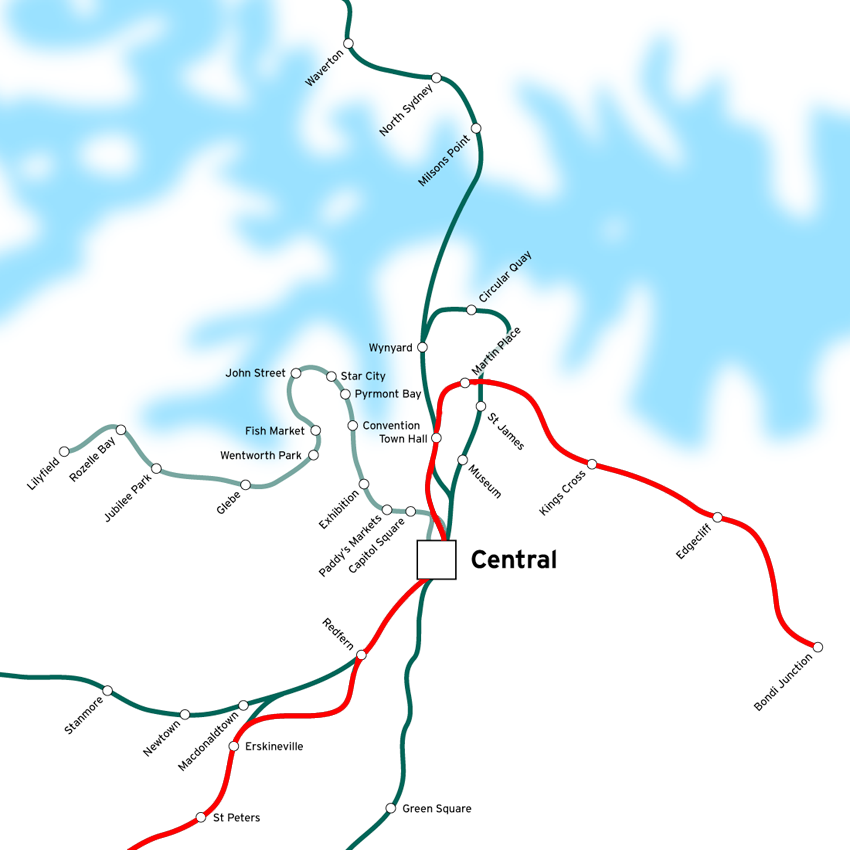
Map of the Eastern Suburbs Line (in red)

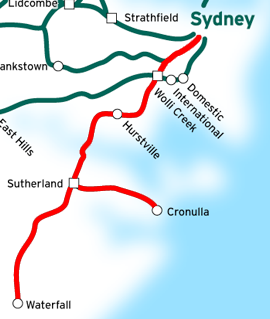
Map of the Illawarra and Cronulla lines (in red)

== History ==
=== Main line construction ===
The Illawarra line route was approved by the New South Wales Government in 1880. This route originated near the inner-city locality of Macdonaldtown and ran to Kiama via the locality of "Bottle Forest", a distance of 109 kilometres (68 mi). The route selected comprises the present-day route of the Macdonaldtown to Waterfall section of the Eastern Suburbs & Illawarra Line. On 6 April 1881, Governor Augustus Loftus assented to Act 44 Vic. No. 28, which provided £1,020,000 for the construction of this railway, and proposed that the first section of 37 kilometres (23 mi), constituting approximately the present suburban route, be completed by 30 September 1884. Almost immediately, concerns were raised about the new route's viability, most specifically over the cost of tunnelling between Waterfall and Otford to reach Wollongong. Work was suspended past the 24-kilometre (15 mi) point at Como, and Government surveyors were instructed to re-survey a route via the Port Hacking River that had originally been surveyed in 1873. Their work allayed concerns about the new route: although the new route had more tunnelling, excavation and sharp curves, the total cost of the "Bottle Forest" route was estimated at £130,175 less than the original Port Hacking route. The Minister for Works eventually agreed on this new route, although construction was again briefly halted when the contractors refused to recommence work on the disputed section. With new contractors hired, the line was complete to Hurstville by 15 October 1884, Waterfall by 9 March 1886, and the whole line to Kiama was opened officially in Wollongong on 22 June 1887.

According to the official papers on the line's construction, when the line first opened for trains between Sydney and Sutherland construction was not quite complete, so excursion services initially ran on weekends only until the entire line was handed over. The first official train ran within the modern-day suburban area on 9 December 1885, although the line was closed once again between December 1885 and January 1886 to permit testing on the new bridge over the Georges River.

=== Amplification and electrification ===
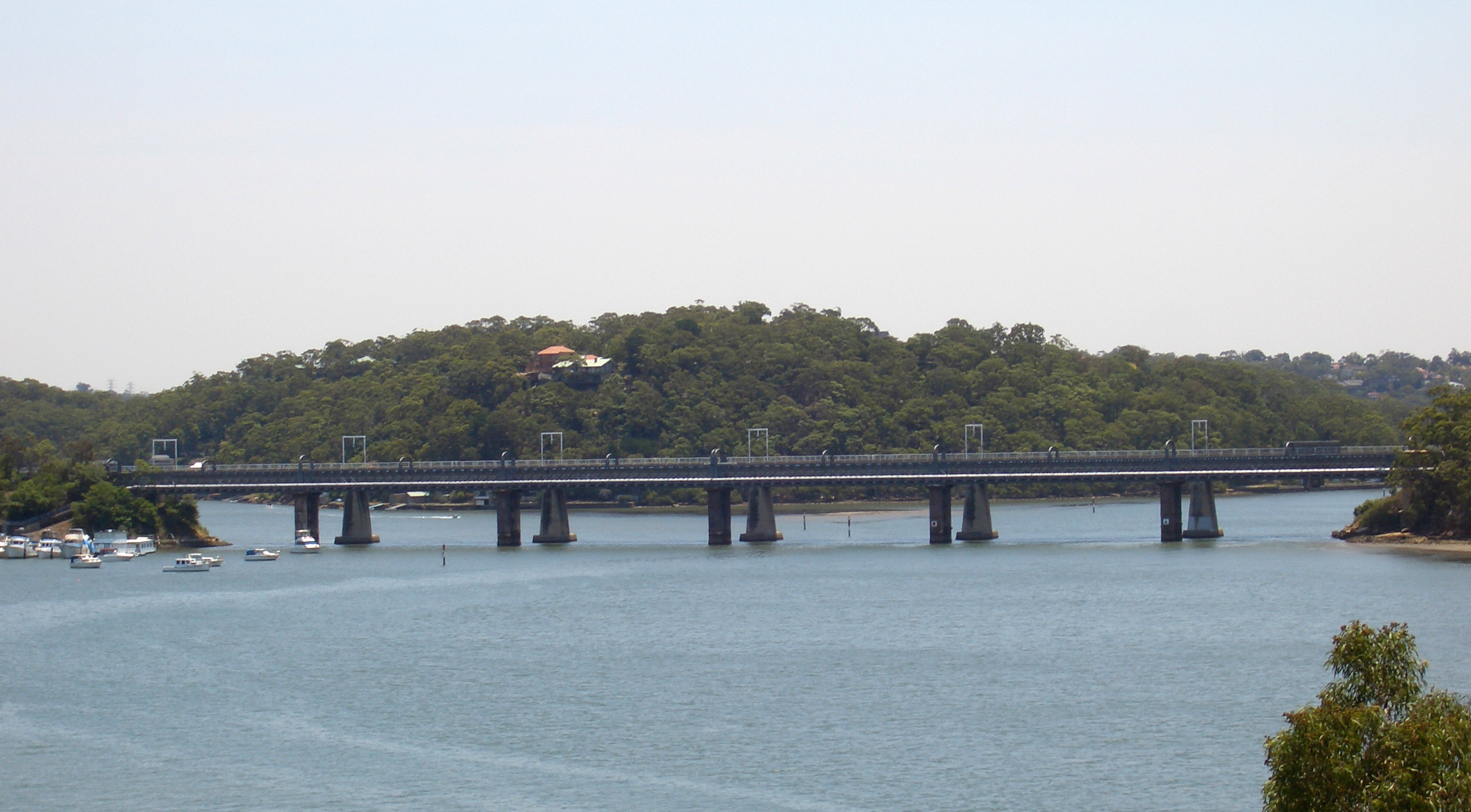
The old and new Como bridges over the Georges River, facing west. The older bridge is in the foreground.

The line was originally constructed as double track between Illawarra Junction and Hurstville with single track thereafter; however, its rising use meant that the line required duplication soon afterwards. The line was duplicated between Hurstville and Loftus Station (with the exception of the Como bridge over the Georges River) in April 1890, then southward to Waterfall by 12 December 1890. The section of track between Illawarra Junction and Hurstville was quadruplicated between 1913 and 1925.

After duplication in 1890, the original lattice-girder Como Bridge across the Georges River was laid as gauntlet track. This arrangement remained in place for many decades, causing a notorious bottleneck on the line, until the New South Wales Government commissioned John Holland & Co to build a new bridge in 1969. Construction of the new bridge, made of prestressed concrete box girders, commenced in 1969 and was first used by the 18:17 service from Como on 19 November 1972. The old bridge, as well as a former alignment of the line between Mortdale and Oatley replaced in 1905, is now used as a rail trail for pedestrians and cyclists.

The Illawarra Line was the first railway electrified in New South Wales, and was built in conjunction with the construction of the City Railway between Central and St James, opening on 1 March 1926, a few months before the line was connected to the new underground railway. By November 1926 the electric overhead had passed Sutherland and continued to the branch line constructed to the Royal National Park. The line between Loftus and Waterfall remained unelectrified until 1980 and was serviced by steam and then diesel railcars.

=== Cronulla branch line ===
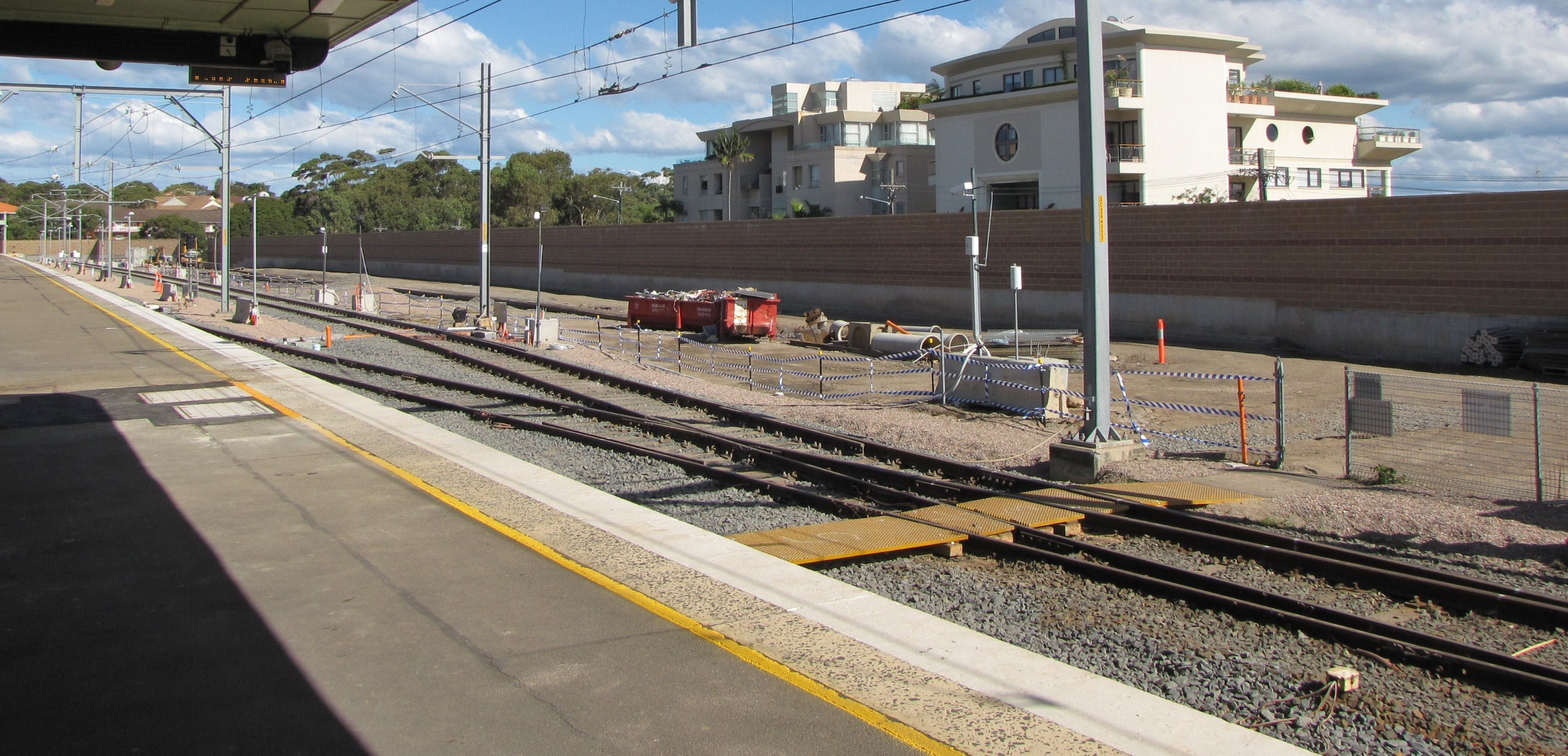
The double length platform on Cronulla station was built to cope with large holiday crowds. The platform was originally designed to accommodate five trains

A single track tramway line, with four stations and a goods siding, was opened on 12 June 1911 at a cost of £37,505. The route commenced at the southern end of Sutherland station, proceeded north-east to the Princes Highway, east along the Kingsway, then south past the site of the present rail terminus to Shelly Park in the centre of Cronulla.

By 1932, the Cronulla tramway had closed. Competing bus services had begun to run with unrestricted competition, and the tram line by this time was so full with services that trams often ran late due to holdups at the crossing loops and passengers missed their connections at Sutherland. The line suffered large losses in its later years, and the effect of the Great Depression at the time forced it to cease its services, the last passenger service operating on 3 August 1931. The goods service continued until 12 January of the next year.

Although the closure of the tramway allowed planning to go ahead for a railway, the planning for the replacement railway line suffered various delays in the 1930s due to funding issues: the line's construction competed with a proposal to electrify the Illawarra Line to Waterfall, and there were disputes over the point at which the line would connect to the main line. Two early proposals to join the line at Como and north of Sutherland Station were rejected. Despite the delays, Parliament finally gave approval to the line on 2 March 1936, and a route with five new stations was surveyed that would connect with the main line at the southern side of Sutherland station. The new line was opened on 16 December 1939.

Although a crossing loop was installed at Caringbah Station and Gymea Station when the line was opened, the single track line prevented the expansion of services to the Cronulla peninsula, and so in the 1980s, it was decided to duplicate a 3.5-kilometre (2.2 mi) section of the line between Gymea and Caringbah, with Gymea, Miranda and Caringbah all receiving island platforms. The new section was opened on 15 July 1985. In the 2000s, the remaining single track sections were duplicated. These opened on 19 April 2010.

=== Eastern Suburbs Railway ===
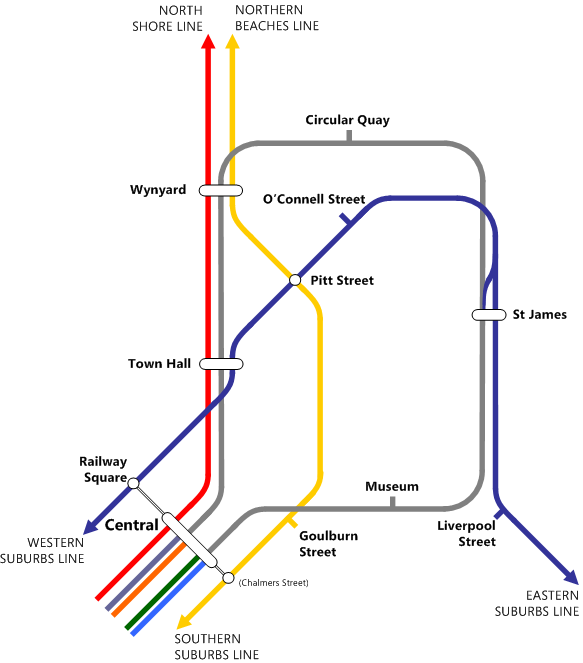
The original railway network for the Sydney CBD planned by John Bradfield. The Eastern Suburbs line is drawn in blue.

In 1916, a plan for the city railways, and an Eastern Suburbs extension was drawn up by the Chief Engineer of the Metropolitan Railway Construction, John Bradfield. It was given subsequent approval by Parliament. Bradfield's plan entailed building a City Circle loop, with an extension through to the Eastern Suburbs by means of a viaduct over Woolloomooloo. The line was to extend to Rosebery and Waterloo, with ten stations, linking with the Illawarra Line near Erskineville station.

Upon the passing of the City and Suburban Electric Railways (Amendment) Act in 1947, construction finally commenced on a variation of the Bradfield's proposal. Two lines would be built: one proceeding on a viaduct out to Kings Cross, then eventually to Bondi Beach. Another line would head from St James via Taylor Square and the Sydney Cricket Ground, extending to Kingsford, with a proposal to extend from Taylor Square to Coogee. Construction commenced on sites around Central station but ceased in 1952 due to a recession. Work remained abandoned for over a decade.

In 1967, construction again commenced on yet another variation on Bradfield's design. This involved the earlier route used towards Bondi Junction through Woolloomooloo, then an extension towards Kingsford with five extra stations at Charing Cross, Frenchmans Road, Randwick, University and Kingsford. The New South Wales Government awarded the contract for the civil and structural design to the successful Snowy Mountains Hydro-Electric Authority. An official Legislative Assembly inquiry in 1976, however, recommended that costs on the project be cut, and the extension to Kingsford, a proposed station at Woollahra, and the expansion of concourse areas at Bondi Junction and Martin Place stations did not proceed. Nonetheless, it was resolved to fully integrate the railway with the Illawarra line. The Eastern Suburbs Railway opened between Central station and Bondi Junction on 23 June 1979. Initially, trains ran as shuttle services between Central and Bondi Junction; it was not until a year later that work was finished to integrate the lines. A double-track junction with the Illawarra Line at Erskineville south of Illawarra Junction, twin single track tunnels connecting to the Eastern Suburbs Railway platforms at Central, a set of underground platforms at Redfern and a turnback tunnel at Martin Place opened to complete the project on 20 July 1980.

Bondi Junction had originally been intended only as an intermediate turnback station before the extension to Kingsford was abandoned. As part of the Rail Clearways Program, the $77 million Bondi Junction Turnback project saw a new rail crossover was built between the single-track tunnels, enabling 20 trains an hour, up from 14, to use the station. The work was completed in time for the introduction of a new timetable on 28 May 2006.

== Operation ==
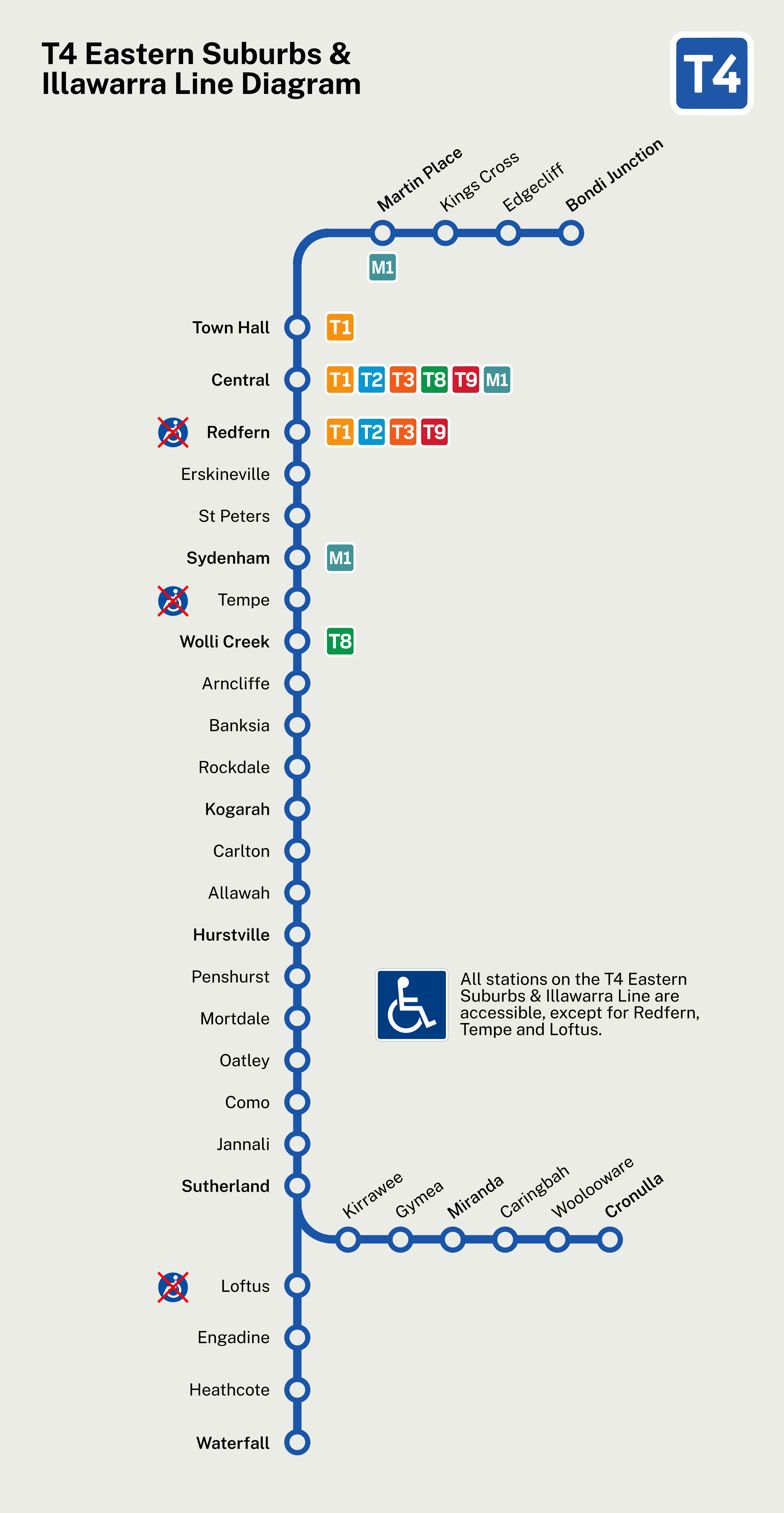
Route diagram of T4 Eastern Suburbs & Illawarra Line

=== Rolling stock ===
- New South Wales T set 8-car EMUs
- New South Wales H set 4/8-car EMUs
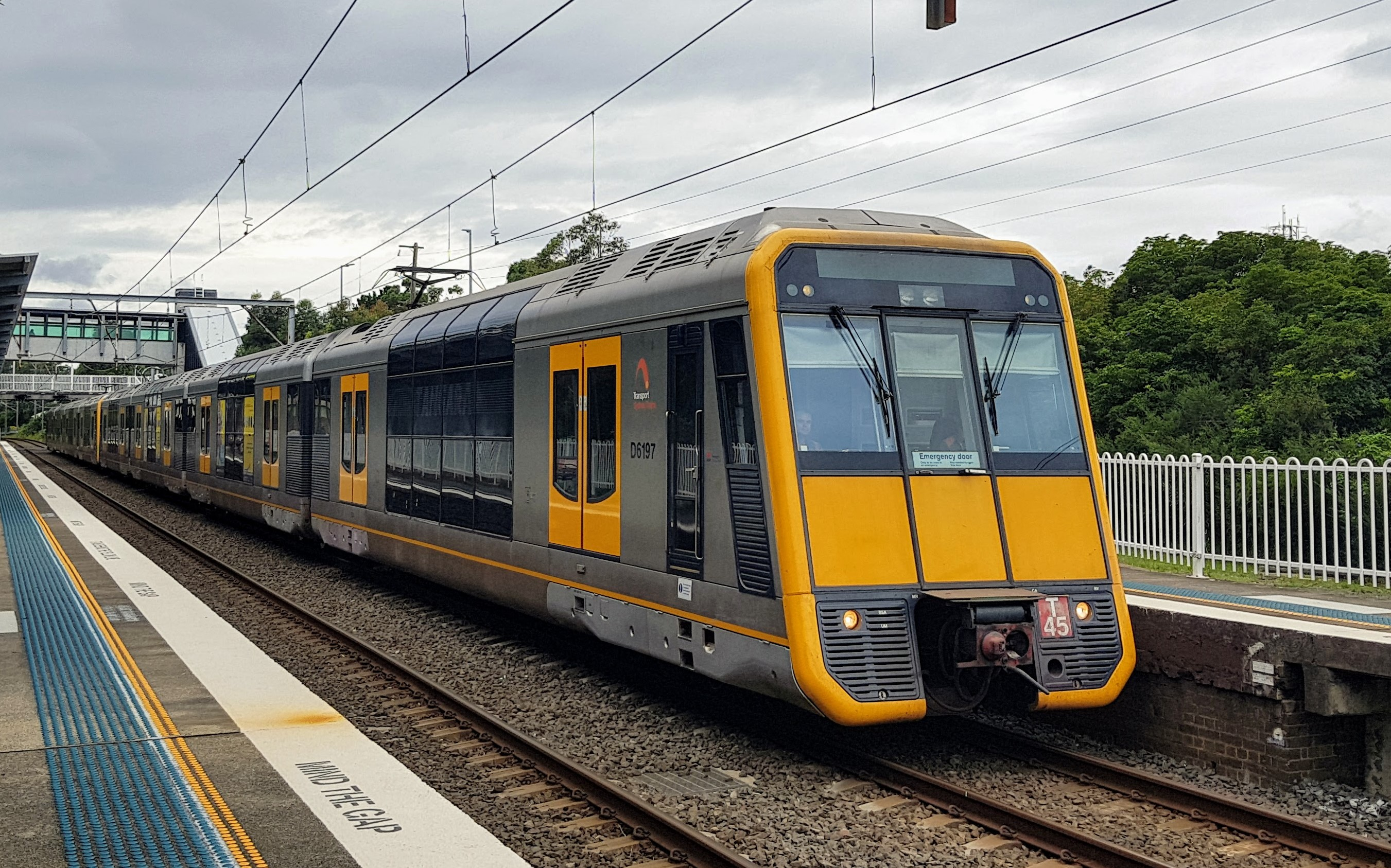
Tangara T sets

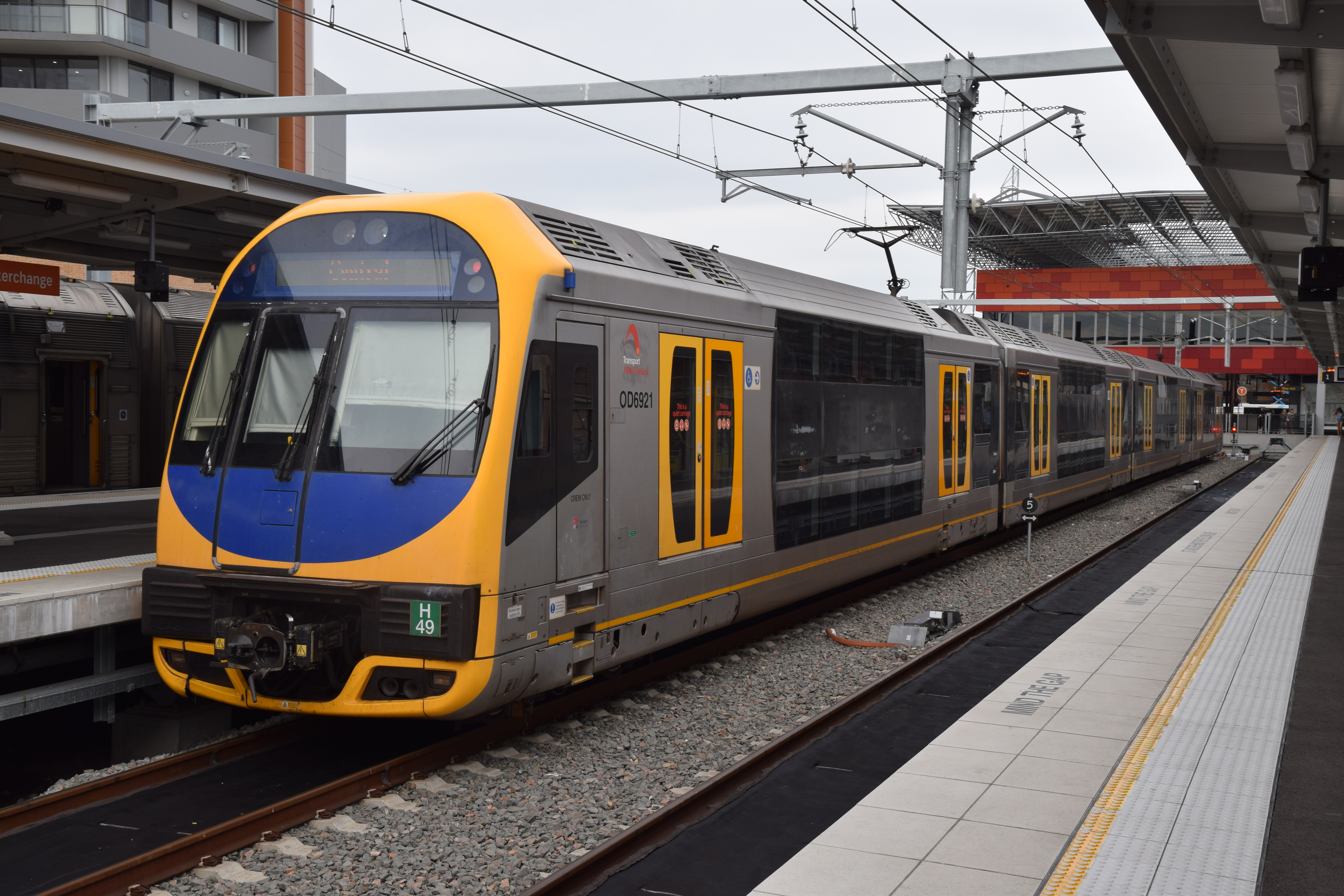
Oscar H sets

=== Trains ===
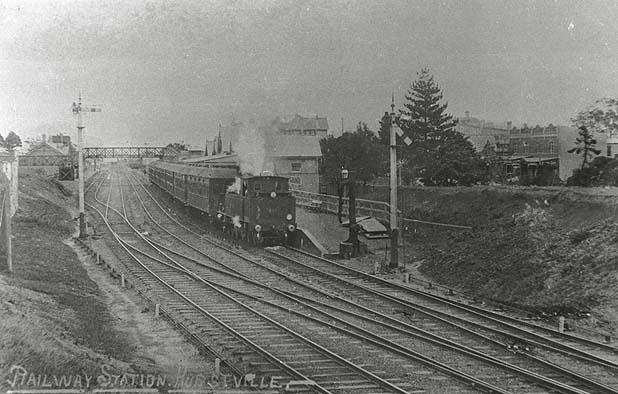
A steam service stands at Hurstville c. 1910. This was typical of the services on the line before the introduction of electric services.

In addition to Eastern Suburbs & Illawarra Line trains, the Illawarra railway line carries interurban and freight traffic. The Cronulla branch line and the Eastern Suburbs Railway are exclusively used by passenger trains.

Historically, passenger services were provided to the Sydney Central by steam locomotives. The first services to Hurstville were run by steam locomotives of the Q.158 and R.285 classes. When the City Underground opened to St James in 1926, a new electric service was provided to run there. From the time when the line to the Royal National Park was electrified, passengers received a steam train service at first, then when this became expensive, it was replaced by a rail motor service. This arrangement continued until the line was electrified to Waterfall, and the Eastern Suburbs Line was opened. In 1979, the Eastern Suburbs Line being the first line to only use S set double-decker rolling stock. The current running operations for passenger services have remained generally unchanged since 1981 with the integration of the Illawarra line and the Eastern Suburbs Railway. Suburban services utilise Erskineville Junction and proceed to Central and Bondi Junction.

The last S sets were withdrawn from Mortdale Maintenance Depot in March 2013; all services now mostly provided by Tangara sets with occasionally OSCAR sets (as the infrastructure and electrical requirements of newer models are incompatible with the line). Trains typically operate with 12 services per hour in peak, six services per hour in off-peak, and four to six services per hour on weekends and public holidays.

=== Map ===
T4 interactive map

=== Stations ===
The line currently has 34 operating stations and one station opening in 2029. Only three stations or platforms have closed, the two stations on the Royal National Park Branch (the main station, which closed in 1991, and the platform for the Scout's Camp, which closed in 1947), and the station on the Woronora Cemetery branch, which also closed in 1947

| Name | Distance from Central (km) | Opened | Railway line | Serving suburbs | Other lines |
Bondi Junction – Sutherland
| Bondi Junction | 6.76 | 1979 | Eastern Suburbs | Bondi Junction | none |
| Woollahra | 5.3 | 2029 | Eastern Suburbs | Woollahra | none |
| Edgecliff | 4.82 | 1979 | Eastern Suburbs | Edgecliff, Darling Point | none |
| Kings Cross | 3.41 | 1979 | Eastern Suburbs | Kings Cross, Rushcutters Bay | none |
| Martin Place | 2.10 | 1979 | Eastern Suburbs | Sydney CBD | M1 Metro North West & Bankstown Line |
| Town Hall | 1.21 | 1932 | Eastern Suburbs | Sydney, Darling Harbour | T1 North Shore & Western Line T2 Leppington & Inner West Line T3 Liverpool & Inner West Line T8 Airport & South Line T9 Northern Line |
| Central (underground) | 0 | 1979 | Eastern Suburbs | Central, Strawberry Hills; Ultimo, Surry Hills, Haymarket | T1 North Shore & Western Line T2 Leppington & Inner West Line T3 Liverpool & Inner West Line T8 Airport & South Line T9 Northern Line M1 Metro North West & Bankstown Line |
| Redfern (underground) | 1.32 | 1980 | Illawarra Relief | Redfern, Waterloo, Darlington; The University of Sydney | T1 North Shore & Western Line T2 Leppington & Inner West Line T3 Liverpool & Inner West Line T8 Airport & South Line T9 Northern Line |
| Sydenham | 5.30 | 1884 | Sydenham, Marrickville, St Peters | T8 Airport & South Line M1 Metro North West & Bankstown Line | |
| Tempe | 6.84 | 1884 | Tempe, Undercliffe (Earlwood) | none | |
| Wolli Creek | 7.30 | 2000 | Wolli Creek, Arncliffe | T8 Airport & South Line | |
| Arncliffe | 8.42 | 1884 | Arncliffe | none | |
| Banksia | 9.60 | 1906 | Banksia, Arncliffe, Rockdale | none | |
| Rockdale | 10.41 | 1884 | Rockdale, Bexley | none | |
| Kogarah | 11.61 | 1884 | Kogarah, Bexley | none | |
| Carlton | 12.74 | 1887 | Carlton, Bexley | none | |
| Allawah | 13.69 | 1925 | Allawah | none | |
| Hurstville | 14.84 | 1884 | Hurstville, Hurstville South | none | |
| Penshurst | 16.12 | 1886 | Penshurst | none | |
| Mortdale | 17.06 | 1897 | Mortdale | none | |
| Oatley | 18.28 | 1886 | Oatley | none | |
| Como | 21.24 | 1885 | Como, Como West | none | |
| Jannali | 22.22 | 1931 | Jannali | none | |
| Sutherland | 24.46 | 1885 | Sutherland | none | |
Sutherland – Waterfall
| Loftus | 26.29 | 1886 | Illawarra | Loftus, Yarrawarrah | none |
| Engadine | 30.75 | 1920 | Illawarra | Engadine, Woronora Heights | none |
| Heathcote | 33.15 | 1886 | Illawarra | Heathcote | none |
| Waterfall | 38.74 | 1886 | Illawarra | Waterfall | none |
| Helensburgh | 46.4 | 1889 | South Coast | Helensburgh | |
Sutherland – Cronulla
| Kirrawee | 26.64 | 1939 | Cronulla | Kirrawee | none |
| Gymea | 27.94 | 1939 | Cronulla | Gymea | none |
| Miranda | 29.51 | 1939 | Cronulla | Miranda | none |
| Caringbah | 31.51 | 1939 | Cronulla | Caringbah | none |
| Woolooware | 33.60 | 1939 | Cronulla | Woolooware | none |
| Cronulla | 34.81 | 1939 | Cronulla | Cronulla | none |

=== Stopping patterns ===
The stopping patterns on the Eastern Suburbs & Illawarra Line have generally been determined by several different termini. The steam era saw these termini change quite frequently as more terminating facilities were constructed: the first trains on the line after the Waterfall extension in 1887 either ran to Hurstville (16 per day), Sutherland (two per day) and Waterfall (two per day), with all trains stopping at every intermediate station. By 1907, however, Como and Oatley had been added to the list of termini, with nine and seven trains per day respectively. Seven trains per day at this time also ran to Sutherland, and one to Waterfall. Most trains terminated at Hurstville.

Since electrification, the terminus stations for suburban trains have remained consistent. From 1926 trains terminated at either Hurstville, Sutherland and The National Park. With the opening of the Cronulla branch in 1939, Cronulla become the fourth major terminus. In 1980 Waterfall was electrified and replaced the station: The Royal National Park as a terminus, having been served by a diesel-operated shuttle service until then.

- ● – All trains stop
- ◐ – Some services do not stop
- ▼ – Only outbound trains stop
- ▲ – Only inbound trains stop
- | – Trains do not stop

T4 Services
| Station | Waterfall Off Peak | Waterfall Peak | Helensburgh | Hurstville | Sutherland | Cronulla Off Peak | Cronulla Peak (1) | Cronulla Peak (2) | | |
|---|---|---|---|---|---|---|---|---|---|---|
| Bondi Junction | ● | ● | ● | ● | ● | ● | ● | ● | | |
| Edgecliff | ● | ● | ● | ● | ● | ● | ● | ● | | |
| Kings Cross | ● | ● | ● | ● | ● | ● | ● | ● | | |
| Martin Place | ● | ● | ● | ● | ● | ● | ● | ● | | |
| Town Hall | ● | ● | ● | ● | ● | ● | ● | ● | | |
| Central | ● | ● | ● | ● | ● | ● | ● | ● | | |
| Redfern | ● | ● | ● | ● | ● | ● | ● | ● | | |
| Erskineville | | | | | | | | | | |
| St Peters | | | | | | | | | | |
| Sydenham | ● | | | | | ● | ● | ● | | | ▲ |
| Tempe | ● | | | | | ● | ● | | | | | | |
| Wolli Creek | ● | ● | ● | ● | ● | ● | ● | ● | | |
| Arncliffe | ● | | | | | ● | ● | | | | | | |
| Banksia | ● | | | | | ● | ● | | | | | | |
| Rockdale | ● | | | | | ● | ● | ● | | | | |
| Kogarah | ● | | | | | ● | ● | ● | | | | |
| Carlton | ● | | | | | ● | ● | ◐ | | | | |
| Allawah | ● | | | | | ● | ● | ◐ | | | | |
| Hurstville | ● | ● | ● | ● | ● | ● | ● | ● | | |
| Penshurst | ● | ◐ | ▼ | | | | ◐ | | | ● | | |
| Mortdale | ● | ◐ | ▼ | | | | ◐ | | | ● | | |
| Oatley | ◐ | ◐ | ▲ | | | | ● | ▼ | ● | | |
| Como | ◐ | ◐ | | | | | | ◐ | | | ● | | |
| Jannali | ● | ● | ▲ | | | | ● | ▼ | ● | | |
| Sutherland | ● | ● | ● | | ● | ● | ● | ● | | |
| Kirrawee | | | | | | ● | ● | ● | | |
| Gymea | | | | | | ● | ● | ● | | |
| Miranda | | | | | | ● | ● | ● | | |
| Caringbah | | | | | | ● | ● | ● | | |
| Woolooware | | | | | | ● | ● | ● | | |
| Cronulla | | | | | | ● | ● | ● | | |
| Loftus | ● | ● | ▼ | | | | | | | |
| Engadine | ● | ● | ▼ | | | | | | | |
| Heathcote | ● | ● | ▼ | | | | | | | |
| Waterfall | ● | ● | ● | | | | | | | |
| Helensburgh | | | ● | | | | | | | |

=== Patronage ===
The following table shows the patronage of Sydney Trains network for the calendar year 2025.

2025–26 Sydney Trains patronage by line (Note: Figures based on Opal tap on and tap off data)
| T1 North Shore & Western Line | 79,173,811 | |
| T2 Leppington & Inner West Line | 56,339,459 | |
| T3 Liverpool & Inner West Line | 11,756,216 | (Note: T3 patronage split between former route via Bankstown and current route via Strathfield. The Bankstown route closed 30 September 2024.) |
| T4 Eastern Suburbs & Illawarra Line | 63,990,365 | |
| T5 Cumberland Line | 7,629,714 | |
| T6 Lidcombe & Bankstown Line | 3,307,374 | |
| Olympic Park railway line | 2,400,479 | |
| T8 Airport & South Line | 54,235,162 | |
| T9 Northern Line | 39,379,659 | |

== Performance ==
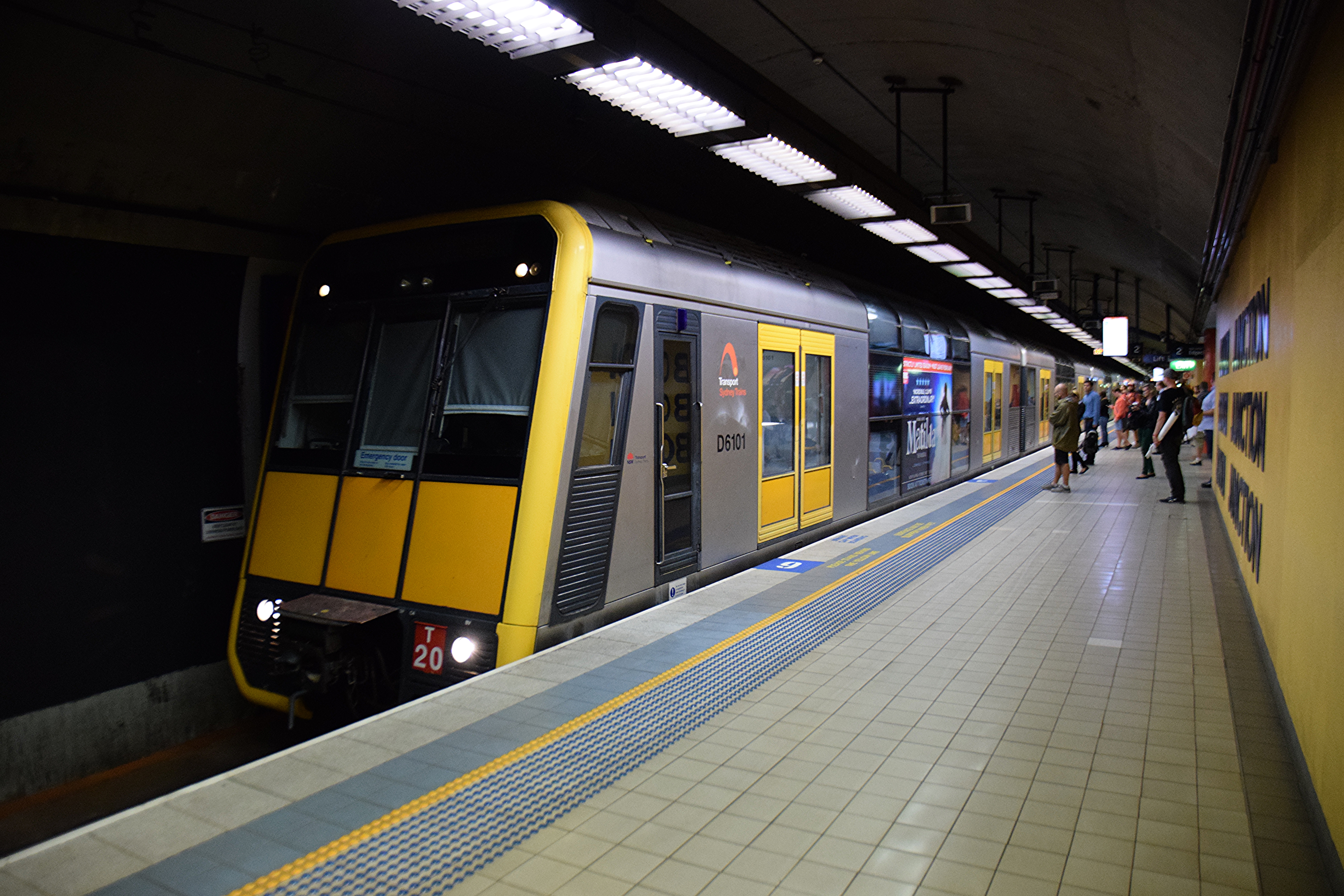
A service at Bondi Junction station

In 2009–2010, 97.65% of all Eastern Suburbs and Illawarra services ran on-time, ranking it the most reliable line on the CityRail network. In the 2019–2020 financial year, this figure was 95.2%.

Planning experts recognised a need to expand capacity on the Eastern Suburbs Line. In 2002, former CityRail chairman Ron Christie released a report, the "Long-term strategic plan for rail", which outlined the critical infrastructure that would need to be built between then and 2050 to ensure the long-term survival and operation of the CityRail network. The report highlighted the problems facing the network at that time and noted that capacity on Illawarra Line trains was often at 120%, and that 180% was not unexpected. Christie said that by 2011 there would be no capacity on the Eastern Suburbs Line for trains coming from the Illawarra Line. To address this, the NSW Government constructed the Bondi Junction Turnback, which enables an additional six trains per hour to terminate at the station. To take advantage of the new infrastructure, a new timetable was introduced in May 2006 which reduced the overcrowding.

A second project, the full duplication of the Cronulla branch line, was completed in 2010. This increases the capacity of the branch line from four to eight trains per hour. The line between Oatley, Sutherland and Cronulla also received signalling upgrades to allow more services to run at shorter intervals. A new timetable with extra services was introduced on 10 October 2010.

It was proposed in the 2007 NSW State Plan that by 2017, the line capacity between Hurstville and Sutherland will be amplified to allow extra services to and from Cronulla, as well as for services accessing the Mortdale Maintenance Centre. The 2010 Metropolitan Transport Plan made no mention of the project. As of 2021, this project had not taken place but in August 2020, the New South Wales Government had announced an alternative project, the installation of a new rail crossover at Hurstville that would enable 20% more services in peak hour. The crossover project is planned to be completed by 2022.

In October 2026, as part of the Rail Service Improvement Program, the NSW Government announced that the line would undergo a significant timetable change in November 2026, which will improve train frequency whilst resulting in slower journeys due to extra stops on some services and capacity constraints on the line. It was expected that this timetable would improve service reliability by "untangling" the lines. However later that month the government announced they would be scrapping the planned timetable changes due to criticism over longer journey times from some areas.

== Metro and light rail proposals ==
Over the years, there have been a number of proposals to replace/supplement all/part of the Illawarra line with metro/light rail services. None of these have eventuated, as of 2023.

- Co-ordinator General of the state's rail industry Ron Christie's "Long-term strategic plan for rail" report issued in 2001, suggested that several "metro" lines be built to service new areas and to relieve capacity on existing lines. These included a metro line to supplement the Illawarra Line. The route would go from Cronulla to Miranda along the existing tracks, then along a reserved corridor for the F6 Southern Freeway up to Sydney Airport. The line would then extend to the Sydney CBD then to Sydney's Northern Beaches via Chatswood. Christie suggested that even if the entire line were not to be built, the first stage between Cronulla, the Airport and the City would provide "essential capacity relief" for the Illawarra line which would be "severely capacity-constrained" within two decades. Both heavy rail and light rail were mooted as alternatives.
- Christie was not the only person to suggest the F6 Corridor as an alternative. In 2002, the then Minister for Transport Carl Scully officially abandoned the corridor, reserved since 1951 for the extension of the Southern Freeway north to St Peters, and suggested that light rail, bus-only roads or high-frequency train services could run on the corridor. He wished to encourage innovative public transport solutions in the area, while maintaining the green space available near Botany Bay. The plan received support from environmental groups, with environmental transport group EcoTransit proposing their own 25.5 km (15.8 mi) light rail line to supplement the Illawarra Line on the reservation, called the "Bay Light Express".
- Since 2005, however, the future of an alternative corridor was in doubt, with the then State Treasurer Michael Costa announcing that the corridor would again be reserved for a motorway. By 2019, construction of the first stage of the M6 Motorway had been approved for part of the corridor, between Arncliffe and Kogarah.
- In 2012, when the new Sydney Metro Northwest was announced, it was proposed that at a later date the line would be extended across Sydney Harbour and then split between Bankstown and Hurstville on the Illawarra line. However subsequent plans no longer mention the Illawarra Line.

== See also ==
Operators and companies connected to the line

- Sydney Trains – operator of services on the line.
- Transport Infrastructure Development Corporation – State-owned corporation constructing the upgrade to the Cronulla Line.

Other railways in the area

- Illawarra line – connects to the line at its southern end.
- Trams in Sydney – details on other tramway services in the Southern Suburbs of Sydney in the 19th and early 20th centuries.

General articles on railways in Sydney

- List of Sydney railway stations
- Railways in Sydney
- Rail transport in New South Wales
- Sydney underground railways – other underground lines in Sydney
