= Jannali railway station =

Railway station in Sydney, New South Wales, Australia

Jannali
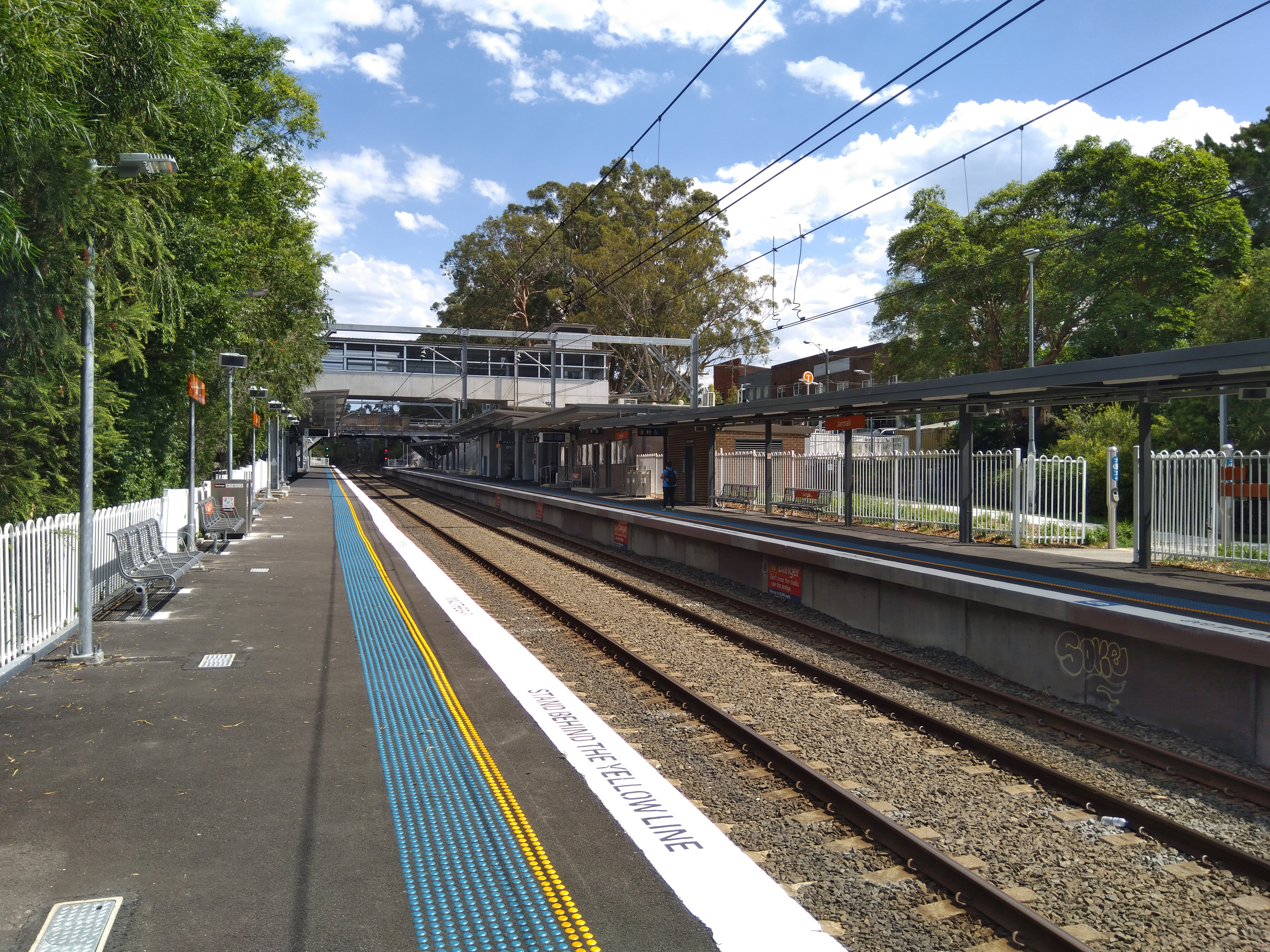
- Northbound view from Platform 2 in January 2018

General information
- Location: Railway Crescent, Jannali; Sydney, New South Wales; Australia
- Coordinates: 34°00′58″S 151°03′52″E
- Elevation: 74 metres (243 ft)
- Owner: Transport Asset Manager of NSW
- Operator: Sydney Trains
- Line: South Coast
- Distance: 22.72 km (14.12 mi) from Central
- Platforms: 2 (2 side)
- Tracks: 2
- Connections: Bus

Construction
- Structure type: Ground
- Accessible: Yes

Other information
- Status: Weekdays: Staffed: 6am to 7pm: Weekends and public holidays: Staffed: 8am to 4pm
- Website: Transport for NSW

History
- Opened: 7 February 1931 (95 years ago)
- Electrified: Yes (from opening)

Passengers
- 2025: 1,214,480 (year); 3,327 (daily) (Sydney Trains)
- Rank: 115

Services
Preceding station	Sydney Trains	Following station
Sutherland towards Waterfall or Cronulla	Eastern Suburbs & Illawarra Line	Como towards Bondi Junction
Location

Jannali railway station is a suburban railway station located on the South Coast line, serving the Sydney suburb of Jannali. It is served by Sydney Trains T4 Eastern Suburbs & Illawarra Line services.

== History ==
Jannali station opened on 7 February 1931. The development was requested and largely funded by Sutherland Shire Council. The road bridge over the railway at Jannali was constructed at the same time as the station.

A minor upgrade was completed in April 2013. Improvements included redesigning and rebuilding the ramp on the western side of the station and upgrading the footpath on the eastern side of the station.

The station received a more substantial upgrade in 2017, when a footbridge with lifts was built.

== Services ==
=== Platforms ===
Platform	Line	Stopping pattern	Notes
1	T4	services to Bondi Junction	
2	T4	services to Cronulla & Waterfall	

=== Transport links ===
U-Go Mobility operates two bus routes via Jannali station, under contract to Transport for NSW:

- 967: Westfield Miranda to Oyster Bay & Como West
- 968: Westfield Miranda to Kareela & Bonnet Bay
