= Bexley, New South Wales =

Bexley
- Suburb
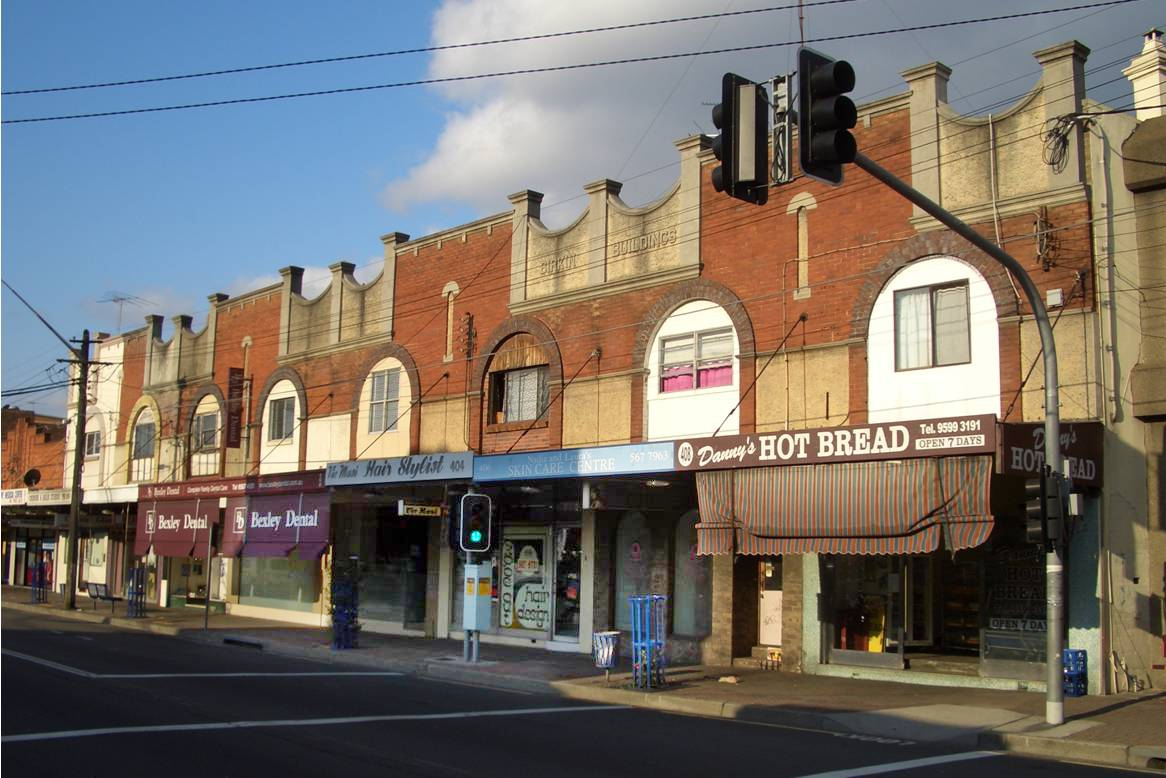
- Forest Road, Bexley

- Interactive map of Bexley
- Country: Australia
- State: New South Wales
- City: Sydney
- LGA: Bayside Council
- Location: 14 km (8.7 mi) south-west of Sydney CBD
- Established: 1822

Government
  - State electorates: Kogarah; Rockdale
  - Federal division: Barton
- Elevation: 62 m (203 ft)

Population
  - Total: 19,646 (2021 census)
- Postcode: 2207
Suburbs around Bexley
Bexley North	Bardwell Valley	Arncliffe
Kingsgrove	Bexley	Rockdale
Hurstville	Carlton	Kogarah

Bexley is a suburb in southern Sydney, in the state of New South Wales, Australia. Bexley is located 14 kilometres (8.7 mi) south-west of the Sydney central business district, in the local government area of the Bayside Council and is part of the St George area.

== Commercial area ==
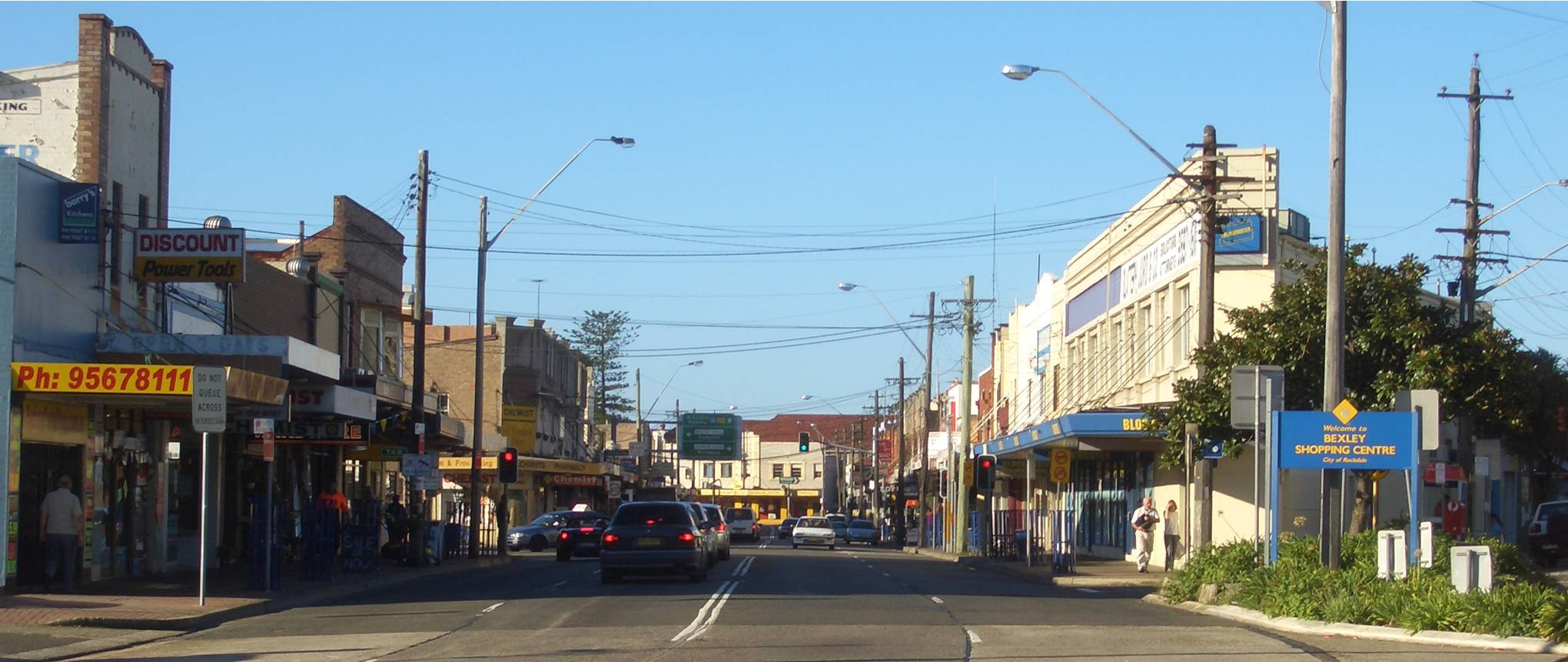
Bexley Shopping Centre

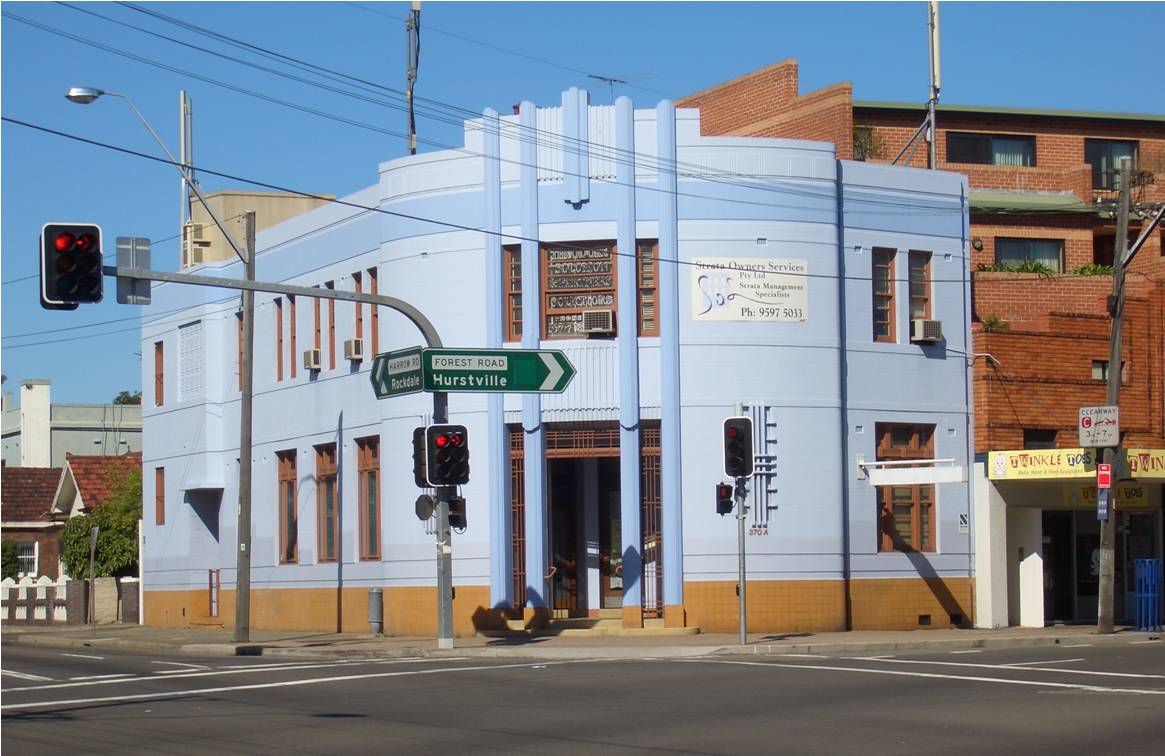
Former Commonwealth Bank, Forest Road

== Transport ==
Bexley is currently served by Transit Systems and U-Go Mobility bus services. A steam tramway opened on 13 October 1909 and operated from Arncliffe railway station via Firth and Done Streets and then onto Wollongong, Forest and Stoney Creek Roads to Bexley Park, near Preddys Road. It closed on 1 January 1927.

== Population ==
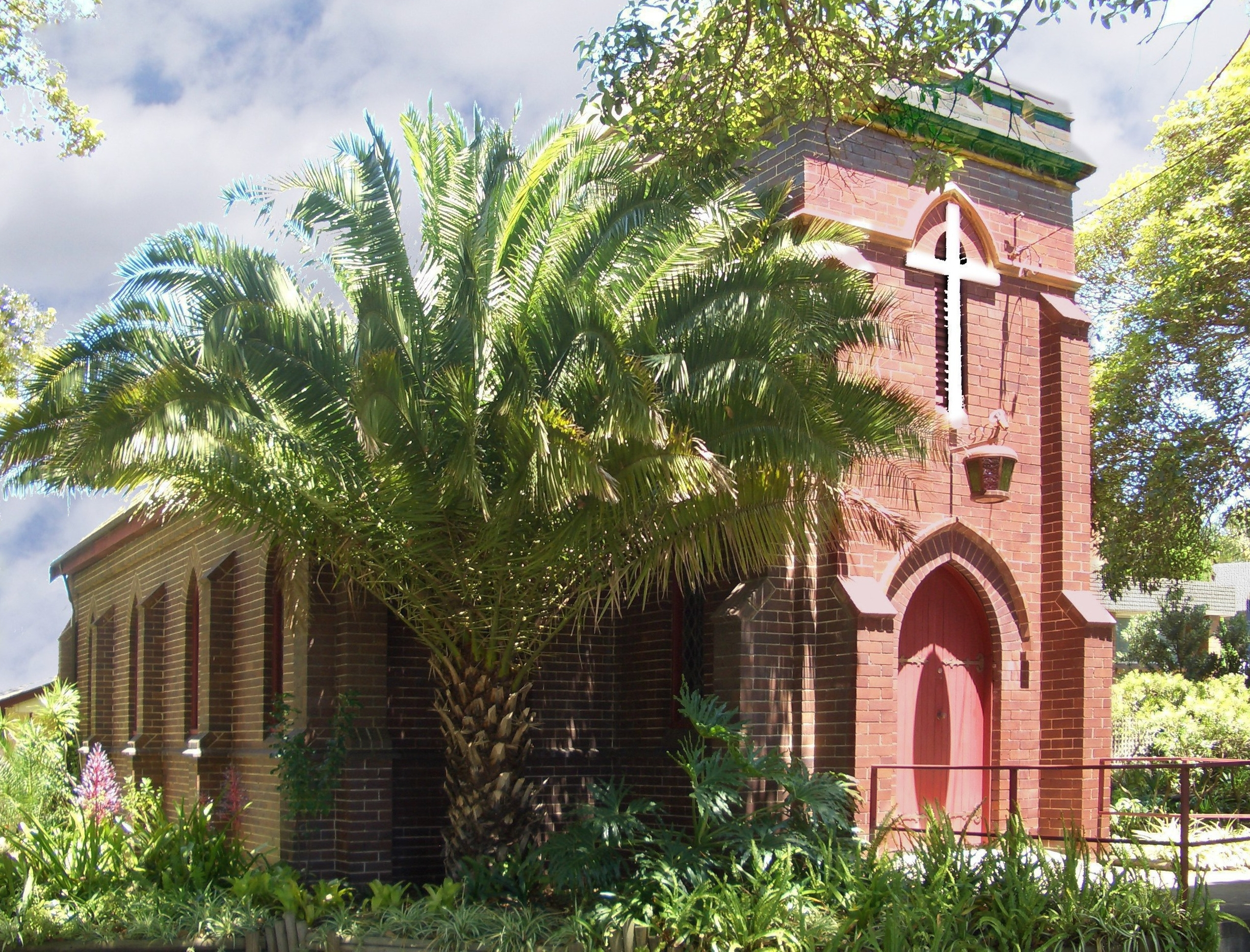
Bexley Congregational Fellowship church designed by Harry Foskett

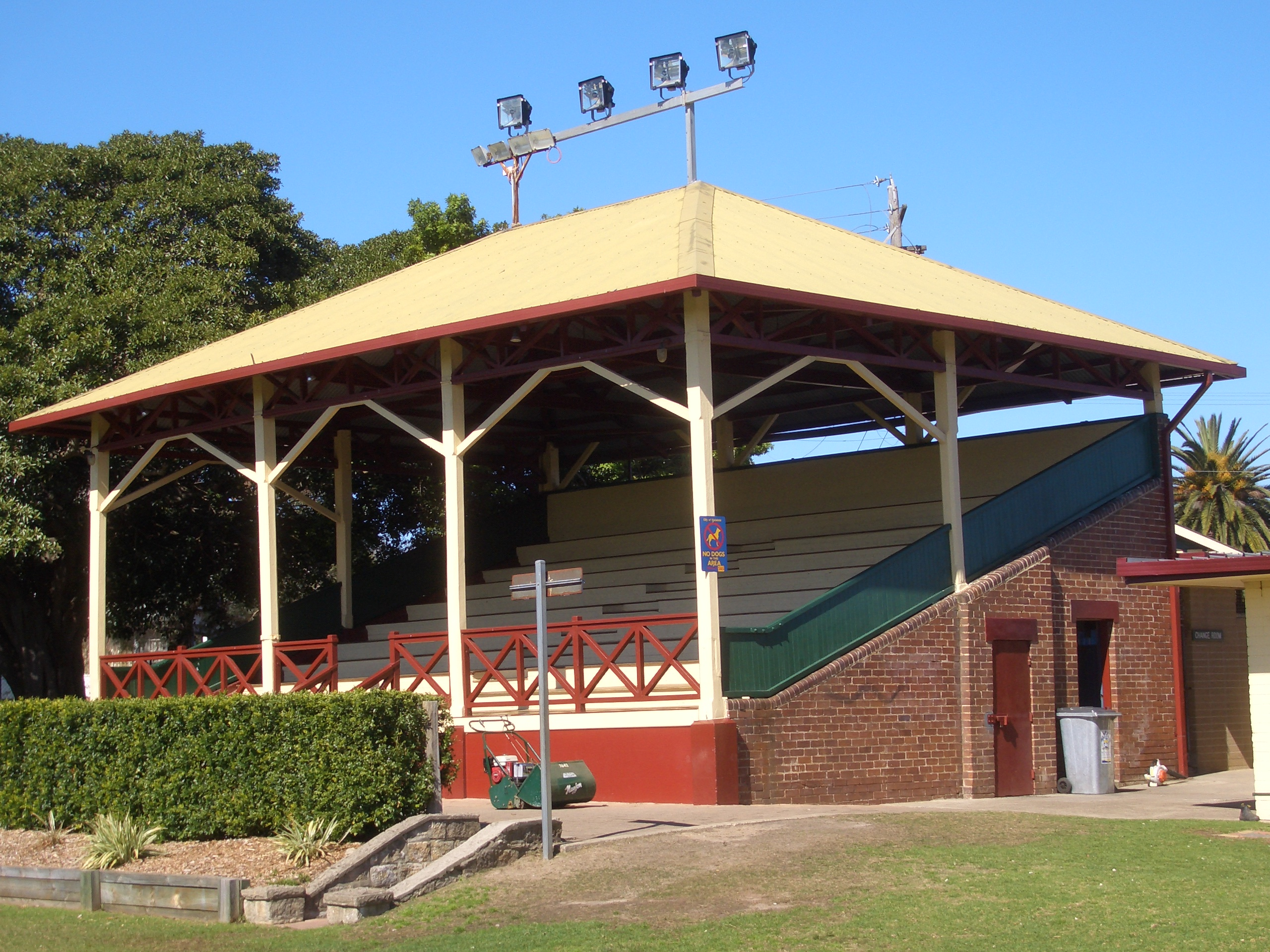
Bexley Park Grandstand

According to the 2021 census of Population, there were 19,646 people usually resident in Bexley. 52.7% of people were born in Australia. The next most common countries of birth were China 6.7%, Lebanon 5.3%, Macedonia 3.8%, Greece 2.9% and Philippines 1.8%. 38.2% of people only spoke English at home. Other languages spoken at home included Arabic 13.2%, Greek 7.1%, Macedonian 6.3%, Mandarin 6.0% and Cantonese 5.1%. The most common responses were Catholic 20.9%, No Religion 19.9%, Islam 16.3% and Eastern Orthodox 16.1%.

=== Notable residents ===
- Patricia Carlon - crime fiction/thriller writer
- Richard White - tech billionaire

== Gallery ==
=== Houses ===
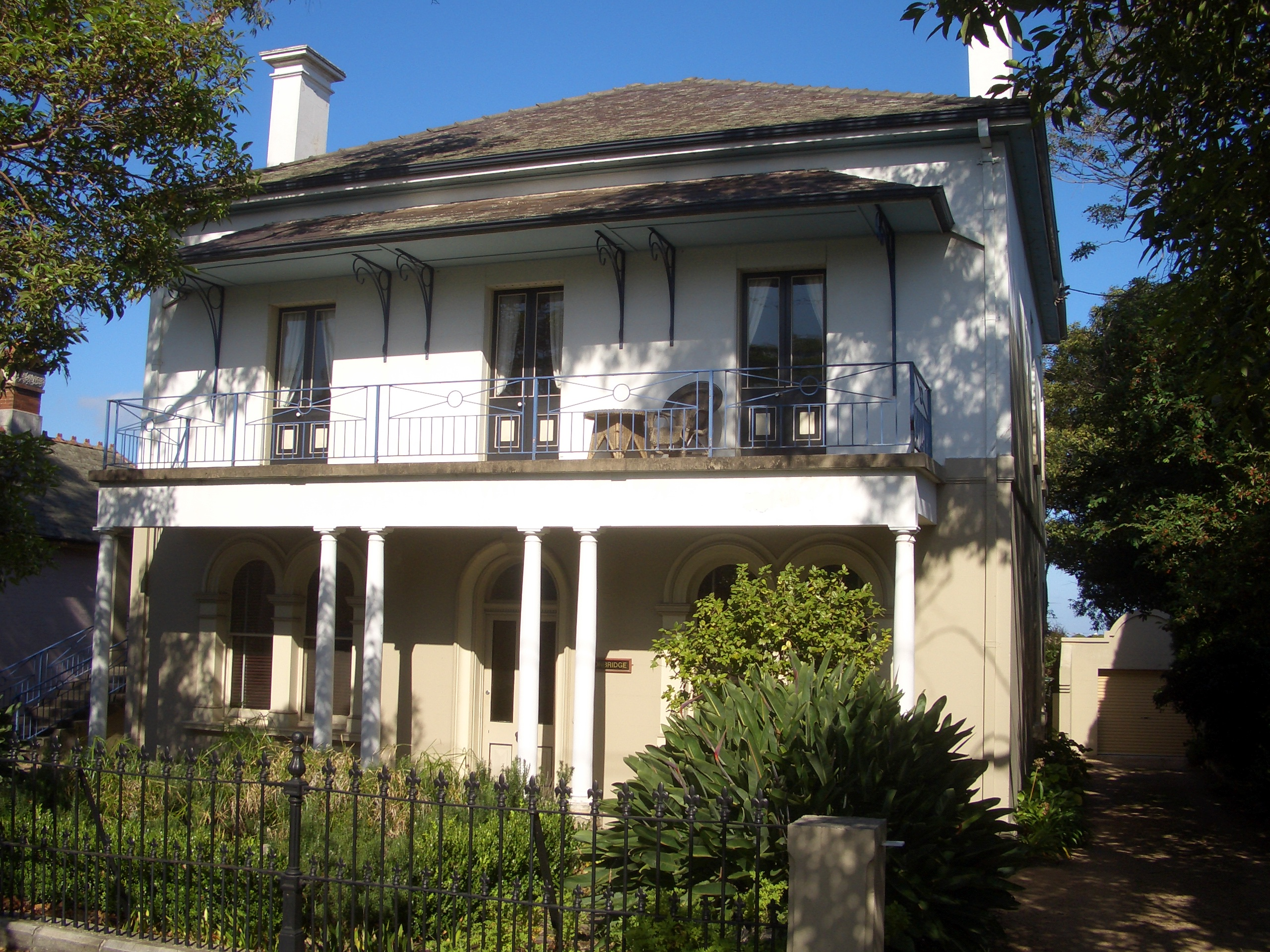
Two-storey home, Gladstone Street

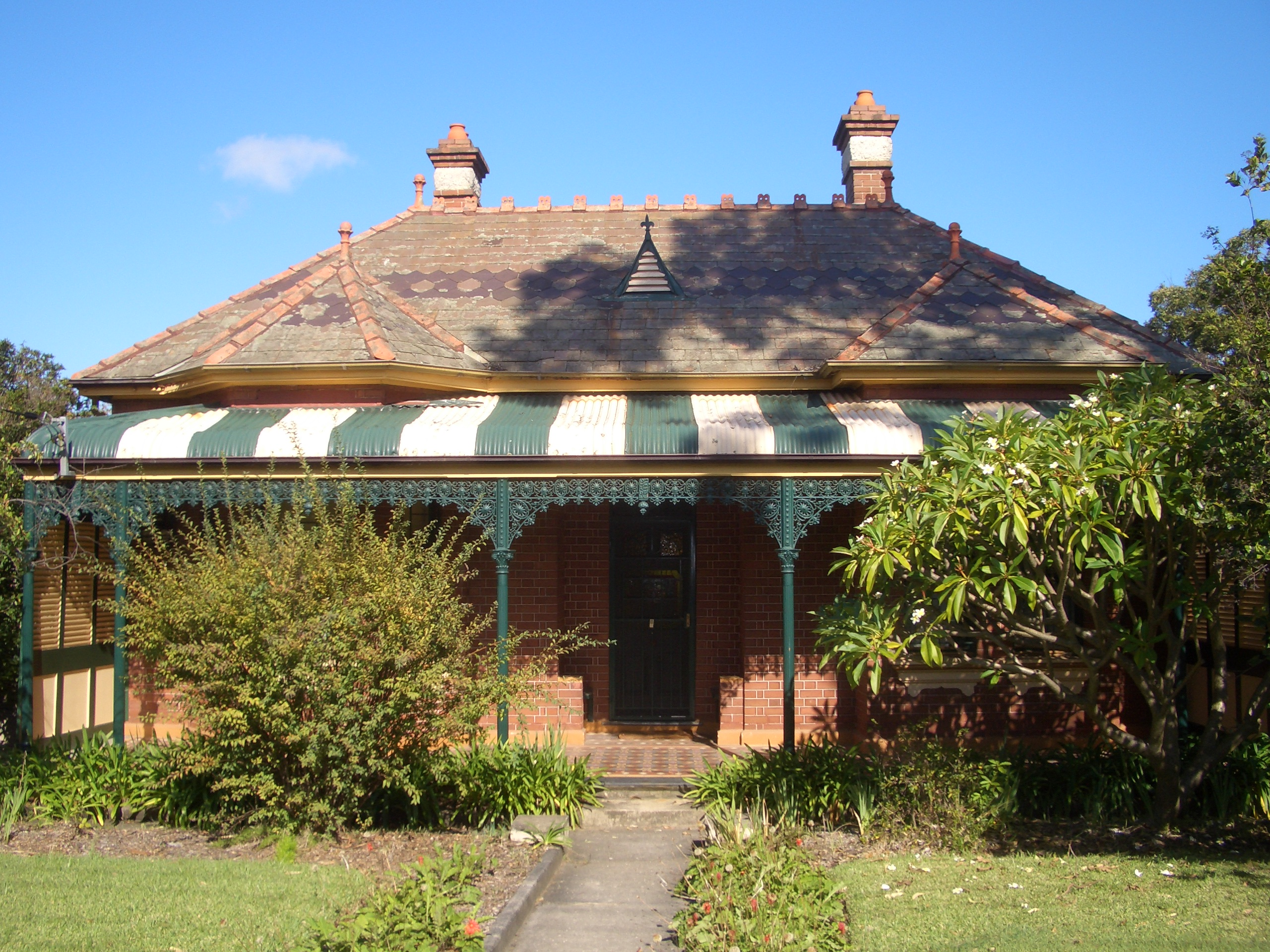
Single-storey Federation cottage with wrought-iron detailing, Gladstone Street

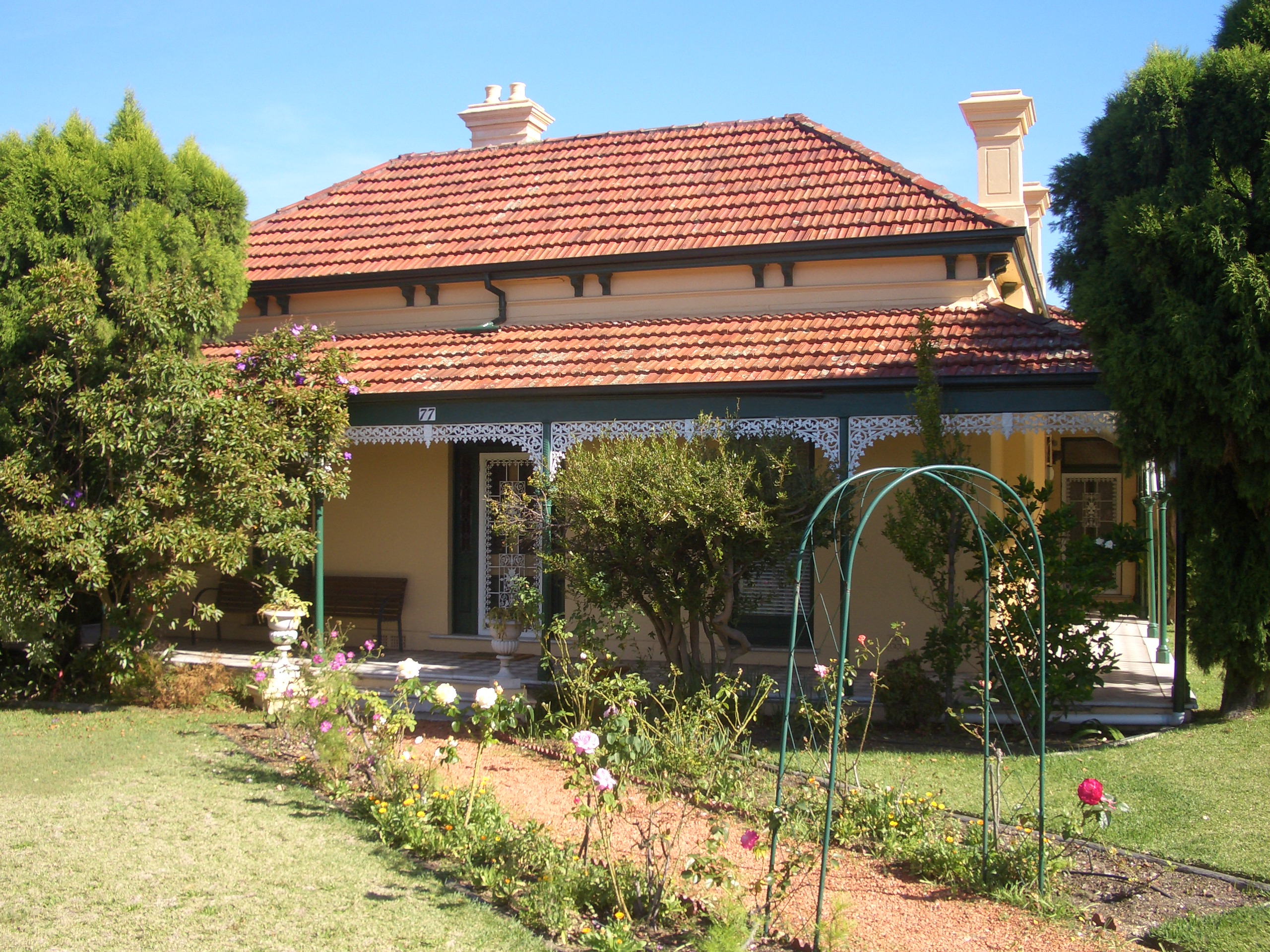
Cottage with wrap-around verandahs and wrought-iron detailing, Harrow Road

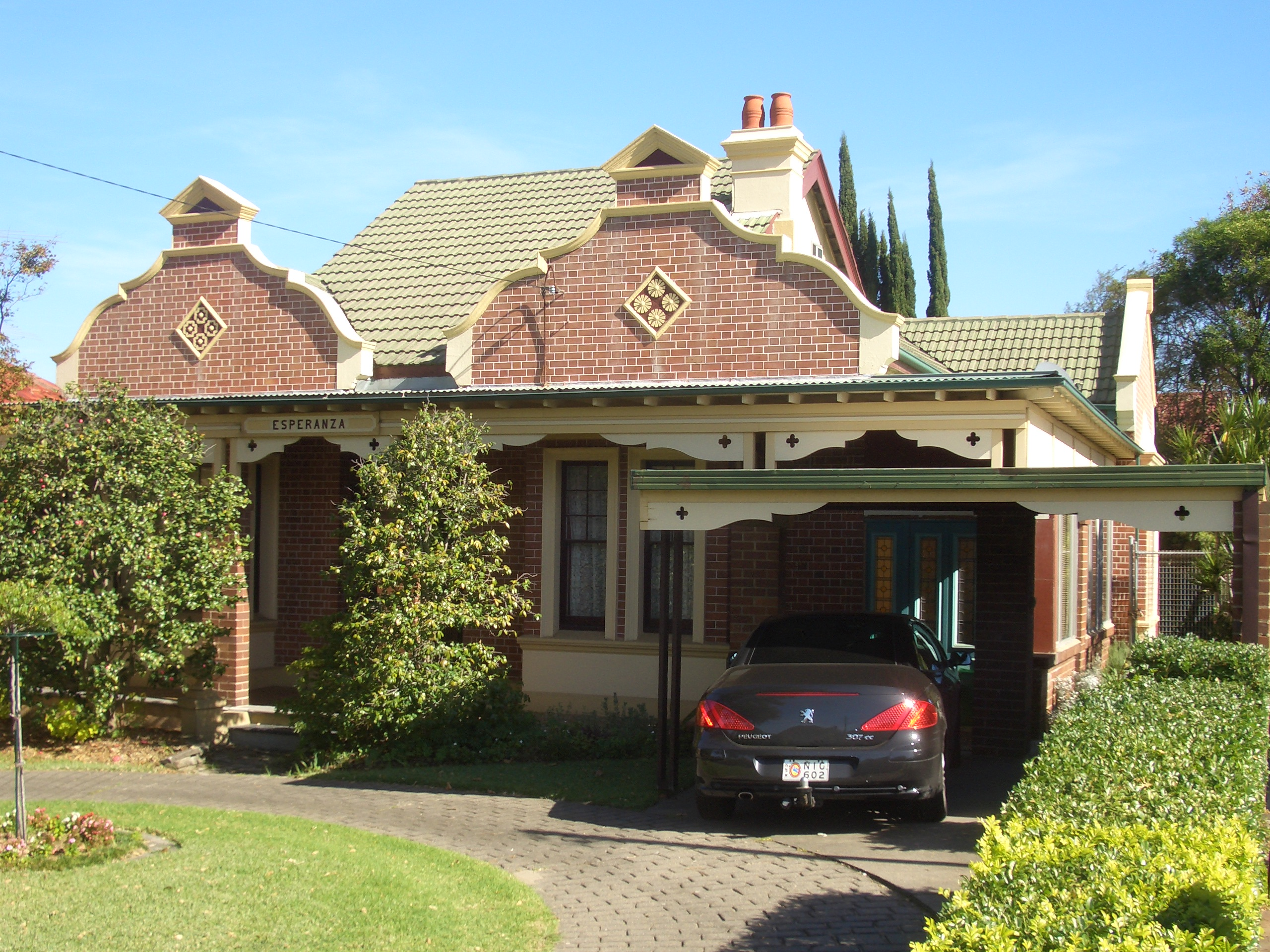
Esperanza, Harrow Road
