= Arncliffe railway station =

Railway station in Sydney, New South Wales, Australia

Arncliffe
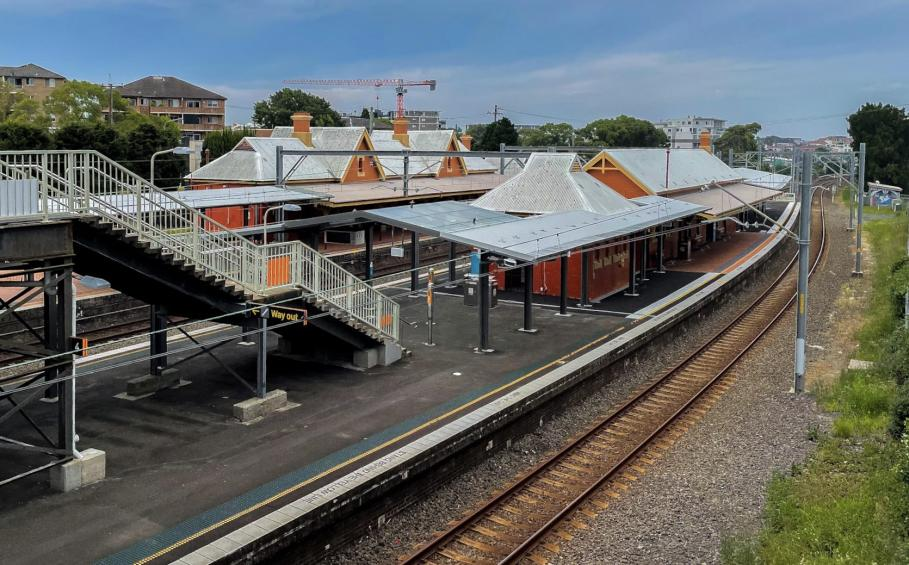
- Northbound view of Platform 1 in January 2022

General information
- Location: Firth Street, Arncliffe; Sydney, New South Wales; Australia
- Coordinates: 33°56′11″S 151°08′51″E
- Owner: Transport Asset Manager of NSW
- Operator: Sydney Trains
- Line: South Coast
- Distance: 8.42 km (5.23 mi) from Central
- Platforms: 4 (2 island)
- Tracks: 4
- Connections: Bus

Construction
- Structure type: Ground
- Accessible: Yes

Other information
- Status: Weekdays: Staffed: 6am to 7pm: Weekends and public holidays: Staffed: 8am to 4pm
- Station code: ACL
- Website: Transport for NSW

History
- Opened: 15 October 1884 (141 years ago)
- Electrified: Yes (from 1926)
- Former names: Illawarra Road (during construction)

Passengers
- 2025: 1,256,252 (year); 3,442 (daily) (Sydney Trains)
- Rank: 111

Services
Preceding station	Sydney Trains	Following station
Banksia towards Waterfall or Cronulla	Eastern Suburbs & Illawarra Line	Wolli Creek towards Bondi Junction
Location

Arncliffe railway station is a heritage-listed suburban railway station located on the South Coast line, serving the Sydney suburb of Arncliffe. It is served by Sydney Trains T4 Eastern Suburbs & Illawarra Line services. It was added to the New South Wales State Heritage Register on 2 April 1999.

== History ==
Arncliffe station opened on 15 October 1884 on the same date as the South Coast line from Redfern to Hurstville with two side platforms. Arncliffe Station was designed as the first major station on the Illawarra Line southwards from Sydney and was one of the most substantial stations of the eight built in 1884, reflecting the importance of the locality.

The station was originally known as Illawarra Road during construction, though this had changed to Arncliffe by opening. It was built by Alfred McNeill and William Clark and designed by the office of the New South Wales Government Railways. Like Sydenham railway station completed in the same year, Arncliffe was constructed with two wayside platforms: the eastern platform contained a 3rd class brick station building, while the western platform contained an impressive 2nd class brick station building having a street frontage.

In 1906, the northbound platform was converted to an island with a new northbound track. The former northbound track (current Platform 2) became the southbound track, with the former southbound platform (current Platform 3) disused until converted to an island platform in 1923 as part of the quadruplication of the South Coast line from Wolli Creek to Rockdale. A footbridge and small overhead booking office were also constructed as part of the works.

In 1909, the Arncliffe-Bexley steam tram began operation, and a tramway siding was added. The Station was originally a wayside station with a matching platform but was converted to its present configuration with the addition of new tracks. In 1923 the line was quadruplicated, and as part of the works an arched brick overbridge was built over Forest Road, which is now the largest single span arched overbridge of the entire railway system.

In preparation for quadruplication, the original footbridge and overhead booking office were demolished and replaced by a new footbridge in 1919. With construction of the new footbridge, the southern wing of the Platform 1/2 building was demolished. In 1923, the existing Platform 3/4 building was converted to an island platform. As such, the Platform 3/4 building underwent major alterations including new platform awnings constructed on both sides; floor levels raised; and new door and window openings and joinery. A 60-metre tunnel length existed to the south of the station, but was opened out and a bridge to carry Forest Road built in 1923. A new larger timber overhead booking office was constructed in 1925, and the line through the station to Hurstville was electrified in 1926. The Arncliffe-Bexley tram line closed in 1926.

A 1943 Lands Department aerial photo of the station shows the station in its current configuration, including shrub plantings on the platforms.

In April 2015, work to install four new lifts at Arncliffe station commenced. This was completed in September 2016. In May 2015, work commenced on the construction of a pedestrian tunnel below the South Coast line 300 metres north of the station. It opened in October 2016.

== Services ==
=== Platforms ===
Platform	Line	Stopping pattern	Notes
1	T4	services to Bondi Junction	Peak platform
2	T4	services to Hurstville	Peak platform
3	T4	services to Bondi Junction	Off-peak platform
4	T4	services to Cronulla, Waterfall & Helensburgh	Off-peak platform

=== Transport links ===
Transit Systems operates one bus route via Arncliffe station, under contract to Transport for NSW:

- 473: Rockdale station to Campsie

== Description ==
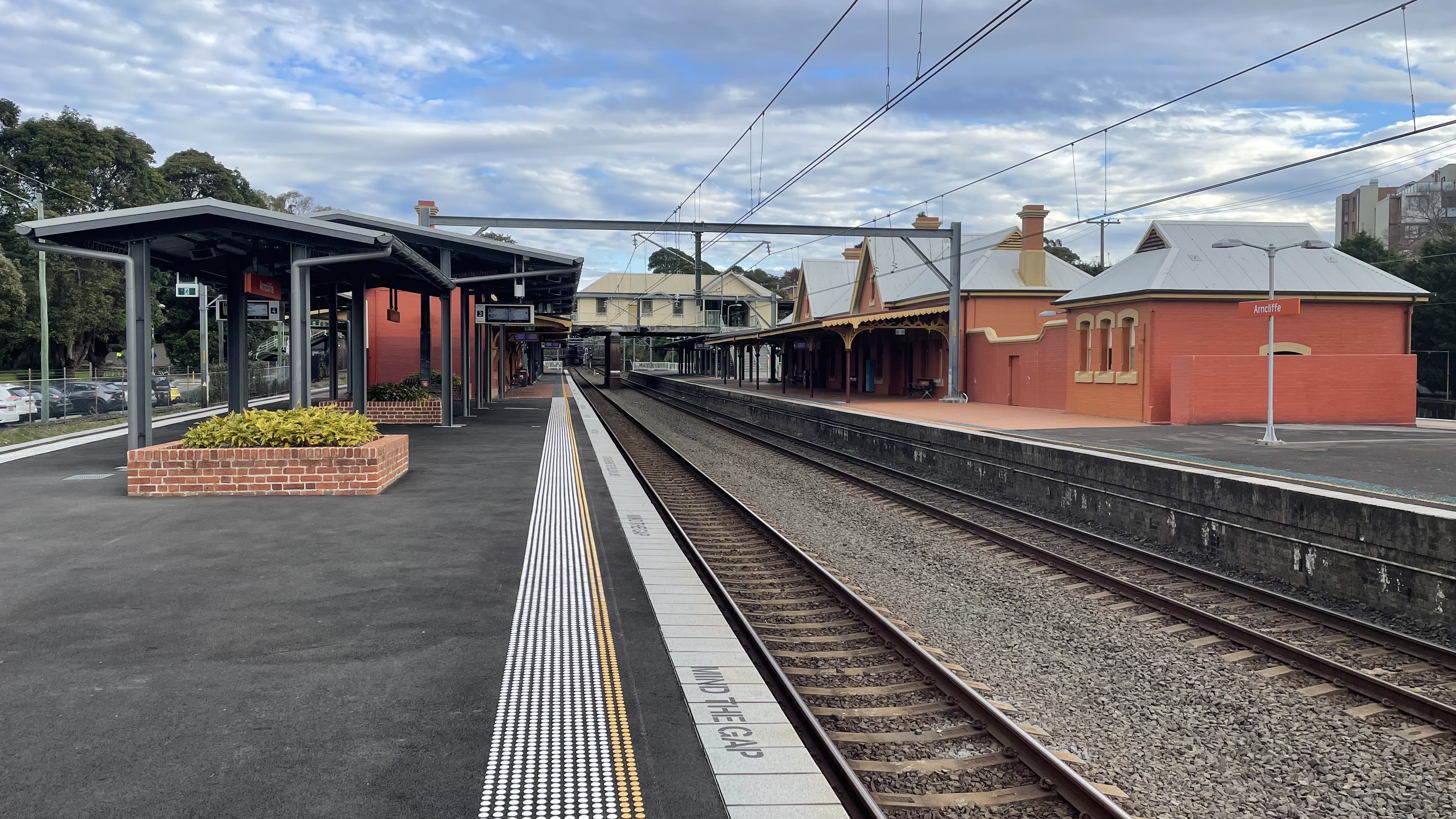
Southbound view from platform 3

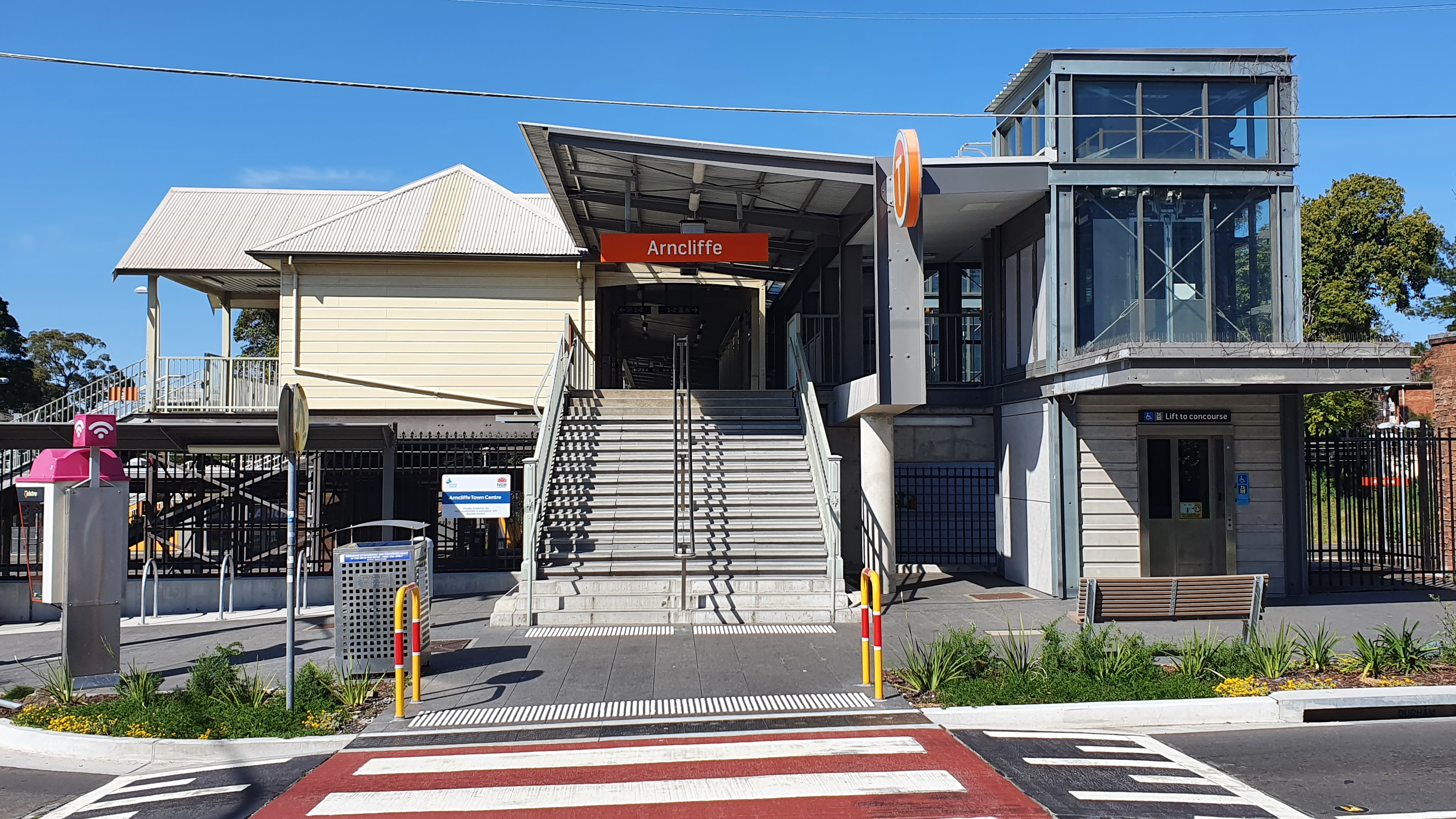
Western Entrance

The heritage-listed railway complex includes the platform 1/2 building (1884), the platform 3/4 building (1885, 1923), the footbridge and stairs (1919), the overhead booking office (1925), the platforms (1884, 1923) and the platform plantings (current and prior to 1943).

Arncliffe Railway Station is accessed via a footbridge and stairs, entered from Firth St on the west and via a footpath across a public park from Butterworth Lane on the east side.

Platform 1/2 Building (1884)

The Platform 1/2 building is similar in form to the Tempe Station buildings, with two gable ends facing the rail lines at each end and on each side of the building. The main (southern) section of the building has a hipped roof with transverse gables clad in corrugated steel roofing with timber louvred gablet vents to the roof. There are two painted brick chimneys. The main gable ends have timber louvred vents with stucco sills and heads. The building has painted brick walls with stucco sills and heads to arched windows. Windows are timber framed double hung. Some doorways retain timber framed fanlights, slightly arched. The main entrance to the building (formerly road entrance) is marked by a gable end projecting in the centre bay. This centre bay is shaped to form a gothic arch. There is one original timber 4 panel door on the west (Platform 1)>side of the building, complete with fanlights and sidelights. On the east (Platform 2) side the building has timber panelled double doors: three pairs with timber framed fanlights with vertical glazing bars.

The northern end pavilion (former toilets) is attached to the main part of the building via a brick walled courtyard. The painted brick courtyard walls have a projecting stucco moulding at the top. On the western side, there is a covered over doorway into the courtyard. The small square painted brick former toilet pavilion has brick stop chamfered corners and a hipped corrugated steel roof. There are 3 small timber-framed windows to east and west elevations, and a brick screen to the doorway at the northern end.

The west (Platform 1) awning is supported on groups of 2 or 3 cast iron columns with very elaborate decorative cast iron capitals, brackets and frieze to the underside of the awning beam. There is a central gable to the awning facing the rail lines which also features decorative timber brackets to the gable end. The awning is set back from the platform edge.

The east (Platform 2) awning has single cast iron columns with 4 radiating decorative cast iron brackets, with similar cast iron brackets attached to the building facade and unusual iron ties and decorative metal valance, mounted on elaborate stucco wall brackets. This was the original platform face of the building. There are steel security doors.

The waiting room has a chimney breast and modern floor tiles, plaster timber-battened ceiling with a plaster ceiling rose and plaster moulded cornices.

Platform 3/4 Building (1884, 1923)

Similar to platform buildings at Sydenham Railway Station, the Platform 3/4 building is a single storey painted brick building. There are separate painted brick toilets with three small timber framed double hung windows each side, entered from the north end and with a brick screen to the entry doorway. The toilets are connected to the main platform building by a linking structure with a gabled corrugated steel roof and walls of corrugated steel with timber louvres.

The main (northern) section of the platform building is painted brick with a corrugated steel gabled roof, with one chimney to the north end. Windows are timber framed double hung with slightly arched heads. There are arched openings, and stucco sills and mouldings to window heads and around fanlights. The awning to Platform 4 is cantilevered on steel brackets mounted on stucco wall brackets.

Internally, the first room at the southern end of the main section of the building has a ripple iron ceiling with a metal ceiling rose. The main waiting area, to the north of the 1st room, also has a ripple iron ceiling with a metal ceiling rose. There are slate door thresholds and modern tiled floors. The toilets at the southern end have timber tongue & grooved partitions. There is one timber 4-panelled entry door to the toilets with two glazed upper panels. The ripple iron ceiling with metal ceiling rose to the first room and main waiting area.

Footbridge and Stairs (1919)

Dorman Long & Co. steel footbridge and stairs with original star pattern newel posts and railings except stairs to Platforms 3/4, which has modern railings and posts to entry steps. There are timber posts to the Platform 1/2 entry from the pedestrian overbridge.

The footbridge has a concrete floor and steps. The footbridge consists of two steel beam structures over the Illawarra line, one for street access the other for platform interchange. There is a metal screen to the north side of the footbridge.

Overhead Booking Office (1925)

The overhead booking office was formerly a weatherboard building, which has been reclad with panels of fibre-cement sheeting. The booking office has a hipped and gabled corrugated steel roof, and original timber framed double hung windows with 9-paned top sashes with multicoloured glazing. The top sashes of the windows are slightly arched at the top of the glazing.

Platforms (1884, 1923)

Two island platforms, asphalt surfaces with some areas of modern brick paving on Platform 1/2. Platform faces are brick. Platform 1/2 has a distinctive curve on its western side. Platform 3/4 is slightly curved on its eastern side. Both platforms are entered from the footbridge and stairs located towards the southern ends of the platforms. There is an extension to the southern end of Platform 1/2.

Landscape/Natural Features

Topiary shrub plantings on both island platforms.

Moveable items

Cast iron late Victorian period bubbler, located near the Platform 1/2 building.

Condition

The entire station complex was reported as being in good condition as at 25 June 2009.

The platform buildings are remarkably intact. The footbridge and stairs are intact. The 1925 overhead booking office, while externally reclad, retains its original form and many features such as original windows.

== Heritage listing ==
Arncliffe Railway Station is of State historical significance as an important station on the Illawarra Line demonstrating its development from 1884 to 1925, including the adaptation of two wayside buildings for island use. The Arncliffe Railway Station is of historical significance as one of three remaining stations with 1880s "second class" brick platform buildings on the Illawarra line, and is one of the best examples of suburban station architecture from the first period of construction on the Illawarra line. The platform buildings are of aesthetic significance, the Platform 1/2 building being an elaborate Victorian Italianate style building with decorative cast iron columns and brackets to awnings, and elaborate detail, the Platform 3/4 building being an 1884 wayside platform building altered in 1923 to an island platform building. The Arncliffe Railway Station 1919 steel footbridge and stairs, the 1923 overhead booking office, and the concrete and brick road overbridge are considered to be good representative examples of their types.

Arncliffe railway station was listed on the New South Wales State Heritage Register on 2 April 1999 having satisfied the following criteria.

The place is important in demonstrating the course, or pattern, of cultural or natural history in New South Wales.

Arncliffe Railway Station is of State historical significance as an important station on the Illawarra Line, demonstrating its development from 1884 to 1925, during important phases of railway construction and development. The development of the station has included the adaptation of two wayside buildings for island use.

The place is important in demonstrating aesthetic characteristics and/or a high degree of creative or technical achievement in New South Wales.

The platform buildings are of aesthetic significance, the Platform 1/2 building being an elaborate Victorian Italianate style building with decorative cast iron columns and brackets to awnings, and elaborate detail, the Platform 3/4 building being an altered 1884 wayside platform building altered to an island platform building in 1923, with major alterations including new platform awnings, and alterations to windows, doors and joinery.

The place has strong or special association with a particular community or cultural group in New South Wales for social, cultural or spiritual reasons.

The place has the potential to contribute to the local community's sense of place, and can provide a connection to the local community's past.

The place possesses uncommon, rare or endangered aspects of the cultural or natural history of New South Wales.

Arncliffe Railway Station is considered rare for its remarkably externally intact 2nd class Platform 1/2 building dating from 1884, as only three stations on the Illawarra line retain platform buildings of this type and period (other examples at Sydenham station and Tempe station).

The place is important in demonstrating the principal characteristics of a class of cultural or natural places/environments in New South Wales.

The Arncliffe Railway Station 1919 steel footbridge and stairs, and the 1923 overhead booking office are considered to be good representative examples of their types.
