= Como railway bridge =

Bridge in New South Wales, Australia

- Coordinates: 33.9952°S 151.0703°E
- Carries: Illawarra railway line
- Crosses: Georges River
- Locale: Como

Characteristics
- Design: Lattice truss bridge
- Total length: 954 feet (291 m)
- Longest span: 158 feet (48 m)
- No. of spans: 6
- Piers in water: 5
- Clearance below: 35 feet (11 m)

History
- Architect: John Whitton
- Opened: 25 December 1885
- Closed: 26 November 1972

Statistics
- Daily traffic: rail

Location
- Interactive map of Como railway bridge

Como railway bridge
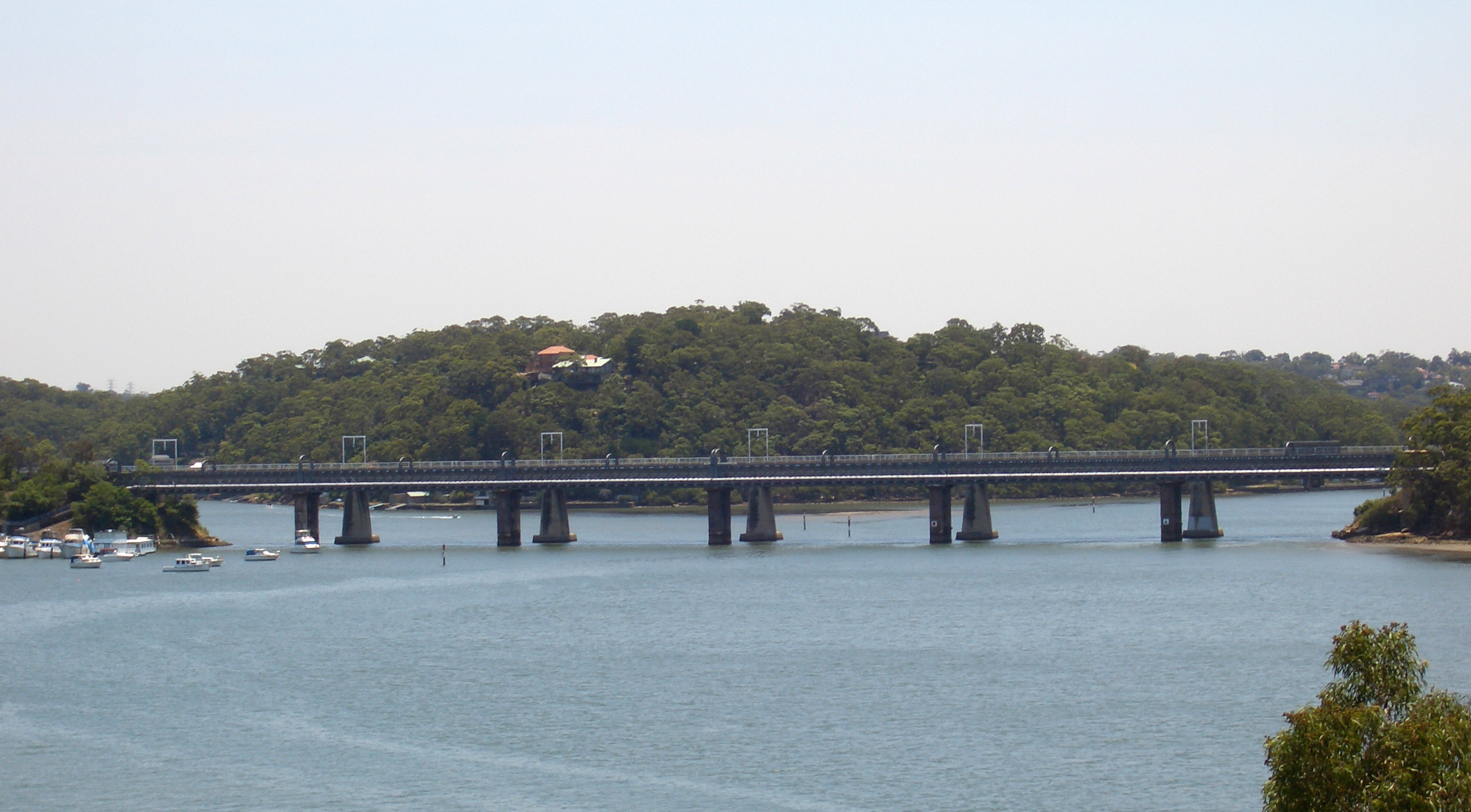
- Original bridge in the foreground in December 2006
- Coordinates: 33.9952°S 151.0706°E
- Carries: Illawarra railway line
- Crosses: Georges River
- Locale: Como
- Preceded by: Como Railway Bridge

History
- Opening: 27 November 1972
- Replaces: original single track bridge

Location
- Interactive map of Como railway bridge

The Como railway bridge carries the Illawarra railway line across the Georges River between the Sydney suburbs of Oatley and Como.

== First bridge ==
The original Como Railway Bridge opened on 25 December 1885, as part of the extension of the Illawarra railway line from Hurstville to Sutherland. It was a single track lattice truss bridge designed by John Whitton, the Chief Engineer of the New South Wales Government Railways. In 1890 the northern part of the Illawarra Line was duplicated, and the southern part towards Sutherland in 1891. This involved merging the two lines using points to a single line. In 1894 the tracks across the bridge were altered into a single gauntlet track on the bridge, which enabled trains to cross in either direction without points.

Between 1935 and 1942, the Metropolitan Water Sewerage & Drainage Board built two 24 in (61 cm) diameter pipelines to pump water from the recently completed Woronora Dam to the reservoir at Penshurst. The pipeline was supported on new steel outriggers cantilevered from the main girders. After the construction of the second bridge the ownership of the old bridge was transferred from the Railways Dept to Sydney Water. This bridge was listed on the New South Wales State Heritage Register on 15 November 2002.

== Second bridge ==
To relieve the bottleneck, in 1969, the New South Wales Government commissioned John Holland & Co to build a new double track reinforced concrete bridge immediately to the west. It opened on 27 November 1972. The original bridge reopened as a cycleway on 15 December 1985. This bridge has been the subject of a State Rail Authority Heritage study, however is not listed on the NSW State Heritage Register.

On 28 January 1985, the rear car of a commuter train derailed on that bridge.

== See also ==
- List of railway bridges in New South Wales
