= Illawarra Junction =

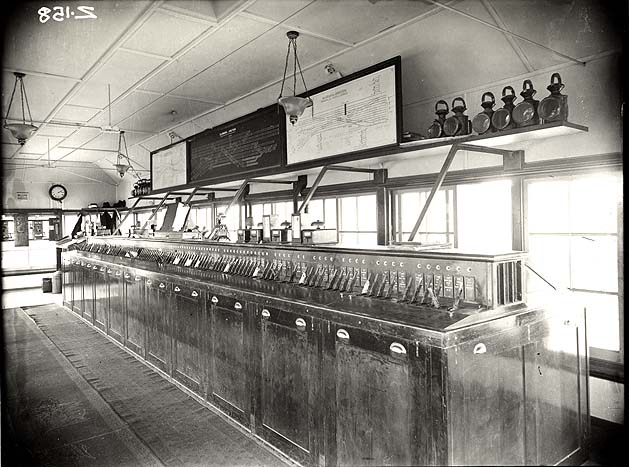
- The interior of the closed Illawarra Junction Signal Box, located south of Sydney Central

Overview
- Status: Operating
- Owner: Transport Asset Manager of New South Wales
- Locale: Eveleigh Railway Workshops, Sydney, New South Wales, Australia
- Coordinates: 33°53′43″S 151°11′26″E
- Connecting lines: Illawarra railway line; Main Suburban railway line

Service
- Type: Commuter rail
- System: Sydney Trains
- Operator(s): Sydney Trains

History
- Opened: 15 October 1884
- Automated signals: 1913
- Relocation of signal box: 1916
- Closure of signal box: 1979

Technical
- Number of tracks: 10
- Track gauge: 1,435 mm (4 ft 8 1/2 in) standard gauge
- Electrification: c. 1925

The Illawarra Junction is a major railway junction located near the Eveleigh Railway Workshops, in Eveleigh, in the inner western suburbs of Sydney, New South Wales, Australia. This complex junction joins a number of different lines and yards. There are two pairs of tracks (named Illawarra Main and Illawarra Local) from the Illawarra railway line from the south and three pairs of tracks (named Local, Suburban and Main) from the Main Suburban railway line from the west.

It is likely that the junction opened on 15 October 1884, when the line to Hurstville was opened. The line was duplicated in 1895, and quadruplicated in 1912, through St Peters and Erskineville stations. The quadruplication involved the relocation of the junction and the construction of a new signal box positioned above the tracks towards Macdonaldtown station, that was opened in 1916. In 1927, the junction was expanded to accommodate the current ten-track configuration. The signal box was closed in 1979, was replaced by the Sydney signal box, and the former signal box subsequently removed.

== Arrangement ==
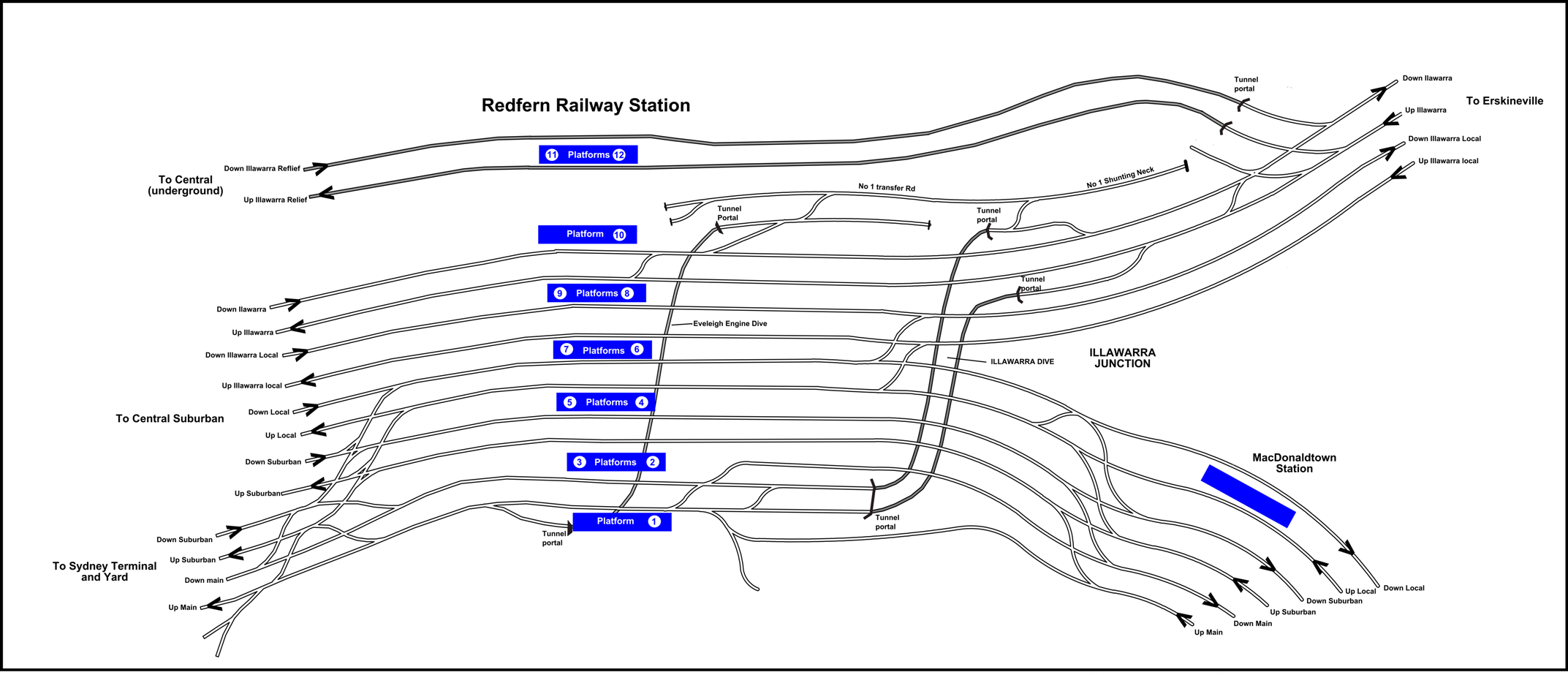
An inverse view (looking south) showing the junction to the west of Redfern railway station (with 12 platforms). The darker shaded lines are the Illawarra Dive tunnels under the Main Suburban railway line to connect with the Illawarra railway line. The Illawarra line terminates top right; and the Main Suburban line terminates bottom right. All lines on left lead to Sydney Terminal.

=== Illawarra Line ===
The first set of junctions is in the south-west corner, just north of Erskineville station, where trains coming from the Illawarra line can dive into the Eastern Suburbs line. Further north is the Illawarra Dive, where trains from the Illawarra line can crossover to the Main without obstructing any of the other tracks. This dive is mostly used by South Coast Line trains terminating at Sydney Terminal, services on the Southern Highlands Line and NSW TrainLink Southern regional services. East of Redfern station there are no further crossovers with the lines continuing toward the flying junctions at Central. On either side of the Illawarra Main, there are connections (with no track) to the disused platforms 13–14 at Redfern.

=== Main Suburban Line ===
In the north-west corner, just north of Macdonaldtown station, there are a number of crossovers allowing trains to switch between the Local, Suburban and Main lines. These crossovers are seldom used. Just past the end of the entry/exit track for Macdonaldtown Carriage Sheds are two crossovers between the Local and Illawarra Local tracks, allowing trains from the Illawarra Local to access Sydney Terminal. There is also a tunnel from the Eveleigh Railway Workshops connecting to the Up Main just beyond Redfern station. East of Redfern station is where the Main Suburban line ends. There are a complex set of flat junctions allowing trains on all three pairs of tracks to enter Sydney Terminal. The local and suburban tracks also continue on the City Circle and North Shore line respectively.

=== Eveleigh Maintenance Centre ===
Eveleigh Maintenance Centre lies to the south of all the surface tracks and on top of the Eastern Suburbs line tunnels. There are several crossovers providing access to the yard. There is a crossover in the south-west corner, allowing trains from the Up & Down Illawarra Main to access the yard. Another crossover allows trains to access the Down Illawarra Dive, which is actually bi-directional, due to the crossover at the other end onto the Up Illawarra Dive. Trains from Sydney Yard can enter/exit through the Engine Dive, which passes from the Down Main, under Redfern station, to the yard. Trains to/from the City Circle can enter through the Arrival/Departure Road, which joins the Up/Down Illawarra Main.

=== Macdonaldtown Carriage Sheds ===
The Macdonaldtown Carriage Sheds lie between the Main Suburban and Illawarra lines. It has a single entry/exit road. Crossovers allow trains to enter the yard from the Up/Down Local lines and allow trains to exit the yard onto the Up Local or Up Illawarra Local lines.

== Incidents ==
At various stages, especially during the early years of the 20th century, incidents occurred at the Illawarra Junction including the death of fettlers and other railway workers, and derailments.
