= Sydenham railway station, Sydney =

Railway station in Sydney, New South Wales, Australia

Sydenham
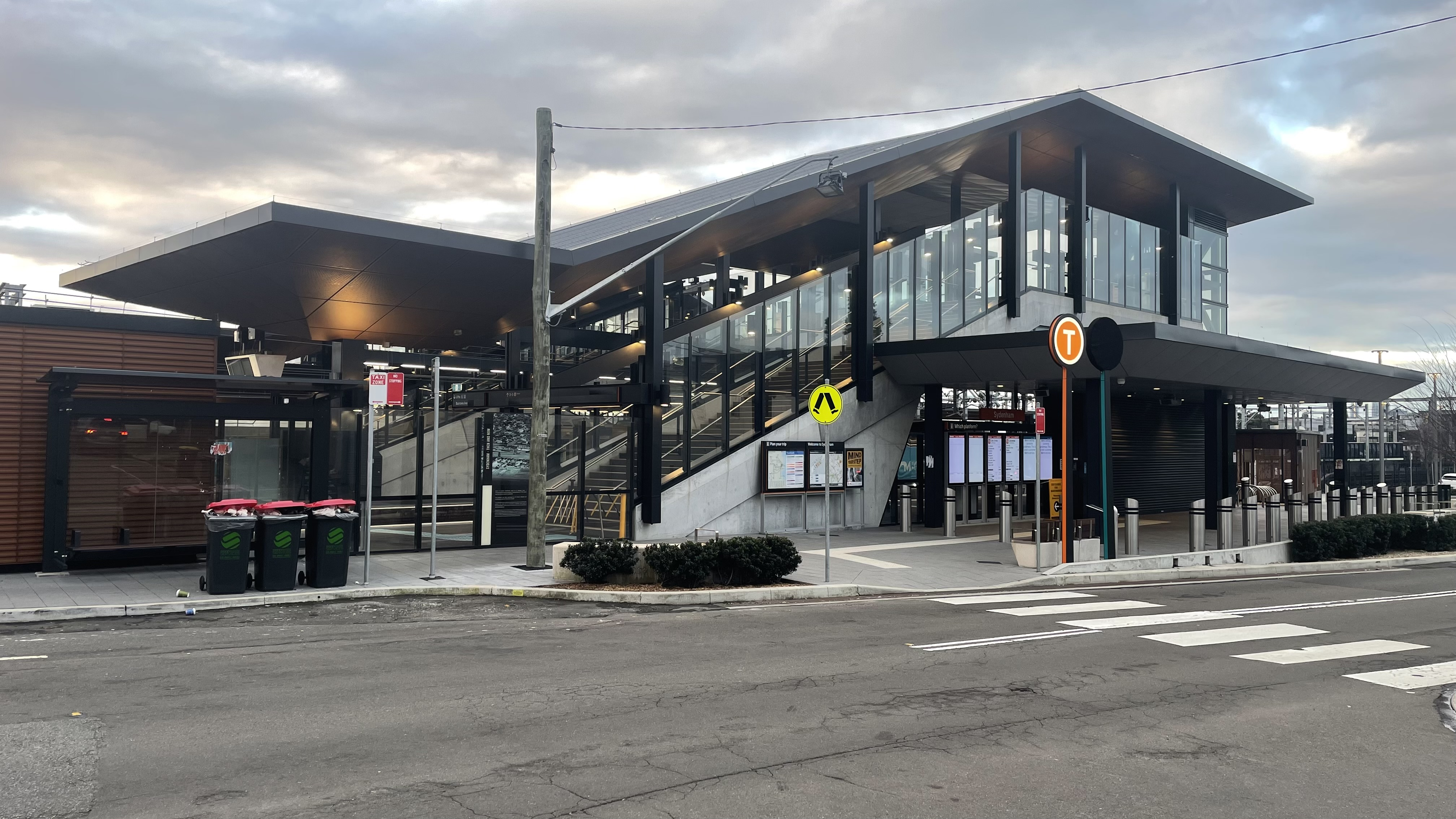
- Burrows Avenue station entrance and concourse in July 2024

General information
- Location: Gleeson Avenue, Sydenham; Sydney, New South Wales; Australia
- Coordinates: 33°54′52″S 151°10′00″E
- Elevation: 9 metres (30 ft)
- Owner: Transport Asset Manager of NSW
- Operator: Sydney Trains
- Lines: South Coast; Metro North West & Bankstown
- Distance: 5.31 km (3.30 mi) from Central
- Platforms: 6 (2 island, 2 side)
- Tracks: 6
- Connections: Bus

Construction
- Structure type: Ground
- Accessible: Yes

Other information
- Status: Staffed
- Station code: SDN
- Website: Transport for NSW

History
- Opened: 15 October 1884 (142 years ago)
- Former names: Marrickville (1884–1895)

Passengers
- 2025: 11,503,806 (year); 31,517 (daily) (Sydney Trains, Sydney Metro)
- Rank: 13

Services
Preceding station	Sydney Trains	Following station
Tempe towards Waterfall or Cronulla	T4 Eastern Suburbs & Illawarra Line	Redfern towards Bondi Junction
Wolli Creek towards Waterfall or Cronulla	T4 Eastern Suburbs & Illawarra Line	Redfern towards Bondi Junction
Terminus	T8 Airport & South Line	St Peters towards City Circle
Revesby towards Campbelltown	T8 Airport & South Line (limited weekday peak services)	St Peters towards City Circle
Preceding station	Intercity Trains	Following station
Wolli Creek towards Kiama	South Coast Line (limited weekday services)	Redfern towards Bondi Junction
Preceding station	Sydney Metro	Following station
Marrickville towards Bankstown	M1 Metro North West & Bankstown Line	Waterloo towards Tallawong
Location

Sydenham railway station is a heritage-listed rapid transit and suburban railway station located at the junction of the South Coast, Bankstown and Metro North West & Bankstown lines, serving the Sydney suburb of Sydenham. It is served by Sydney Trains T4 Eastern Suburbs & Illawarra Line and T8 Airport & South Line services, intercity South Coast Line services, as well as Sydney Metro North West & Bankstown Line services.

It was designed by New South Wales Government Railways and opened in 1884, with William Robinson having built the original station buildings. It was added to the New South Wales State Heritage Register on 2 April 1999.

== History ==
Sydenham was built on a duplicated line from Illawarra Junction to Hurstville and opened as Marrickville on 15 October 1884. The western platform contained a major 3rd class brick station building having a detached toilet block at each end separated by walled courtyards while the eastern platform contained a large 2nd class brick station building. The station was renamed Sydenham on 19 January 1895 with the opening of the Belmore branch line. The opening of this line also meant that Sydenham became a junction station with the current platforms 3 and 4 opened.

The impressive station was obviously intended to serve the Marrickville township proper but it was distant, surrounded by industrial and rural estates and only grew as a station by reason of the need to cope with the branch line junction. In 1907, the line from Edgeware Road to Sydenham was quadruplicated to serve the Belmore to Bankstown extension when it opened in 1909. This resulted in confining both buildings on island platforms so that passengers had to reach the platforms by an extended footbridge, whereas the substantial platform building on the current platform 2/3 island previously faced the street. A new timber overhead booking office on a steel support frame was built between platforms 3 and 4 and steel footbridges were eventually extended to all platforms c. 1914.

=== 1925: Addition of platforms for Eastern Suburbs railway line ===
To provide for the proposed Eastern Suburbs railway line, two additional tracks were put in so that in 1925 the brick standard island platform building on Platform 6 was built. In 1926, the lines were electrified at Sydenham. Soon after in 1927, the refreshment room was opened for factory workers in the area. As the additional tracks were never utilised for the Eastern Suburbs Railway, they have been mainly used for the Bankstown line trains. In 1963, a brick parcels office building was constructed on Platform 1 but closed in the late 1980s.

It had been intended that the tracks on platforms 1 and 2 would extend along the alignment to Erskineville as an adjunct to the Eastern Suburbs railway. This plan was never completed, although partial platforms were erected at St Peters and Erskineville in preparation. Because of this, Bankstown line trains continued to run on the same tracks as East Hills services, and the result of the additional platforms was that the Bankstown line's junction with the Illawarra line was moved merely from the south of Sydenham station to the north.

=== Mid-1980s: Ticket office fire and reconstruction ===
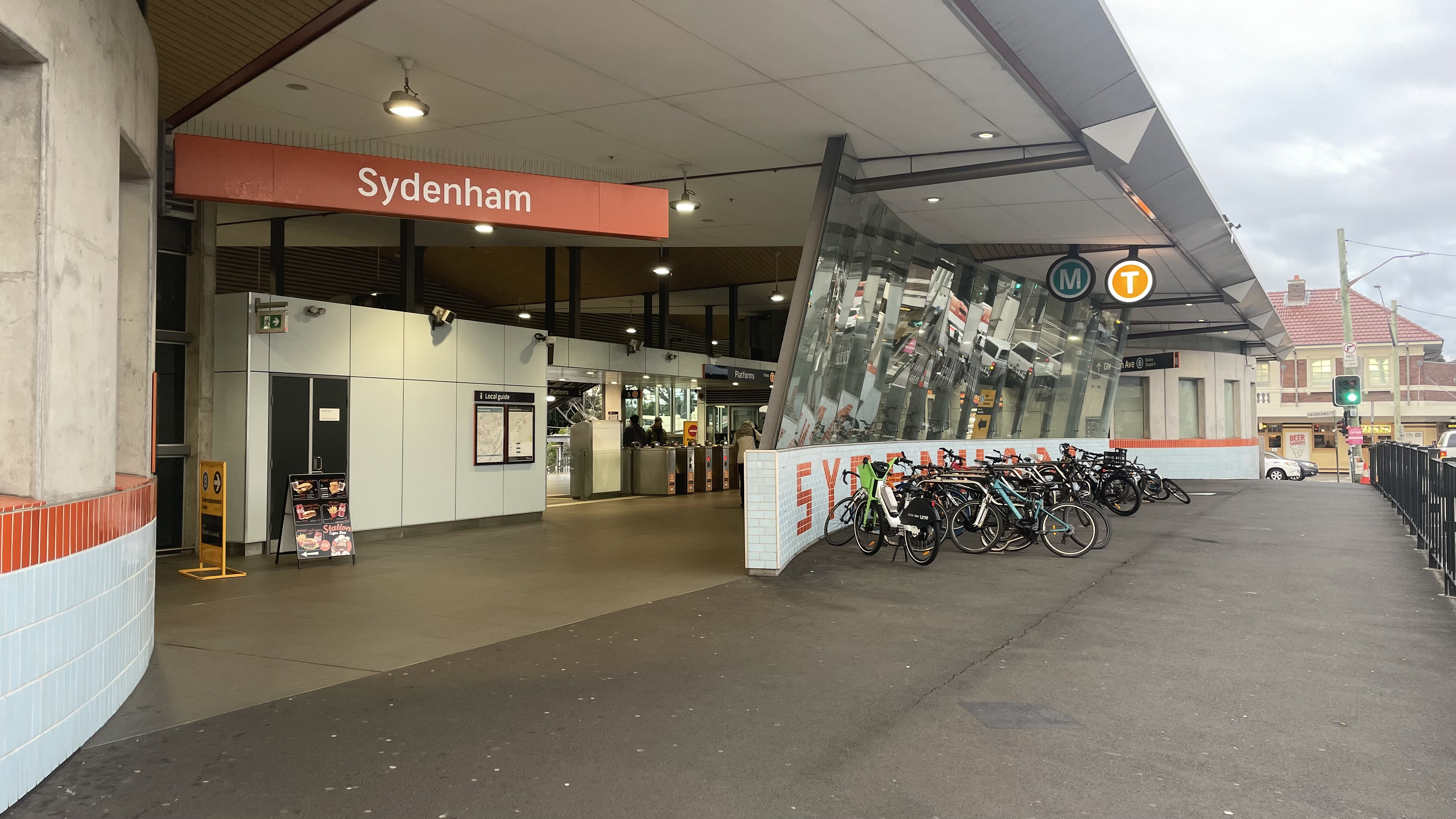
Gleeson Avenue entrance

The weatherboard ticket office on the overhead footbridge burnt down in the mid-1980s. In the late 1980s a new brick overhead booking office and a new metal-clad shop were built on the existing c. 1914 footbridge structure, and new canopies built over the stairs and connected to platform buildings.

Sydenham station now has side platforms at both the eastern and western extremities of the station (platforms 1 and 6 respectively) and two island platforms for the four inner tracks. Platforms 1 and 2 served the Bankstown Line until 2019 when the platforms were closed while construction was carried out to build the Metro North West & Bankstown Line. The platforms were re-opened in 2024 following the completion of the metro line from Chatswood railway station to Sydenham with Sydney Metro services now using these platforms to terminate and return to the city and Tallawong. Platforms 5 and 6 serve the Eastern Suburbs & Illawarra Line. Prior to the opening of the Airport line in May 2000, all East Hills line services operated via platforms 3 and 4. Most East Hills trains now run via the Airport line, although some peak hour services continue to travel via Sydenham using these platforms.

=== 2013: New concourse ===
A new concourse including four lifts and new stairs to access the platforms opened in February 2013, replacing the previous concourse and footbridge. The upgrade also included new ticketing facilities, a new family accessible toilet and staff facilities.

Immediately south of the station, the Metropolitan Goods Line to Port Botany crosses via a pratt truss bridge that opened in 1925, while beyond lies the XPT Service Centre.

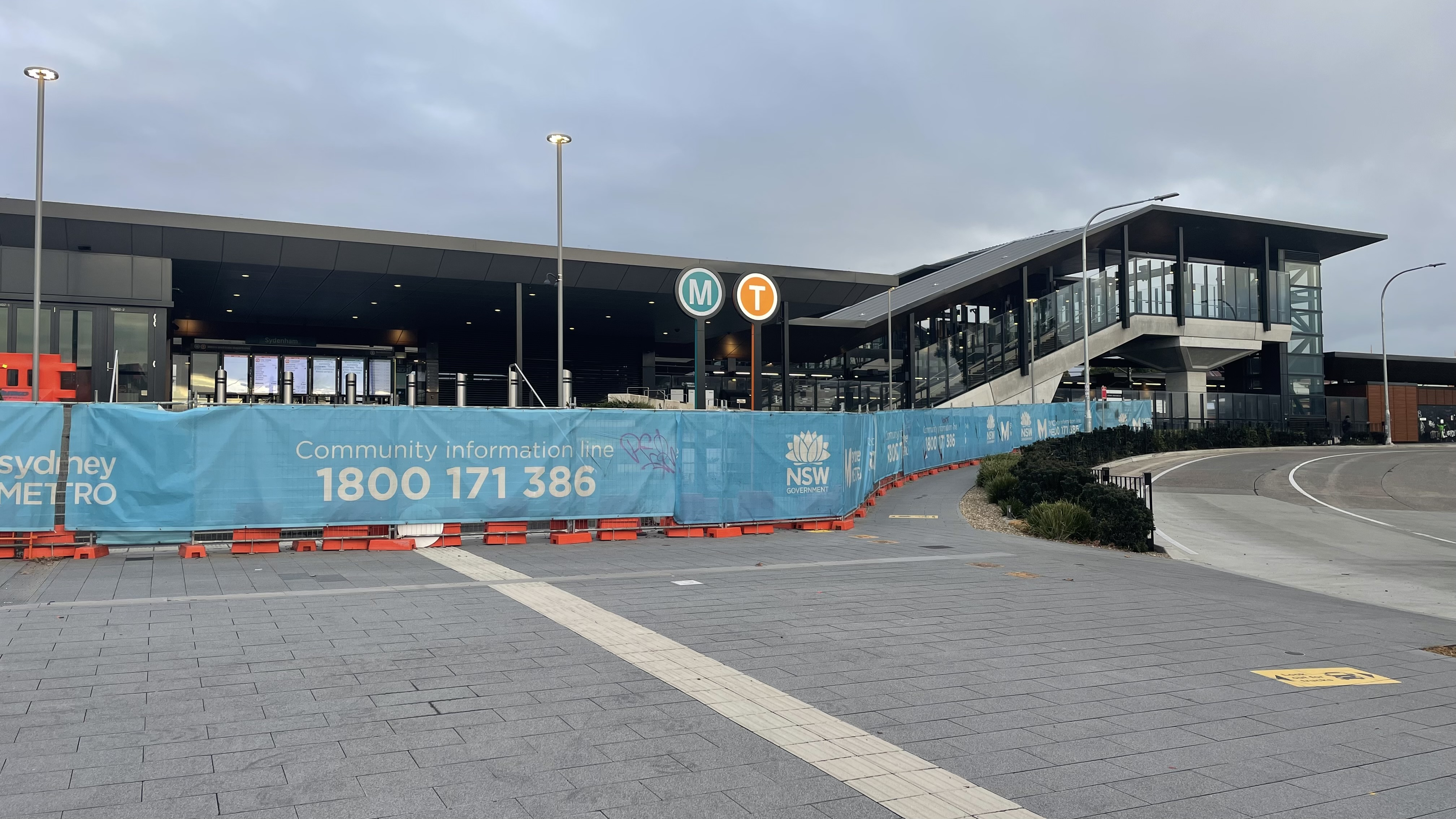
Sydenham Road entrance

=== 2024: Sydney Metro ===
As part of the Sydney Metro City & Southwest project, the station was upgraded with a new concourse on the northern end of the station, and platforms 1 and 2 upgraded and converted into use for the Sydney Metro. When conversion of the Bankstown Line from commuter rail to a rapid transit line is completed in 2026, Metro through services will run on these tracks, taking commuters from Bankstown to Tallawong and vice versa.

Metro services to Sydenham were originally planned to commence on 4 August 2024, but was postponed due to failure to secure an approval from safety regulators. Metro services to and from Tallawong commenced on 19 August 2024.

== Services ==
=== Platforms ===
Platform	Line	Stopping pattern	Notes
1	M1 Metro North West & Bankstown Line	services to Tallawong	Opened 1962, closed 2019. Reopened 2024.
2	M1 Metro North West & Bankstown Line	services to Bankstown	Opened 1907, closed 1928, reopened 1962, closed again 2019. Reopened again 2024.
3	T8 Airport & South Line	services to Central & the City Circle	Original platform
4	T8 Airport & South Line	services to Central & the City Circle; 8 weekday evening peak services to Campbelltown	Original platform
5	T4 Eastern Suburbs & Illawarra Line	services to Bondi Junction	Opened 1907
5	South Coast Line	3 weekday and 1 weekend morning services to Bondi Junction	Opened 1907
6	T4 Eastern Suburbs & Illawarra Line	services to Hurstville, Cronulla, Waterfall & Helensburgh	Opened 1928
6	South Coast Line	2 weekday services to Kiama via Banksia	Opened 1928

== Description ==
The station precinct includes the Platform 1 waiting shed (1925) and parcels office (1962), the Platform 2/3 building (1884), the Platform 4/5 Building (1884), the Platform 6 building (1925), the overhead concourse and stairs (2013), platform canopies (1986), Gleeson Avenue overbridge (c. 1920s), brick perimeter walls (1925), and platform faces (Platforms 1 and 6 dating from 1925, Platforms 2/3 and 4/5 from 1884).)

Platform 1 waiting shed (1925)

Painted brick wall to northeast side of waiting shed with a timber tongue & grooved ceiling and a modern steel structure on brick posts (structure similar to Platform 4 awning). This building is separated from and to the southeast of the brick 1962 parcels office on the platform.

Platform 1 parcels office (1962)

Located at the north-western end of the platform, this is a plain dark brick building with parapets to 3 sides and a cantilevered awning on steel brackets with a timber tongue & grooved ceiling (similar to the Platform 4 awning), on the platform side. On the north-eastern (Railway Parade) elevation, this building has a gabled parapet at its north-western end.

Platform 2/3 platform building (1884)

The Platform 2/3 building is a single storey painted brick building with a gabled roof form with gable ends at each end with rectangular timber louvred vents. At the eastern end, there is a separate men's toilet building, a small square painted brick building with a hipped corrugated steel roof and 3 timber framed double hung windows on each side. This is connected to the main platform building via a recently roofed courtyard with painted brick walls both sides and a moulded stucco capping course and central curved section. There are metal double doors to one side of the courtyard. The platform building has timber framed double hung windows, some plain, some with single horizontal glazing bars to each sash. The building has timber panelled double doors with large arched timber framed fanlights above. The south awning to the platform building has a corrugated steel skillion roof, cast iron brackets and posts with very elaborate stucco wall brackets. The north awning has a timber tongue & grooved board ceiling and is clearly more recent, with modern steel posts and framing.

The interior of the main section of the platform building is divided into rooms. The current Station Master's office (which appears to have been a former waiting area) has a decorative pressed metal ceiling and cornices, a modern tiled floor, a notable marble mantelpiece to the chimney breast. The current waiting area to this building has a timber battened plaster ceiling, a chimney breast and moulded plaster chair rail, plastered walls to 3 sides, a timber tongue & grooved board wall to the 4th side. The fanlight to the waiting area has two vertical timber glazing bars.

The building is remarkably intact, including an extant marble mantelpiece, considered very rare (only other example of an extant mantelpiece in a platform building on the Illawarra Line is at St. Peters).

Platform 4/5 platform building (1884)

A painted brick single storey building with a hipped roof form with two prominent transverse gables, timber barge boards and finials to gable ends. There are no extant chimneys and roofing is corrugated steel. The building features timber framed double hung windows with moulded stucco heads and sills. There is a lower gable roofed section at the western end of the platform building, which appears to be an extension. At the eastern end of the building is a separate former toilets building with a hipped roof and transverse gablets at the peak of the roof. This is connected to the main section of the platform building by a now roofed brick walled courtyard. The Platform 4 (north) awning is on cast iron posts with decorative cast iron brackets and framing, with a corrugated steel skillion roof. The Platform 5 (south) awning is a skillion corrugated steel roofed awning cantilevered on steel posts and brackets, which does not extend the full length of the main section of the platform building.

The waiting area to this building has a ripple iron ceiling with moulded timber cornice and one metal ceiling rose, a chimney breast, and timber floor. The former female toilets have a plaster ceiling with a damaged plaster ceiling rose. The modern toilet building is separate.

Platform 6 building (1925)

This is located at the far north-western end of the platform. This is a gabled brick platform building with a corrugated steel roof. Most windows are altered, however original windows are timber framed double hung with 9-paned top sashes. There is a 6-paned fanlight to one door. Mostly modern timber flush doors. The building includes a skillion awning cantilevered on steel brackets mounted on stucco wall brackets.

Overhead concourse (2013)

Concrete and glass structure providing entry from Gleeson Avenue.

Platform canopies (c. late 1980s)

Modern canopies extend from the overhead concourse, over the stairs, connecting to the platform buildings on all platforms. The canopy to Platform 6 is very long due to the location of the Platform 6 building. These canopies have gabled corrugated steel roofing and steel supports with curved brackets.

Gleeson Avenue overbridge (c. 1920s)

Brick bridge with brick balustrades. Balustrades are painted with advertising facing Gleeson Avenue.

Brick perimeter walls (1925)

Dark face brick walls partially defining the station perimeters, extending from Gleeson Avenue some metres along Burrows Avenue on the south and part of the station perimeter in Railway Parade on the north. The Burrows Avenue wall tapers up in height towards Gleeson Avenue. The Railway Parade wall has a flat top and part forms the wall of the 1925 waiting shed on Platform 1. Both walls have a bullnose brick capping course.

Platforms

Two side platforms; (Platforms 1 and 6) and 2 island platforms (Platforms 2/3 and 4/5). All 4 platforms have asphalt surfaces and brick faces.

Natural Features

There are shrub plantings at the eastern end of each of the platforms.

=== Modifications and dates ===
- 1907: platforms extended.
- 1912: overhead booking office.
- 1948: alterations to station buildings (minor), platform extension to Platform 6
- 1986: Concrete decking and new buildings (ticket office, shop) built late 1980s on existing footbridge structure, following fire damage to previous weatherboard overhead booking office in the mid-1980s. Canopies connecting footbridge to platform buildings built at the same time as new buildings on footbridge.
- 2013: New, larger concourse built to replace the previous concourse and footbridge.
- 2019–2024: new northern concourse built, platforms 1–2 extended and converted for metro operation

== Heritage listing ==
Sydenham Railway Station – inclusive of all platform buildings and awnings, parcels office, waiting shed, brick faced platforms, Gleeson Avenue overbridge and brick perimeter walls – is of State heritage significance. Sydenham Railway Station is of historical significance as a major junction station developed from 1884 to the present, with two 1884 platform buildings, 1925 platform building and waiting shed, 1962 parcels office, and 1920s Gleeson Avenue overbridge demonstrating its development over time, including the adaptation of the 1884 wayside platform buildings for island platform use.

Of aesthetic and historical significance, the platform building awnings demonstrate the range of awnings used on railway buildings from the small original awning of two bays on the Platform 2/3 building (the original minor platform) to the addition of cantilevered awnings in 1925. All platform buildings are of aesthetic significance as good representative examples of their types and periods. The 1914 footbridge structure and stairs were of aesthetic and historical associational significance as a representative haunched beam structure and stair manufactured by Dorman Long & Co. engineers. The surviving interior and exterior detailing of the 1884 platform buildings and awnings is considered rare on the Illawarra line, with other examples at St. Peters, Tempe and Rockdale.

Sydenham railway station was listed on the New South Wales State Heritage Register on 2 April 1999 having satisfied the following criteria.

The place is important in demonstrating the course, or pattern, of cultural or natural history in New South Wales.

Sydenham Railway Station is of historical significance as a major junction station developed from 1884 to the present. Sydenham Railway Station is of historical significance as a station which demonstrates its development over time, retaining two 1884 platform buildings, along with a 1914 overhead footbridge structure and stairs, 1925 and 1962 platform buildings. The development of the station over time has included the adaptation of wayside buildings for island use.

The place is important in demonstrating aesthetic characteristics and/or a high degree of creative or technical achievement in New South Wales.

The Sydenham Railway Station platform buildings are of aesthetic significance as fine examples of railway platform building designs from 1884 to 1962, and the platform building awnings demonstrate the range of awnings used on railway buildings from the small original awning of two bays on the No 2/3 Platform building (the original minor platform) to the addition of cantilevered awnings on the rear of the buildings.

The 1884 platform buildings are of aesthetic significance as good representative examples of their type and the later island platforms illustrates the contrast in styles and philosophy between the different periods of construction. The 1914 footbridge structure and stairs are of aesthetic significance as a representative haunched beam footbridge manufactured by Dorman Long & Co engineers.

The place has strong or special association with a particular community or cultural group in New South Wales for social, cultural or spiritual reasons.

The place has the potential to contribute to the local community's sense of place, and can provide a connection to the local community's past.

The place possesses uncommon, rare or endangered aspects of the cultural or natural history of New South Wales.

The station as a whole is rare, retaining structures from the first period of construction of the Illawarra line up to the 1960s. The Platform 2/3 building at Sydenham is rare, as only five stations on the Illawarra line retain an 1880s 3rd Class platform building (other examples at Carlton, Rockdale, St. Peters, and Wollongong). The 2nd class brick Platform 4/5 building at Sydenham is rare, as only three stations on the Illawarra line retain platform buildings of this type and period (other examples at Arncliffe and Tempe).

The place is important in demonstrating the principal characteristics of a class of cultural or natural places/environments in New South Wales.

The platform buildings, awnings, footbridge, stairs, and overbridge are representative of railway structure designs over time from 1884 to 1962.

== Trackplan ==
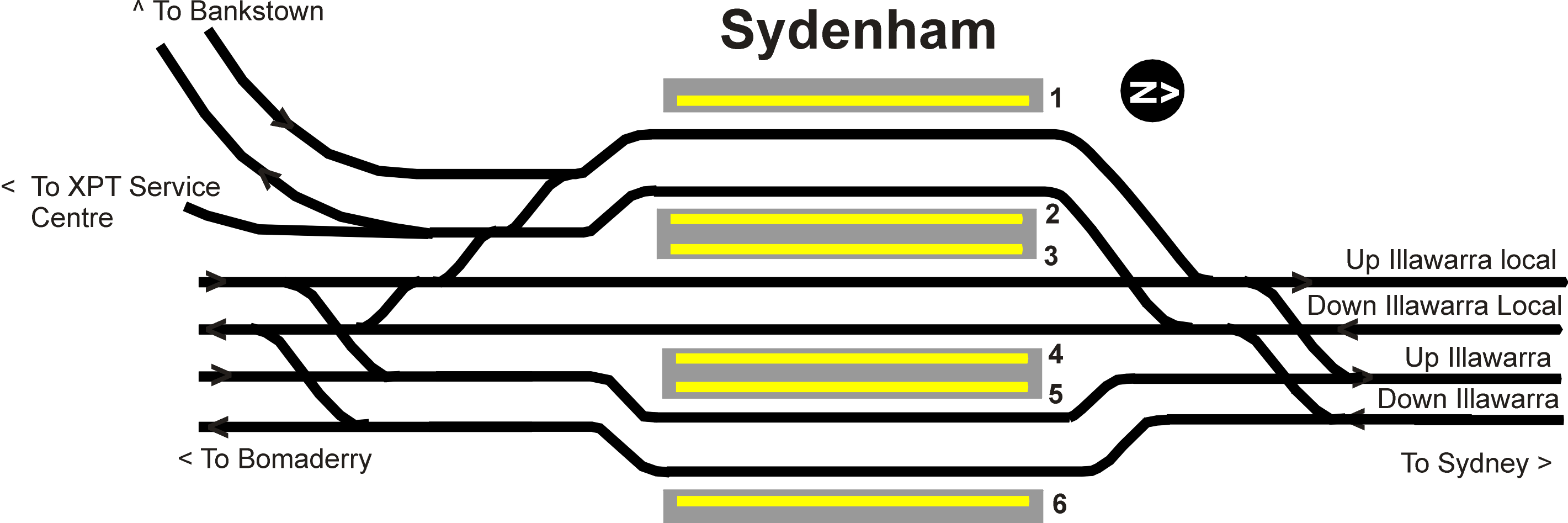
Track arrangement at Sydenham (1962 – December 2019) Note: The link from the Down Bankstown line to the Goods line is not shown.

== Gallery ==
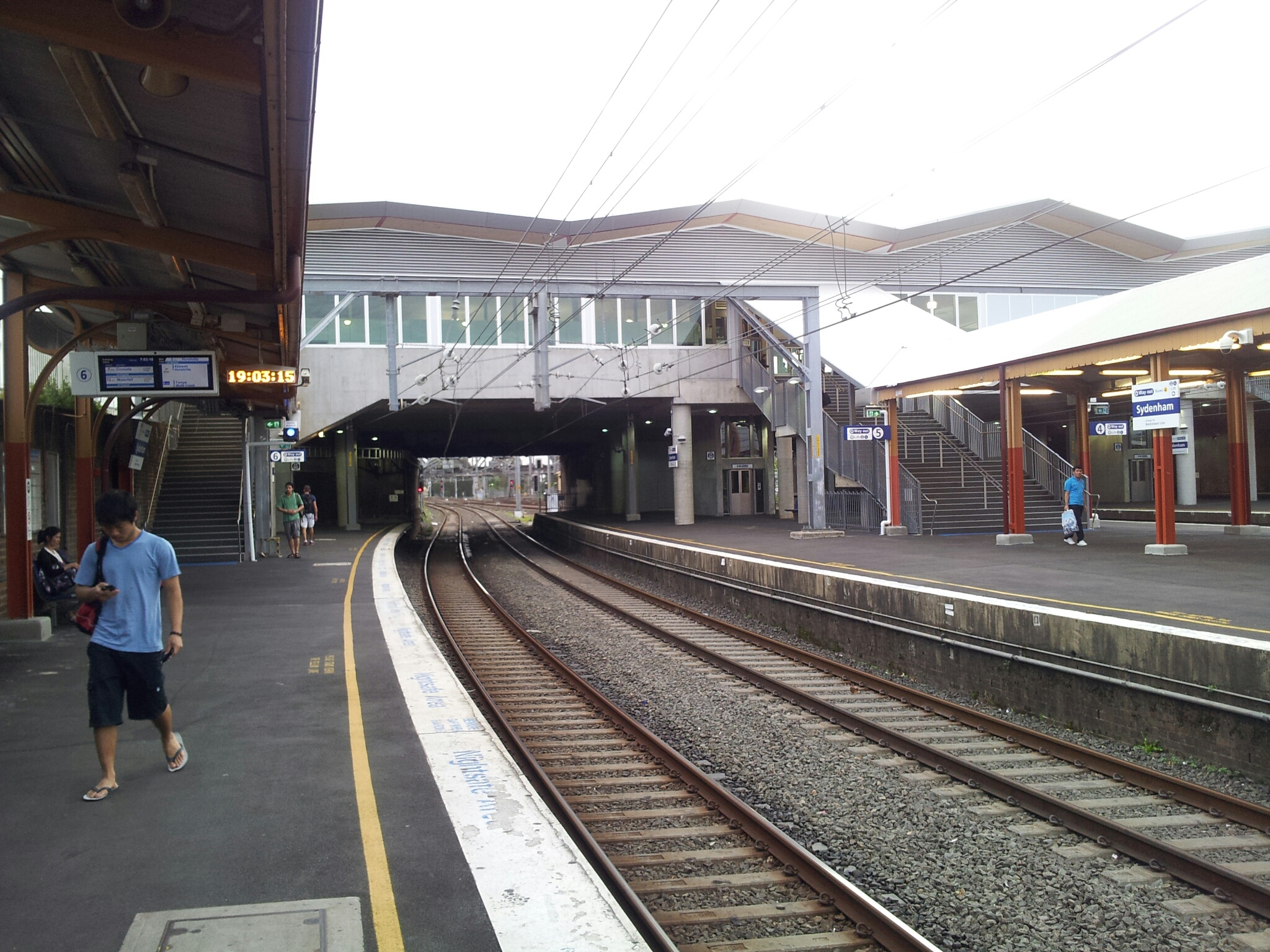
The main concourse

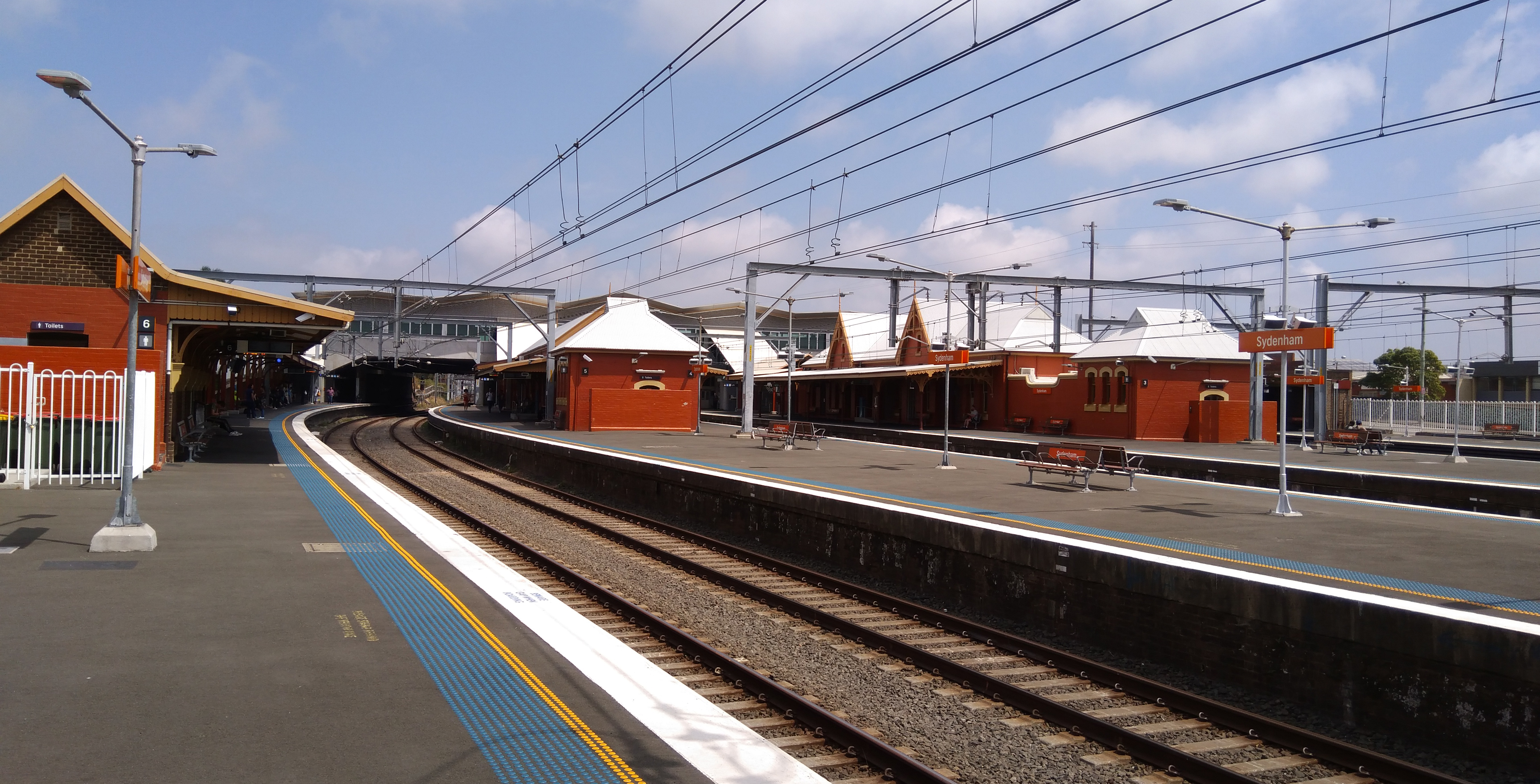
Station platforms

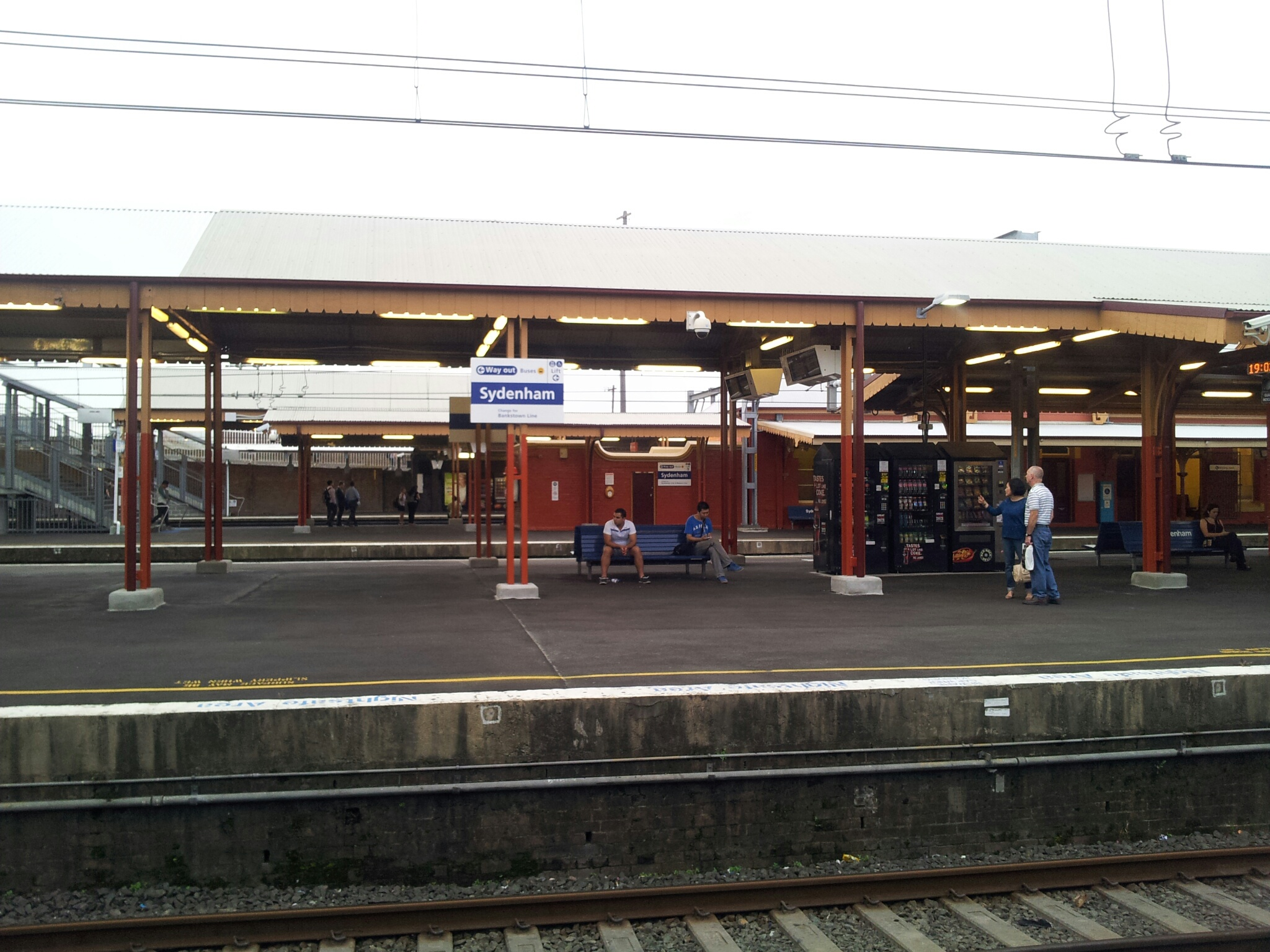
View across the platforms, from platform 6

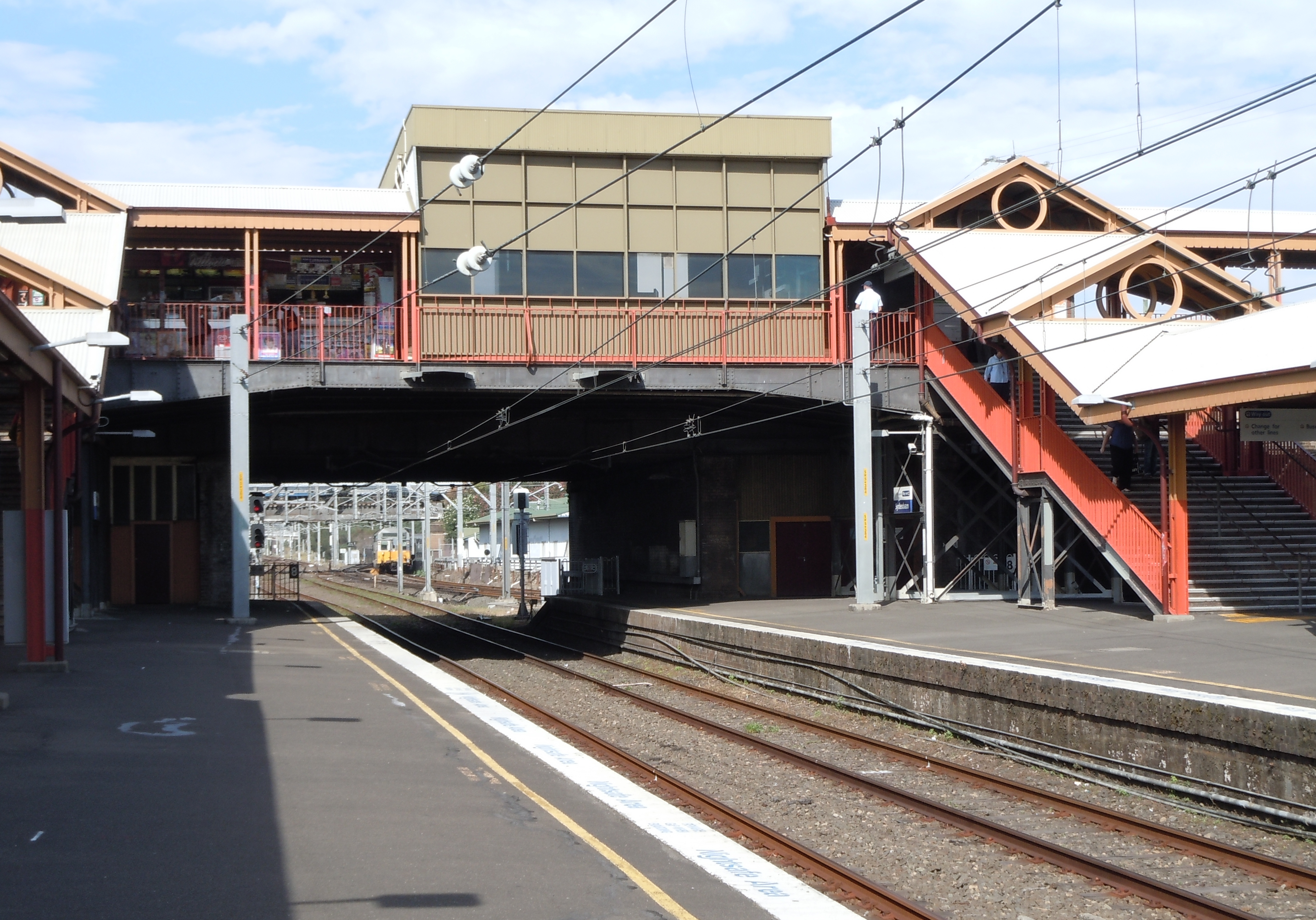
The former concourse and footbridge

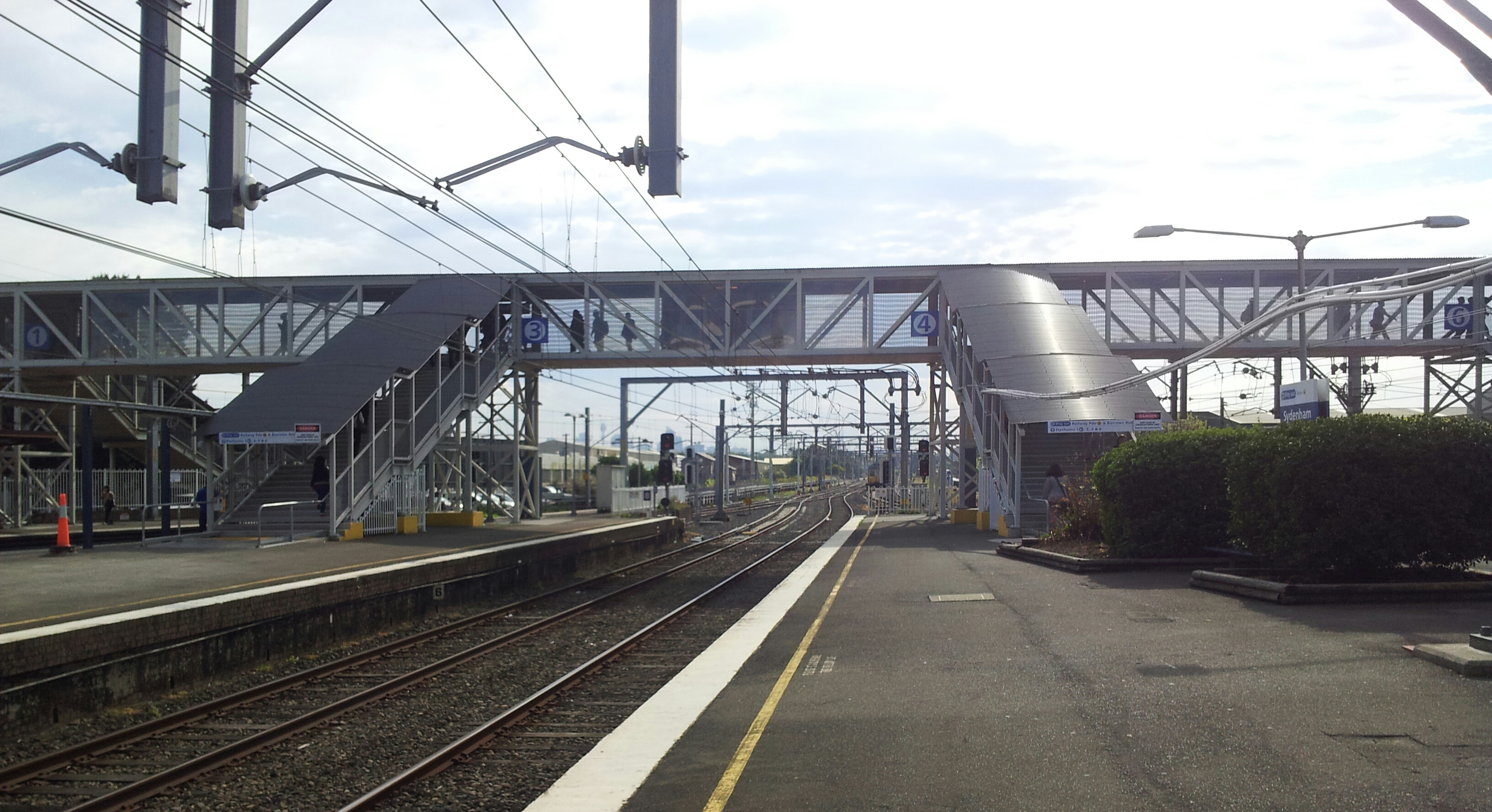
Temporary footbridge in place while the concourse was rebuilt
