= Wenona School =

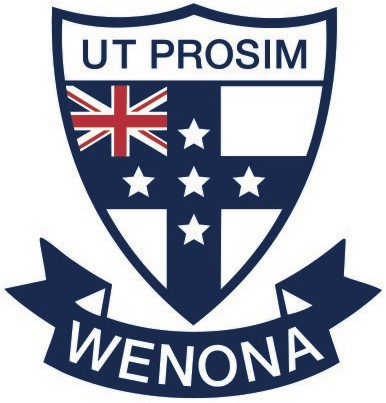

Location
- 176 Walker Street; North Sydney; North Sydney, New South Wales, 2060; Australia; 33°50′1″S 151°12′32″E

Information
- Former names: Woodstock School
- Type: Independent single-sex primary and secondary day and boarding
- Motto: Latin: Ut Prosim (That I May Serve)
- Established: 1886; 140 years ago
- Founder: Miss Edith Hooke
- Educational authority: NSW Department of Education
- Chairman: Catherine West
- Principal: Ms Linda Douglas
- Teaching staff: 132.3 FTE (2025)
- Years: K–12
- Enrolment: 1385 (2025)
- Colours: Navy blue, red and white
- Slogan: Empowering young women to serve and shape their world
- Affiliations: Independent Primary School Heads of Australia; Australian Boarding Schools' Association; Alliance of Girls' Schools Australasia; Association of Heads of Independent Girls' Schools
- Website: www.wenona.nsw.edu.au

Wenona School is an independent, non-denominational, day and boarding school for girls, located in the Sydney suburb of North Sydney, in New South Wales, Australia.

Founded by Miss Edith Hooke in 1886 as Woodstock School, Wenona has a non-selective enrolment policy and currently caters for approximately 1,350 students from Kindergarten to Year 12, including 50 boarders in Years 7 to 12.

The school is affiliated with the Independent Primary School Heads of Australia (IPSHA), the Australian Boarding Schools' Association (ABSA), the Alliance of Girls' Schools Australasia (AGSA), and the Association of Heads of Independent Girls' Schools (AHIGS).

Wenona Principal, Ms Linda Douglas, is an Executive Governing Director of the International Coalition of Girls' Schools.

== History ==
Woodstock School was founded in 1886 by Edith Hooke who was prominent in educational circles at the time. Miss Hooke selected the motto Ut Prosim, that I may serve, which she transferred to Wenona School in April 1913, a preparatory school with the same colours and crest and an enrolment of 40 which she established in place of Woodstock. The close relationship between the schools is reflected in the name Wenona, thought to have been chosen by the school's founder, a devotee of Longfellow, from his poem The Song of Hiawatha, in which Wenonah is a first-born daughter.

When the founder left the school in February 1920 due to an illness in her family, Ms Messiter, a former pupil of Woodstock, stepped in to watch over the school. Another former Woodstock student, Edith Marion Ralston, became Principal and owner later in 1920. In 1922, she moved the school to its current site in Walker Street, North Sydney, through the purchase of an extensive property, and opened the school's first boarding house. In 1930 there were 200 students and Ralston bought three surrounding properties to allow for further expansion. When World War II started she refused to relocate the school deciding that "Business as Usual" should be the school's approach. Ralston was a strong personality and she rose to be the President of the Headmistresses' Association of Australia. When she retired and sold the school to a non-profit in 1959 there were 650 girls in the school.

== Principals ==
The following individuals have served as Principal of Wenona School:

Ordinal	Officeholder	Term start	Term end	Time in office	Notes
1	Edith Hooke	1886	1920	33–34 years	
2	Dorothy Messiter	1920	1920	0 years	Acting
3	Edith M. Ralston	1920	1963	42–43 years	
4	Frances M. Mills	1963	1966	2–3 years	
5	Barbara Jackson	1967	1994	26–27 years	
6	Margaret Hadley	1995	2007	11–12 years	
7	Denise Thomas	2007	2007	0 years	Acting
8	Dr Kerrie Wilde	2008	2010	1–2 years	
9	Dr Elizabeth Guy	2010	2011	0–1 years	Co-acting Principals
9	Julie Wiseman	2010	2011	0–1 years	Co-acting Principals
10	Dr Briony Scott	2011	2024	14–15 years	
11	Ms Linda Douglas	2025			

== Campus ==
Situated on Miller and Walker Streets in North Sydney, Wenona comprises a Junior School (Kindergarten to Year 6), including Woodstock Infants and Hooke Primary, a Middle School (Years 7 to 8), an Upper School (Years 9 to 10), and a Senior College (Years 11 to 12). Up to 50 boarders are housed in the heritage Messiter and Ralston Houses. An Evening Study Centre is staffed by teachers four evenings a week for Senior College Students. Sporting facilities include a gymnasium including cricket nets, a tennis court and many more courts and indoor fields; a smaller gymnasium catering to dance and circuit activities; a 25-metre indoor swimming pool; and a weights room.

== Co-curriculum ==
=== Music and performing arts ===
Music is compulsory in a number of junior and middle school years and for elective music students in Years 9 to 12. Music groups include vocal ensemble, senior choir, middle school choir, junior choir, infants choir, contemporary vocal group and petite voices. There are three rock bands which perform in an annual rock concert combining dance, vocals and instrumental music. The school also offers wind symphony, concert band, stage band, brass ensembles, flute, clarinet, and saxophone ensembles as well as string groups and an orchestra.

The school runs a musical in both the senior and junior school, which alternates with the Performing Arts Showcase every second year. Musicals have included The Wizard of Oz, Kiss Me Kate, Little Shop of Horrors,High School Musical, Charlie and the Chocolate Factory and others. Other concerts include an annual choral concert, ensemble concert, carol service, rock concert, elective music concerts, and other events throughout the year.

Independent Theatre still operates in the building opened as the Coliseum Theatre in 1939, now run by Wenona School. The theatre provides the students a venue for the performing arts, as well as being a community facility.

=== Sport ===
Co-curricular sport is not compulsory at Wenona; however, students are encouraged to participate in competitive sport on Saturday mornings and at carnivals. Wenona teams participate in the competitions run by the Independent Primary School Heads of Australia (IPSHA) for primary students, and the Independent Girls' Schools Sporting Association (IGSA) for those in the Senior School.

Sports offered to junior students (Years 4 to 6) through IPSHA include: Basketball, Football, Hockey/Minkey, Touch Football, Netball, Tennis, Athletics, Swimming, Water Polo and Gymnastics. Junior Schools girls may also compete in Skiing, Snowboarding and AFL through a separate interschool competition.

Through the IGSA competition, Senior School students may participate in: Rhythmic gymnastics, Artistic gymnastics, Athletics, Basketball, Cricket, Cross country, Waterpolo, Diving, Swimming, Hockey, Tennis, Touch Football and Netball. External to IGSA, Wenona students may also participate in AFL, Equestrian, Indoor hockey, Indoor soccer, Fencing, skiing, snowboarding and Touch football.

=== STEM ===
In 2015, Wenona became the first girls’ school in NSW to offer Engineering Studies as an HSC subject. A year later, Wenona launched the Stage 5 STEM Elective, a two-year course for Years 9 and 10.

== Notable alumnae ==
Alumnae of Woodstock/Wenona are known as Old Girls or Wenonians, and may choose to join the school's alumni association, the Wenonians Inc. Notable Wenonians include:

=== Academic ===
- Ann Moyal AM – Author; Biographer; Social Historian of Science, Telecommunication and Technology; Recipient of the Centenary Medal 2003 (also attended Canberra High School)
- Beatrice Lilias Rennie – Headmistress and founder of Queenwood School for Girls

=== Medicine and the sciences ===
- Lindsay Dey – pioneer in paediatrics including developmental disabilities
- Shirley Jeffrey – marine biologist

=== Politics, public service and the law ===
- Annabelle Claire Bennett (née Darin) – judge
- Peta Seaton – former member of the New South Wales Legislative Assembly

=== Entertainment, media and the arts ===
- Ashleigh Cummings – actress
- Jacqueline McKenzie – film, stage and television actress, artist and singer.
- Lyndey Milan – food and cooking show personality
- Lucie Tiger O'Connor – Nashville-based award-winning singer, songwriter, and musician
- Wendy Paramor – artist
- April Rose Pengilly – model, actress
- Esha Tewari - Singer, songwriter
- Lucy Freyer - actress

=== Sport ===
- Hannah Buckling – Water polo player
- Alexandra Lisney – Bronze medalist at Paralympics
- Nicole Wickert – rugby union player

== See also ==
- List of non-government schools in New South Wales
- List of boarding schools in Australia
