= Edith Marion Ralston =

Australian school teacher (1894–1967)

Edith Marion Ralston MBE
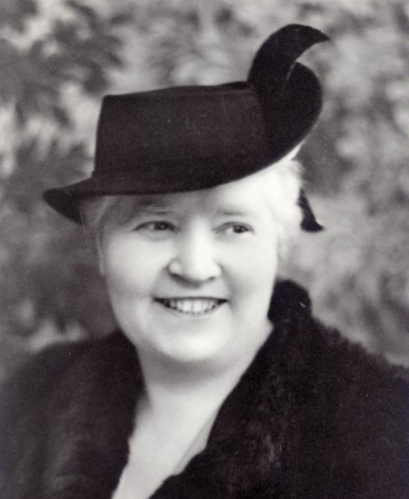
- Born: 21 June 1894; Ashfield
- Died: 16 October 1967 (aged 73); Cremorne
- Education: Wenona School et al
- Known for: expanding Wenona School
- Predecessor: Edith Hooke

Edith Marion Ralston MBE (21 June 1894 – 16 October 1967) was an Australian headmistress who owned and expanded Wenona School in Sydney. In 1959 she gave the school away to a non-profit company so that it could continue.

== Life ==
Ralston was born in 1894 in the Sydney suburb of Ashfield. She was the first of three children born to Irish immigrant Henrietta Marrianne (born Orr) and her Australian born husband John Thompson Ralston. In 1894 there was a collision between steam trains at Redfern railway station and her father, who was a solicitor, was injured. The family decided to move away from railways to a place where alternative transport was required.

During the first world war she was one of 6,000 Australian photographers who volunteered their time with the Young Men's Christian Association's Snapshots from Home League. The group organised free photos of home that could be sent to those serving abroad.

Ralston bought Wenona School which had been founded in 1886 when the founder left in 1920. There were 24 pupils. by Edith Hooke and she became its Principal. The school's motto and its name Wenona was chosen as the school's name by its founder. Wenona is from the poem The Song of Hiawatha. In 1922, she moved the school to its site in Walker Street in North Sydney. Her father put up some money to purchase another property, and this became school's first boarding house.

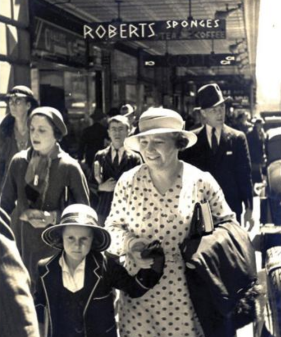
Ralston excorts a pupil

In 1930 there were 200 students and Ralston bought three more surrounding properties to allow for further expansion. When the war started she refused to relocate the school deciding that "Business as Usual" should be the school's approach. Ralston was a strong personality and she rose to be the President of the Headmistresses' Association of Australia. When she retired and sold the school, at a give away price, to a non-profit company in 1959 there were 650 girls in the school.

She was appointed a Member of the British Empire in the 1967 New Year Honours.

Ralston died in her home in the Sydney suburb of Cremorne and she was buried locally.
