= Erskineville railway station =

Railway station in Sydney, New South Wales, Australia

Erskineville
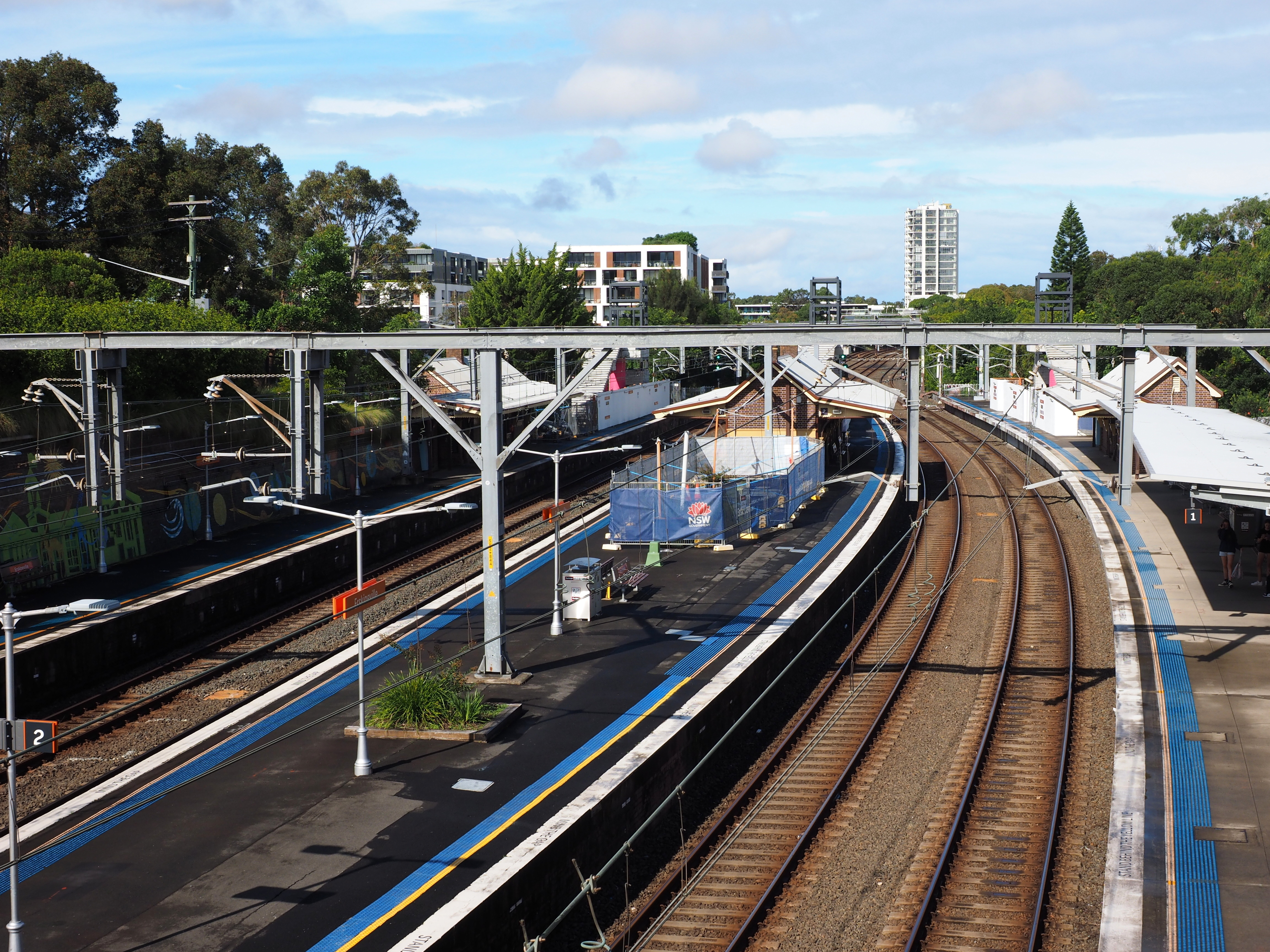
- Southbound view of the station platforms in April 2022

General information
- Location: Erskineville Road, Erskineville; Sydney, New South Wales; Australia
- Coordinates: 33°54′04″S 151°11′07″E
- Elevation: 20 metres (66 ft)
- Owner: Transport Asset Manager of NSW
- Operator: Sydney Trains
- Line: South Coast
- Distance: 2.88 km (1.79 mi) from Central
- Platforms: 4 (2 side, 1 island)
- Tracks: 4
- Connections: Bus

Construction
- Structure type: Ground
- Accessible: Yes

Other information
- Status: Weekdays: Staffed: 6am to 7pm: Weekends and public holidays: Staffed: 8am to 4pm
- Station code: EKV
- Website: Transport for NSW

History
- Opened: 15 October 1884 (142 years ago)
- Rebuilt: 16 June 1912 (114 years ago)
- Electrified: Yes (from March 1926)

Passengers
- 2025: 1,227,101 (year); 3,362 (daily) (Sydney Trains)
- Rank: 114

Services
Preceding station	Sydney Trains	Following station
St Peters towards Sydenham or Campbelltown	Airport & South Line	Redfern towards City Circle
Eastern Suburbs & Illawarra Line does not stop here
Future services (Note: At a later date to be announced)
Preceding station	Sydney Trains	Following station
St Peters towards Waterfall or Cronulla	Eastern Suburbs & Illawarra Line	Redfern towards Bondi Junction
Former services
Preceding station	Sydney Trains	Following station
St Peters towards Lidcombe or Liverpool	Bankstown Line (until 2024)	Redfern towards City Circle
Location

Erskineville railway station is a suburban railway station located on the South Coast line, serving the Sydney suburb of Erskineville. It is served by Sydney Trains T8 Airport & South Line services.

== History ==
=== Early history ===
The original Erskineville station, situated on the north side of Erskineville Road, opened in 1884 as part of the construction of the Illawarra railway line to Hurstville. The line through Erskineville was later quadruplicated in the early 1910s. As part of these works, the station was relocated to the south side of the road overbridge and rebuilt with four platforms.

=== Link to Eastern Suburbs railway line ===
In the late 1970s, the underground Eastern Suburbs railway line was connected to the Illawarra railway line immediately north of Erskineville, creating Erskineville Junction. At the same time, additional platforms to the west of the station were partially built to enable sextuplication from Erskineville to Sydenham. This was abandoned as a cost-cutting exercise. The CityRail Clearways Project envisaged reviving this plan, with stopping trains serving only the newly completed western platforms. However, this project was cancelled in November 2008.

=== Accessibility upgrades ===
In 2021, proposed upgrades to the station were announced, involving the addition of a new southern footbridge, lifts and canopies. These upgrades were completed in 2024.

=== Service changes ===
Trains from the Bankstown railway line ceased calling at Erskineville in 2024 due to the conversion of that line for Sydney Metro services. Instead, T8 Airport & South services began stopping at the station from October 2024, alongside occasional T4 Eastern Suburbs & Illawarra services. From 15 November 2026, the station will fully switch to T4 Eastern Suburbs & Illawarra services.

== Services ==
=== Platforms ===
Platform	Line	Stopping pattern	Notes
1	Airport & South Line	services to Central & the City Circle	
2	Airport & South Line	services to Sydenham; 8 weekday evening peak services to Campbelltown	
3		not in use	T4 services sometimes stop when T8 is suspended for trackwork
4		not in use	T4 services sometimes stop when T8 is suspended for trackwork

=== Transport links ===
Transdev John Holland operates one bus route via Erskineville station, under contract to Transport for NSW:

- 355: Bondi Junction Interchange to Marrickville Metro

== Trackplan ==
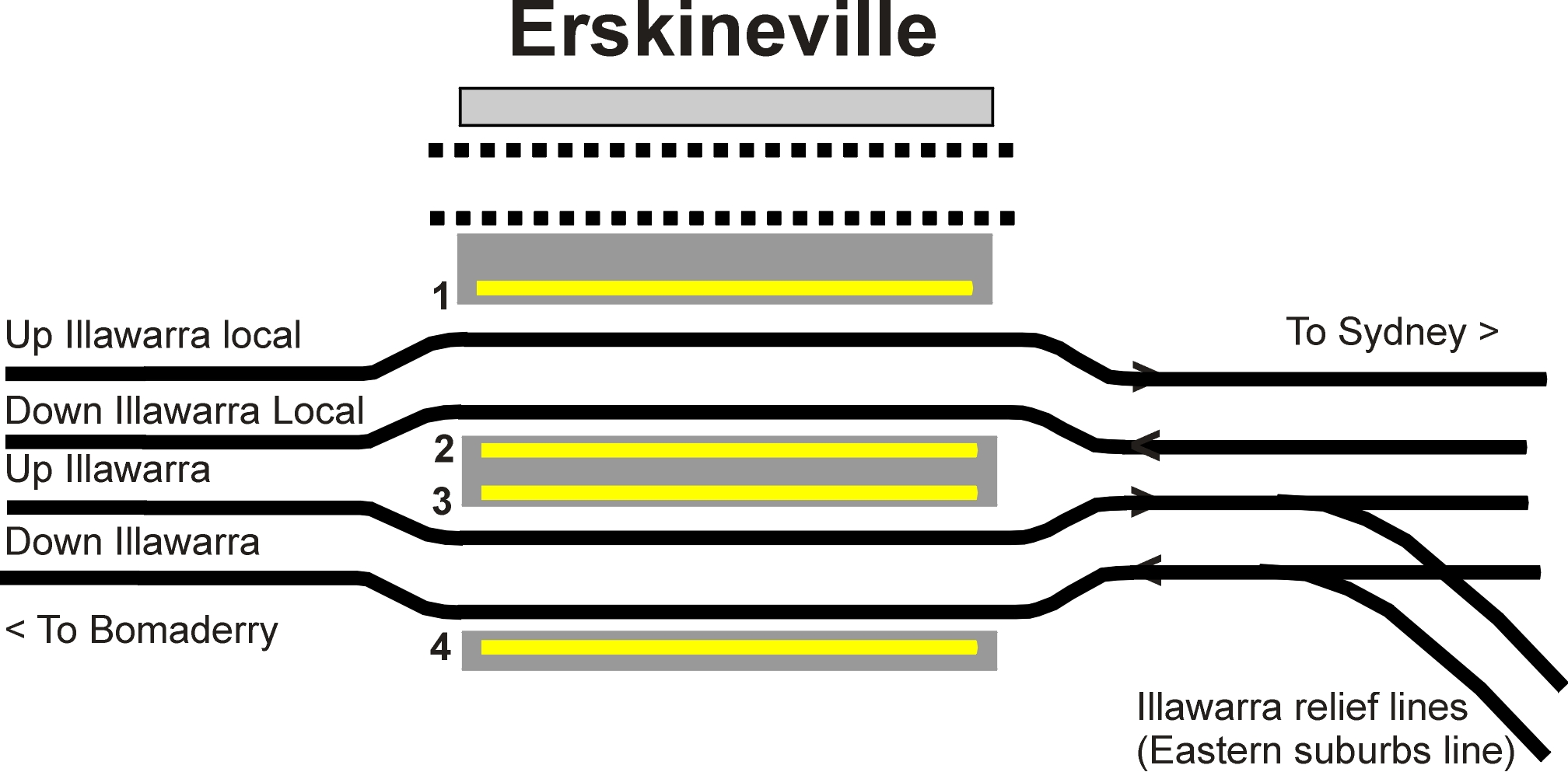
Track layout
