= St Peters railway station =

Railway station in Sydney, New South Wales, Australia

St Peters
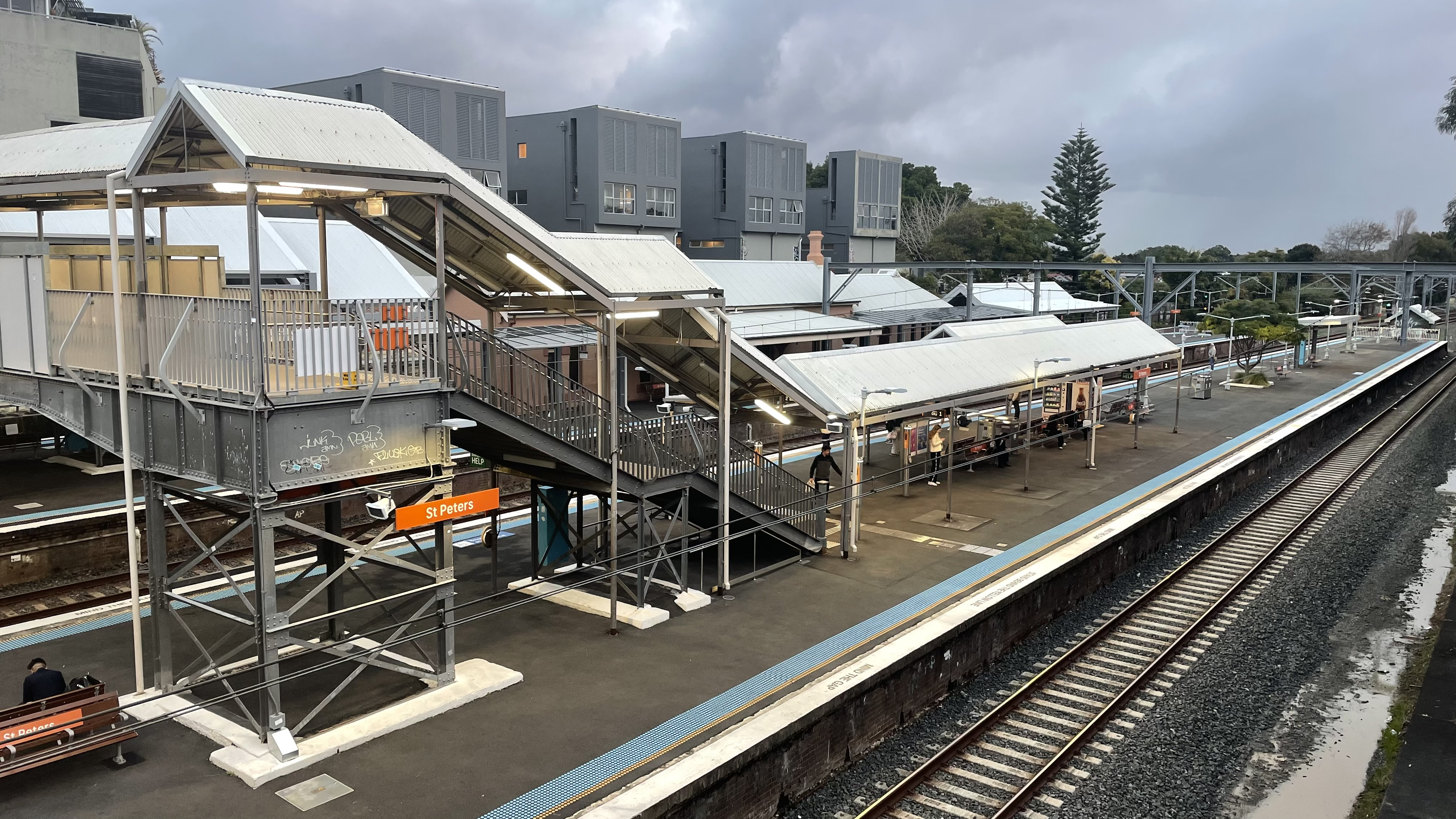
- Westbound view of Platform 1, showing the station's pedestrian footbridge and concourse, July 2024

General information
- Location: Princes Highway, St Peters
- Coordinates: 33°54′27″S 151°10′49″E
- Elevation: 15 metres (49 ft)
- Owner: Transport Asset Manager of New South Wales
- Operator: Sydney Trains
- Line: Illawarra
- Distance: 3.81 kilometres from Central
- Platforms: 4 (2 island)
- Tracks: 4
- Connections: Bus

Construction
- Structure type: Ground
- Accessible: Yes

Other information
- Status: Weekdays: Staffed: 6am to 7pm: Weekends and public holidays: Staffed: 8am to 4pm
- Station code: SAP
- Website: Transport for NSW

History
- Opened: 15 October 1884

Passengers
- 2025: 1,386,774 (year); 3,799 (daily) (Sydney Trains)
- Rank: 105

Services
Preceding station	Sydney Trains	Following station
Sydenham Terminus or towards Campbelltown	Airport & South Line	Erskineville towards City Circle
Eastern Suburbs & Illawarra Line does not stop here
Future services (Note: At a later date to be confirmed)
Preceding station	Sydney Trains	Following station
Sydenham towards Waterfall or Cronulla	Eastern Suburbs & Illawarra Line	Erskineville towards Bondi Junction
Former services
Preceding station	Sydney Trains	Following station
Sydenham towards Lidcombe or Liverpool	Bankstown Line (until 2024)	Erskineville towards City Circle
Location

St Peters railway station is a heritage-listed railway station on the Illawarra railway line in the Sydney suburb of St Peters. It is served by Sydney Trains' T8 Airport & South services. The station was added to the New South Wales State Heritage Register on 2 April 1999.

== History ==
=== Early history ===
St Peters station opened on 15 October 1884 as part of the construction of the Illawarra line to Hurstville. St Peters was one of the more substantial stations of the eight built in 1884 reflecting the importance of the locality for industry and residential development. The two brick side platform buildings were constructed as a large second-class station building (Platform 1/2, demolished) and a smaller third-class station building (on the current Platform 3/4) with a small footbridge at the "Down" end of the platforms.

In 1887, Josiah Gentle moved the Bedford Brickworks (established 1877 in Alexandria) to St Peters (located opposite the station on land which is now Sydney Park). This was one of the most important brickworks in Sydney in the late 19th century. The brickworks continued to operate at St Peters until the 1970s.

With quadruplification of the line in 1900, brick retaining walls were built at the station side boundaries. The original Platform 1/2 building was demolished in c. 1925 and replaced by a standard island platform building.

=== Unused platforms ===
To the west of the station lies an incomplete island platform. It was originally built in the 1970s as part of the construction of the Eastern Suburbs railway line when the Illawarra railway line between Erskineville and Sydenham was planned to be expanded to accommodate six tracks. This was abandoned as a cost-cutting exercise. The CityRail Clearways Project envisaged reviving this plan, with stopping trains serving only the newly completed western platforms. However, this project was cancelled in November 2008.

=== Accessibility upgrades ===
In 1990, the station building on the western platform was demolished and replaced by a waiting shelter.

In 2021, proposed upgrades to the station were announced, involving the addition of new lifts, canopies and pedestrian pathways. These upgrades were completed in 2024.

=== Service changes ===
Trains from the Bankstown railway line ceased calling at St Peters in 2024 due to the conversion of that line for Sydney Metro services. Instead, T8 Airport & South services began stopping at the station from October 2024, alongside occasional T4 Eastern Suburbs & Illawarra services. From 15 November 2026, the station will fully switch to T4 Eastern Suburbs & Illawarra services.

== Platforms and services ==
Platform	Line	Stopping pattern	Notes
1	Airport & South Line	services to Central & the City Circle	
2	Airport & South Line	services to Sydenham; 8 weekday evening peak services to Campbelltown	
3		not in use	T4 services sometimes stop when T8 is suspended for trackwork
4		not in use	T4 services sometimes stop when T8 is suspended for trackwork

== Transport links ==
Transdev John Holland operates one bus route via St Peters station, under contract to Transport for NSW:

- 370: Coogee to Glebe Point

Transit Systems operates two bus routes via St Peters station, under contract to Transport for NSW:

- 308: Eddy Avenue to Marrickville Metro
- 422: Railway Square to Kogarah

St Peters station is served by two NightRide routes:

- N10: Sutherland station to Town Hall station
- N11: Cronulla station to Town Hall station

== Description ==
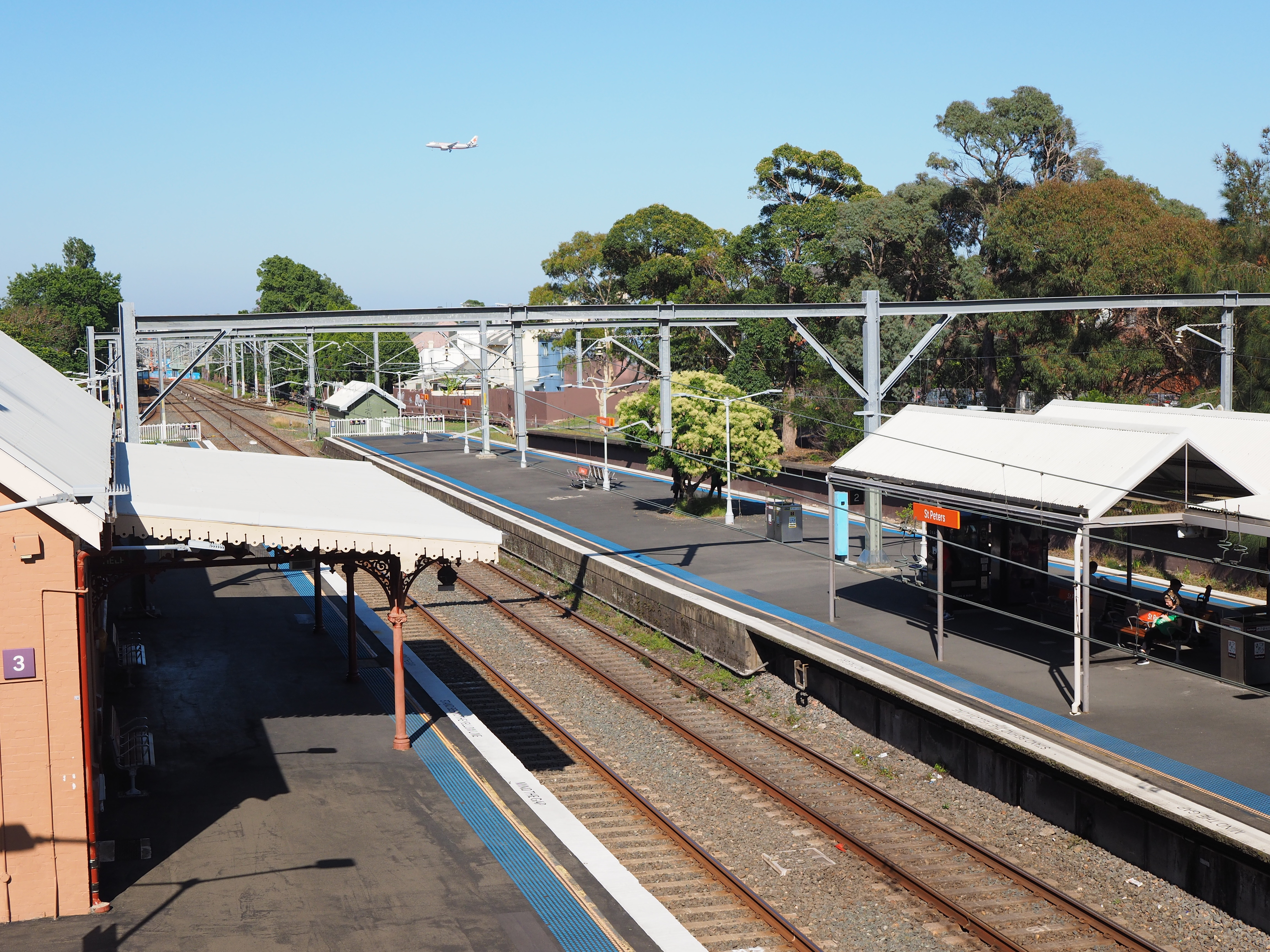
The platforms of St Peters railway station in 2020

St. Peters Railway Station is located on the Princes Highway (aka King Street) near the intersection with Sydney Park Road, to the west of the Princes Highway rail overbridge. The station is accessed via a footbridge from Lord Street, Newtown, and via a pedestrian pathway and then footbridge from the Princes Highway. The railway station is within a cutting with high brick retaining walls. There are two island platforms: Platform 3/4 on the southern side, and Platform 1/2 on the northern side, and another disused and overgrown island platform on the northern side of the station adjacent to Lord Street.

The station complex includes the Platform 3/4 building and three island platforms (1884), brick retaining walls (1900), footbridge (1914), King Street (Princes Highway) overbridge (c. 1900), overhead booking office and shop (1914, altered in c. 1949 and 1999) and platform 1/2 canopy (1990).

Platform 3/4 building (1884)

This is a painted brick third class single storey platform building, with an awning the full length of the building on the southern side, and an awning along part of the length of the building on the northern side. The building has two brick chimneys to a gabled corrugated steel roof. Awnings to Platform 3 have a decorative metal valance to the ends of the awning (note: this pattern also occurs at Sydenham). The building features moulded stucco sills and heads to windows, original late Victorian period timber double doors with arched fanlights, each fanlight having two vertical glazing bars. Windows are timber framed double hung. There is a timber tongue & grooved door opening onto Platform 4. The Platform 4 awning has a timber bargeboard and timber valance, and is cantilevered on steel posts and brackets. There is stop chamfered brickwork to window and door openings.

The interior is as follows: From east end: Room 1: very high plaster ceiling with plaster ceiling rose, marble mantelpiece, deteriorated timber floor, some wall linings missing. Room 2: ripple iron ceiling with metal ceiling rose, timber floor, fitted timber seating. Timber floor and fitted timber seating has visible termite damage. Room 3: timber floor, chimney breast, high plaster ceiling with plaster ceiling rose. Room 4: toilets with ripple iron ceiling with metal ceiling rose. Toilet fit out features toilet cubicles with late Victorian period timber 4-panel doors and architraves (possibly salvaged from elsewhere). Otherwise c.1970s toilet fit out.

It was reported to be in moderate condition as at 28 June 2009, with some damage to timber.

Island platforms (1884)

There are 3 island platforms: at the northern edge of the station adjacent to Lord Street a disused overgrown island platform; Platforms 1 and 2 with partly brick edges, partly concrete edges, and asphalt surfaces; and Platforms 3 & 4 at the southern side of the station with brick edges. Platform 4 is curved on its southern side.

Brick retaining walls (1900)

Brick retaining walls extend both sides of the railway station, and extend to the eastern side of the brick overbridge.

Footbridge (1914)

Access to the station is via a footbridge with a Dorman Long & Co steel structure with two sets of taper-haunched girders - one set for street access, the other for platform interchange, stairs, railings and star pattern newel posts. The footbridge has a hardie-board deck, and two brick supports underneath.

King Street (Princes Highway) overbridge (c. 1900

Brick overbridge over all lines.

Overhead booking office and shop (1914, altered c. 1949, 1999)

Located on the footbridge, the overhead booking office is extensively altered and includes a fibro ticket office with a hipped corrugated steel roof and a small fibro shop, also with a hipped corrugated steel roof, and a modern awning structure.

Platform 1/2 canopy (c. 1995)

A modern platform canopy structure with steel posts on concrete bases and a corrugated steel roof. This replaced a 1914 platform building demolished c. 1995.

Integrity

The Platform 3/4 building is remarkably intact including its interior. The footbridge has been redecked but its otherwise intact. The station as a whole lacks integrity due to the loss of the Platform 1/2 building.

=== Modifications and dates ===
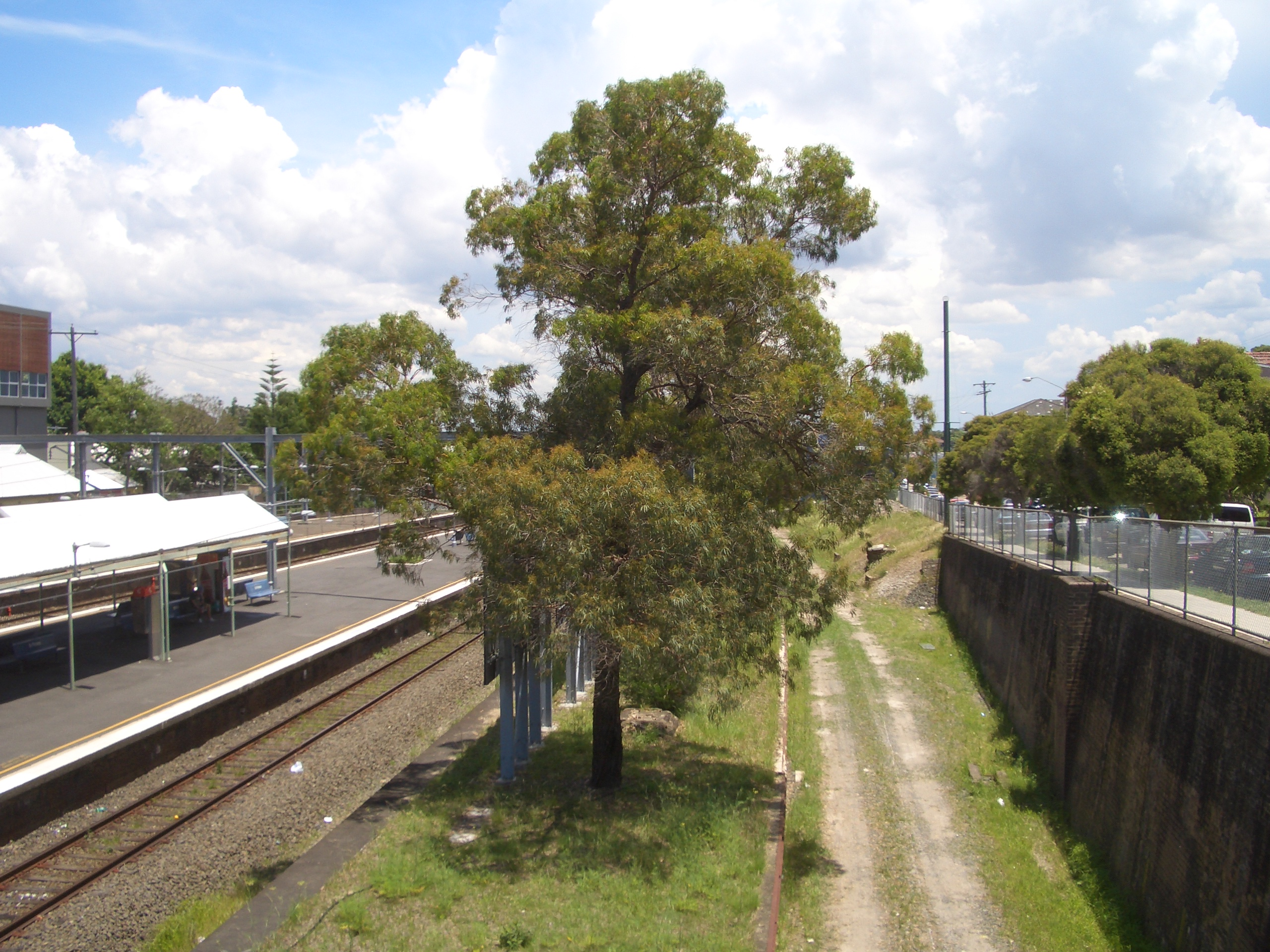
The incomplete island platform at St Peters railway station

- 1900: quadruplication of the line, construction of brick retaining walls, new King St overbridge
- 1908: platforms extended
- 1914: the 1884 Platform 1/2 building was demolished and replaced, footbridges and overhead booking office constructed.
- c. 1949: overhead booking office extensively altered and shop built on footbridge
- 1995: The 1914 Platform 1/2 building demolished and platform canopy built in its place
- 1999–2000: Footbridge: Hardie board decks and recladding of footbridge buildings; Platform 3/4 building: re-roofed, reinforced glass to some windows; extensive alterations to overhead booking office.

== Heritage listing ==
This is a good example of a standard early second class building and forms part of a group of structures in the area that indicate the early history of the station. It also demonstrates adaptability with the original small 2 bay awning on one face and the later cantilevered awning to the rear or former street facade of the building. It is the last remnant at the site of the early period of railway development. Brick retaining walls are a significant part of the heritage as the railway builders sought to locate lines in restricted space without resuming too much property.

St Peters railway station was listed on the New South Wales State Heritage Register on 2 April 1999 having satisfied the following criteria.

The place is important in demonstrating the course, or pattern, of cultural or natural history in New South Wales.

St. Peters Railway Station is of historical significance as one of the earliest stations on the Illawarra Line and for its role in the development of the St Peters/Newtown area since 1884. Developed from 1884 to the present, St. Peters Railway Station demonstrates its development over time, retaining an 1884 platform building on Platform 3/4 and 1884 brick faced platforms; brick retaining walls and overbridge (1900) and Dorman Long & Co steel footbridge and stairs (1914).

The place has a strong or special association with a person, or group of persons, of importance of cultural or natural history of New South Wales's history.

The steel footbridge and stairs have historical association with the renowned engineering firm Dorman Long & Co. which designed and manufactured these structures.

The place is important in demonstrating aesthetic characteristics and/or a high degree of creative or technical achievement in New South Wales.

St. Peters Railway Station, with its platform building, brick retaining walls, brick overbridge and steel footbridge and stairs is of aesthetic significance as a collection of late 19th to early 20th century railway station structures.

The fine third class Platform 3/4 building is of aesthetic significance as a simple late Victorian station building with awnings which demonstrate adaptability, having an original small 2 bay awning on Platform 3, and a later cantilevered awning to Platform 4 (the former street facade), demonstrating trends in Railway architecture in this time period.

The 1914 haunched beam steel footbridge structure and stairs designed and manufactured by renowned engineers Dorman Long & Co is of aesthetic/technical significance as a well designed engineering structure of this period and for its decorative features such as stair railings and star pattern newel posts.

The place has strong or special association with a particular community or cultural group in New South Wales for social, cultural or spiritual reasons.

The place has the potential to contribute to the local community's sense of place, and can provide a connection to the local community's past.

The place possesses uncommon, rare or endangered aspects of the cultural or natural history of New South Wales.

The surviving interior and exterior detailing of the 1884 Platform 3/4 building and its awnings is considered rare on the Illawarra Line (one of only five stations on the Illawarra line with 3rd class platform building).

The place is important in demonstrating the principal characteristics of a class of cultural or natural places/environments in New South Wales.

The 1884 Platform 3/4 building is representative of 1880s railway station platform building design, being a standard third class platform building. It is very intact, including interiors. The 1914 footbridge is one of a number of examples of Dorman Long & Co steel footbridges of this period on the Illawarra Line (other examples at St. Peters, Erskineville).
