= Redfern railway station =

Railway station in Sydney, New South Wales, Australia

Redfern
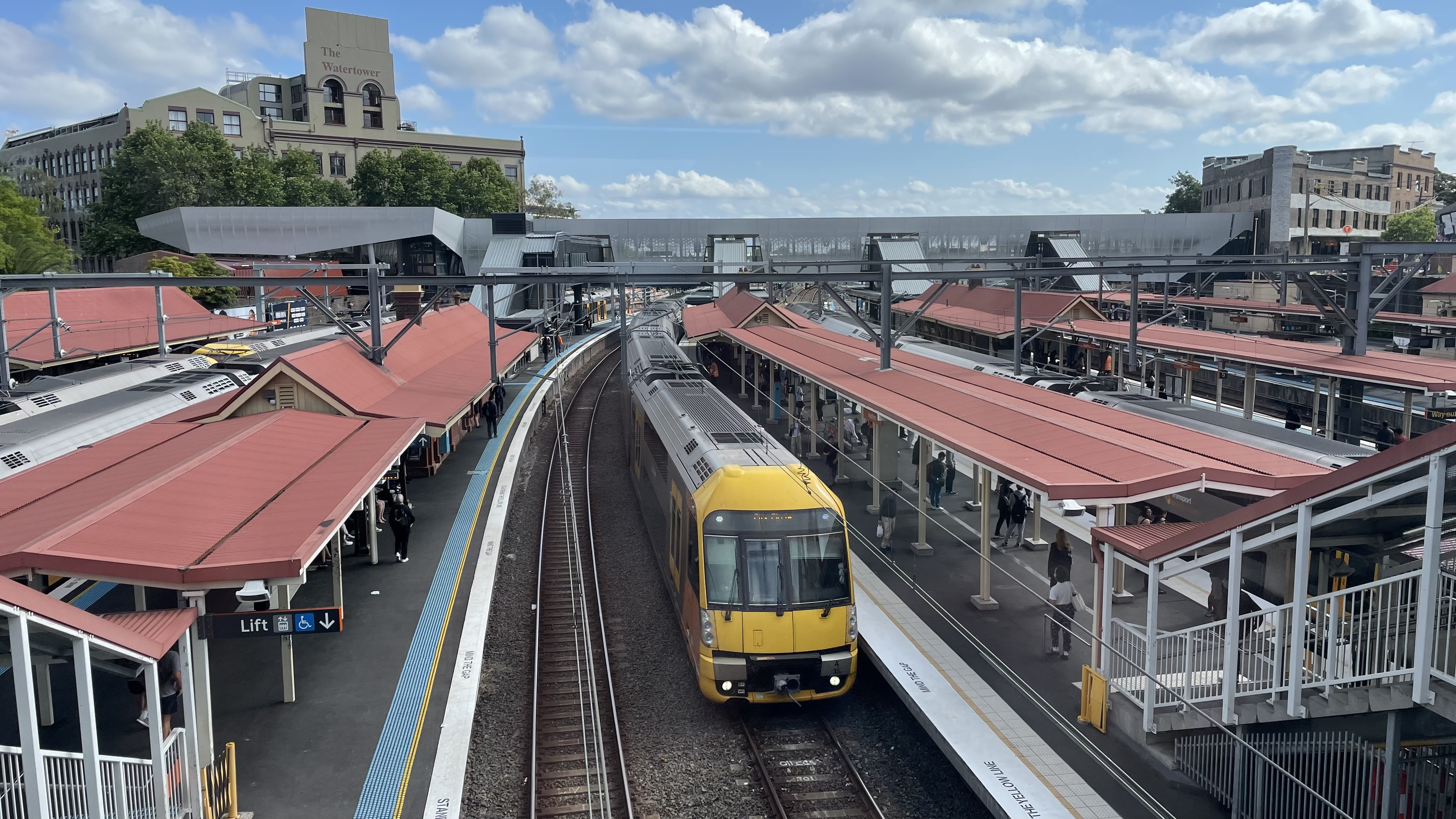
- Southbound view of Platforms 5 and 6, taken from the northern concourse in October 2023

General information
- Location: Lawson Street, Redfern; Sydney, New South Wales; Australia
- Coordinates: 33°53′31″S 151°11′55″E
- Elevation: 29 metres (95 ft)
- Owner: Transport Asset Manager of NSW
- Operator: Sydney Trains
- Lines: Main Suburban; Eastern Suburbs
- Distance: 1.3 km (0.81 mi) from Central
- Platforms: 12 (5 island, 2 side)
- Tracks: 12
- Connections: Bus

Construction
- Structure type: Ground (10 platforms); Underground (2 platforms)
- Accessible: Yes (Platforms 1–10 only)
- Architect: John Whitton
- Architectural style: Federation Queen Anne

Other information
- Status: Staffed
- Station code: REF
- Website: Transport for NSW

History
- Opened: 1876 (150 years ago)
- Rebuilt: 21 October 1906 (120 years ago)
- Electrified: Yes (from March 1926)
- Former names: Eveleigh (1876–1906)

Passengers
- 2025: 14,066,249 (year); 38,538 (daily) (Sydney Trains)
- Rank: 7
Services
Preceding station	Sydney Trains	Following station
Strathfield towards Emu Plains or Richmond	T1 North Shore & Western Line	Central towards Berowra
Burwood (one weekday morning peak service) One-way operation	T1 North Shore & Western Line	Central towards Berowra
Macdonaldtown towards Parramatta or Leppington	T2 Leppington & Inner West Line	Central towards City Circle
Newtown towards Leppington	T2 Leppington & Inner West Line	Central towards City Circle
Macdonaldtown towards Liverpool	T3 Liverpool & Inner West Line	Central towards City Circle
Newtown towards Liverpool	T3 Liverpool & Inner West Line (weekdays only)	Central towards City Circle
Sydenham towards Waterfall or Cronulla	T4 Eastern Suburbs & Illawarra Line	Central towards Bondi Junction
Strathfield towards Olympic Park	T7 Olympic Park Line (special events only)	Central Terminus
Erskineville towards Macarthur	T8 Airport & South Line	Central towards City Circle
Burwood towards Hornsby	T9 Northern Line	Central towards Gordon
Preceding station	Intercity Trains	Following station
Strathfield towards Katoomba or Mount Victoria	Blue Mountains Line (weekday peak only)	Central Terminus
Strathfield towards Newcastle Interchange	Central Coast & Newcastle Line (weekday peak only)	Central Terminus
Wolli Creek towards Kiama	South Coast Line	Central Terminus
Wolli Creek towards Kiama	South Coast Line (morning and evening services)	Central towards Bondi Junction
Sydenham towards Kiama	South Coast Line (limited weekday morning and evening services)	Central towards Bondi Junction
NSW TrainLink Western Line does not stop here
NSW TrainLink North Western Line does not stop here
NSW TrainLink North Coast Line does not stop here

New South Wales Heritage Register
- Official name: Redfern Railway Station group; Tenterfield railway
- Type: State heritage (built)
- Designated: 2 April 1999
- Reference no.: 1234
- Type: Railway Platform/Station
- Category: Transport – Rail
- Builders: Department of Railways
Location

Redfern railway station is a heritage-listed major suburban railway station located on the Main Suburban line and Eastern Suburbs line, serving the Sydney suburb of Redfern. It is served by Sydney Trains T1 North Shore & Western Line, T2 Leppington & Inner West Line, T3 Liverpool & Inner West Line, T4 Eastern Suburbs & Illawarra Line, T8 Airport & South Line and T9 Northern Line services, as well as intercity Blue Mountains Line, Central Coast & Newcastle Line and South Coast Line services. It is also served by T7 Olympic Park Line services during special events only.

Redfern was designed by John Whitton and built by the Department of Railways. The property was added to the New South Wales State Heritage Register on 2 April 1999, under the name Redfern Railway Station group, with Tenterfield railway listed as an alternative name.

== History ==
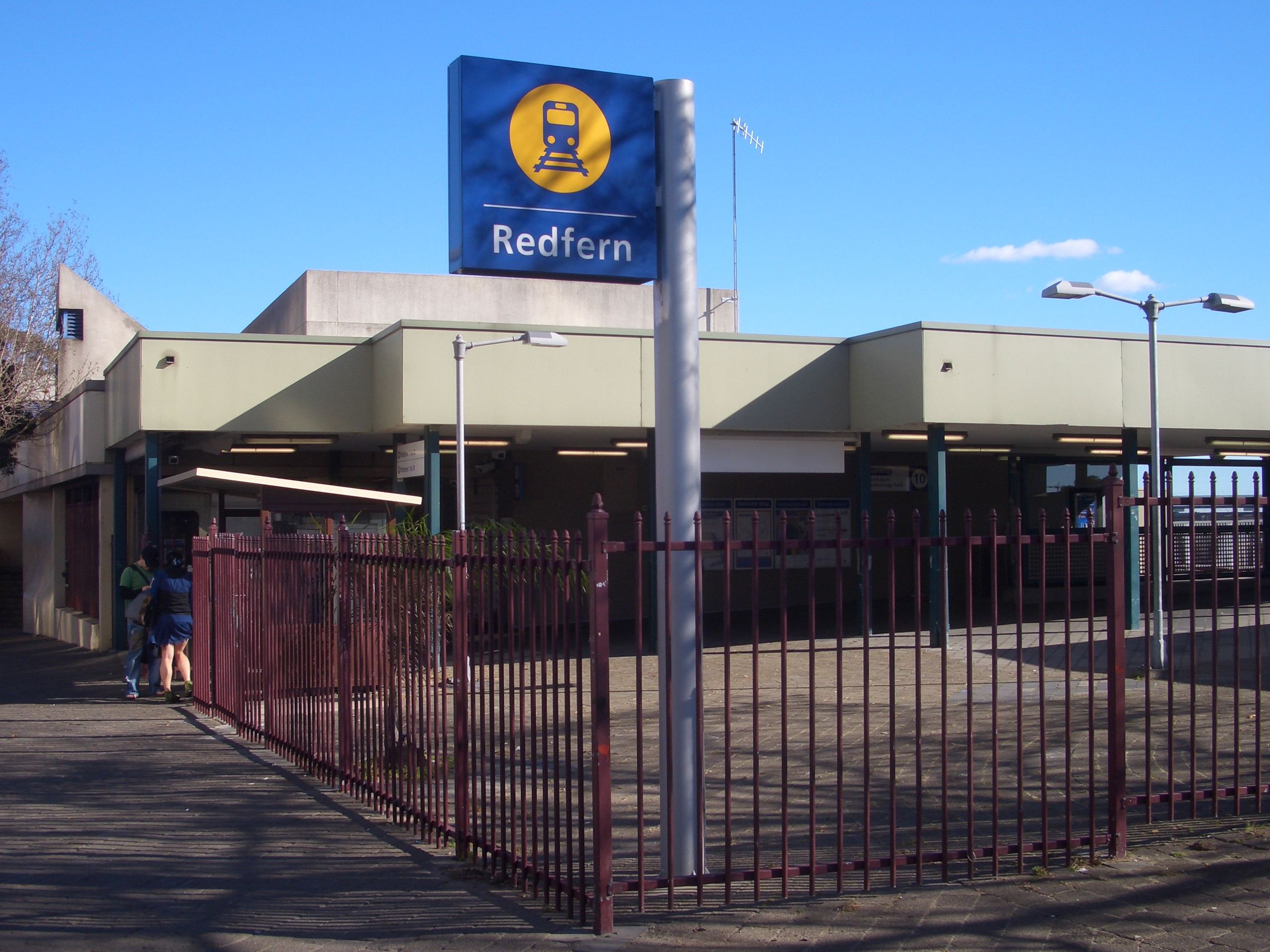
Former Gibbons Street entrance in July 2007

=== Redfern railway station ===
In the early history of the New South Wales Government Railways, Redfern station was the frequently used but unofficial name of the principal Sydney terminus, a fact which has led to persistent confusion. That station, the first Sydney Terminal, was north of Cleveland Street, which is Redfern's northern boundary, and south of Devonshire Street. It opened on 26 September 1855 in an area known as Cleveland Fields which is now the railway corridor called Sydney Yard. This original 'Redfern' station comprised one wooden platform in a corrugated iron shed, with the station's name honouring William Redfern. The station was built of iron and the first stationmaster was a Mr Fielding. As traffic increased, the original station was replaced in 1874 by a brick and stone building containing two platforms. This second station, the second Sydney Terminal which grew to 14 platforms, was designed for through traffic if the lines were extended in the city direction. This second station was found to be too far from the city centre, so a new station (the present Sydney Central station) was built to the north of Devonshire Street and opened on 4 August 1906. The 1874 station was soon demolished.

A station was opened in 1876 1.3 kilometres (1 mi) west of the original Redfern and named Eveleigh, after an old home located on the western side of the railway line. In 1885, Eveleigh's platforms were reconstructed at its present site, and Eveleigh Station was renamed Redfern on 21 October 1906, shortly after the current Central railway station opened on the site of the former Devonshire Street cemetery.

Redfern station had been opened to serve the Eveleigh railway workshops, the first stage of which was completed in 1887, as well as the inner-city residential and industrial suburb of Redfern, one of Sydney's most densely populated residential areas. The name Eveleigh was retained for the railway workshops, just beyond the station, on the site of the original Hutchinson Estate, now part of the present suburb of Eveleigh. In 1894, there was a steam train collision at the station that resulted in eleven people being killed and several others being injured, including John Ralston.

By the 1940s, three-quarters of Sydney factory workers worked within a three-mile radius of Redfern station, and many commuted to work by train.

The original station consisted of three island platforms serving four lines. The ticket office was located on the corner of Lawson Street and Rosehill Street, with stairs down to each individual platform. Rosehill Street was demolished to make way for the later expansion of Redfern station to the east, while the ticket office survived and was later extended.

The construction of Redfern station was overseen by the office of John Whitton, engineer-in-chief of the NSW Railways. Whitton had been appointed in 1856 at the beginning of the NSW railway development and remained in the position until 1890, overseeing the establishment of the main body of the NSW system. The station was extended in 1891/92 to accommodate the quadruplication of the main suburban lines, with platforms 5, 6 and 7 being built during this period, platforms 8 and 9 in 1919 and platform 10 in 1924/1925. In 1913, a footbridge was erected at the southern end of the platforms to allow access to the Eveleigh workshops from the station for the workers. The footbridge extended across all the platforms with stairs down to each.

Work on underground platforms 11 and 12 began in the 1940s but did not finish until the 1970s when the Eastern Suburbs railway line was opened in 1979. The original plans of The City and Suburban Electric Railways (Amendment) Act of 1947 had included additional railway lines that were never completed, resulting in unfinished platforms and tunnels existing above the current platforms 11 and 12.

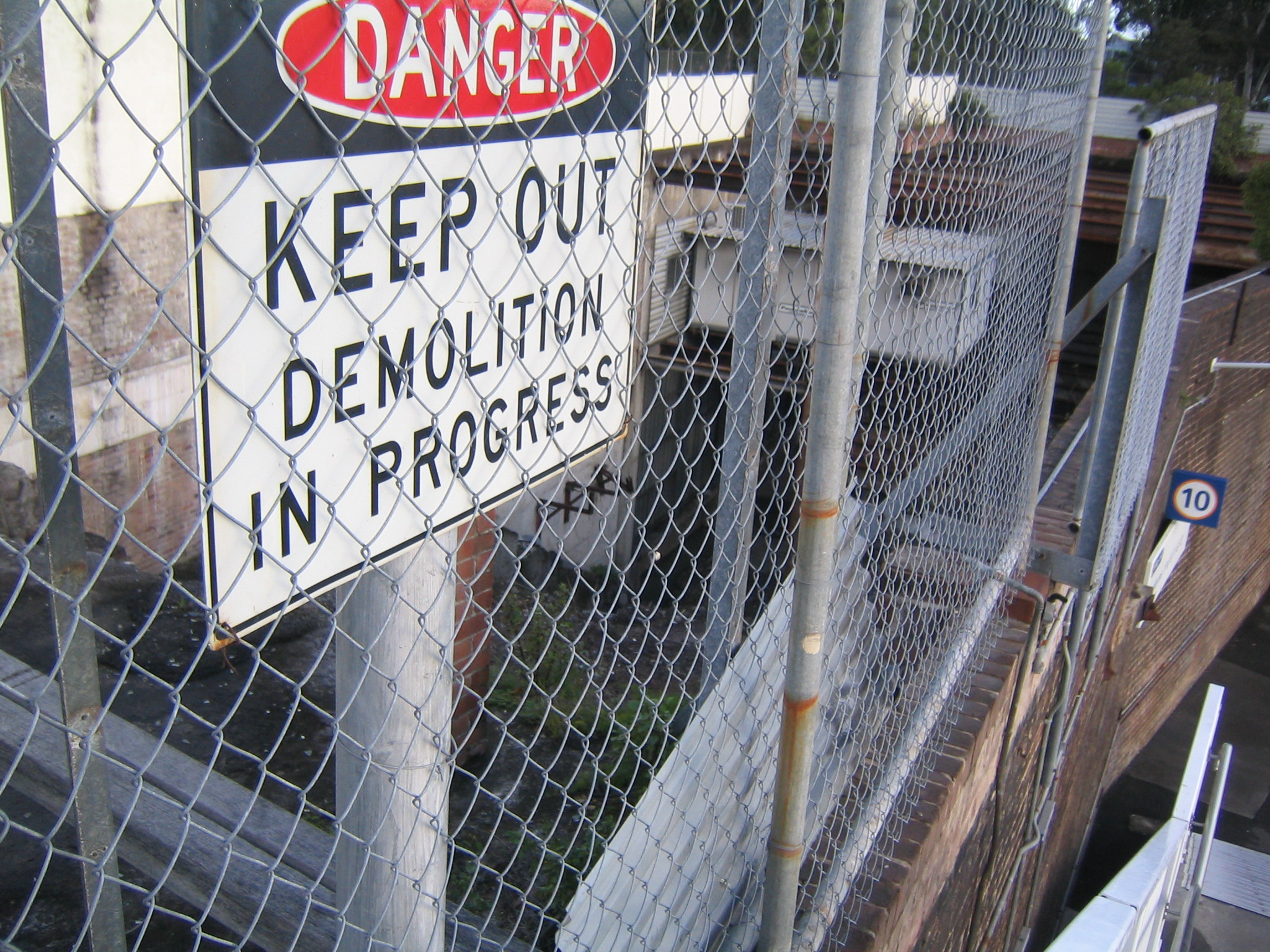
The incomplete platforms in July 2006

Until 1994, Redfern had an overhead footbridge at the Eveleigh end of the platforms, connecting platforms 1–10 by stairs. This was demolished because the funds for its maintenance were not available. Around 1994, the southern footbridge was removed as the Eveleigh railway workshops were gradually closed down and the footbridge was no longer required.

Around 1999, the station underwent a major upgrade, including the demolition of the northern footbridge and stairs to the platforms. A new footbridge and stairs were built, with only a pair of iron newel posts on platform 1 remaining of the earlier stairways. A single track tunnel was built for steam locomotives from Central station to access Eveleigh Railway Workshops. Known as the Engine Dive, the tunnel descends to the north of Platform 1 and surfaces at the southern end of Platform 10. A number of chimneys still exist, especially on Platform 1.

The present Redfern station was damaged by fire in the 2004 Redfern riots. The ticketing area and station master's office were significantly damaged, and the windows in the front of the station were bricked up for almost a year afterwards to prevent further attacks. They have since been replaced with glass windows.

A rising public concern about the lack of disability access to the station platforms led to a petition of over 50,000 signatures and a debate in State Parliament in 2013. Transport Minister Gladys Berejiklian committed funding to a lift serving one platform. The lift opened in November 2015, serving platforms 6 and 7.

The Gibbons Street exit closed in 2018 and was replaced by a new entrance on the corner of Gibbons and Lawson Streets in November 2018.

In August 2019, further improved accessibility was proposed, including a new concourse at the southern end of the station. Construction of the Southern Concourse began in 2021 and opened in October 2023. The upgrade provided lift access to platforms 1–10, a new entrance off Little Eveleigh Street and a relocation of the existing Marian Street entrance. To enable construction of the new concourse, a heritage-listed building on Platform 1 that was originally built in 1884 was relocated.

Lift access to platforms 11–12, which are on a diverging underground alignment, has yet to be provided. Providing lift access to these platforms would potentially involve a multi-storey development.

== Description ==
Redfern has 12 platforms, with ten at ground level connected by stairs to the concourse at Lawson Street. The other two are underground, connected by stairs and escalators to the concourse at Gibbons Street. The two concourses are linked. Station offices and facilities such as toilets and the main indicator boards are located next to the Lawson Street entry.

As part of the construction of the Eastern Suburbs Railway (now platforms 11 and 12), it was proposed to build up to four platforms for the underground route. Two of these platforms were built and are now platforms 11 and 12. However, the two platforms above them were only partially constructed. Evidence of the platforms can be seen through a small gap in the wall opposite Platform 11, at a boarded-up entry portal under the Lawson Street Bridge (which was to be the down track) and at a now-filled-in dive tunnel under the Wells Street Sectioning Hut on the Central side of Lawson Street. The area in which the platforms were to be situated is visible from the station concourse at the entrance to Platform 10.

== Services ==
=== Platforms ===
Platform	Line	Stopping pattern	Notes
1	Central Coast & Newcastle Line	3 Weekday morning peak hour services to Sydney Central	
1	Blue Mountains Line	3 Weekday morning peak hour services to Central	
1	South Coast Line	Services to Sydney Central	
1	Olympic Park railway line	Special event services to Central	
2	Central Coast & Newcastle Line	3 Weekday evening peak hour services to Gosford & Newcastle via Strathfield	
2	Blue Mountains Line	2 Weekday evening peak hour services to Katoomba; 1 weekday evening peak service to Mount Victoria via Parramatta	
2	South Coast Line	Services to Wollongong, Dapto & Kiama via Wolli Creek	
2	Olympic Park railway line	Special event services to Olympic Park	
3	T1 North Shore & Western Line	Services to Lindfield, Gordon, Hornsby and Berowra via Chatswood	
3	T1 North Shore & Western Line	6 Express evening peak hour services to Central	
3	T9 Northern Line	Services to Gordon	
4	T1 North Shore & Western Line	Services to Penrith, Richmond and Emu Plains	
4	T1 North Shore & Western Line	6 Express morning peak hour services to Blacktown via Parramatta	
4	T9 Northern Line	Services to Hornsby via Strathfield	
5	T2 Leppington & Inner West Line	Services to Central and the City Circle	
5	T3 Liverpool & Inner West Line	Services to Central and the City Circle	
6	T2 Leppington & Inner West Line	Services to Homebush, Leppington and Parramatta	
6	T3 Liverpool & Inner West Line	Services to Liverpool via Regents Park	
7	T8 Airport & South Line	Services to Central and the City Circle	
8	T8 Airport & South Line	Services to Sydenham evening peak services to Macarthur via Sydenham and East Hills	
9	T8 Airport & South Line	Weekday peak hour services to Central and the City Circle commencing from Redfern	
10	T8 Airport & South Line	Terminating services from Central	
11	T4 Eastern Suburbs & Illawarra Line	Services to Bondi Junction	
11	South Coast Line	Services to Martin Place and Bondi Junction	
12	T4 Eastern Suburbs & Illawarra Line	Services to Cronulla, Waterfall and Helensburgh	
12	South Coast Line	Services to Wollongong, Dapto & Kiama via Wolli Creek	
13 and 14		Incomplete platforms situated west of Platforms 11 and 12 and behind Platform 10	

=== Transport links ===
Redfern does not have a connecting bus interchange. However, two stops along Gibbon Street close to the Gibbons Street entrance (near platforms 11 and 12) serve the following Transdev John Holland, Transit Systems and two NightRide routes:

- 305: to Mascot Stamford Hotel
- 306: to Mascot station
- 308: Marrickville Metro to Eddy Avenue
- 309: to Port Botany
- N11: Cronulla station to Town Hall station
- N20: Riverwood station to Town Hall station

There are stops further afield in Redfern Street servicing bus routes to Railway Square and in Regent Street servicing bus routes to Marrickville, Mascot and Banksmeadow.

== Heritage listing ==
Redfern Railway Station Group has heritage significance at a state level as a major suburban station which played an important role in the development of the surrounding residential and industrial suburbs. It was listed on the New South Wales State Heritage Register on 2 April 1999 as "the place is important in demonstrating the course, or pattern, of cultural or natural history in New South Wales."

The station includes a number of buildings and structures of rare architecture such as the Queen Anne style overhead booking office and the 1884 station building on Platform 1, which was relocated during the construction of the new southern concourse.

== In popular culture ==
The station appeared in the 2017 film Bad Genius.

== Gallery ==
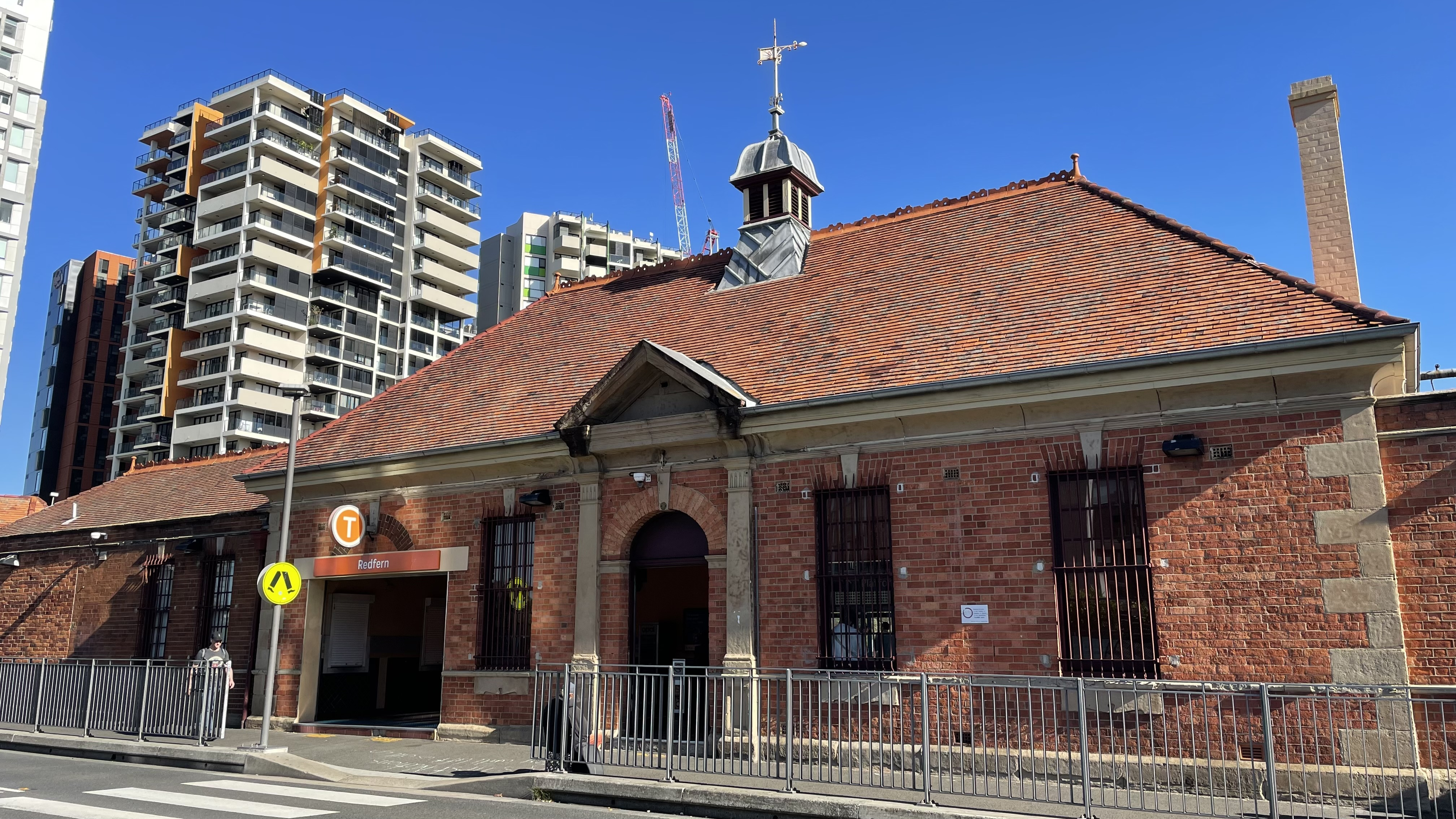
Lawson Street entrance in October 2023

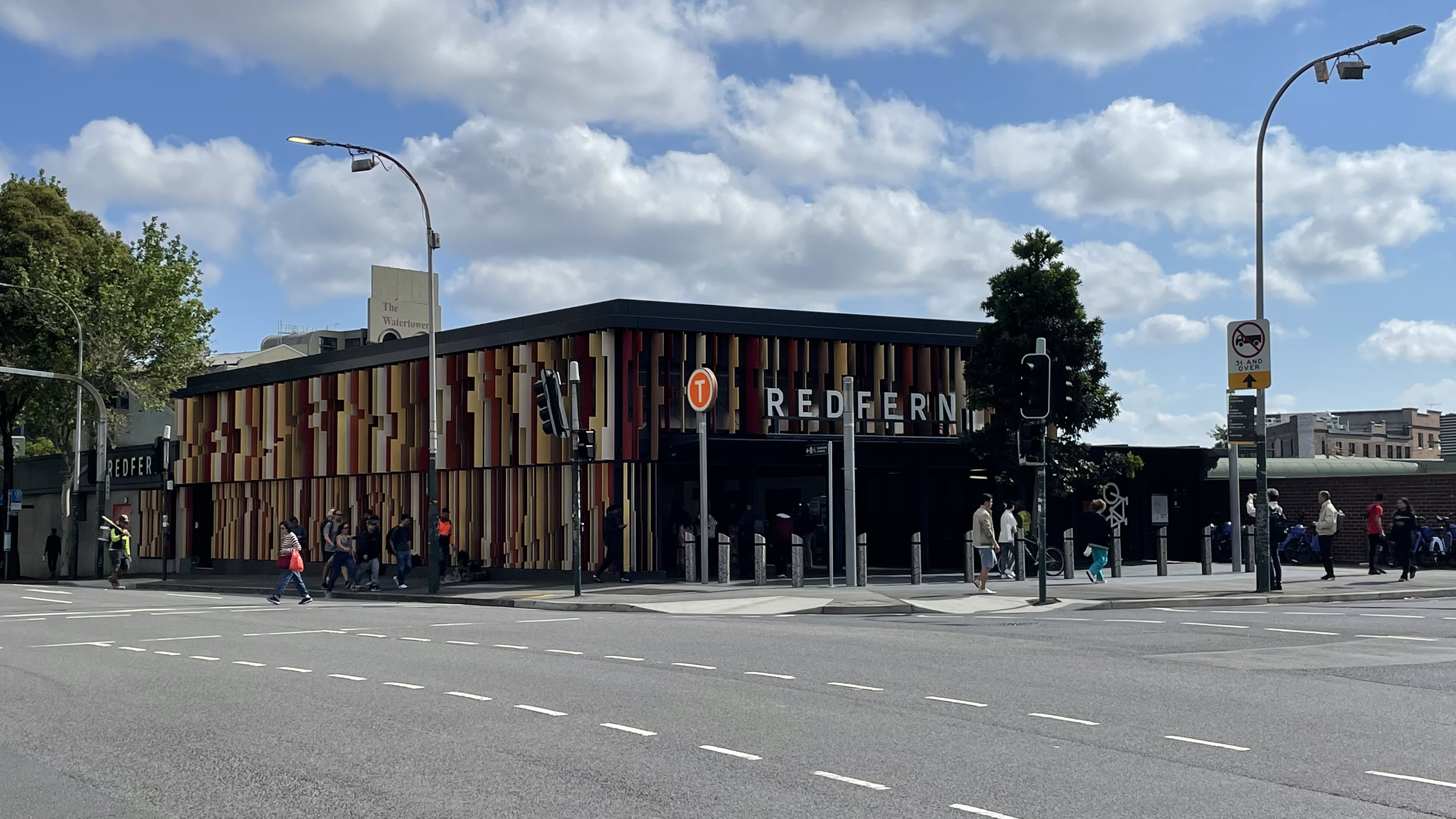
Gibbons Street entrance in October 2023

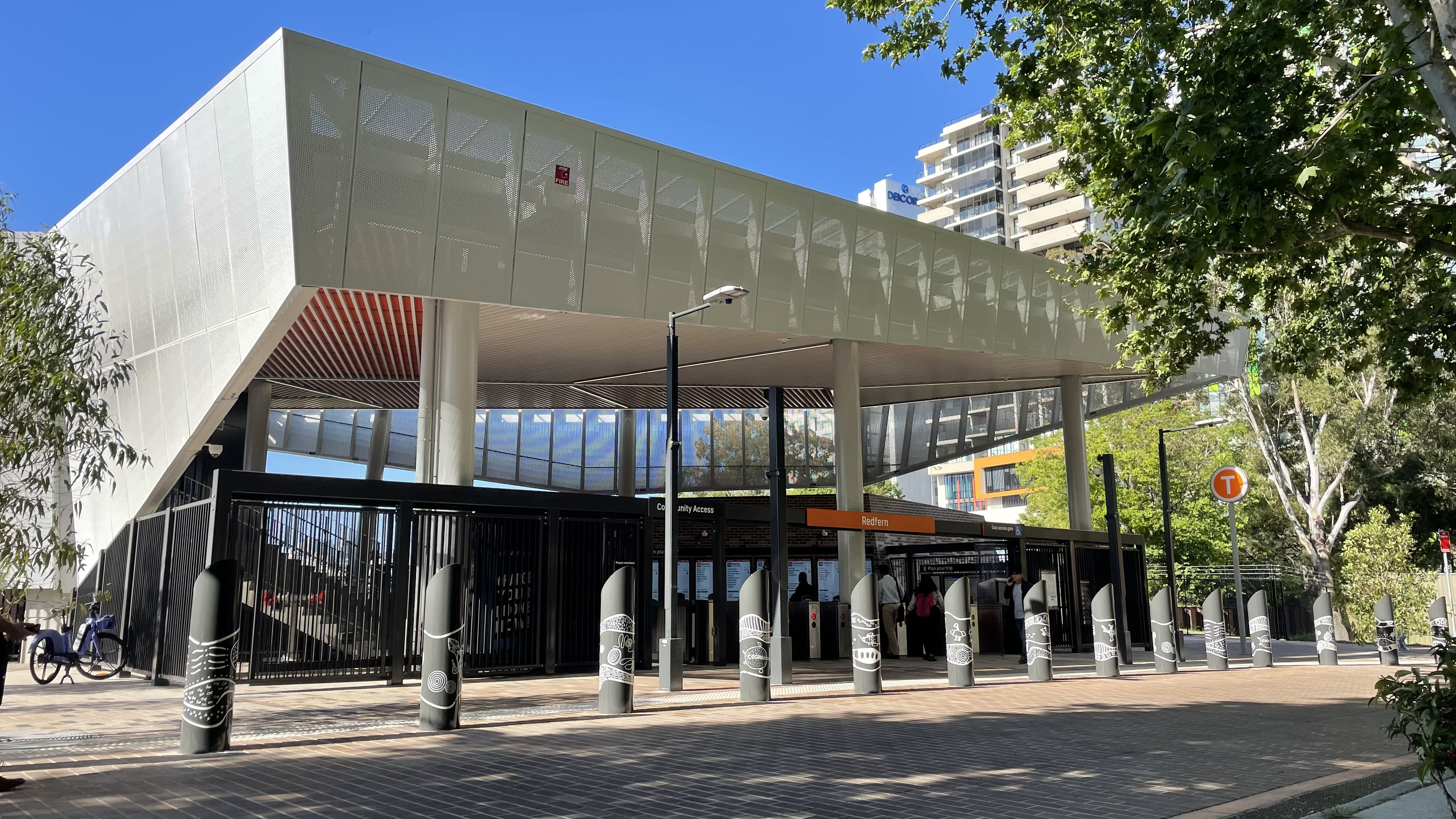
Marian Street entrance in October 2023

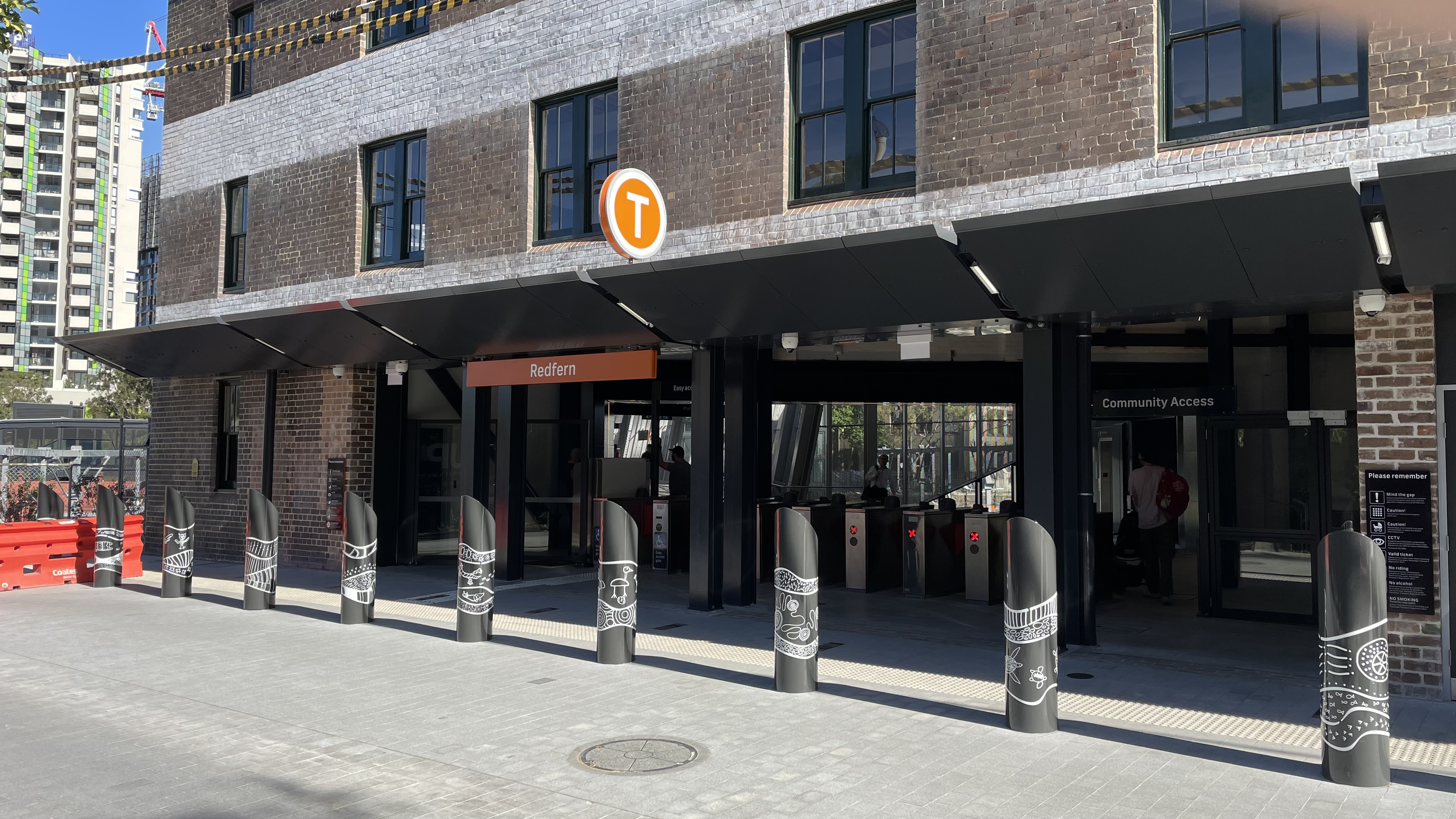
Little Eveleigh Street Entrance in October 2023

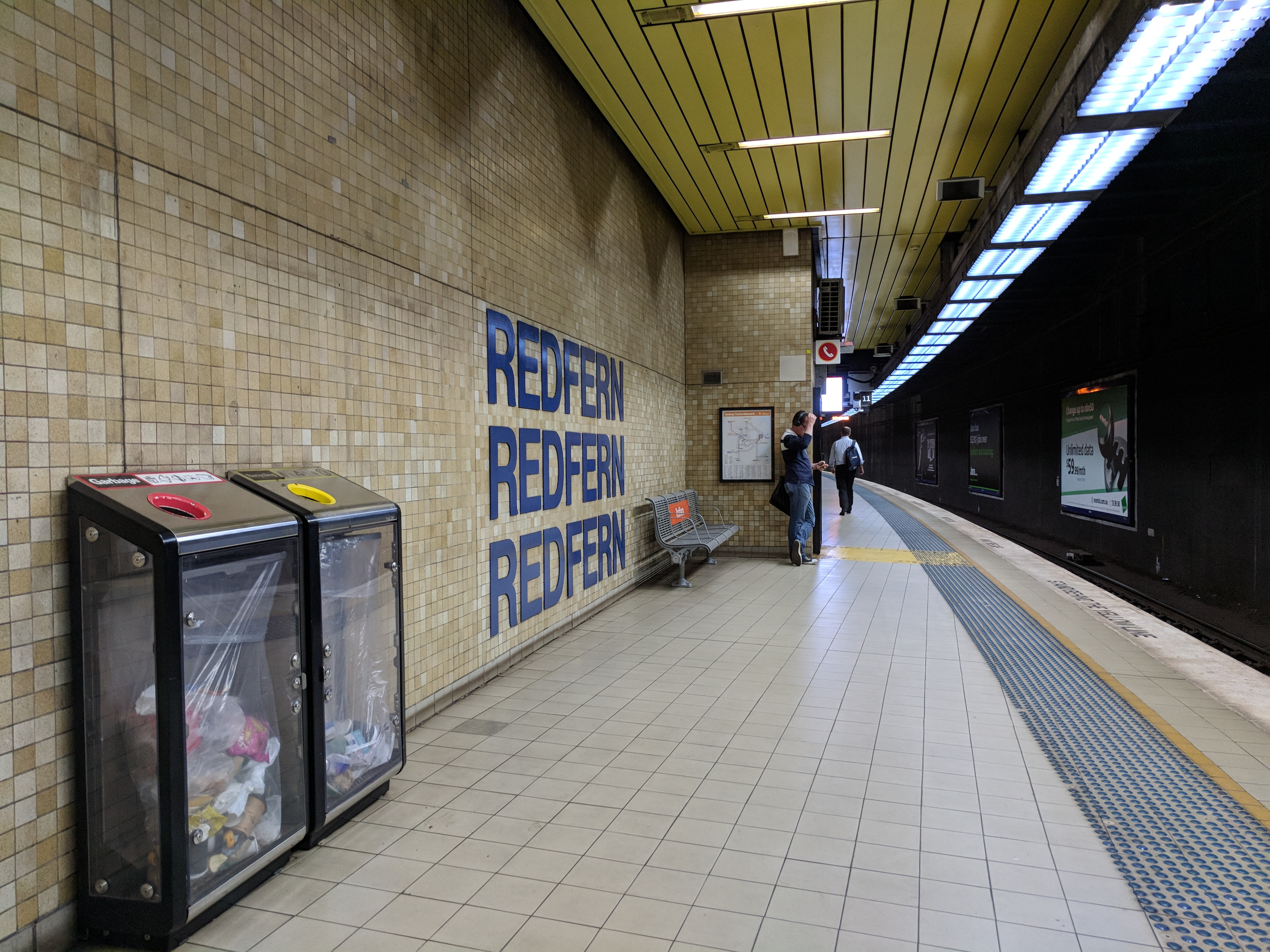
The underground platforms in April 2018

== See also ==
- List of railway stations in Sydney
