= Hurstville Central =

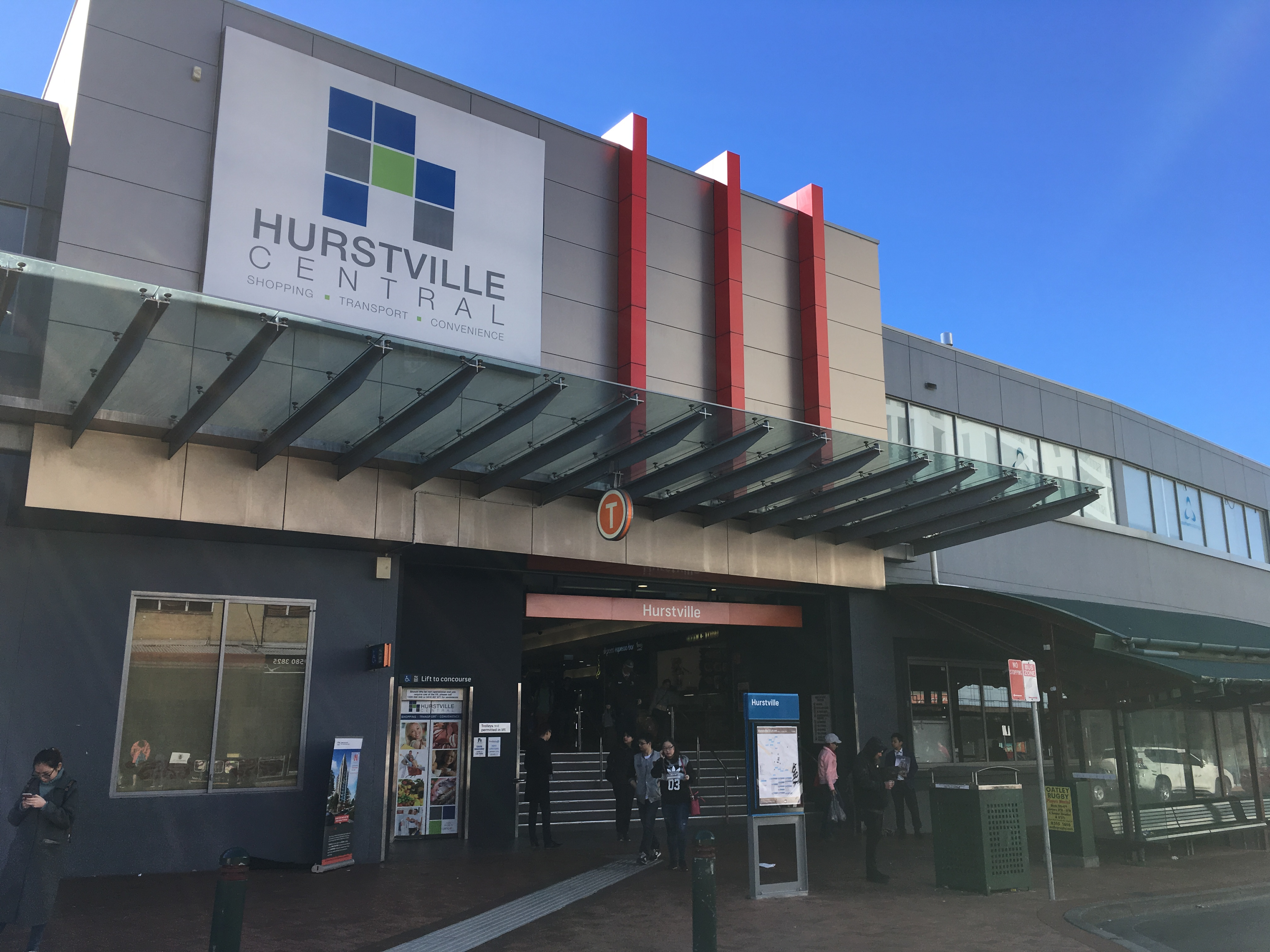
- Ormonde Parade entrance to Hurstville Central
- Location: Hurstville, New South Wales, Australia
- Coordinates: 33°58′02″S 151°06′10″E
- Address: 225 Forest Rd, Hurstville NSW 2220
- Opened: 13 September 1965; 61 years ago
- Manager: Cerno Group
- Owner: Cerno Group
- Num. of stores: 40
- Num. of anchor tenants: 1
- Floor area: 15,211 m^{2} (163,730 sq ft)
- Floors: 2
- Parking: 231
- Public transit: Hurstville railway station
- Website: hurstvillecentral.com.au

Hurstville Central (originally named Hurstville Super Centre) is a shopping centre in the suburb of Hurstville in the St George area of Sydney, Australia. It is located above Hurstville railway station and features a Coles supermarket and around 39 speciality stores.

== Transport ==
The Eastern Suburbs & Illawarra Line offer frequent train services to Hurstville station.

Hurstville Central has bus connections to the Sydney CBD, Inner West, St George, Sutherland Shire, as well as local surrounding suburbs. It is served by Transit Systems and U-Go Mobility services. Majority of its bus services located on Ormonde Parade and Forest Road in front of the centre.

Hurstville Central has an open air rooftop car park with 231 spaces.

== History ==
Hurstville railway station opened in 1884 on the terminus of the Illawarra line from Redfern. The train station was an open air type train station until Hurstville Super Centre opened in 1965.

In 1956, a cake shop owner at Wynyard railway station lodged an application with Hurstville Council to build a shopping centre above Hurstville Railway Station. The cake shop owner was inspired by the way shops sat above Wynyard's train line. So he proposed a five-storey development above Hurstville Station. Kogarah Council, which had control over the Ormonde Parade side of the train station, approved the plan. Construction started on the site in 1957 with the centre originally to be called Bowes Super Centre. The construction came to a halt by that year since the opening of the Top Ryde Shopping Centre. The plan changed to the centre to 5 storeys and then above. In 1961, the project, now known as the Hurstville Super Centre, projected a completion date of late 1962. The opening date was set to 1965 after objections with the former Hurstville Mayor Gordon Hill and the former Federal Transport Minister John McMahon.

The first stage of the centre officially opened on 13 September 1965 by NSW Premier Robert Askin with an estimated 8,000 people lined onto Forest Road and crowded into the centre. However rival centre Roselands officially opened on 13 October 1965, just a month later. Since the opening, customers were promised a lot more in the future than the fifty shops and rooftop carpark. The original plans from the early 1960s included extra parking, "Prestige" shopping level above the existing shopping centre, offices and six levels of apartments. In the 1970s there was hope that it would proceed as per original plans. However the development was never built further than stage one. With the purchase of Miranda Fair (now Westfield Miranda) by the Westfield Group and the opening of nearby Westfield Hurstville in 1987 saw the centre fall into a gradual decline. During the 1990s the centre lost many stores with many vacant store spaces left including Franklins (which had replaced Coles) closed. By the mid-2000s the centre was desolate with large areas vacant and the structure itself in a bad state. However, during this time there have been several ownership changes with the centre purchased and owned by Cerno Group.

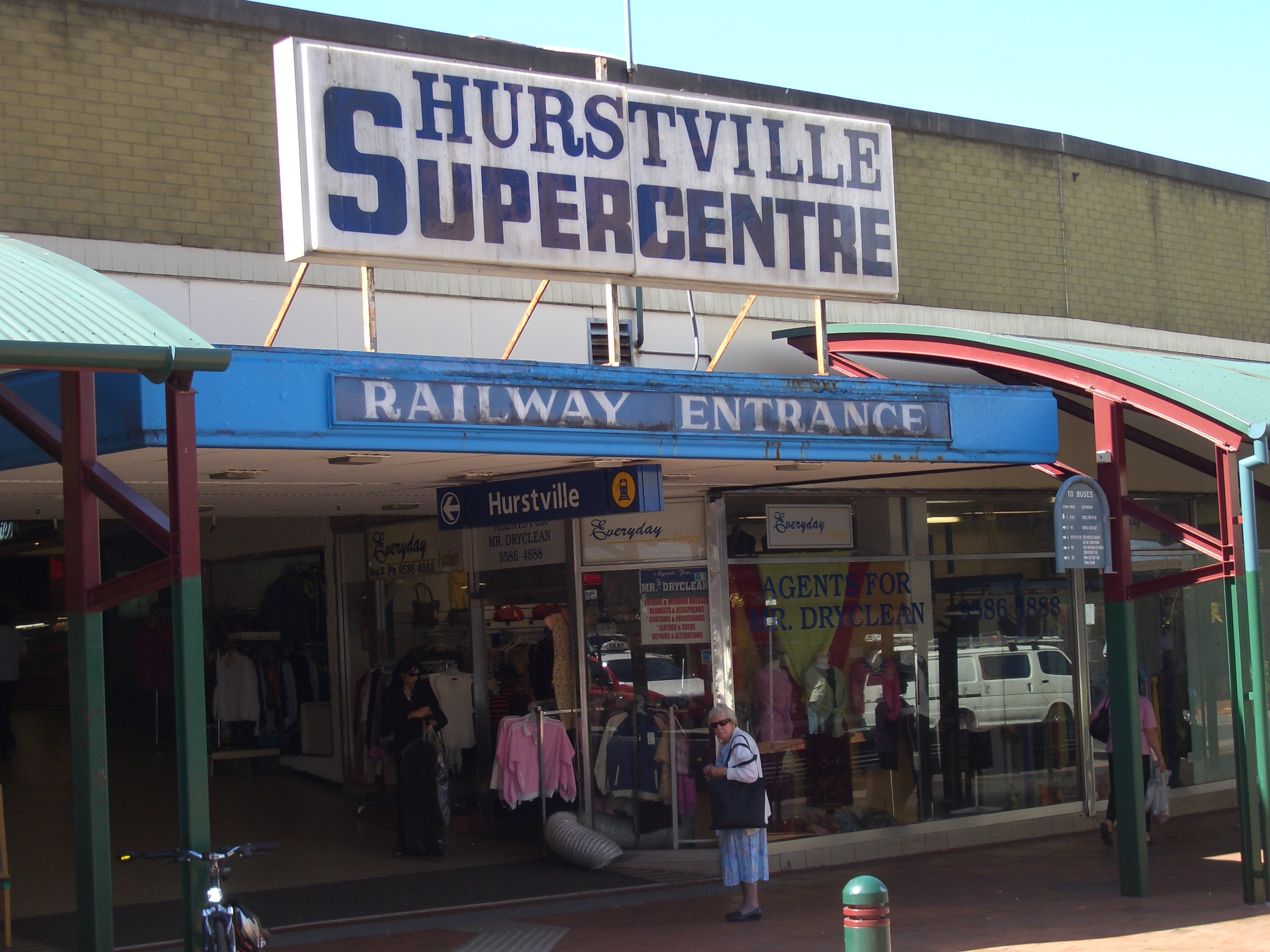
Hurstville Super Centre before it was demolished

In 2007 Hurstville Super Centre underwent a redevelopment, costing $15 million. During this refurbishment, the interior was rebuilt and included a Coles supermarket and an upgraded concourse with many new a stores as well. The redevelopment was completed in 2008 and the centre was renamed Hurstville Central.

There have previously been plans to build several residential towers above the station and the centre but these plans have been shelved over concerns about the integrity of overhead supports in the event of a derailment.
