= Allawah railway station =

Railway station in Sydney, New South Wales, Australia

Allawah
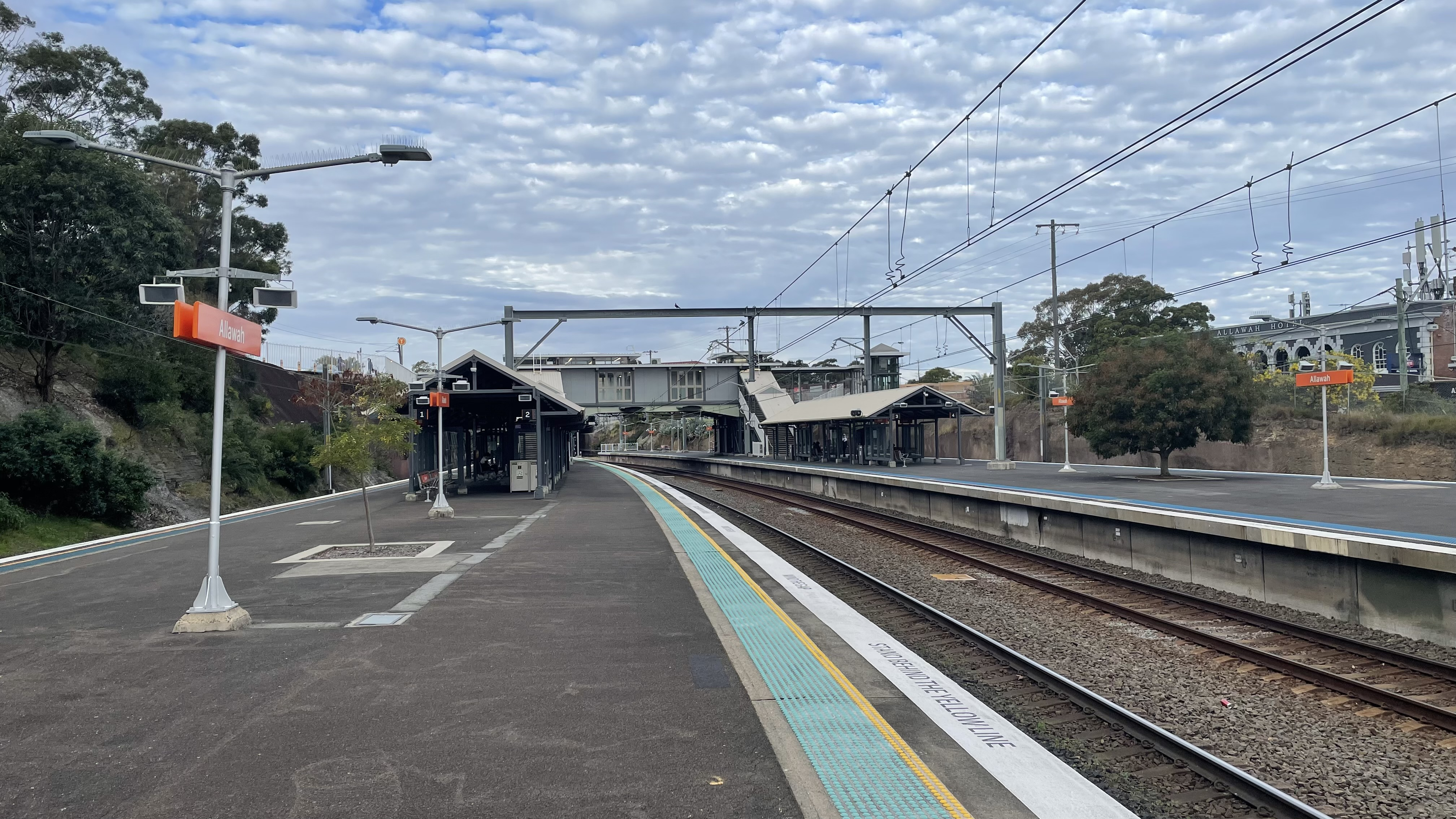
- Northbound view from Platform 3 in June 2022

General information
- Location: Railway Parade, Allawah; Sydney, New South Wales; Australia
- Coordinates: 33°58′11″S 151°06′51″E
- Elevation: 56 metres (184 ft)
- Owner: Transport Asset Manager of NSW
- Operator: Sydney Trains
- Line: South Coast
- Distance: 13.69 km (8.51 mi) from Central
- Platforms: 4 (2 island)
- Tracks: 4
- Connections: Bus

Construction
- Structure type: Ground
- Accessible: Yes

Other information
- Status: Weekdays: Staffed: 6am to 7pm: Weekends and public holidays: Staffed: 8am to 4pm
- Station code: AWH
- Website: Transport for NSW

History
- Opened: 25 October 1925 (100 years ago)
- Electrified: Yes (from 1926)
- Former names: Bellevue (during construction)

Passengers
- 2025: 1,337,158 (year); 3,663 (daily) (Sydney Trains)
- Rank: 107

Services
Preceding station	Sydney Trains	Following station
Hurstville towards Waterfall or Cronulla	Eastern Suburbs & Illawarra Line	Carlton towards Bondi Junction
Location

Allawah railway station is a suburban railway station located on the South Coast line, serving the Sydney suburb of Allawah. It is served by Sydney Trains T4 Eastern Suburbs & Illawarra Line services.

== History ==
The South Coast railway line was extended to Hurstville in 1884, though a station at Allawah was not provided at this time. Proposals for a station began as early as July 1914 when aldermen from the municipalities of Hurstville, Kogarah and Bexley suggested the construction of a platform in the area.

Construction of the station began in the early-1920s. The station was originally named Bellevue, as the suburb of Allawah was known at the time. However in June 1924, the Railway Commissioners announced that the new station would be renamed due to the existence of other stations in Australia with the same name. Three names were suggested: Robert's Hill which was the postal name of the area; Allawah, a local Aboriginal word meaning "stay here"; and Solander from the nearby Cape Solander which could be seen from the site. Allawah was chosen as the final name.

Allawah station opened on 25 October 1925, on the same date as the opening of the duplication of the South Coast line. It consists of two island platforms with an overhead concourse and ticket office at the northern end. The original brick station buildings were demolished between 1994 and 1999, being replaced by lighter passenger shelters.

In 2001, the station was upgraded with the provision of passenger lifts and a modernised concourse.

== Services ==
=== Platforms ===
Platform	Line	Stopping pattern	Notes
1	T4	services to Bondi Junction	Peak platform
2	T4	services to Hurstville	Peak platform
3	T4	services to Bondi Junction	Off-peak platform
4	T4	services to Cronulla, Waterfall & Helensburgh	Off-peak platform

=== Bus services ===
U-Go Mobility operates one bus route via Allawah station, under contract to Transport for NSW:

- 947: Kogarah station to Hurstville

Allawah railway station is served by two NightRide routes:

- N10 Sutherland station to Town Hall station
- N11 Cronulla station to Town Hall station
