= Rockdale railway station =

Railway station in Sydney, New South Wales, Australia

Rockdale
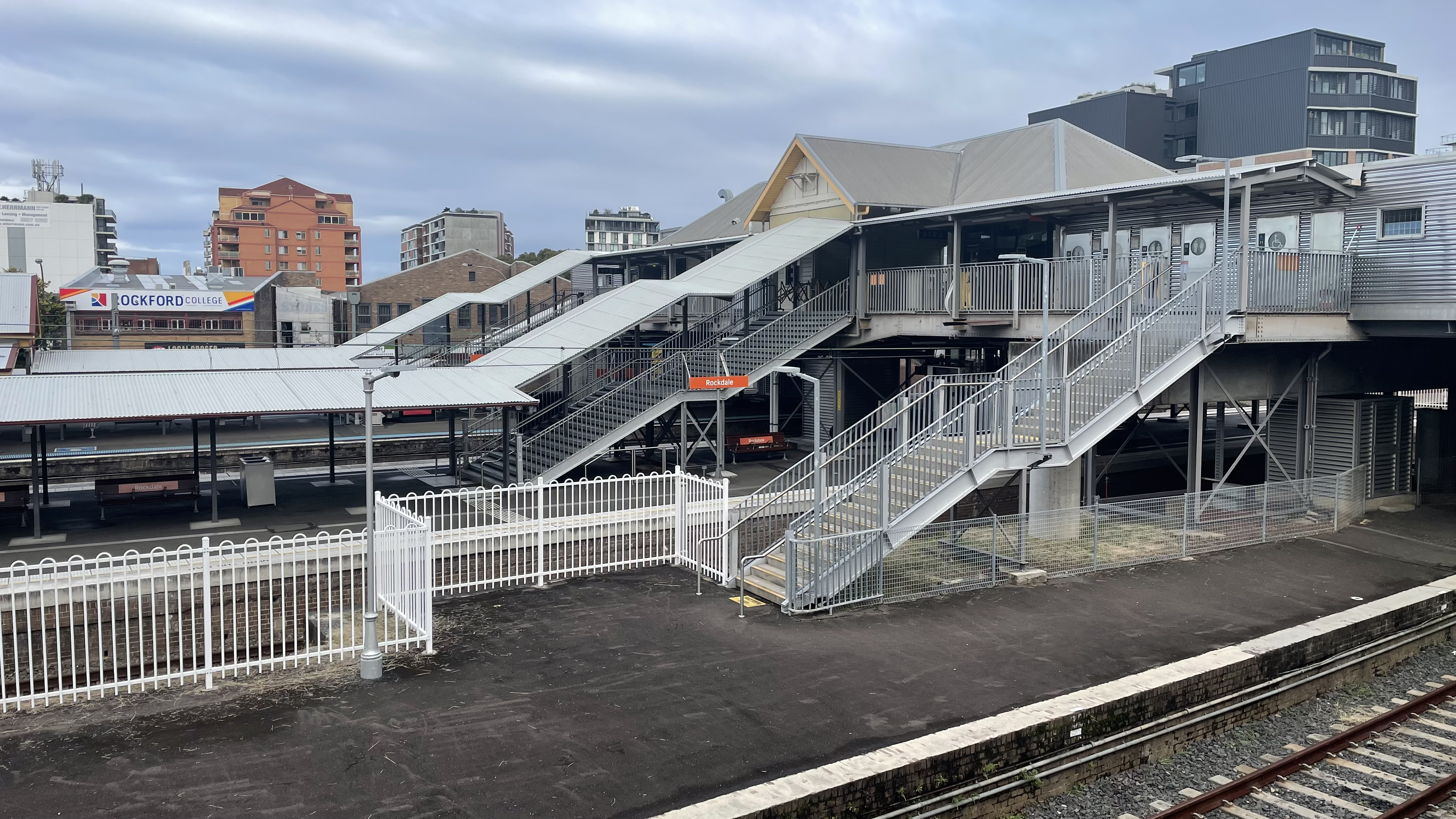
- Southeast-bound view of station concourse and platforms in July 2024

General information
- Location: Railway Street, Rockdale; Sydney, New South Wales; Australia
- Coordinates: 33°57′07″S 151°08′12″E
- Elevation: 20 metres (66 ft)
- Owner: Transport Asset Manager of NSW
- Operator: Sydney Trains
- Line: South Coast
- Distance: 10.41 km (6.47 mi) from Central
- Platforms: 5 (1 side, 2 island)
- Tracks: 5
- Connections: Bus

Construction
- Structure type: Ground
- Accessible: Yes

Other information
- Status: Staffed
- Station code: RKL
- Website: Transport for NSW

History
- Opened: 15 October 1884 (142 years ago)
- Electrified: Yes (from 1926)

Passengers
- 2025: 5,331,065 (year); 14,606 (daily) (Sydney Trains)
- Rank: 31

Services
Preceding station	Sydney Trains	Following station
Kogarah towards Waterfall or Cronulla	Eastern Suburbs & Illawarra Line	Banksia towards Bondi Junction
Kogarah towards Waterfall or Cronulla	Eastern Suburbs & Illawarra Line	Wolli Creek towards Bondi Junction
Location

Rockdale railway station is a heritage-listed suburban railway station located on the South Coast line, serving the Sydney suburb of Rockdale. It is served by Sydney Trains T4 Eastern Suburbs & Illawarra Line services. It was added to the New South Wales State Heritage Register on 2 April 1999.

== History ==
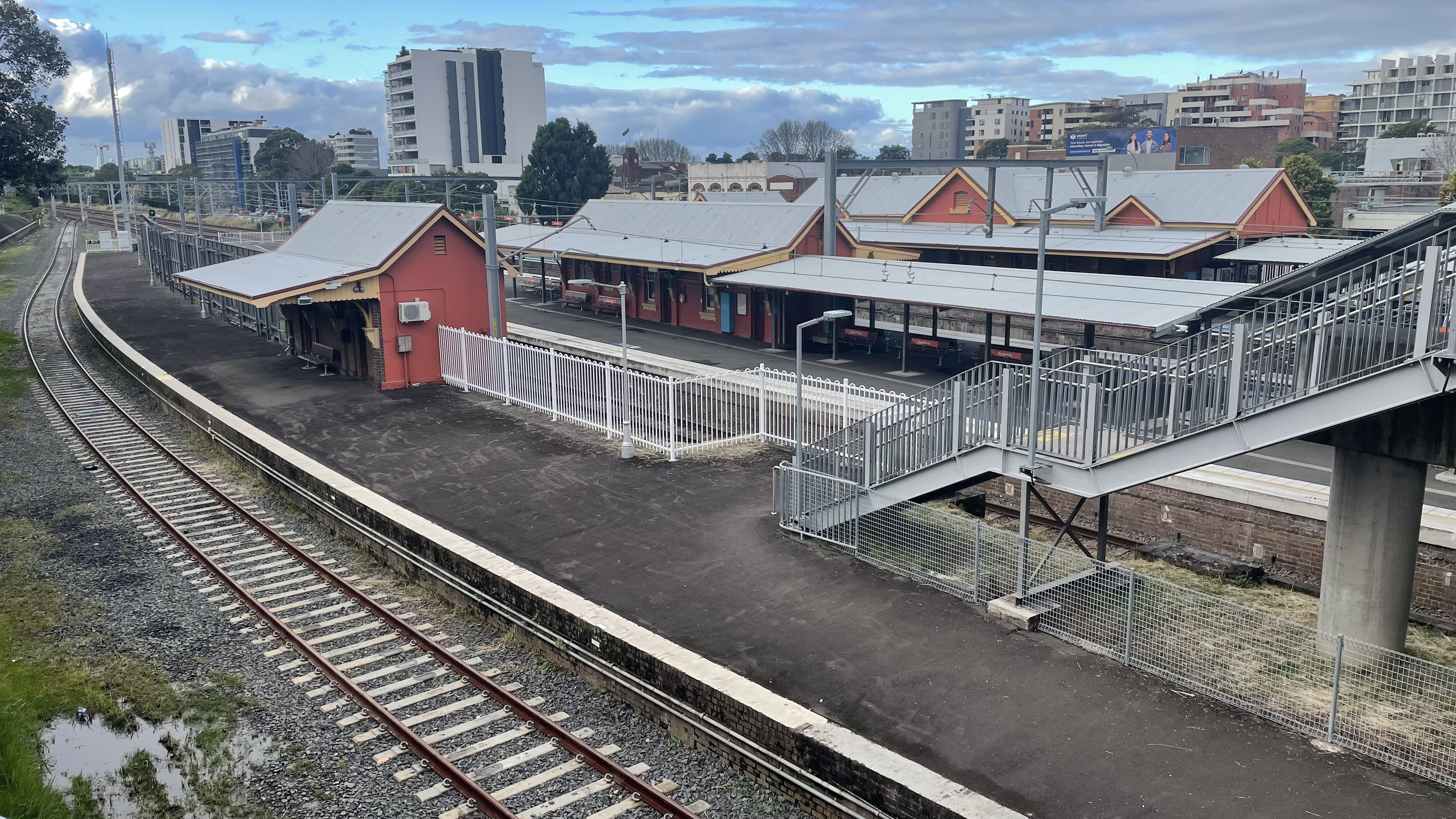
Northbound view with Platform 1 in foreground

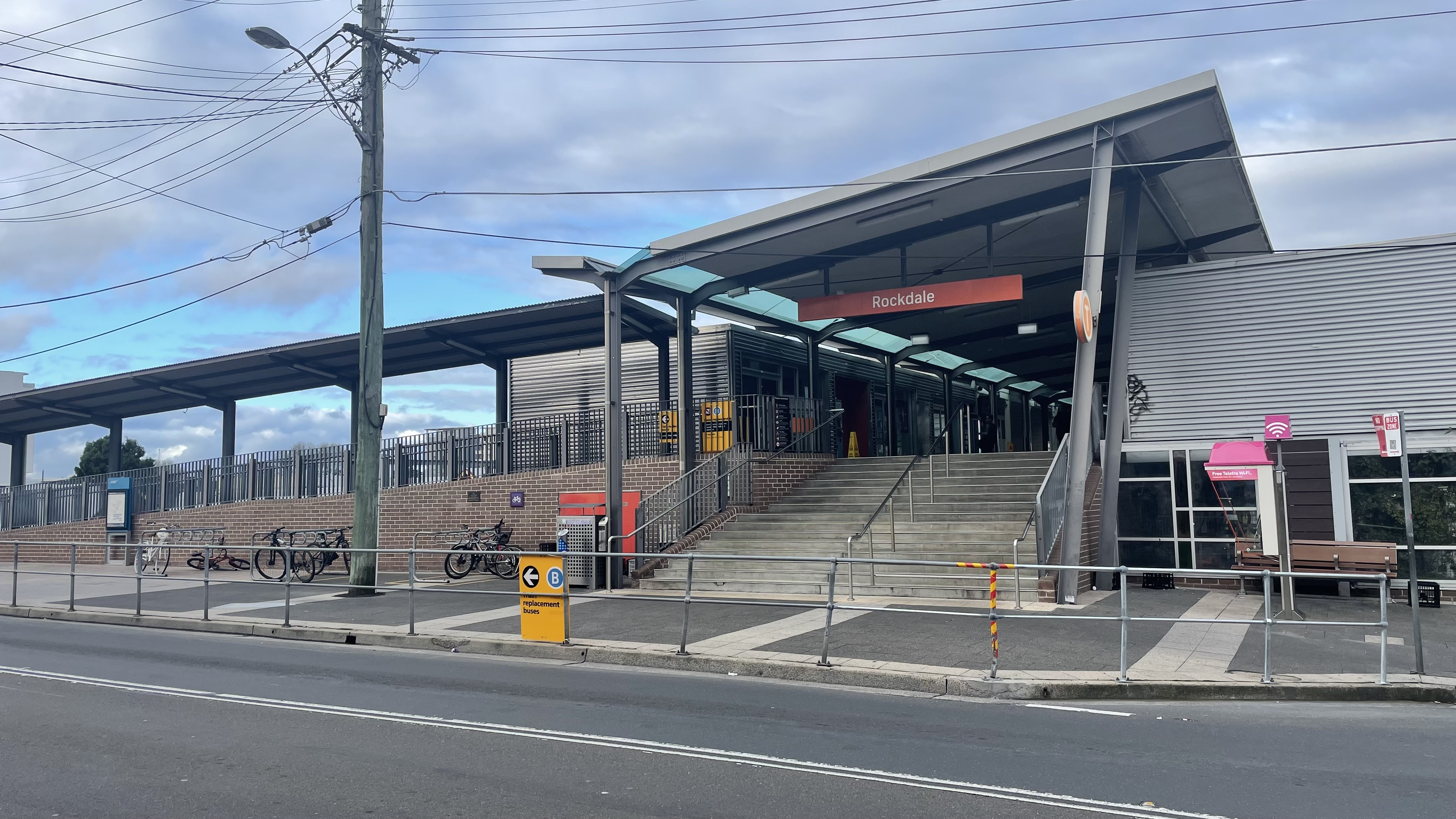
Railway Street entrance

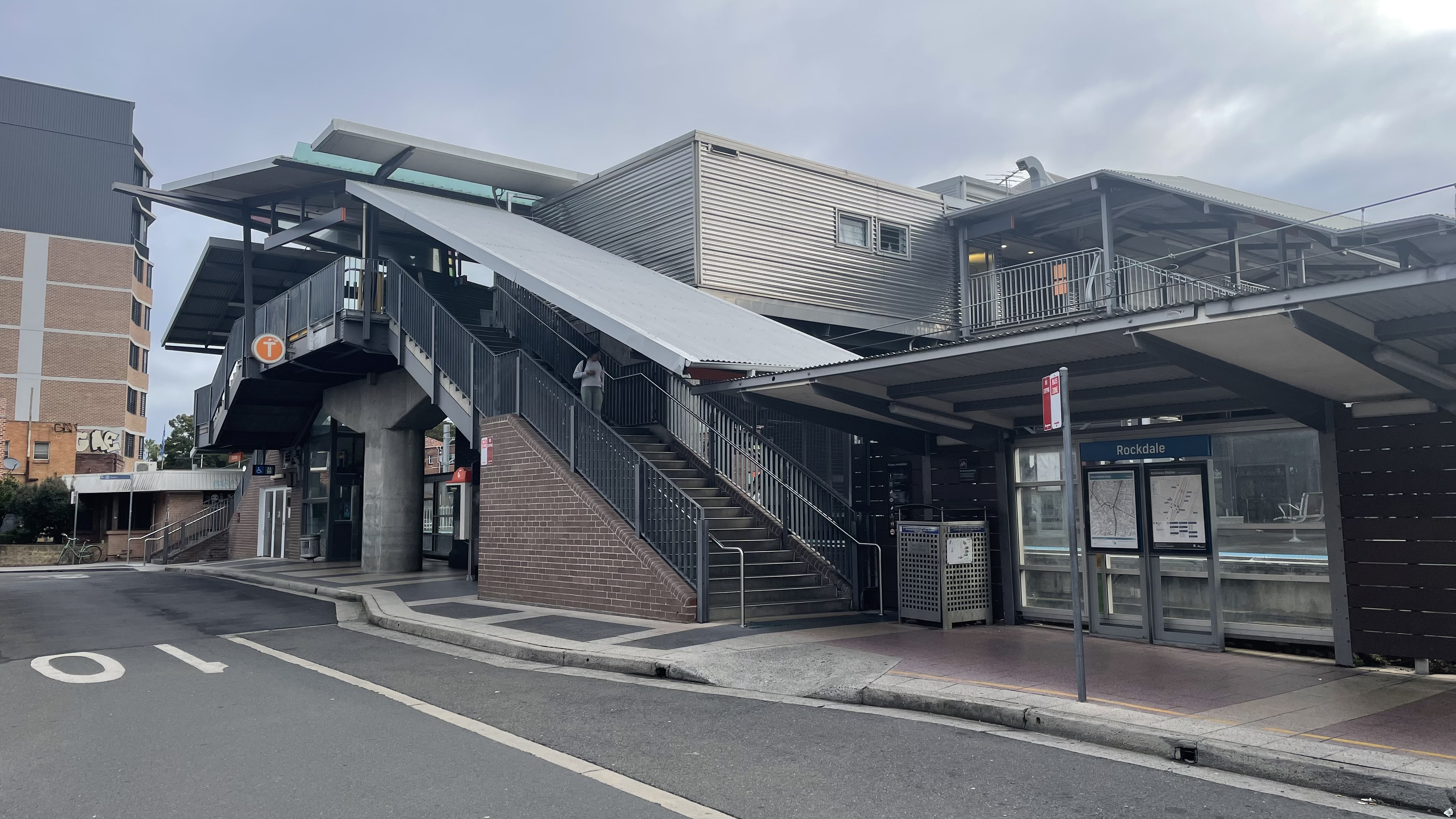
Geeves Ave entrance

Rockdale station opened on 15 October 1884 on the same date as the South Coast line from Redfern to Hurstville with two side platforms. At the opening of Rockdale Railway Station, a goods shed and siding was provided on the eastern side.

Rockdale station is unusual in that it initially provided a rail connection for coal transfer and passengers for Saywell's Private Tramway. This was originally a steam powered tramway operation, which began running from Rockdale to Brighton on Botany Bay from 1885. In 1887 another tramway service from Rockdale to Sans Souci began operation. In 1899 Thomas Saywell converted his steam trams to electricity. In 1937 the tram service from Rockdale to Sans Souci was replaced by a trolley bus service, and the tramway to Brighton closed in 1938. In the latter years of the tramway's operation, the rail connection was also used for the transfer of Departmental rolling stock to the tramways in the area.

In 1907, the northbound platform was converted to an island with a new southbound track. The former southbound track (current Platform 4) became the northbound track, with the former southbound platform (current Platform 3) becoming a refuge siding.

In 1908, Platform 3 was converted to an island platform and an additional track laid along its western face. Rockdale now had four platform numbers. In 1923, a terminus platform (current Platform 1) was erected, when the Illawarra line was quadruplicated from Wolli Creek and the level crossing at Frederick Street was replaced by a bridge.

During the 1920s a siding for the State Meat Depot was added to Rockdale Railway Station, as was the Municipal Council's siding in 1923. In 1928 a siding was added for the small companies of Carroll Lynn and finally the Warne Family Company.

In 1920 a steel footbridge from the Maitland District was re-erected, followed in 1922 by the timber overhead booking office. In 1923 quadruplication of the line was undertaken, and new platforms added for the quadruplication. The original signal box was built on the north end of Platform 2-3 but in 1923 was replaced by the present (disused) brick elevated box on the western side of the line, east of the T junction of Railway Street and Oakura Street. Also in 1923 a new Platform No. 1 with brick waiting shed was built along with another siding, both having "dead-end" sidings for carriage storage. In 1926 the lines were electrified, and the tramway link was disconnected in 1938.

There were only relatively minor changes until abolition of the goods yard in 1979.

In February 1993 Rockdale Signal Box was abolished. Its frame consisted of a combination of pistol grip and large mechanical levers, the last example in New South Wales.

In February 2003 alterations to the station to install lifts, new access stairs and additional platform and stair canopies, and canopies to the overhead footbridge and station entrance areas were complete.

The 1925 power signal box and dead-end sidings and remains of structures relating to goods sidings and tram rolling stock, are no longer extant.

== Services ==
=== Platforms ===
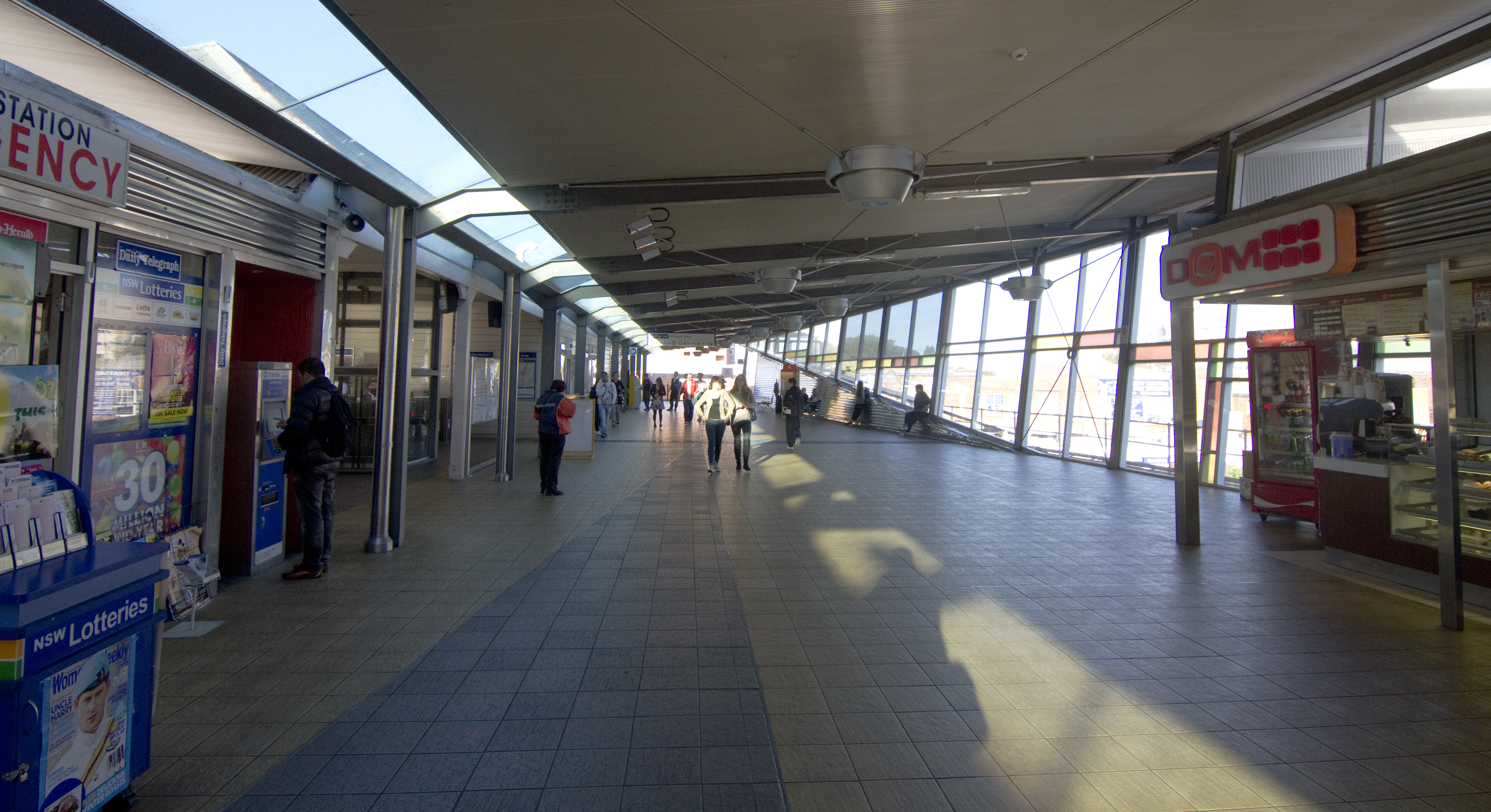
Station concourse

Platform	Line	Stopping pattern	Notes
1		No booked services	Abandoned, unelectrified dock siding used for stabling track maintenance equipment
2	Eastern Suburbs & Illawarra Line	services to Bondi Junction	Peak platform
3	Eastern Suburbs & Illawarra Line	services to Hurstville, Cronulla & Waterfall	Peak platform
4	Eastern Suburbs & Illawarra Line	services to Bondi Junction	Off-peak platform
5	Eastern Suburbs & Illawarra Line	services to Hurstville, Cronulla, Waterfall & Helensburgh	Off-peak platform

=== Transport links ===
Transit Systems operates nine bus routes via Rockdale station:

- 420: Westfield Burwood to Mascot Station via Sydney Airport
- 422: to Railway Square
- 473: to Campsie
- 476: to Dolls Point (Loop Service)
- 477: to Westfield Miranda via Sans Souci
- 478: to Westfield Miranda via Monterey
- 479: Rockdale Plaza to Brighton
- 492: to Drummoyne
- 493: to HomeCo. Roselands

U-Go Mobility operates two bus routes via Rockdale station:

- 452: to Beverly Hills station via Bexley & Hurstville
- 453: to Percival Street, Bexley

Rockdale station is served by three NightRide routes:

- N10: Sutherland station to Town Hall station
- N11: Cronulla station to Town Hall station
- N20: Riverwood station to Town Hall station

== Trackplan ==
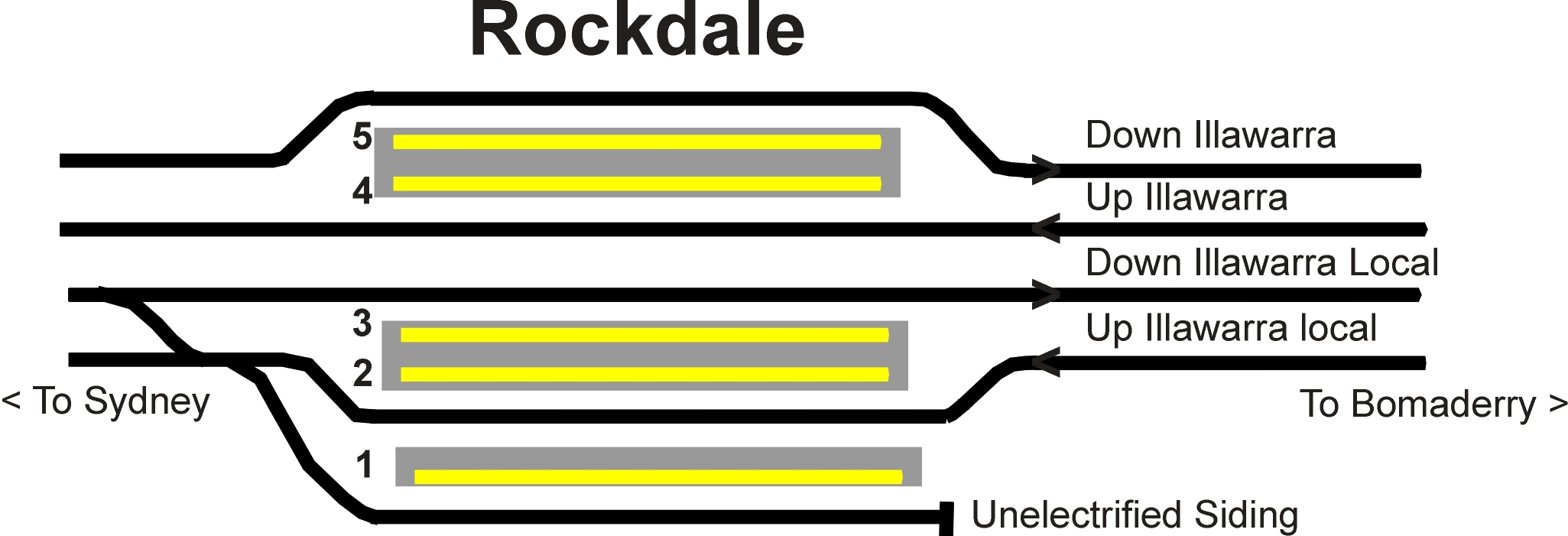
Track layout

== Description ==
The heritage-listed station precinct includes the Platform 1 building (1925), the Platform 2/3 building (1908), the Platform 4/5 building (1884), the overhead booking office (1922), the footbridge (1920), the platforms and the Signal Box (1923).

Rockdale Railway Station is located between Railway Street on the west and Geeves Avenue on the east and is accessed from both streets via a footbridge, stairs and modern lifts. The station has three island platforms. Along both Railway Street and Geeves Avenue adjacent to the station are extensive bus shelters. Adjacent and to the south of the western entry to the station (off Railway Street) is a distinctive 2-storey brick Inter-War Functionalist style retail building.

Platform 1 Building (1925)

A small brick platform building with an unpainted brick wall on the main west elevation, and painted brickwork on the other elevations. The building is built to the platform edge on the east side. The building has a gabled corrugated steel roof, with gable ends to north and south, and a cantilevered awning on the west side only. The awning is on steel brackets mounted on stucco brackets and features timber valences at each end. The building features rectangular timber louvred vents to the gable ends. There are three timber framed double hung windows covered over on the east elevation. The building's west elevation features stucco mouldings, and timber double doors with glazed upper panels. An old telephone is mounted on the west elevation, below the awning.

Platform 2/3 Building (1908)

The island platform building is a painted brick building with a gabled corrugated steel roof, with gable ends at north and south ends. There are no extant chimneys. The building has cantilevered awnings on east and west sides mounted on steel brackets in turn mounted on stucco wall brackets. The building has timber framed double hung windows with 16-pane top sashes with multicoloured glazing and timber 4 panel doors. There are moulded stucco sills to windows. The awnings have timber valances at north and south ends. There is one 8-paned fanlight above a timber 4 panel door which appears original.

The interior features timber tongue and grooved, and later gyprock ceilings, and a chimney breast to one room.

Platform 4/5 Building (1884)

The island Platform 4/5 building has painted brick walls. The building has a complex gabled corrugated steel clad roof form with two central gables, gables at north and south ends, and pairs of gablets near the north and south ends. There are no extant chimneys. The building features arched openings; one pair of original timber panelled double doors; narrow, tall, timber framed double hung windows and timber 4-panel doors with most fanlights covered over. The building features painted sandstone sills to windows. Both east and west sides of the building have skillion corrugated steel roofed awnings on cast iron posts with cast iron friezes and brackets.

Detached Building on Platform 4/5

At the northern end of the platform is a separate small painted brick detached wing with a gabled roof (with the roof ridge in a transverse direction to the main roof ridge of the platform building), with gable ends to east and west. The roof is corrugated steel. The building features timber framed double hung windows. There is a modern awning structure wrapping around the north and west sides of the building. The asphalt platform surface is raised from the original height and partially covers some building vents. There are modern steel security screens to windows and doors.

The Station Managers' office in the Platform 4/5 building (which appears to be converted from a waiting room) has an original fanlight with two vertical glazing bars, an original plaster ceiling with plaster ceiling rose, and an original chimney breast (though no fireplace).

Overhead Booking Office (1922)

A weatherboard building with a hipped corrugated steel roof with a large gable facing Platform 2/3 to the north. The building features, timber framed double hung windows with 9 paned top sashes featuring multicoloured glazing. A modern awning cuts across the top of the top sashes of the windows on the north side of the building.

Footbridge (1920)

Steel, two sets of taper-haunched girders, one set for street access, the other for platform interchange. The footbridge is located towards the southern end of the platforms. The steel footbridge structure, steps, step railings and posts with star pattern detail, are original, manufactured by Dorman Long & Co., however modern railings have been added to the footbridge. The footbridge supports the weatherboard overhead booking office (1920), and modern corrugated steel clad entry buildings and lifts have been constructed at east and west ends.

Platforms (1884-1925)

Three island platforms, all with asphalt surfaces and brick faces. Platform 1 abuts the rail tracks on the east side, and has white powder coated aluminium fencing preventing access on the east side.

Platform Canopies (2005)

Various modern platform canopies with steel posts with concrete bases and green corrugated Colorbond gabled roofs. Platform 2/3: A platform canopy structure leads from the platform entry stairs at the southern end of the platform to the platform building. There is also a platform canopy north of the platform building. Platform 4/5: A platform canopy leads from the platform entry stairs at the southern end to the main platform building. There is also a platform canopy wrapping around the north and west sides of the separate small building at the northern end of the platform.

Signal Box (1923)

Two storey signal box with brick ground floor and fibro walls to 1st floor, hipped corrugated steel roof. Windows are timber-framed. Two metal stairs give access to a deck along the west elevation.

Landscape/Natural Features

Shrub and tree plantings at northern end of platforms.

Moveable Items

Old telephone attached to west wall of Platform 1 building.

=== Condition ===
The buildings on platforms 1, 2/3 and 4/5, the overhead booking office, the platforms and the 1920 footbridge have been reported to be in good condition, while the signal box is in moderate condition.

The platform buildings are relatively intact externally. Original internal features are extant to Platform 2/3 and 4/5 buildings. The overhead booking office is one of the more intact such structures on the Illawarra line.

== Heritage listing ==
Rockdale Railway Station – including Platforms 1-5 and all platform buildings, footbridge, overhead booking office and signal box – is of State heritage significance. The collection of station structures at Rockdale is considered to be of State significance as a very intact collection dating from 1887, including one of the most intact of five extant 1887 3rd class brick platform buildings on the Illawarra line (Platform 4/5 building) and a rare platform building built for a tramway.

Rockdale Railway Station is of historical significance as an important station on the Illawarra line developed from 1884 as a major transport hub to the Rockdale area. The development of the station has included the construction of Platform 1 to service trams (which ceased operation in 1938). The Platform 1 building and platform are of historical significance as structures which demonstrate the role of Rockdale Railway Station from 1885 to 1938 in connecting trains with steam (and later electric) trams.

The 1884 Platform 4/5 building is of historical significance as one of only five extant 3rd class platform buildings on the Illawarra Line. The platform buildings, overhead booking office, footbridge and stairs and signal box are of aesthetic significance as good representative examples of railway architecture and railway structures of their respective periods. The 1925 Platform 1 building, built to connect to a tram service, is very rare.

Rockdale railway station was listed on the New South Wales State Heritage Register on 2 April 1999 having satisfied the following criteria.

The place is important in demonstrating the course, or pattern, of cultural or natural history in New South Wales.

Rockdale Railway Station is of State historical significance as an important station on the Illawarra line developed from 1884, which demonstrates its development over time from 1884 to the present. The development of the station has included the construction of a platform and platform building on Platform 1 to service trams (which ceased operation in 1938). The Platform 1 building and platform are of historical significance as structures which demonstrate the role of Rockdale Railway Station from 1885 to 1938 in connecting trains with steam (and later electric) trams. The 1884 Platform 4/5 building is of historical significance as one of a few 3rd class station buildings on the Illawarra Line (other examples at St Peters and Sydenham). The Platform 1 building and platform are of historical significance as structures which demonstrate the role of Rockdale Railway Station from 1885 to 1938 in connecting trains with steam (and later electric) trams. The station as a whole is of historical significance for its role as a major transport hub for the Rockdale region since 1884.

The place is important in demonstrating aesthetic characteristics and/or a high degree of creative or technical achievement in New South Wales.

The platform buildings are of aesthetic significance as good examples of railway architecture of their respective types and periods. The 1884 3rd class Platform 4/5 building with separate toilet block is a fine example of late Victorian railway architecture with some Victorian Rustic Gothic and Victorian Filigree style influences, including an elaborate gabled roof form and awnings on elaborate cast iron posts. The 1908 Platform 2/3 building, and the 1925 Platform 1 buildings are fine representative examples of brick platform buildings from the early decades of the 20th century with Federation Queen Anne and Victorian Italianate style influences, and typical features of this type of railway structure such as simple gabled roofs and cantilevered awnings.

The place has strong or special association with a particular community or cultural group in New South Wales for social, cultural or spiritual reasons.

The place has the potential to contribute to the local community's sense of place, and can provide a connection to the local community's past.

The place possesses uncommon, rare or endangered aspects of the cultural or natural history of New South Wales.

The 1884 Platform 4/5 3rd class building is rare, being one of five examples on the Illawarra line (other examples at Carlton, St Peters, Sydenham and Wollongong railway stations). The Platform 1 building, built for a tram service, is a rare feature of this locality (only other example on the Illawarra line of a tramway building associated with a railway station is at Sutherland railway station).

The place is important in demonstrating the principal characteristics of a class of cultural or natural places/environments in New South Wales.

The platform buildings as a whole, the overhead booking office and footbridge, and signal box are representative of standard railway station buildings and structures of their respective types and periods.
