= CLJ =

CLJ may refer to:

- Commander of the medieval Military and Hospitaller Order of Saint Lazarus of Jerusalem (Malta)
- Commander of the modern Order of Saint Lazarus (statuted 1910)
- The IATA code for Cluj-Napoca International Airport, Romania
- The National Rail code for Clapham Junction railway station, London, England
- The code for Carlton railway station, Sydney, Australia
- Hewlett-Packard Color LaserJet printers
- The Constitutional Loya Jirga held in Afghanistan in 2003
- The Cambridge Law Journal
- The Current Law Journal (Malaysia)
- The Clojure programming language
- Caleb Landry Jones
