= Jubilee Stadium =

Stadium in Carlton, New South Wales, Australia

- Jubilee Stadium in August 2018
- Interactive map of Jubilee Stadium
- Full name: St.George Venues Jubilee Stadium
- Address: 249 Princes Highway; Kogarah; Australia
- Location: Sydney, Australia
- Coordinates: 33°58′19″S 151°7′45″E
- Owner: Georges River Council
- Operator: Georges River Council
- Capacity: 20,500
- Surface: Grass
- Record attendance: 23,582 – St George vs South Sydney, 1975
- Public transit: Carlton

Construction
- Opened: 1936

Tenants
- St. George Illawarra Dragons (NRL) (1999, 2003–2007, 2009–present); St. George Dragons (NSWRL/ARL/NRL) (1936, 1950–1985, 1989–1998); Sydney Olympic FC (NSL/Australian Championship) (2003–2004) (2025–present); Sydney FC (A-League) (2018–2022, 2025); Cronulla-Sutherland Sharks (NRL) (2020–2021)

Website
- http://www.jubileestadium.com.au

Jubilee Stadium is a stadium located in Carlton, a suburb of the St. George region of Sydney, New South Wales, Australia.. It is primarily used for rugby league as a home ground of the St. George Illawarra Dragons in the National Rugby League (NRL).

The ground opened in 1936, and has since undergone numerous renovations and redevelopments to bring it to its current capacity of 20,500 spectators. The stadium primarily hosts rugby league, but has also hosted soccer, hosting Sydney FC and Sydney Olympic FC many times. The stadium is owned and operated by Georges River Council, where it is located.

== History ==
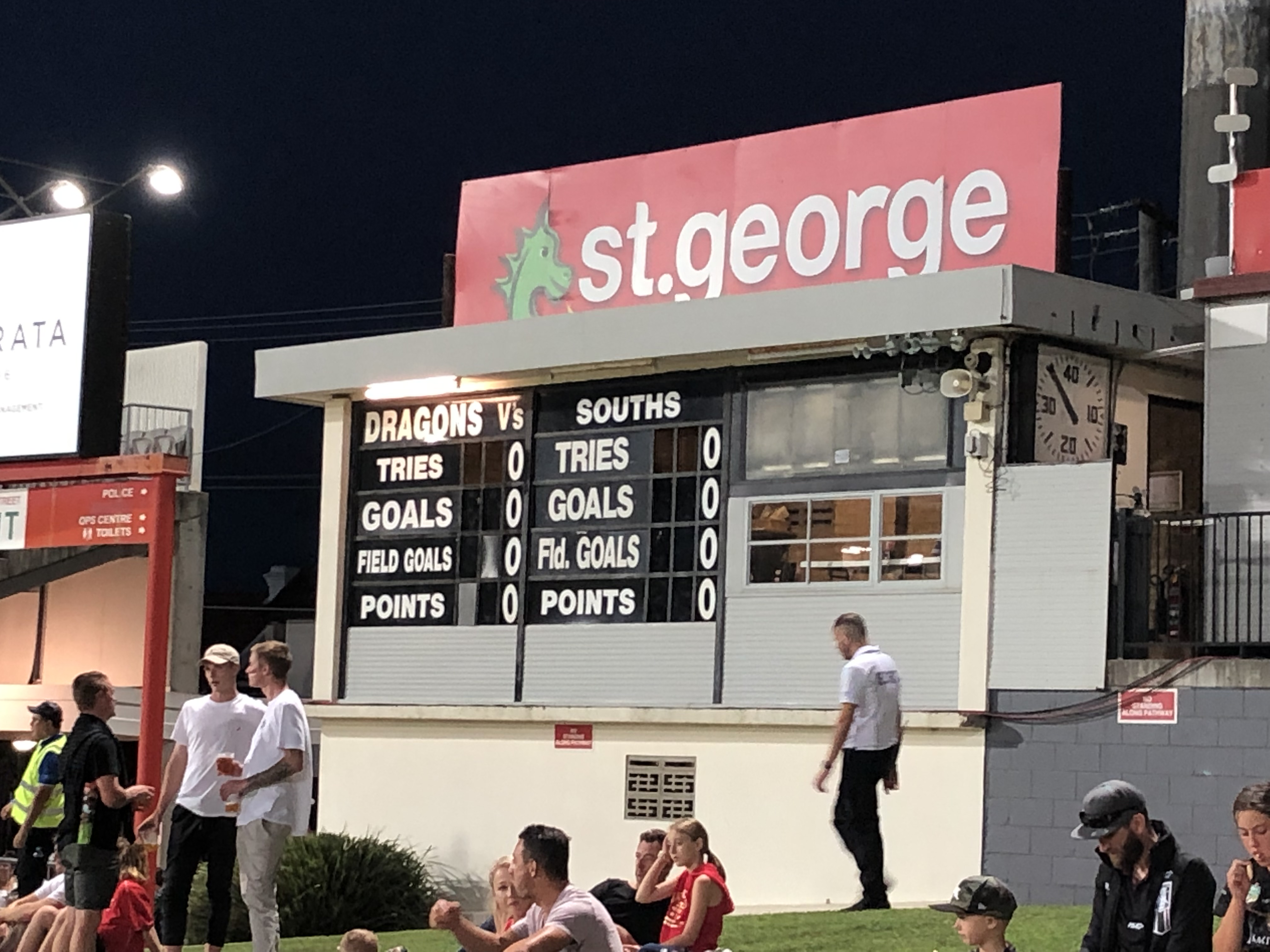
A view of the scoreboard at the north-eastern corner of the ground.

Jubilee Stadium stands on part of the original grant of 87 acres (35 ha) awarded on 23 December 1853 to Archibald McNab. Edmund English purchased the grant on 23 May 1854 for around 400 pounds. It officially became known as Kogarah Park when it was acquired by the Department of Lands on 1 July 1896 and dedicated as the first public park in Kogarah. Control of the park was eventually passed to the Council of the Municipality of Kogarah on 29 August 1906, which became Kogarah City and on 12 May 2016 Georges River Council.

During Kogarah's Jubilee celebrations in 1935, Jubilee Oval was constructed in Kogarah Park.

== Development ==
The ground was closed from 1986 until the end of 1988 because of the construction of the new grandstand being built on the western side of the ground. During this time the Dragons played their home games at the Sydney Cricket Ground in 1986 and 1987, while using Belmore Oval, the home of the Canterbury-Bankstown Bulldogs, in 1988.

Since 2003, Jubilee Stadium has been steadily upgraded in a three-stage plan, funded by the NSW State Government and Federal Government. In 2006, the ground had been updated with new features to the seating around the grandstand and features directly out of the stadium including re-developments to the Hall of Fame walk and Kogarah Park in front of the stadium. Stage 1 consisted of new terraced seating at the north-western end, perimeter seating at the base of the hill, and a regrassed and raised hill area. Floodlights for televising night matches were also installed.

In 2007, the Dragons announced that they would not be playing home games at Kogarah for the 2008 season so that Stage 2 redevelopment of the ground could be completed with new roofed extension on the southern side of the main grandstand, increasing capacity by around 2000, and further upgrading to the hill area, including turnstile facilities and strengthening the retaining wall at the Southern Jubilee Avenue end. The Dragons returned for 2009 against the Sharks in round 3, and broke the club record for highest crowd at the ground.

In 2010, the Dragons secured $13m from the NSW State Government to complete the Stage 3 Northern grandstand extension, with an additional 1580 seats and the replacement of 1730 seats in the existing main grandstand. Also included in the development are additional public toilets and facilities, refurbishment of the existing grandstand facilities including the team change rooms, a new passenger and service lift, additional corporate and multi purpose facilities, and a museum and merchandise store.

A new digital scoreboard, turnstiles and ticketing facilities at Gate B and a rainwater harvesting tank were also installed around the ground during 2010 and 2011.

== Walk of Fame ==
In March 2004, a Legends Walk outside Jubilee Stadium was opened, with 16 club greats inducted into the walk of fame: • Brian `Poppa` Clay • Mark Coyne • Reg Gasnier • Ken Kearney • Johnny King • Graeme Langlands • Eddie Lumsden • Matt McCoy • Noel Pidding • Norm Provan • John Raper • Rod `Rocket` Reddy • Kevin Ryan • Billy Smith • Ian Walsh • and Craig Young

2007 inductees: • Robert Stone • Billy Wilson

2021 inductees: • Ben Creagh • Ben Hornby • Jason Nightingale • 1921 St George Inaugural Team

== Naming rights ==
From 1950 until 2003, the ground was simply known as Jubilee Oval.

In 2003, printing and data communications company OKI signed a five-year sponsorship deal for naming rights to the ground with the name becoming OKI Jubilee Stadium. In October, 2008, OKI decided not to renew the naming rights of Jubilee Oval, as the Dragons played at ANZ Stadium during the 2008 season due to re-developments at Jubilee. The naming rights ended on 31 October with the park reverting to its former name. It was officially announced on 25 December 2008, that WIN Corporation had bought the naming rights for Jubilee Oval. With this agreement, WIN owned the naming rights to both of St. George Illawarra's home grounds, WIN Jubilee Oval and WIN Stadium. In early 2014, WIN backed out of this sponsorship, with the ground once again reverting to its original name. From 2016, the University of Wollongong held the rights to the ground for a two-year period, ending in late 2017. The ground was known as "UOW Jubilee Oval". In 2019, Netstrata, a local strata company, Netstrata, began its naming rights of the ground - becoming Nestrata Jubilee Stadium. This deal was in effect until 27 March 2025. And was renamed Jubilee Stadium since.

- Jubilee Oval (1950–2003, 2008, 2014–2015, 2018)
- OKI Jubilee Stadium (2003–2008)
- WIN Jubilee Oval (2009–2013)
- UOW Jubilee Oval (2016–2017)
- Netstrata Jubilee Stadium (2019–2025)
- Jubilee Stadium (2025)
- St.George Venues Jubilee Stadium (2026-Present)

The ground is sometimes referred to as "Kogarah Oval" by the media and fans. This helps to distinguish the stadium from the small suburban cricket ground located in Glebe, New South Wales, which is called Jubilee Oval.

== Uses ==
=== Rugby league ===
==== St. George DRLFC ====
The St. George DRLFC which commenced competing in Sydney's top level in the 1921 NSWRFL season, had an unsuccessful debut game at Jubilee Oval in 1936 when they were defeated by Newtown in an exhibition match as part of the Jubilee celebrations. The gate-takings from the match were donated to the St. George Hospital. Saints at this stage were still based at Arncliffe's Earl Park and it wasn't until 1950 that Saints returned home to Jubilee Stadium.

The Dragons played their first official match at the ground on 22 April 1950 against the South Sydney Rabbitohs before 12,500 fans. The Dragons lost a match 17–15 but defeat is a rare sight for the Dragons in the following decades while at Kogarah.

St. George were based at Kogarah during their world record breaking 11 successive premierships from 1956 to 1966. They set a record at Kogarah and were not beaten at home for an astonishing twelve years: originally beaten by the Balmain Tigers on 26 June 1954 at Kogarah which was just before the beginning of the streak. It wasn't until 31 July 1966, that they tasted defeat at Kogarah again, eventually losing 12–9 to the Western Suburbs Magpies.

In 1950, the Dragons began a permanent association with the ground. Around this time was also when St. George legend Norm Provan joined the club and he said of Kogarah:

The qualities of the club from Kogarah are not easy for me to put into words... Saints are special. I will certainly never forget my years at Kogarah, and at the club across the Princes Highway. At St.George I found qualities that enriched my life – friendship, unswerving loyalty, fair play and healthy ambition, the learning to win, and to lose.

The team was based at Jubilee Stadium right up until the completion of the 1985 season. They then chose to abandon the ground and relocated to the Sydney Cricket Ground. The decision was one which they would come to dread. In 1985 St. George had been Club champions, 1st Grade Minor premiers, 1st Grade Runners-up, Reserve Grade Premiers and Under-23s Premiers. In 1986, Saints missed the semi-finals in all 3 grades for the first time in 50 years.

In 1988, the opportunity came for the club to relocate again. Instead of moving back to Jubilee they decided to move to Belmore Oval. Finally, in 1988 it was decided that the Saints would move home to Jubilee in 1989 with a new stand to be constructed for the 1990 season.

The club yet again moved in the late 1990s and explained to fans the decision was on the basis that Jubilee was too small to accommodate a proposed $30 million stadium complex to meet NRL requirements for playing venues. In a joint statement, Kogarah Council and St. George DRLFC stated that the scale of the proposed 20,000-seat stadium would exceed the size of Jubilee Oval and affect residents. The decision to leave Jubilee upset many of St George Illawarra's loyal supporters as the ground had so much history to it and in July 2000 many supporters held a rally in support of the ground. In March 2002, the R2K (Return to Kogarah) group held a successful Information Night at the Kogarah RSL to support a return to Jubilee Oval and successfully lobbied for the Dragons to play matches at Kogarah from 2003 onwards.

==== St George Illawarra Dragons ====
The St George Illawarra Dragons, formed as the result of a merger between St George and the Illawarra Steelers in 1999, use Kogarah as one of their home grounds in the National Rugby League, along with the Steelers former home, WIN Stadium in Wollongong. The newly formed Dragons used Kogarah in the 1999 NRL season, before moving their games to the Sydney Football Stadium (SFS) in 2000.

From 2000 until 2002, after many loyal Dragons supporters held a rally and Information Night to persuade the club to move back to Jubilee Stadium (while at the SFS, the team had continued using WIN Stadium), the club did so and would be yet again occupying the famous rugby league ground. During these 3 years that the Dragons did not play at Kogarah, there were talks with the club that they would play at the nearby St George Soccer Stadium, but plans fell through and the soccer stadium has since fallen into disrepair. The Dragons returned to Kogarah in 2003 after a high number of protests and rallies held by supporter group R2K (or Return to Kogarah).

Lights were installed at Kogarah in 2006, with the Dragons christening their first night game at the ground with an 8–1 win over the Parramatta Eels in Round 13 of the 2006 season. The game was played in driving rain, which many gave as the reason for a crowd of only 9,075 in attendance.

The club did not play at the ground in 2008 because of renovations of the south-western end grandstand being built. During this time, the Dragons played at ANZ Stadium. They returned to Kogarah in 2009, where they have remained ever since.

=== Association Football ===
Sydney Olympic FC played at Jubilee Stadium in their 2003/2004 season, competing in the National Soccer League. In the years since the club have played on rare occasions at Jubilee instead of their usual Belmore Sports Ground home.

In 2014 the St George Saints were promoted to the NSW Premier League and moved to this ground as their home stadium for one season, later on moving to the nearby Bicentennial Park South development.

The Socceroos have held several open training sessions at this ground since 2013.

On 4 December 2011, it marked the first time an A-League club played a first grade competition game at the venue, with Sydney FC playing Brisbane Roar FC, in front of a crowd of 11,555. Sydney won 2–0, ending the Roar's Australian league record for undefeated matches in a row at 36 matches.

Sydney FC used this ground as their primary home venue for the 2018–19 A-League, as their usual home ground, the Sydney Football Stadium, was demolished and a new stadium built on its site. The fan base showed great support for this – having a sellout 19,081 attend their first home match there, against Melbourne Victory on 25 November 2018. They continued to use it, along with Leichhardt Oval, in the 2019–20 A-League season. Sydney FC Women also use the stadium having started to play there during the W-League 2013/2014 season. Sydney FC also hosted an Australia Cup match, defeating Macarthur FC 2-0 on the 8th of December 2021.

== Transport ==
Carlton railway station is located a few hundred metres from the ground.

== Attendance record ==
The ground record attendance for Jubilee Stadium was set in May 1975 when St. George took on South Sydney in front of 23,582 fans. In its modern form, the record attendance is 20,847 when the Dragons took on local rivals the Cronulla-Sutherland Sharks in March 2009.

The record soccer match attendance was on 25 November, 2018, when Sydney FC took on Melbourne Victory in the A-League in front of a crowd of 19,081.
