= Kogarah railway station =

Railway station in Sydney, New South Wales, Australia

Kogarah
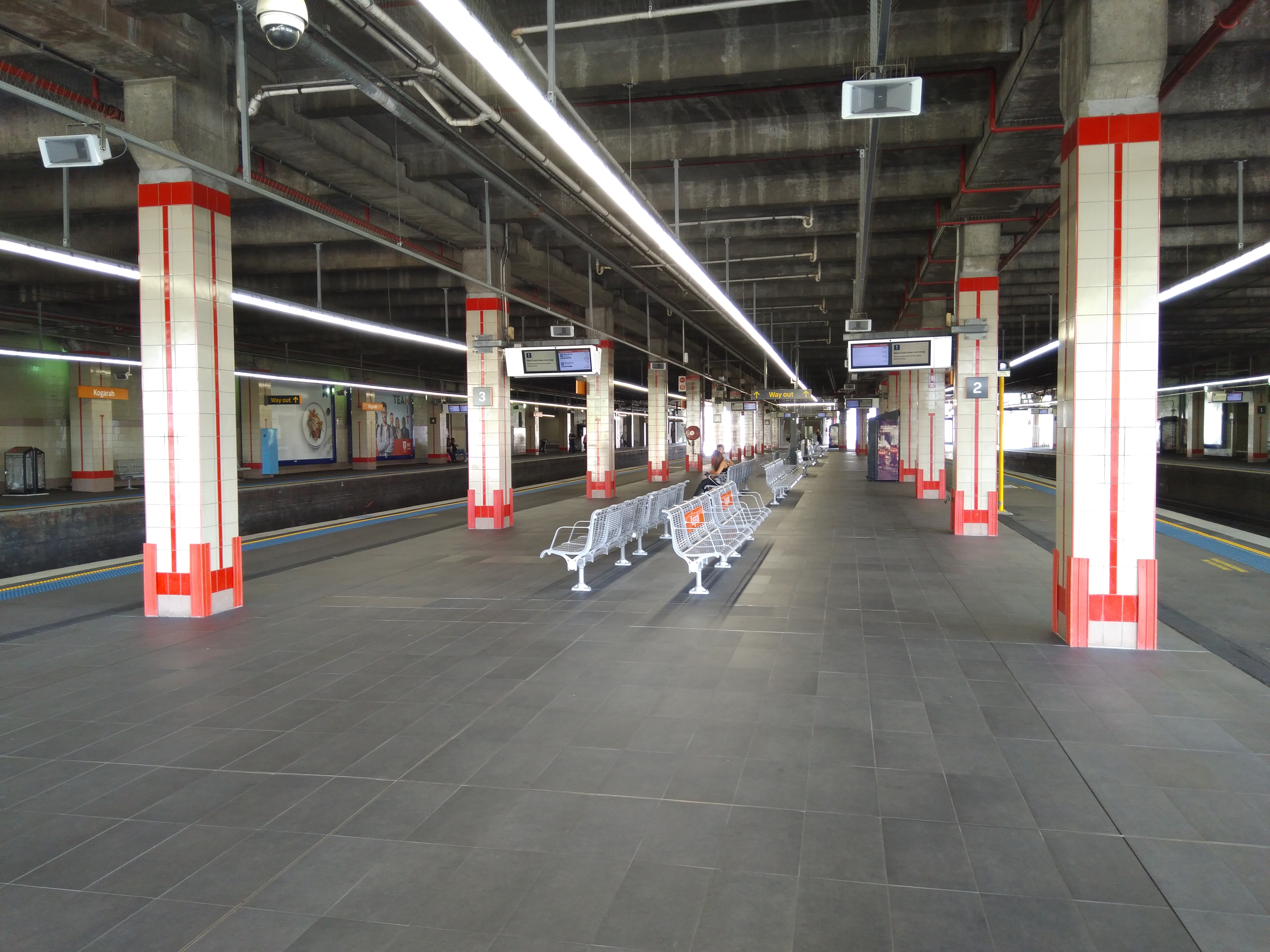
- Northbound view from Platform 2 in January 2018

General information
- Location: Railway Parade, Kogarah; Sydney, New South Wales; Australia
- Coordinates: 33°57′44″S 151°07′57″E
- Elevation: 27 metres (89 ft)
- Owner: Transport Asset Manager of NSW
- Operator: Sydney Trains
- Line: South Coast
- Distance: 11.61 km (7.21 mi) from Central
- Platforms: 4 (2 side, 1 island)
- Tracks: 4
- Connections: Bus

Construction
- Structure type: Ground; Built over
- Accessible: Yes

Other information
- Status: Staffed
- Station code: KGH
- Website: Transport for NSW

History
- Opened: 15 October 1884 (141 years ago)
- Electrified: Yes (from 1926)

Passengers
- 2025: 5,616,037 (year); 15,386 (daily) (Sydney Trains)
- Rank: 29

Services
Preceding station	Sydney Trains	Following station
Carlton towards Waterfall or Cronulla	Eastern Suburbs & Illawarra Line	Rockdale towards Bondi Junction
Hurstville towards Waterfall or Cronulla	Eastern Suburbs & Illawarra Line	Rockdale towards Bondi Junction
Location

Kogarah railway station is a suburban railway station located on the South Coast line, serving the Sydney suburb of Kogarah. It is served by Sydney Trains T4 Eastern Suburbs & Illawarra Line services.

== History ==
Kogarah station opened on 15 October 1884 on the same date as the South Coast line from Redfern to Hurstville with two side platforms.

The station received an upgraded concourse at the southern end of the station, with lifts provided prior to 1998. A multi-story commuter car park was constructed shortly after prior to 2002.

The station concourse links directly to a small shopping mall called Kogarah Town Centre, which has been built directly over the railway platforms and beside them on Railway Parade.

== Services ==
=== Platforms ===
Platform	Line	Stopping pattern	Notes
1	T4	services to Bondi Junction	Peak platform
2	T4	services to Hurstville	Peak platform
3	T4	services to Bondi Junction	Off-peak platform
4	T4	services to Cronulla, Waterfall & Helensburgh	Off-peak platform

=== Transport links ===
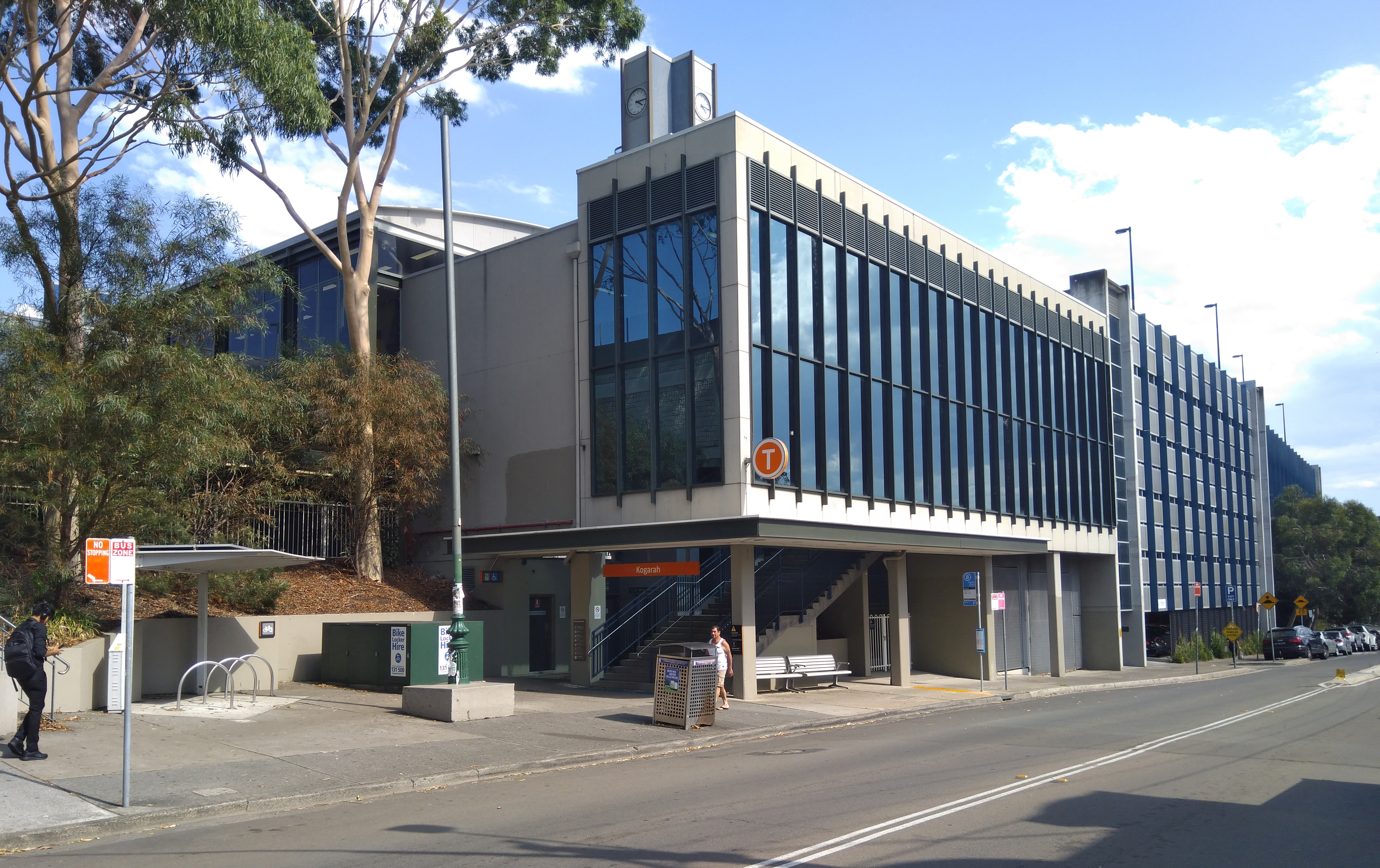
Entrance and adjacent bus stop

Transit Systems operates three bus routes via Kogarah station:

- 422: to Railway Square
- 476: Rockdale station to Dolls Point via Sans Souci
- 477: Rockdale station to Westfield Miranda via Sans Souci

U-Go Mobility operates four bus routes via Kogarah station:

- 446: to HomeCo. Roselands
- 455: Rockdale Plaza to Kingsgrove
- 947: to Hurstville
- 958: Rockdale Plaza to Hurstville

Kogarah station is served by two NightRide routes:

- N10: Sutherland station to Town Hall station
- N11: Cronulla station to Town Hall station

== Trackplan ==
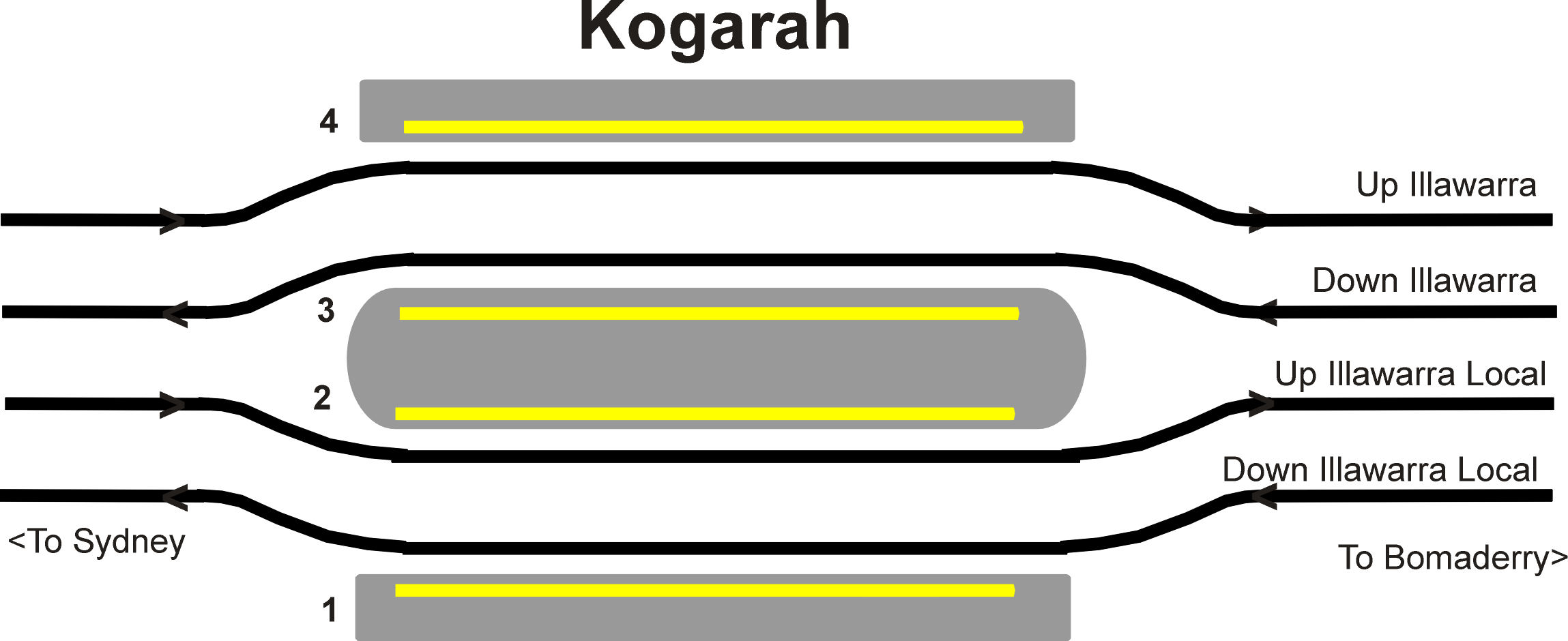
Kogarah track layout
