= Westfield Hurstville =

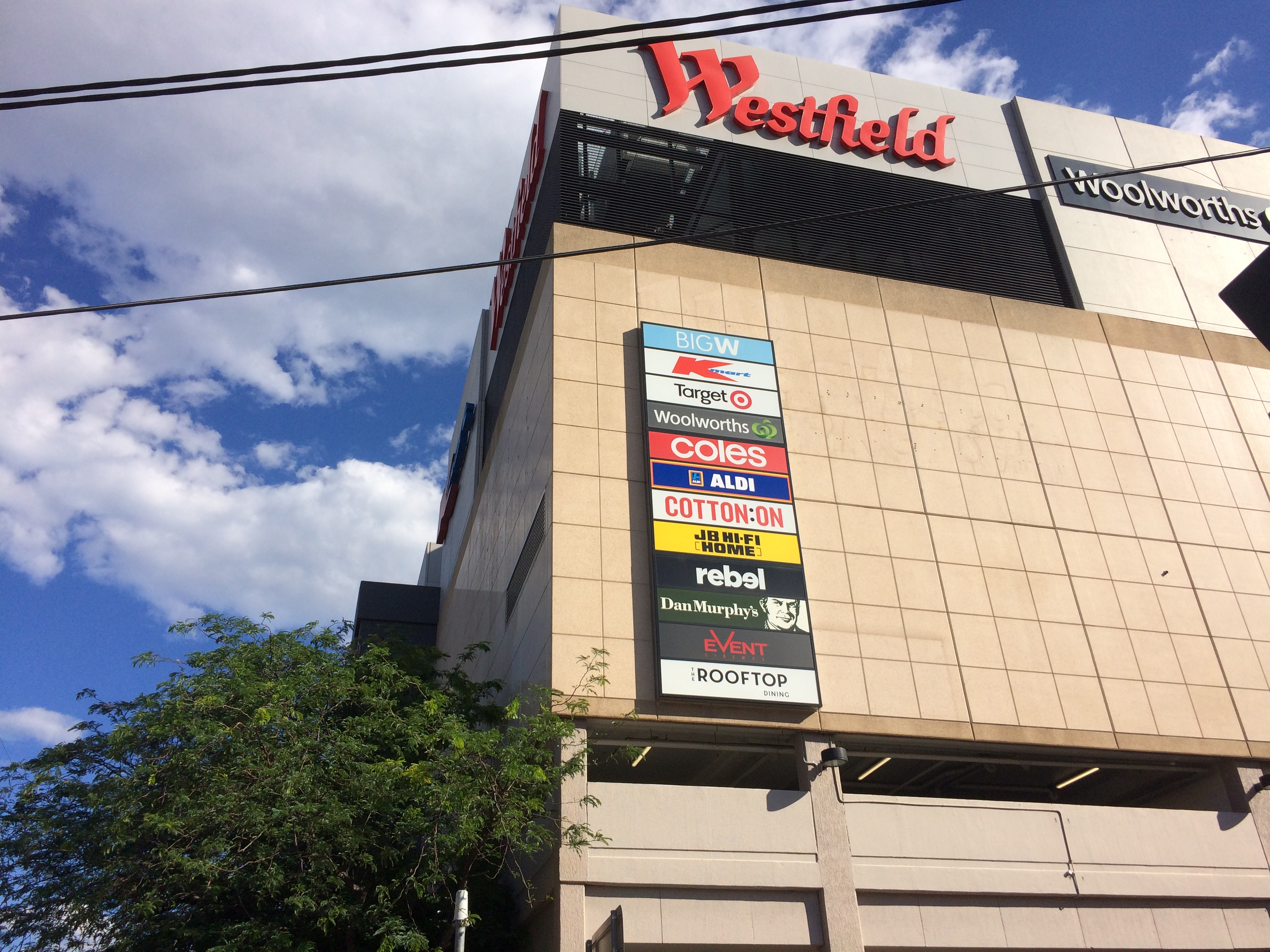
- Westfield Hurstville in November 2018
- Location: Hurstville, New South Wales, Australia
- Coordinates: 33°57′58″S 151°06′18″E
- Address: 157 Park Road
- Opened: 9 October 1978
- Manager: Scentre Group
- Owner: Scentre Group (50%); Dexus Wholesale Property Fund) (50%)
- Num. of stores: 250
- Num. of anchor tenants: 7
- Floor area: 61,231 m^{2} (659,085 sq ft)
- Floors: 7
- Parking: 2,745
- Public transit: Hurstville railway station
- Website: www.westfield.com.au/hurstville

Westfield Hurstville is a shopping centre in the suburb of Hurstville in the St George area of Sydney, Australia.

== History ==
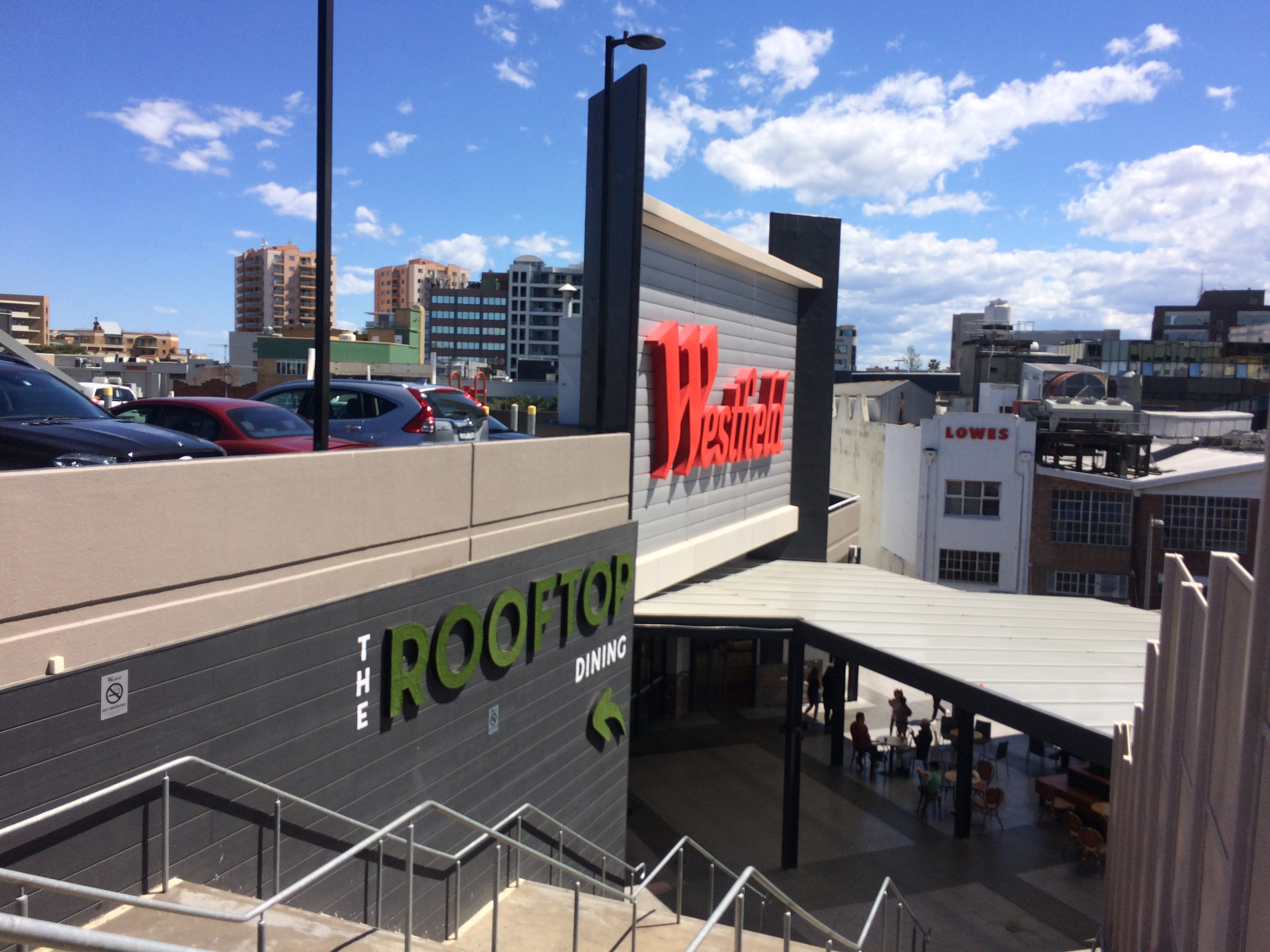
Entry from rooftop stairs

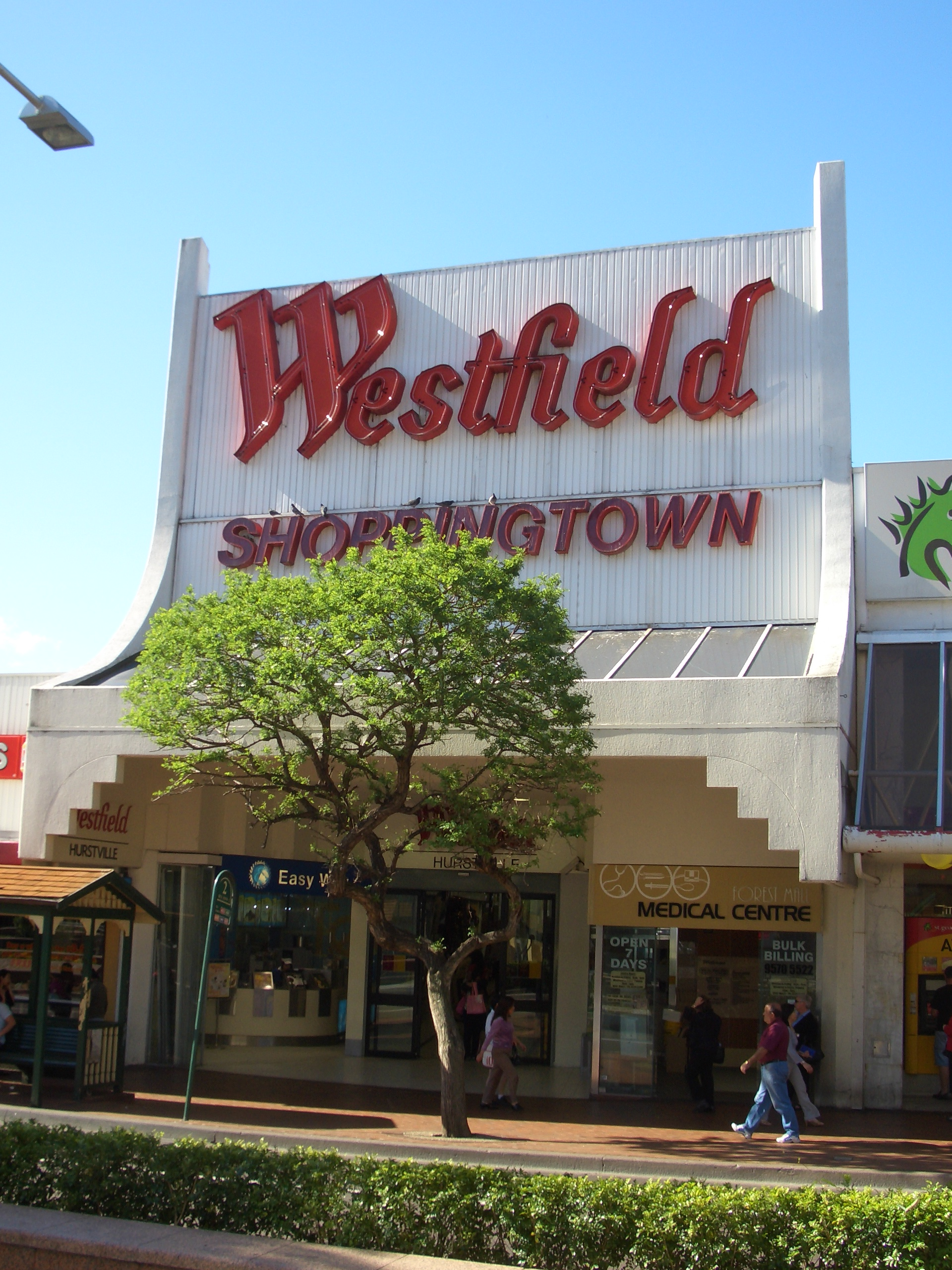
Entrance from Forest Road

Westfield Hurstville officially opened on 9 October 1978 by Premier of New South Wales Neville Wran. The centre was first announced in 1975 with a cost of $30 million was hailed as "the start of a new and greater shopping era for St George". It was a joint venture between the council and Westfield.

The centre featured Coles New World, Waltons (originally located at Southside Plaza at Rockdale), Nock & Kirby, Franklins and Best & Less. It was the first shopping centre in Australia to feature a quiet park on top of the centre. The park was known as Snowy Hill Park which was named after former alderman and mayor of Hurstville, Gordon William 'Snowy' Hill. Hill who served 19 years at the council, being elected mayor in 1962 and 1963. He died on 2 June 1978. The decision to name the park in recognition of Hill's services to the local community was made at a Special Hurstville Municipal Meeting shortly after his death. A pedestrian ramp from Croft's Avenue was constructed to allow pedestrian access to the park from street level. The park was officially opened by Mr Kevin Ryan MLA, former mayor of Hurstville, on 7 April 1979 and was popular for shoppers who wanted a quiet break from shopping. In 1987, the Waltons chain was sold by Alan Bond to the Cookes family in which the remaining stores split into Venture and Norman Ross.

Westfield Hurstville was redeveloped extended across Park Road towards The Avenue with a retail bridge linking both sides of the centre in the 1990s. Grace Bros, Kmart, Greater Union cinema and 125 speciality stores were added to the centre as part of the extension. The celebration of the opening of the redevelopment and the opening of Grace Bros was held on 10 April 1990. The Grace Bros store was originally planned to open in the Southside Plaza at Rockdale, but due to David Jones planning to open a Hurstville store, with a possible site near the current location of Hurstville Library on Queens Road, Grace Bros amended the plan and opened at Hurstville. Venture, which took over Norman Ross, relocated from its original space to the space next to Grace Bros. Snowy Hill park was later converted to the rooftop carpark. The Greater Union opened on 28 June 1990 which breathed life into what was a ghost town after 5pm. After the redevelopment of the centre, shops on Forest Road started to decline after the centre took trade away from the street and the plans for a pedestrian mall on Forest Road, to be known as Forest Road Mall or Hurstville Boulevard, were proposed.

In 1993 the two-level Venture store closed and was taken over by Toys "R" Us.

In the mid 1990s, many high-end stores and stores such as Brashs and Intencity closed. Intencity previously opened in 1995 and was the first in the chain to open on the space vacated by BBC Hardware and part of Waltons until it was taken over by Target in 1997. The Toys "R" Us store shrunk to become a one-level store with the bottom level of the store taken over by Rebel Sport which then was taken over by Aldi.

By 1998, Westfield Hurstville was beginning to experience a downturn in trade. The building was starting to age and many stores had closed. Franklins closed in 2001 and was taken over by Food For Less in 2002 and operated until November 2015 when Woolworths opened at the other end of the centre. Food For Less was taken over by Tong Li Supermarket and a medical centre. Grace Bros (renamed to Myer in 2004) became sole department store until its closure in early 2015. Despite having many variety stores added, the centre was criticised from 2015 and onwards for lack of high-end retailers, department stores and having too many discount and cheap stores. It was also criticised for being run down and in need of redevelopment.

In 2004, Deutsche Bank Real Estate acquired a 50% shareholding.

== Recent development ==
=== 2015 redevelopment ===
In early 2015, Myer made a departure from the centre after deciding to not renew their lease and was followed by Toys "R" Us. In March 2015, the centre underwent a $100 million redevelopment which was completed by 18 November 2015. The centre celebrated the opening of the redevelopment on 19 November 2015.

The redevelopment consists of:

- A full line Woolworths and JB Hi-Fi on the lower floor of the former Myer space
- A Big W and Cotton On on the upper floor of the former Myer space.
- A Rebel Sport was added to the centre on the half of Kmart
- A new relocated Best & Less on the space vacated by Toys "R" Us
- A rooftop alfresco dining precinct.
- A refurbished Greater Union Cinema renamed Event Cinemas which added a large VMAX screen (the largest in the Southern Hemisphere)
- New floor finishes, lighting, ceiling treatments, furniture and soft furnishings
- New ticketless, number-plate recognition system parking

Westfield Hurstville is expected to reach an average of $17 million in spending and can support a trade area of over 329,000 people.

=== New department stores ===
A new major department store to replace the existing Target store and adjacent mini major at a cost $15.3 million was announced on 6 January 2018. There are also plans for two additional retail shops at the Rose Street entry to the centre and a relocated and expanded centre management office on the rooftop area on level five. This development was approved by Georges River Council on 21 June 2018. There were speculations that the new department store would be David Jones, however the company has declined to comment.

In July 2019, it was then announced that three new mini-majors would replace the previous Target store, including a Uniqlo on the right-hand side which opened on 19 September 2019, a TK Maxx on the left which opened on 12 September 2019, and another retailer (yet to be revealed) in the middle, as well as a JD Sports, which opened on 10 October 2019 in the former adjacent mini major space.

== Future ==
Plans for six towers up to 20 storeys high and containing 1249 units could be built above the centre under a planning proposal before Georges River Council. The towers would be approximately 18 to 20 storeys above the existing centre from the top of the roof carpark and each tower would include 456 residential apartments, 793 mixed use units consisting of serviced apartments and student accommodation. There are also requests to increase the floor space of the development. If approved by the council, the planning proposal will go to the Department of Planning for Gateway before being put on exhibition for public comment. The plans are expected to be finalised by March 2018.

== Incidents ==
- On 4 July 2003, a woman aged in her 60s fell five floors to her death from a rooftop carpark. Reports from the media of this incident was suicide.
- On 22 September 2010, a suspicious brown package was found outside the centre at 1 am and the police bomb squad was called. The bag was later deemed not dangerous and security clothing tags were stashed inside the bag, which was taken away by police about 2.45 am.
- On 4 November 2014, shopping trolleys were thrown off from a rooftop carpark which landed on a car and bus. A woman in her 50s who was in the car suffered minor injuries and was treated at the scene. Two boys aged 15 and 16 were taken into police custody and were cautioned under the Young Offenders Act.
- On 10 March 2015, a suitcase full of Italian jewellery worth $100,000 was stolen from a wholesale jeweller as he walked through the centre car park. The 55-year-old victim was returning to his car at 3.30 pm when the attack took place. He turned around and saw two men running at him with one of them striking his arm. The jeweller dropped his suitcase and the other offender grabbed it before running to a waiting Mitsubishi Magna and fleeing.
- On 3 February 2016, a bus driver was crushed between his own 46-seater bus and a parked bus outside the centre and died. Police said that the 41- year-old, was hit seconds after he left his vehicle, which police say rolled forward. Despite the desperate efforts of paramedics, the driver died at the scene in Park Rd.
- On 16 September 2019, a brawl erupted outside Woolworths as shoppers wrestle to get their hands on baby formula.
