= Carlton railway station, Sydney =

Railway station in Sydney, New South Wales, Australia

Carlton
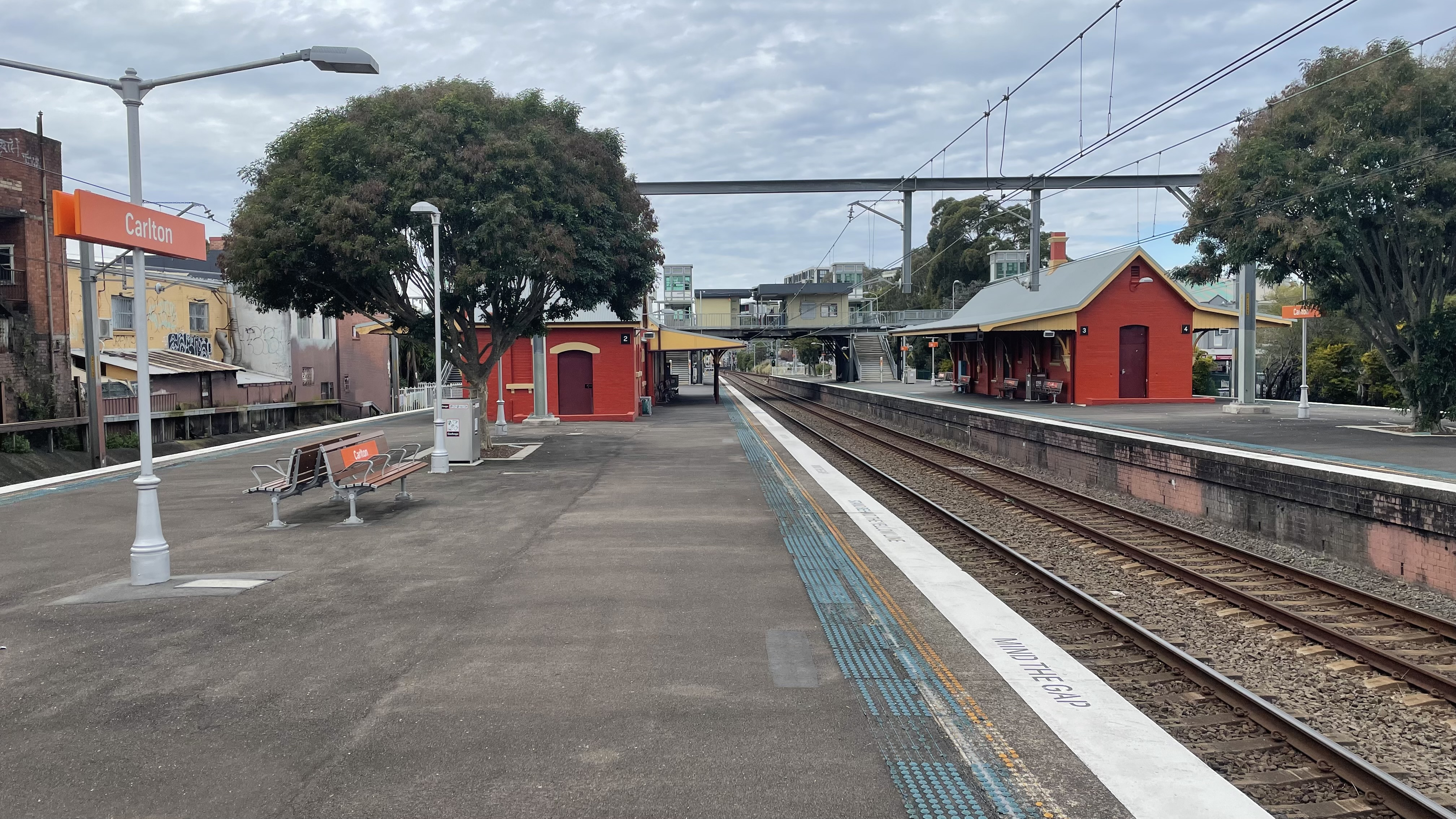
- Northbound view from Platform 3 in June 2022

General information
- Location: Railway Parade, Carlton; Sydney, New South Wales; Australia
- Coordinates: 33°58′06″S 151°07′28″E
- Owner: Transport Asset Manager of NSW
- Operator: Sydney Trains
- Line: South Coast
- Distance: 12.74 km (7.92 mi) from Central
- Platforms: 4 (2 island)
- Tracks: 4

Construction
- Structure type: Ground
- Accessible: Yes

Other information
- Status: Staffed
- Station code: CLJ
- Website: Transport for NSW

History
- Opened: 15 February 1887 (139 years ago)
- Electrified: Yes (from 1926)

Passengers
- 2025: 1,420.631 (year); 3,892 (daily) (Sydney Trains)
- Rank: 102

Services
| Preceding station | Sydney Trains | Following station |
|---|---|---|
| Allawah towards Waterfall or Cronulla | Eastern Suburbs & Illawarra Line | Kogarah towards Bondi Junction |
Location

Carlton railway station is a suburban railway station located on the South Coast line, serving the Sydney suburb of Carlton. It is served by Sydney Trains T4 Eastern Suburbs & Illawarra Line services.

== History ==
Carlton station opened on 15 February 1887, with proper station facilities constructed in 1889. Originally the station had two platforms, and as part of the quadruplication of the Illawarra line, a second island platform was added in 1925. In January 2008, lifts were installed at the station.

It is the closest station to Jubilee Oval with NSW TrainLink services from Wollongong making extra stops during St George Illawarra Dragons games.

On Sunday 21 July 2024, at around 12:15pm, it was reported that a double pram carrying twins had rolled onto the tracks, the father jumping down in an attempt to rescue them, however an oncoming train failed to stop in time and killed the 40-year-old man and one of the twins.

== Services ==
| Platform | Line | Stopping pattern | Notes |
| 1 | T4 | services to Bondi Junction | Peak platform |
| 2 | T4 | services to Hurstville | Peak platform |
| 3 | T4 | services to Bondi Junction | Off-peak platform |
| 4 | T4 | services to Cronulla, Waterfall & Helensburgh | Off-peak platform |

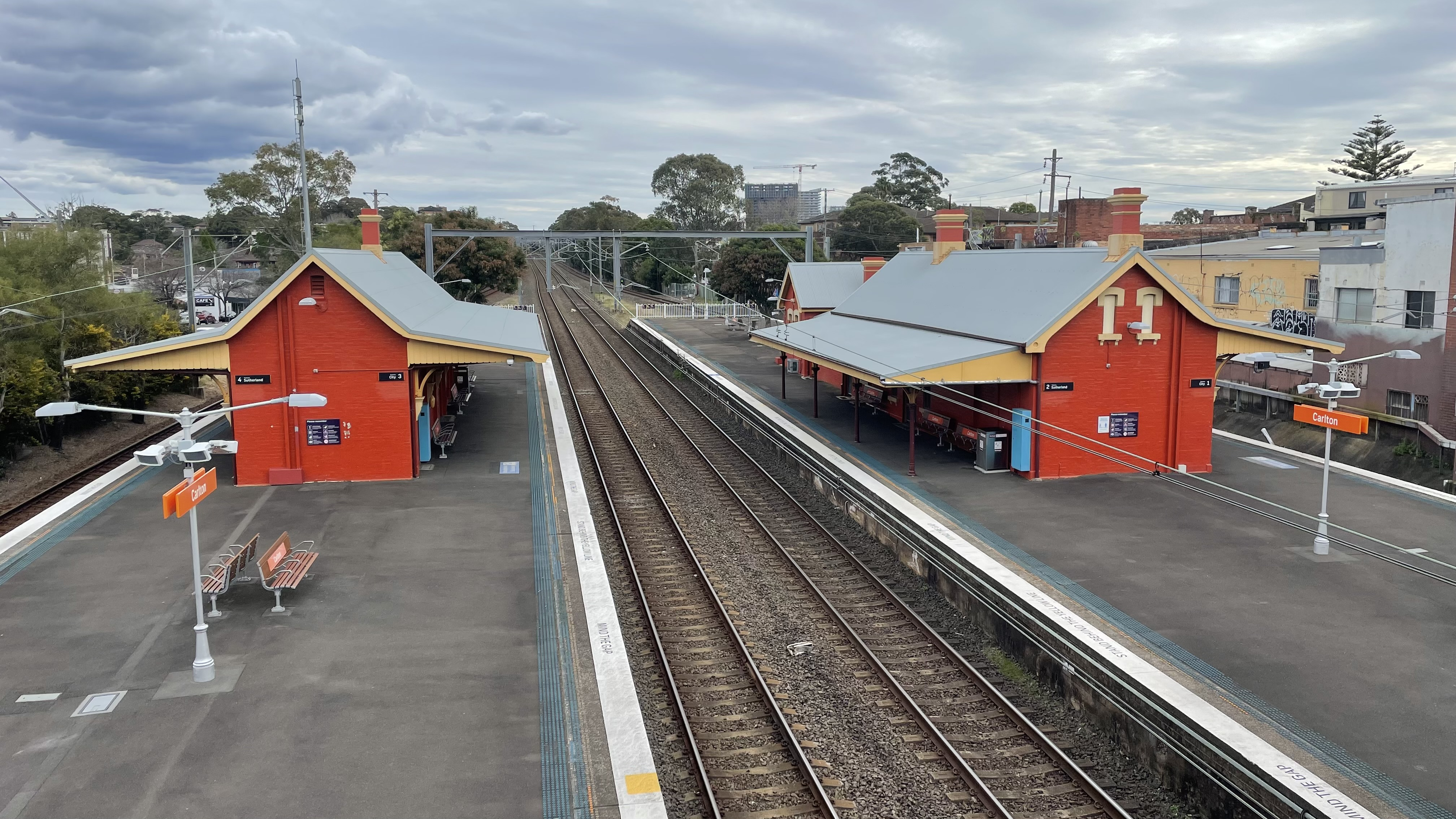
Southbound view of platforms from concourse

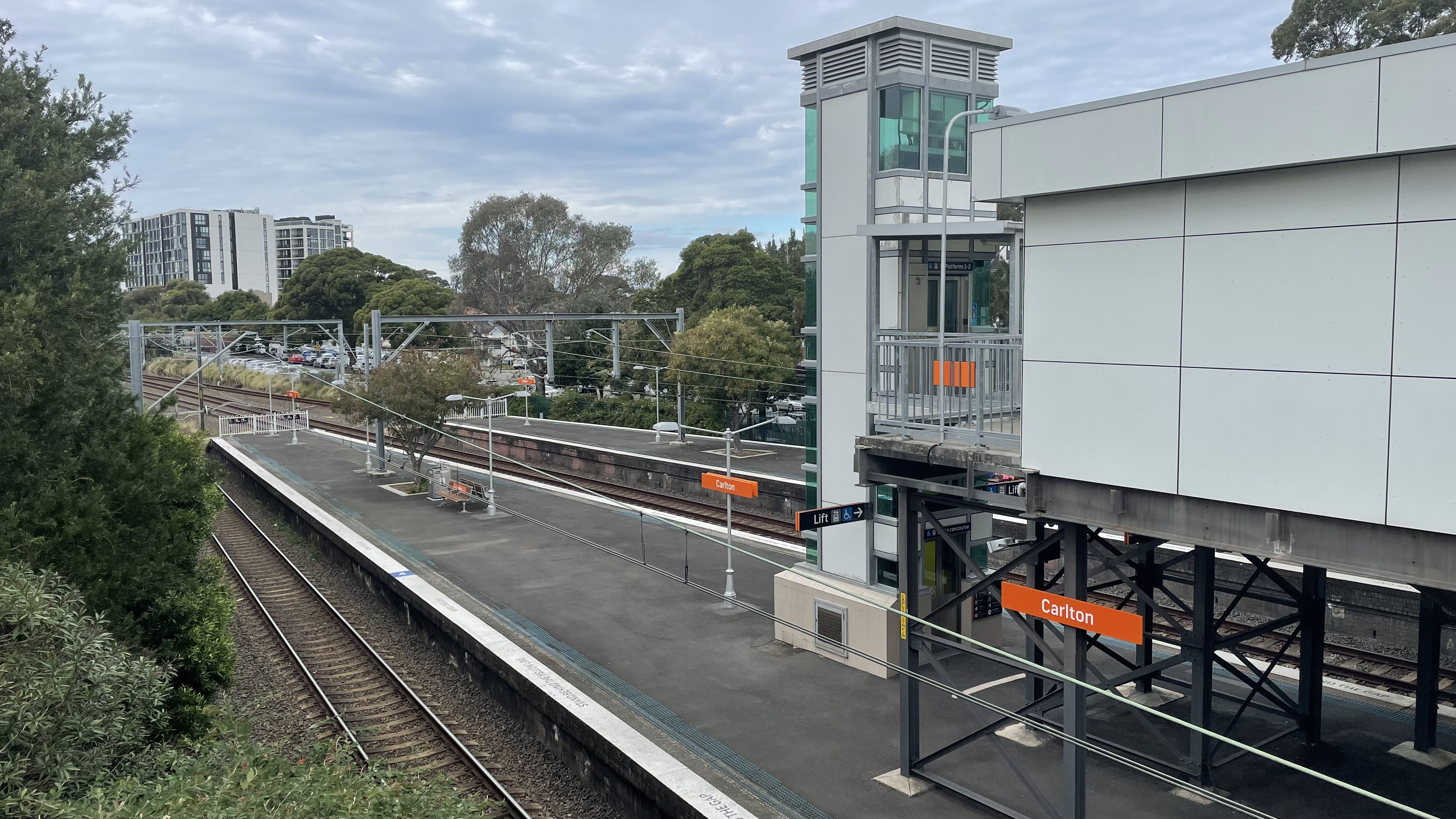
Northbound view of platforms from concourse

=== Bus services ===
Carlton railway station is served by two NightRide routes:

- N10: Sutherland station to Town Hall station
- N11: Cronulla station to Town Hall station
