= Rockdale Plaza =

Shopping centre in the suburb of Rockdale, Sydney, Australia

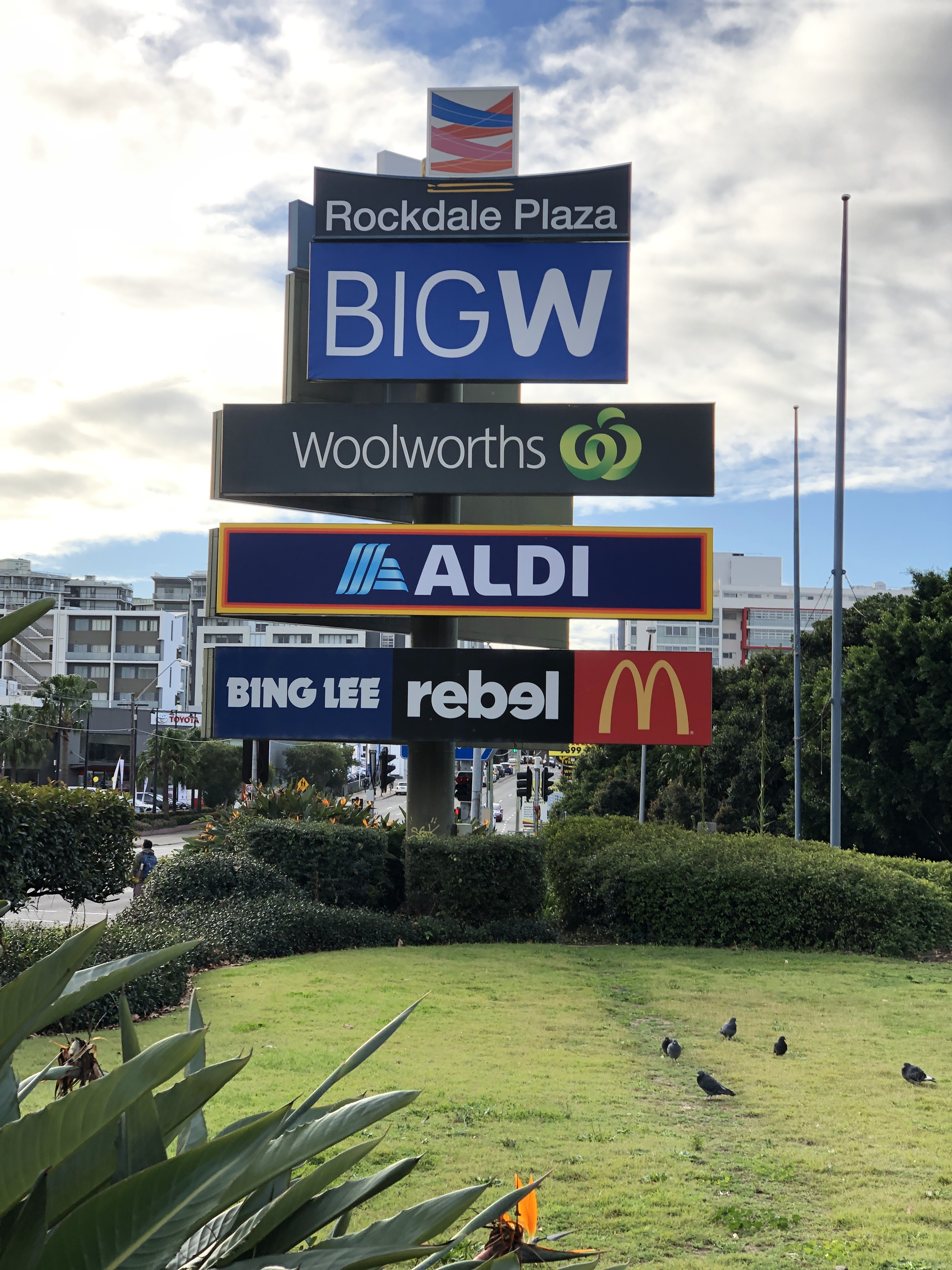
- Rockdale Plaza in 2019
- Location: Rockdale, New South Wales, Australia
- Address: 1 Rockdale Plaza Dr, Rockdale NSW 2216
- Opened: 15 August 1963; 63 years ago (Southside Plaza); 29 October 1997; 29 years ago (Rockdale Plaza)
- Manager: Charter Hall
- Owner: Charter Hall
- Num. of stores: 65
- Num. of anchor tenants: 3
- Floor area: 35,945 m^{2} (386,909 sq ft)
- Floors: 2
- Parking: 875
- Website: rockdaleplaza.com.au

Rockdale Plaza is a shopping centre located in the suburb of Rockdale in the St George area of Sydney.

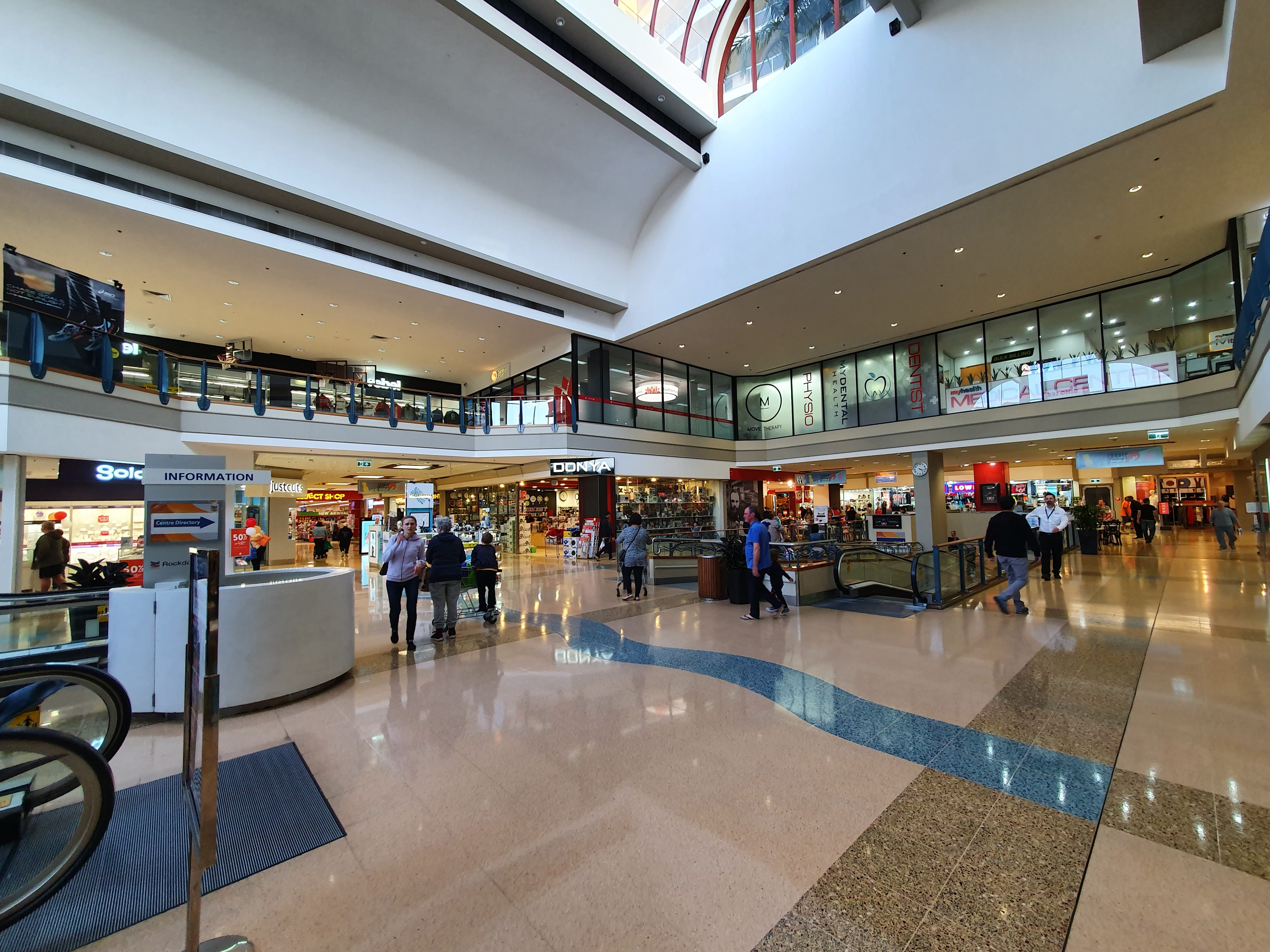
Interior of Rockdale plaza in 2019

== Transport ==
The Eastern Suburbs and Illawarra Line offer frequent services to Rockdale station.

Rockdale Plaza has bus connections to St George and Sutherland Shire, as well as local surrounding suburbs. It is served by Transit Systems NSW and U-Go Mobility services. Majority of its bus services located on Princes Highway and Rockdale Plaza Drive.

Rockdale Plaza has multi level car parks with 875 spaces.

== History ==
The original shopping centre known as Southside Plaza opened on 15 August 1963 by Rockdale MP Brian Bannon and was built over former market gardens, with tonnes of soil brought in to raise the ground level to the height of the Princes Highway.

Southside Plaza featured a Mark Foy's, Woolworths Food Fair (rebranded to Flemings in the 1980s and later to Woolworths), Franklins, AMF Bowling Alley and 33 stores. The bowling alley remained separate from the centre despite proposals to join them. Opening in 1963, Southside Plaza led the way in the retail revolution, which swept through southern Sydney in the 1960s. It also hosted a trash and treasure market on Sundays.

In 1967 Mark Foys was extensively damaged by fire. It was then rebuilt and became a McDowells store and then was rebranded as Waltons in 1972. In 1978 Waltons relocated to the newly built Westfield Hurstville and the space became vacant.

The opening of Roselands and the redeveloped Miranda Fair had been blamed for a downturn in trade at Southside Plaza, and various redevelopment proposals were proposed but never eventuated. In 1992 Southside Plaza was demolished and construction started on redeveloping the site.

Rockdale Plaza opened on 29 October 1997 and featured Big W, Franklins, Woolworths and over 50 specialty stores. Bowlers were informed that the Tenpin Bowling Alley would be incorporated into the new centre however it did not eventuate. In 2013, Franklins closed its store and the space was split in two, the spaces taken up by Best & Less and (from 16 October 2013) Aldi. Best & Less closed in July 2020 and Chemist Warehouse moved into its space.

In April 2019, Rockdale Plaza was purchased by Charter Hall for $142 million.
