= Hurstville railway station =

Railway station in Sydney, New South Wales, Australia

Hurstville
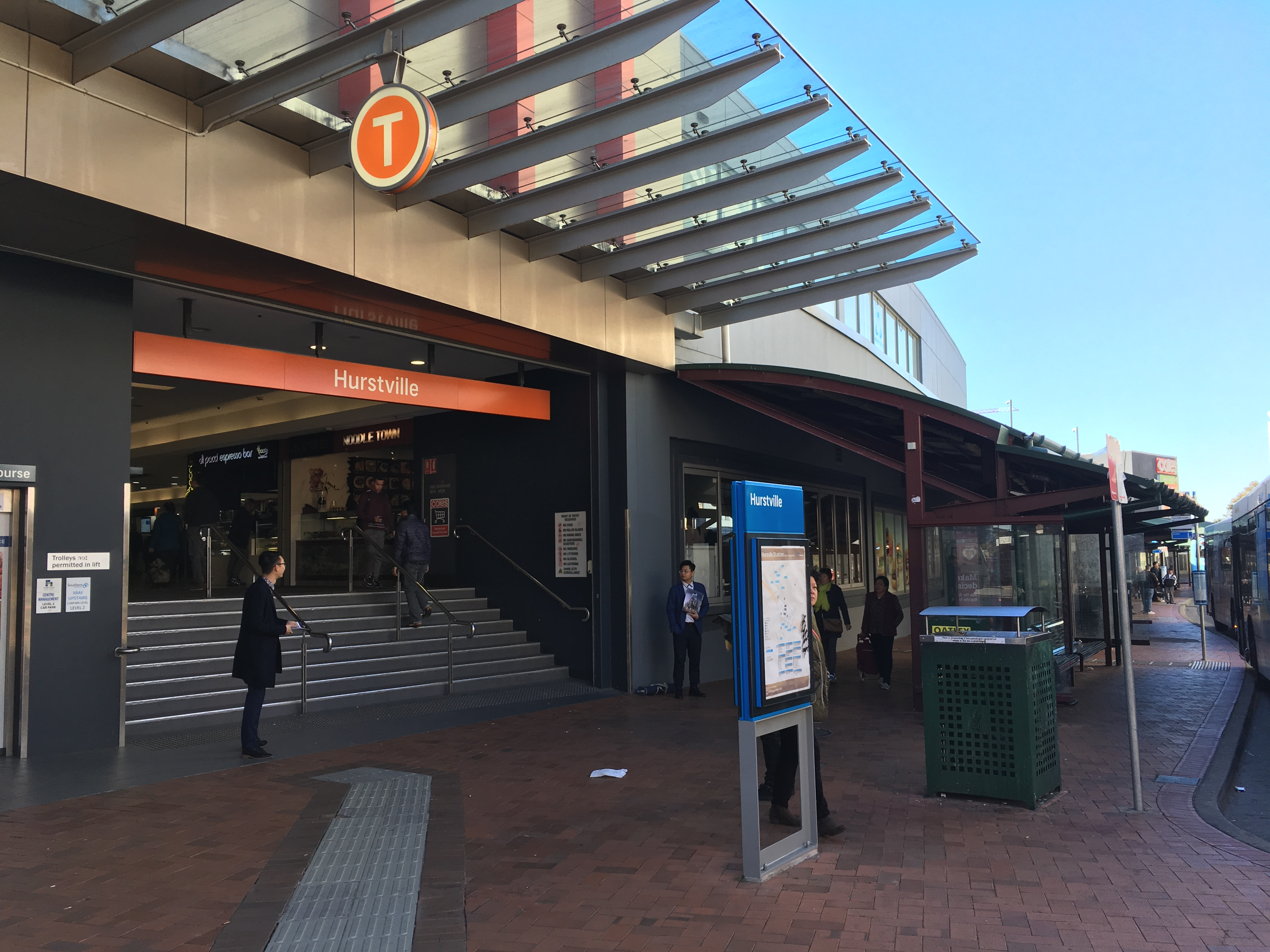
- Ormonde Parade concourse and entrance in July 2017

General information
- Location: Ormonde Parade, Hurstville; Sydney, New South Wales; Australia
- Coordinates: 33°58′02″S 151°06′09″E
- Elevation: 77 metres (253 ft)
- Owner: Transport Asset Manager of NSW
- Operator: Sydney Trains
- Line: South Coast
- Distance: 14.84 km (9.22 mi) from Central
- Platforms: 4 (2 island)
- Tracks: 4
- Bus routes: 410, 450, 452, 455, 490, 491, 940, 941, 943, 945, 947, 950, 953, 954, 955, 958, 959, 970, 971
- Bus operators: Transit Systems; U-Go Mobility
- Connections: Bus

Construction
- Structure type: Ground
- Accessible: Yes

Other information
- Status: Staffed
- Station code: HVL
- Website: Transport for NSW

History
- Opened: 15 October 1884 (142 years ago)
- Electrified: Yes (from 1926)

Passengers
- 2025: 10,991,163 (year); 30,113 (daily) (Sydney Trains)
- Rank: 14

Services
Preceding station	Sydney Trains	Following station
Terminus	Eastern Suburbs & Illawarra Line Weekday peak only	Allawah towards Bondi Junction
Penshurst towards Waterfall or Cronulla	Eastern Suburbs & Illawarra Line Off peak only	Allawah towards Bondi Junction
Penshurst towards Waterfall or Cronulla	Eastern Suburbs & Illawarra Line	Kogarah towards Bondi Junction
Penshurst towards Waterfall or Cronulla	Eastern Suburbs & Illawarra Line Weekday peak only	Wolli Creek towards Bondi Junction
Preceding station	Intercity Trains	Following station
Sutherland towards Kiama	South Coast Line	Wolli Creek towards Central or Bondi Junction
Location

Hurstville railway station is a suburban railway station located on the South Coast line, serving the Sydney suburb of Hurstville. It is served by Sydney Trains T4 Eastern Suburbs & Illawarra Line services and intercity South Coast Line services.

== History ==
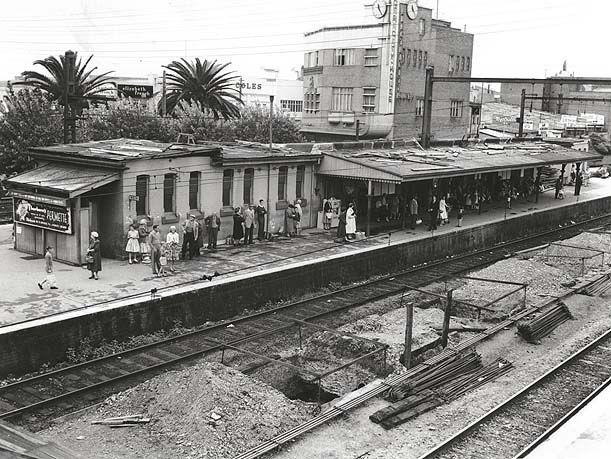
The station during construction of the shopping centre

Hurstville station opened on 15 October 1884 on the terminus of the Illawarra railway line from Redfern. On 26 December 1885, the line was extended to Sutherland. The station initially had two side platforms and two through running lines. When the line was duplicated in 1925, the station was rebuilt with two island platforms, with the southern platform serving the Illawarra main line and the northern platform serving the Illawarra Local (IL) line.

The Illawarra Local pair of tracks end at Hurstville, with the up track continuing a little further to the King Georges Rd underpass. Both tracks merge onto the Illawarra mainline. There are also three sidings branching off the Up Illawarra Local, which are now unused with some track lifted.

In 1920, five people were killed when two trains collided while one was shunting at the station.

In 1965, the air rights above the platforms were covered by the Hurstville Super Centre shopping centre, one of the first suburban stations in Sydney to receive such treatment of its overhead airspace.

The original station buildings survived underneath until demolished during refurbishment in the early 1990s. Prior to September 1998, the station received an easy access upgrade which included lifts to each platform.

The centre was refurbished in 2008 and rebranded Hurstville Central.

There have previously been plans to build several residential towers above the station but these plans have been shelved over concerns about the integrity of overhead supports in the event of a derailment.

In late 2019, as part of the Transport for NSW's More Trains More Services program, a crossover was proposed to be built east of the station, to allow Hurstville to Bondi Junction all station services to swap operation from the Illawarra Local tracks to the Illawarra Main tracks and utilise platforms 3 & 4 instead of 1 & 2. The crossover would optimise the capacity of T4 and South Coast Line services along the Illawarra railway line corridor. Construction began in 2020 and it was commissioned and brought into service in February 2024, with final works completed in June 2024.

== Services ==
=== Platforms ===
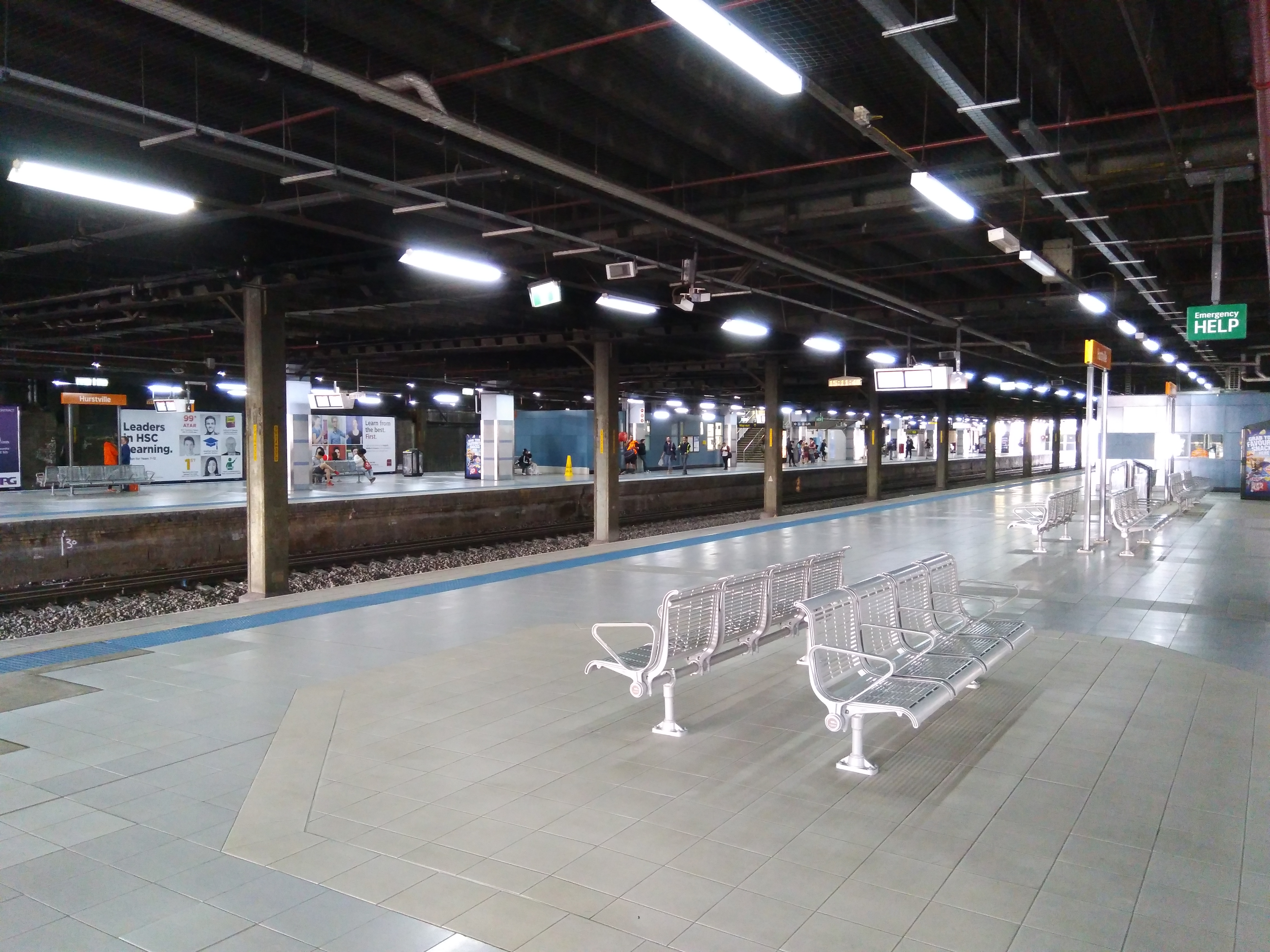
The platforms

Platform	Line	Stopping pattern	Notes
1	Eastern Suburbs & Illawarra Line	peak hour terminating and returning local services to Bondi Junction. Some off peak services to Bondi Junction.	
1	South Coast Line	some services to Central or Bondi Junction.	
2	Eastern Suburbs & Illawarra Line	peak hour terminating and returning local services to Bondi Junction. Some off peak services to Cronulla and Waterfall.	
2	South Coast Line	some services to Kiama.	
3	Eastern Suburbs & Illawarra Line	services to Bondi Junction.	
3	South Coast Line	services to Central, Martin Place & Bondi Junction.	
4	Eastern Suburbs & Illawarra Line	services to Cronulla, Waterfall & Helensburgh.	
4	South Coast Line	services to Wollongong, Dapto & Kiama.	

=== Transport links ===
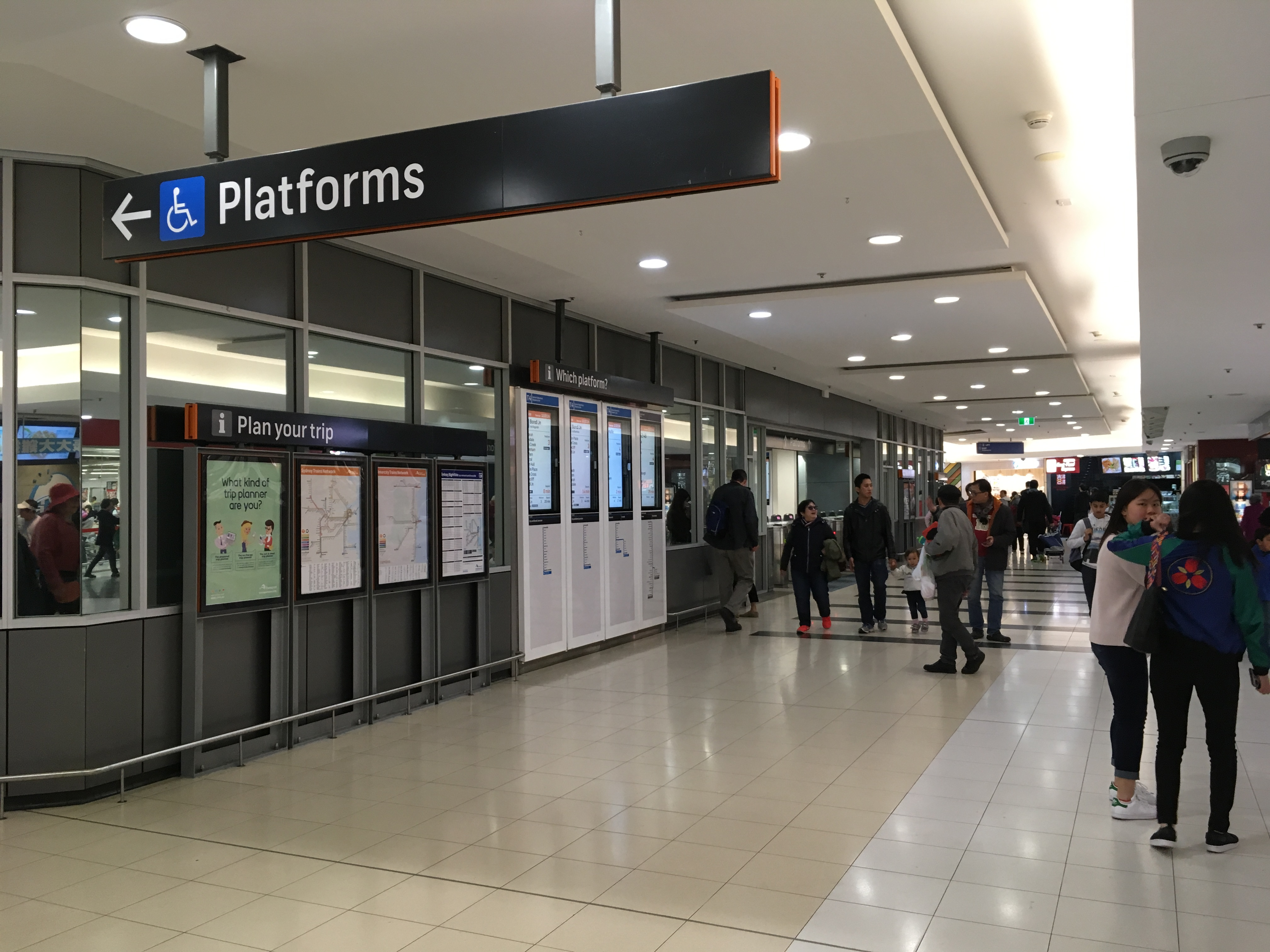
Unpaid concourse within the Hurstville Central shopping centre

The twenty-two bus routes operated via Hurstville station are spread throughout twelve bus stands, labelled as Stands A through M.

Transit Systems operates three bus routes via Hurstville station:

- 410 to Marsfield
- 490: to Drummoyne
- 491: to Five Dock

U-Go Mobility operates seventeen bus routes via Hurstville station:

- 450: to Strathfield station via Roselands Shopping Centre
- 452: Beverly Hills station to Rockdale station
- 455: Kingsgrove to Rockdale Plaza
- 940: to Bankstown station via Riverwood
- 941: to Chullora Marketplace (Greenacre) via Roselands Shopping Centre
- 945: to Bankstown station via Mortdale station
- 947: to Kogarah station via Ramsgate
- 949: to Lugarno
- 950: to Bankstown station via Padstow station
- 952: to Roselands Shopping Centre
- 953: to Kyle Bay, Connells Point & South Hurstville
- 954: to Hurstville Grove
- 955: to Mortdale via Oatley
- 958: to Rockdale Plaza via Carss Park
- 959: to Bald Face
- 970: to Westfield Miranda via Sylvania Heights
- 971: to South Cronulla via Sylvania & Miranda

Hurstville railway station is served by two NightRide routes:

- N10: Sutherland station to Town Hall station
- N11: Cronulla station to Town Hall station
