= New South Wales Tulloch double deck carriage stock =

Class of carriages

Tulloch double deck carriage stock
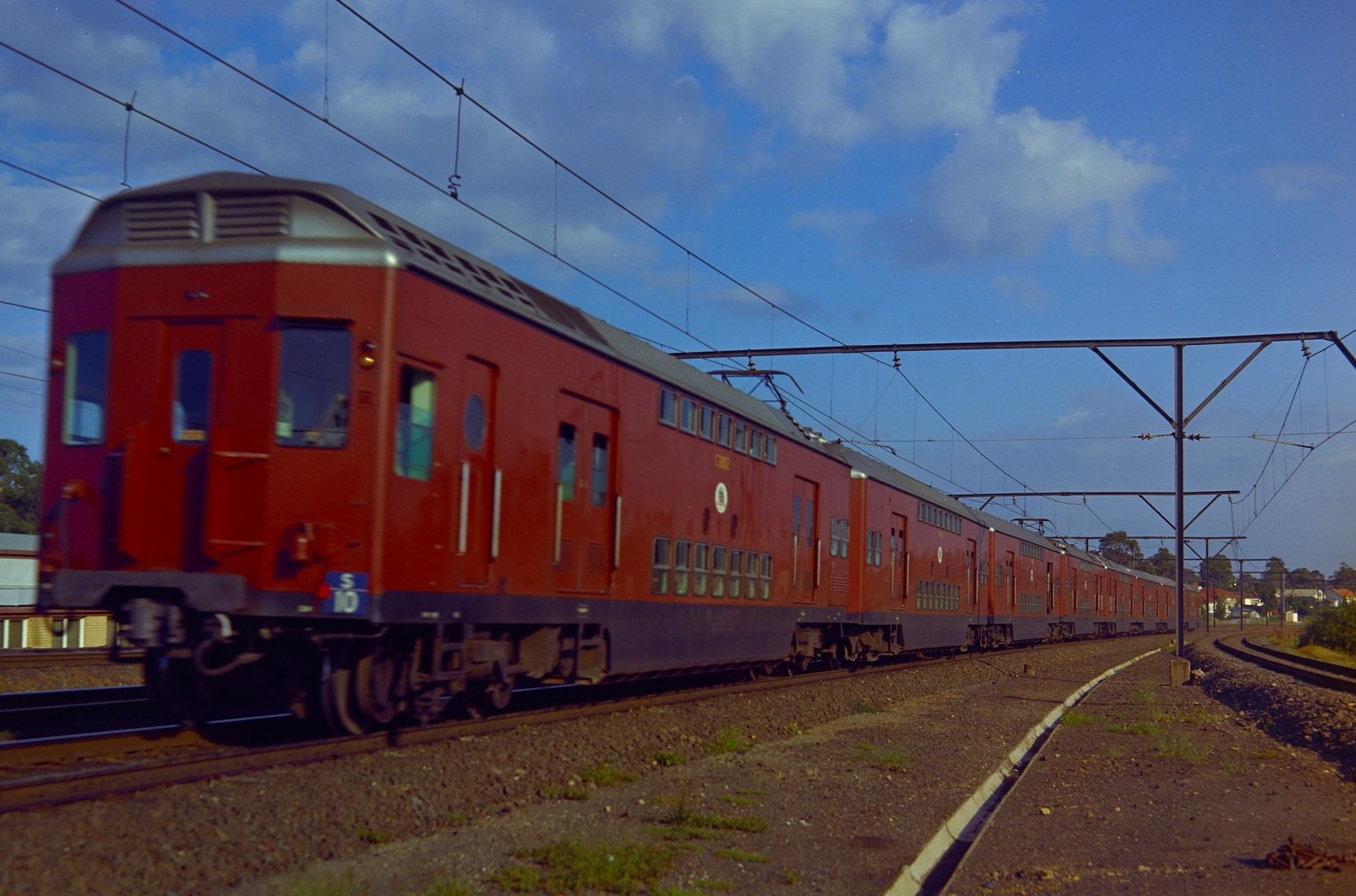
- Set S10 at Pendle Hill in 1970

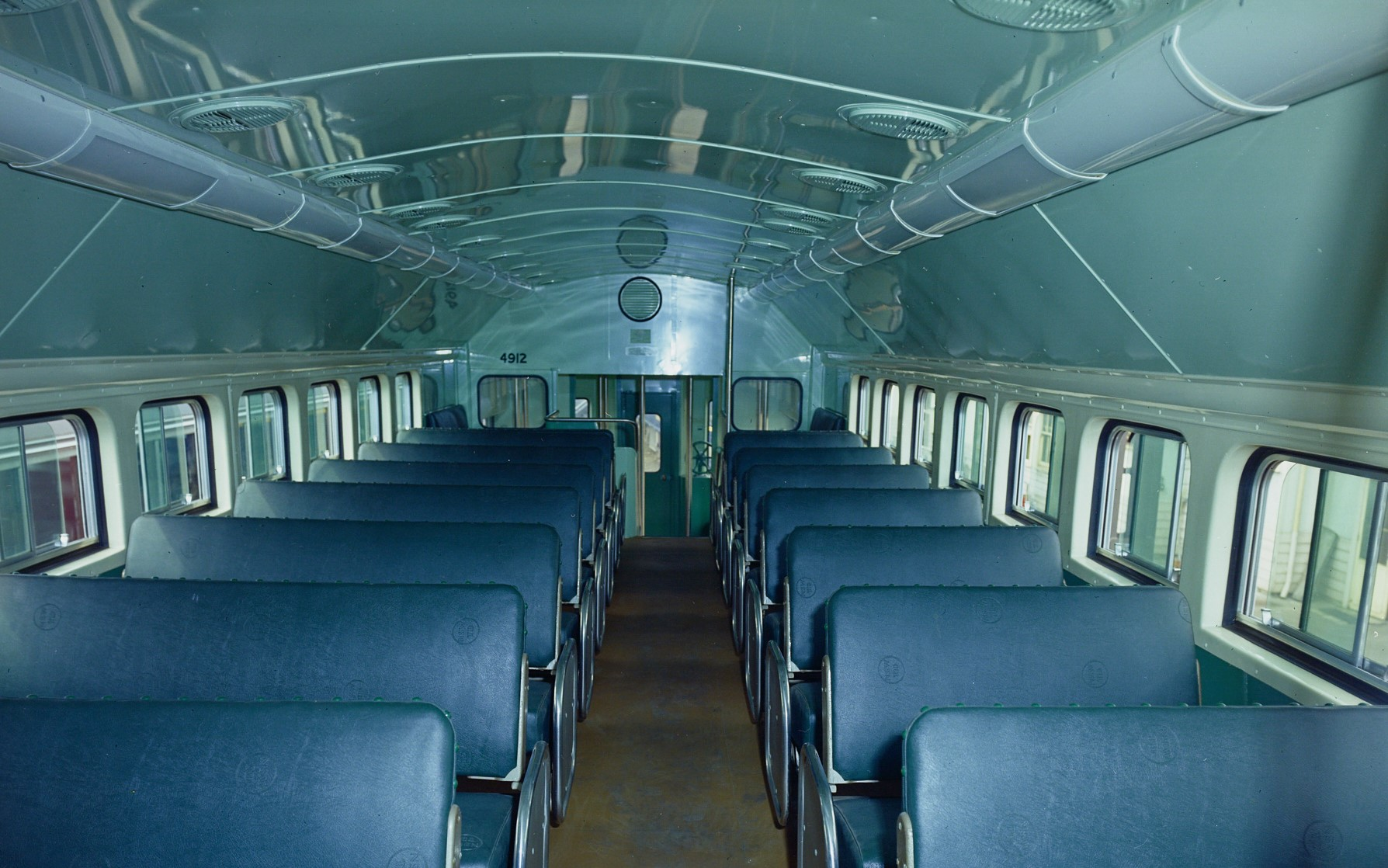
- Upper deck interior of trailer car T4912
- Stock type: Electric multiple unit (EMU)
- In service: 1969–1976 (power cars); 1964–2004 (trailer cars)
- Manufacturer: Tulloch Limited
- Designer: Roy Leembruggen (trailers)
- Built at: Rhodes
- Constructed: 1964–1968
- Scrapped: 1989-1990-1993-2005
- Number built: 124 carriages
- Number preserved: At least 25 carriages
- Number scrapped: At least 99 carriages
- Predecessor: Wooden trailers
- Successor: M set
- Formation: 4 carriages M-T-T-M
- Fleet numbers: T4801–T4920 (trailer carriages) C3801–C3804 (motor carriages)
- Capacity: 132 seated
- Operators: New South Wales Government Railways; Public Transport Commission; State Rail Authority; CityRail
- Depots: Flemington (in S sets); Hornsby (in S sets); Mortdale (in M sets); Punchbowl (in B and W sets)
- Line served: All Sydney suburban

Specifications
- Car body construction: Double deck design
- Car length: 19.46 m (63 ft 10 1/4 in) over body
- Width: 3,050 mm (10 ft 0 in) over body
- Height: 4,380 mm (14 ft 4 1/2 in)
- Doors: 4x2 slide 1,676 mm (5 ft 6 in) wide 32 V DC (manual door operation); 120 V DC (power door operation)
- Maximum speed: 113 km/h (70 mph)
- Weight: 32.15 t (31.64 long tons; 35.44 short tons)
- Electric system: 1500 V DC Catenary
- Current collection: Pantograph
- Bogies: TR type
- Braking system: Clasp type
- Multiple working: EMU type
- Track gauge: 1,435 mm (4 ft 8 1/2 in) standard gauge

The Tulloch double deck carriage stock are a class of electric multiple unit (EMU) carriages built by Tulloch Limited and operated by the New South Wales Government Railways and its successors between 1964 and 2004. They were nicknamed "Tullochs" and "Tulloch double deckers".

They were the first double deck rolling stock built for the New South Wales railway network and are widely accredited for setting the standard design of later electric rolling stock. At the time of their withdrawal, they were the oldest working carriages on the rail network, having served in both single deck and double deck sets, with some having been in both.

Also included amongst these new carriages were four double deck motor carriage prototypes built that would be used as a basis for future motor carriages built for the New South Wales Railways.

== History ==
=== Trailer carriages ===
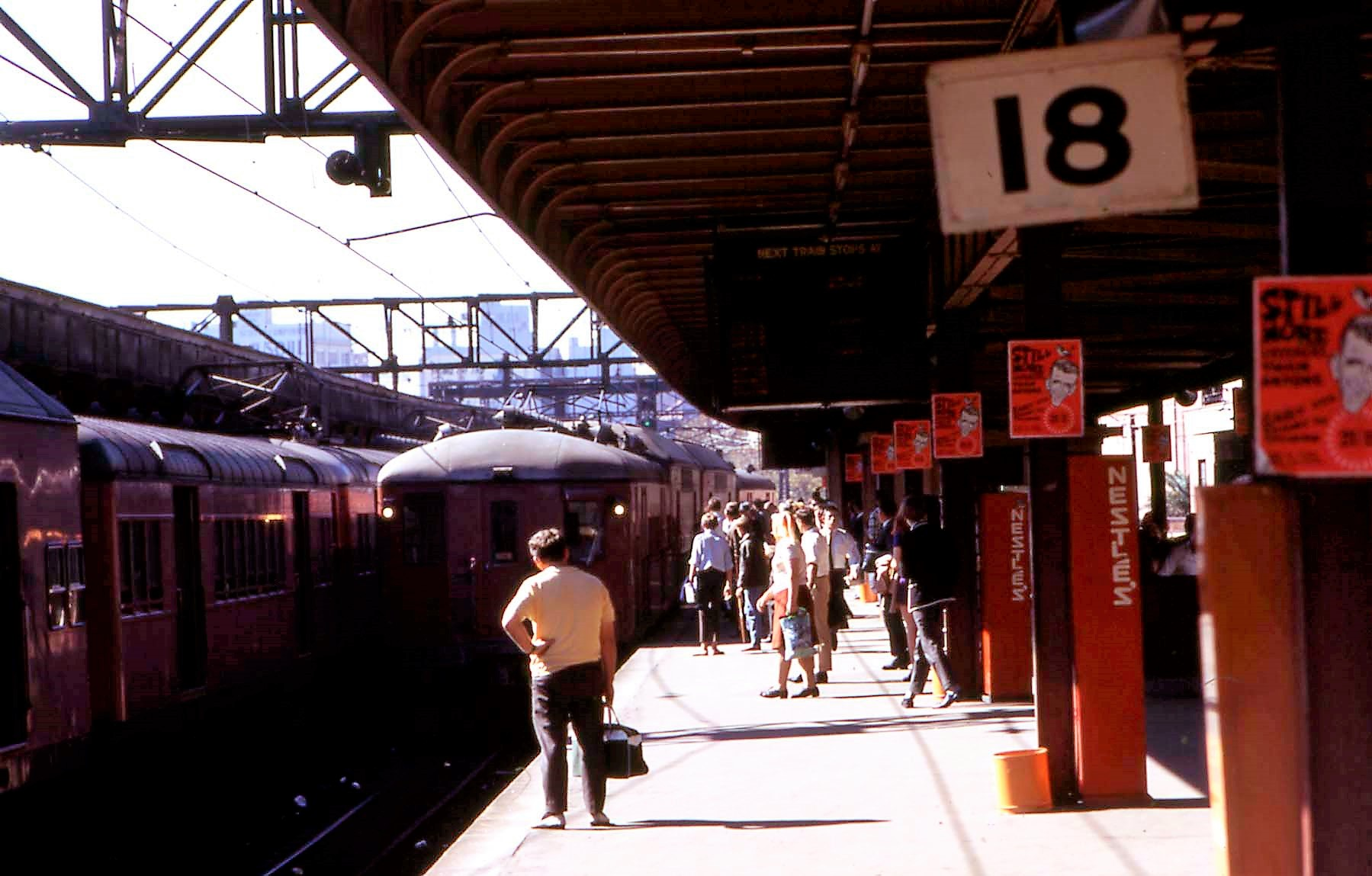
Tulloch double deck carriages in both manual door and powered door sets at Central railway station in 1970

In February 1964, the first of 120 double deck trailers was delivered by Tulloch Limited to the New South Wales Government Railways. These were purchased to replace wooden trailer carriage stock from Sydney's suburban fleet that had been converted for usage with the single deck Wooden motor cars in the early 1920s.

The first 40 were built with power operated doors to operate with the 1955 type power cars, replacing the trailers (T4701–T4740), resulting in them being converted from powered to manual doors with the carriage numbers being increased by 50 making them T4751–T4790 and put into manual door suburban sets.

The remaining 80 were fitted with manually operated doors for operation with the Standard, Tulloch single deck, and even timber stock. These last 80 carriages built were placed in the manual doors sets based at Punchbowl and Mortdale after a series of trials to test the power of the older single deck motor cars.

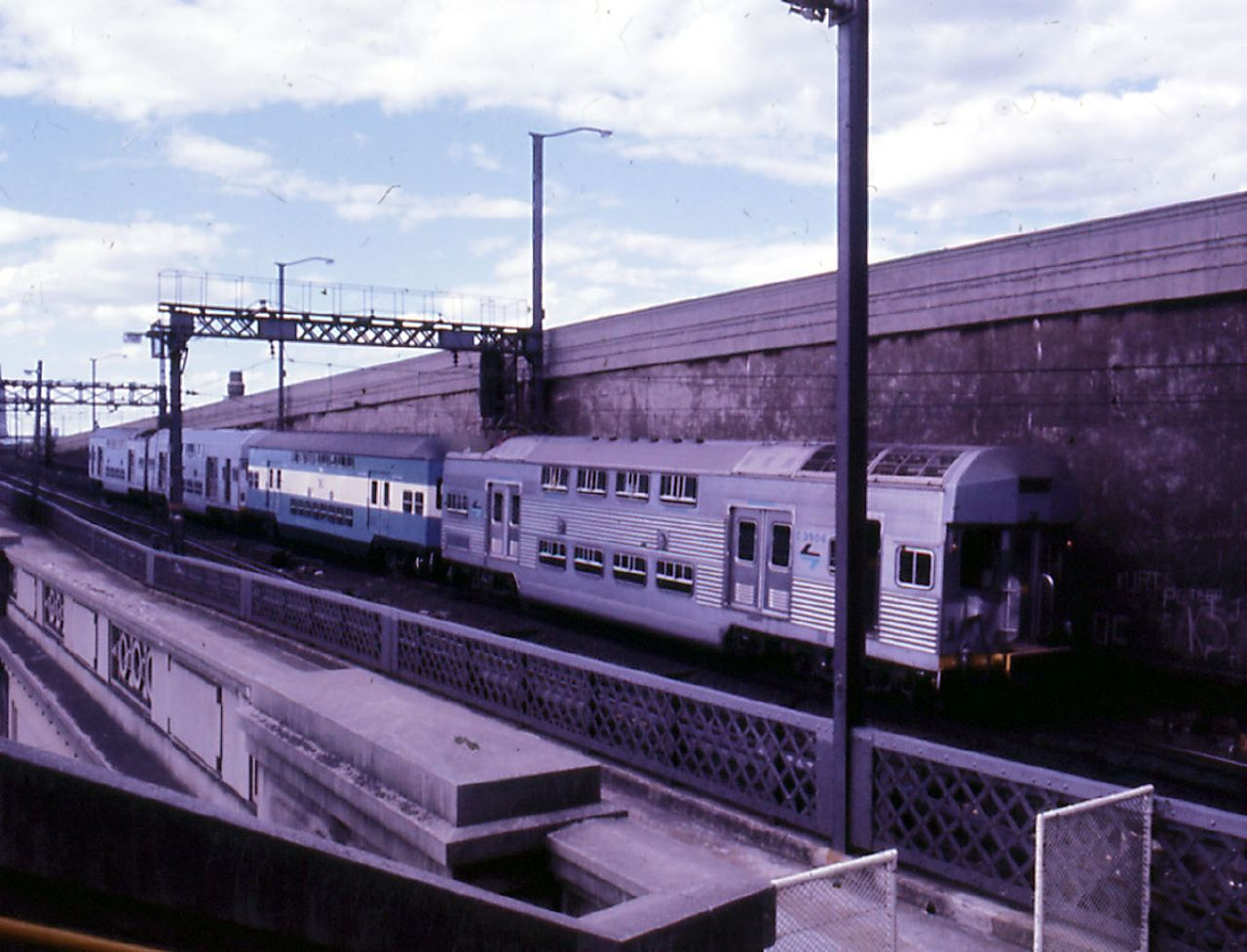
Tulloch carriage in a four car S set in 1977

Further carriages were converted to power door operation in 1972/73 to operate with the Series 1 double deck S set motor carriages. After the conversions were completed, T4801–T4838 formed part of the W sets, T4839–T4895 were part of the S sets and T4896–T4920 were operated in manual door form with Suburban and single deck Tulloch stock. In 1987, cars T4834–T4838 were converted from power operated doors to manual doors.

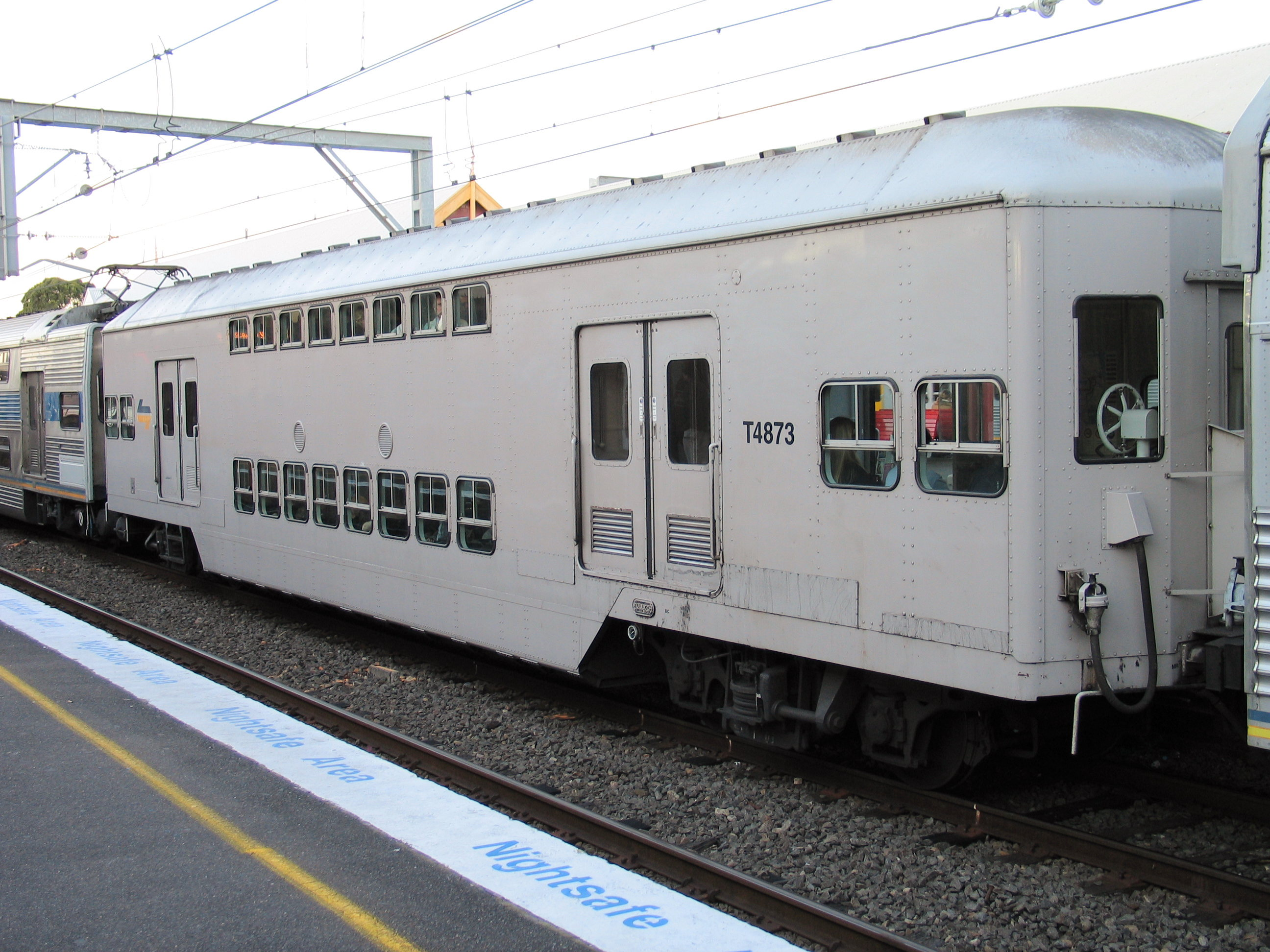
T4873 at Sydenham station in July 2003

Originally painted Tuscan red, from 1973 they were repainted in the Public Transport Commission blue and white livery, although this livery was applied differently on some carriages with the Riviera white stripe being painted on higher up on some carriages than others before the livery was changed to Indian red in 1976, but not all cars were repainted.

In 1992, T4812, T4816, T4830, and T4807 on set W1 were painted in the "Sesqui Train" livery in celebration of 150 years of the city of Sydney, and T4810, T4828, T4825, and T4820 on W2 were repainted in the "Zoo Train Mk2" livery in 1992 to advertise Taronga Zoo. In order to create a consistency with the stainless steel carriages they operated with, T4852 and T4867 were repainted in an experimental silver livery.

After a three-year lapse, T4872 was repainted flake grey, a livery that was gradually rolled out to the remaining Tulloch carriages in S sets with the last completed in June 1993. The interiors were painted in two-tone green, but some cars in S sets had their lower decks painted in flake grey and some in black. Some were refurbished in accordance with the CityDecker program being given white walls, blue seats and yellow passenger doors like the other S set cars.

Those operating in single deck sets were withdrawn by November 1993, while those in S sets remained in service until the end of March 2004, being replaced by the "Millennium" M sets built by Downer Rail in the late 1990s and early 2000s. As these last trailer cars were retired, 23 S set power cars were converted into trailers to fill the imbalance of power to trailer cars in the fleet. In October 2005, the remaining S set Tulloch cars were stored at Eveleigh, Rozelle and Maintrain at Auburn awaiting disposal, however this was delayed by concerns over asbestos. Eventually, the majority were moved to Maintrain with all scrapped by December 2005.

=== Experimental motor carriages ===
Set S10 (C3804, T4844, T4843, C3803, C3802, T4840, T4839 and C3801) at Central Railway station, March 1969

In 1966, tenders were called for double deck power car prototypes to take advantage of the advances in electric carriage technology being made at the time. Tulloch Limited won the contract in 1967 and in mid to late 1968 would build four new prototype power cars numbered C3801-C3804 with the latter being the first one to be completed.

These power cars were put into an eight car set with trailers T4839, T4840, T4843 and T4844 that was targeted "S10" following on from the Comeng single deck sets that were targeted S1-S9 in 1957. Originally, the set was to operate with trailers T4841–T4844, but T4841 and T4842 were replaced by T4839 and T4840 as the W sets could only operate with the latter two.

To operate with the four experimental double deck power cars, in 1968, trailers T4843 and T4844 were converted for powered door operation before the experimental consist underwent trials for testing and repair.

Set S10 (C3801, T4839, T4840, C3802, C3803, T4843, T4844 and C3804) entered revenue earning service on 6 January 1969, with the set gaining itself the nickname "The Flying Nun" by the rail circles.

S10 proved unreliable as the train broke down regularly. A problem which was worsened by all four power cars having electrical systems coming from different manufacturers. The less than adequate reliability of the experimental power cars incentivized substitution with the more standardized W set motor cars.

In spite of these problems, the train was considered successful enough that all trains built following would be of double deck design with 53 new motor cars (C3805-C3857) built by Comeng in the early 1970s continuing from the numbers of the Tulloch motor carriages, and cars C3805 and C3806 were placed into set "S11" following on from the targeting of the experimental S10 set.

Due to the non-standard nature of their electrical systems, following the withdrawal and disbandment of the S10 consist, three of the four power cars were to be converted into trailer cars. This would involve the removal of most of the electrical equipment including driver's controls, and pantographs with all cars sent for conversion at the Electric Carriage workshops in Chullora.

One of these motor carriages, C3801 was first stored at Punchbowl until 1977 before it was transferred with the other three and would have its electrical equipment removed in 1978, before returning to active service, renumbered as T4797 in 1980, followed by C3803, as it had its electrical equipment removed in the same year before re-entering service under the new number T4799 in 1982 with the cab converted for seating of 16 passengers as well as the crew doors sealed off with panels.

While C3802 was also set to be converted into a trailer car and be renumbered as T4798, this process was never finished as its brakes where adjusted poorly and would apply too early, wearing them out quickly. Despite being partly converted, it was scrapped in 1990 before it could re-enter service. T4797 would serve in its converted state until withdrawal in 1982 and was cut up in 1991 at Chullora, while T4799 remained in service until the early 2000s. C3804 remained at the Elcar works on a plinth until its closure in 1994.

All four motor cars were outshopped in Tuscan red with all except C3804 later being painted in the Public Transport Commission blue and white livery. As trailer cars, T4797 and T4799 entered service in an Indian red livery, With T4799 later being repainted silver and eventually flake grey.

== Design and contracting ==
=== T4801–T4920 ===
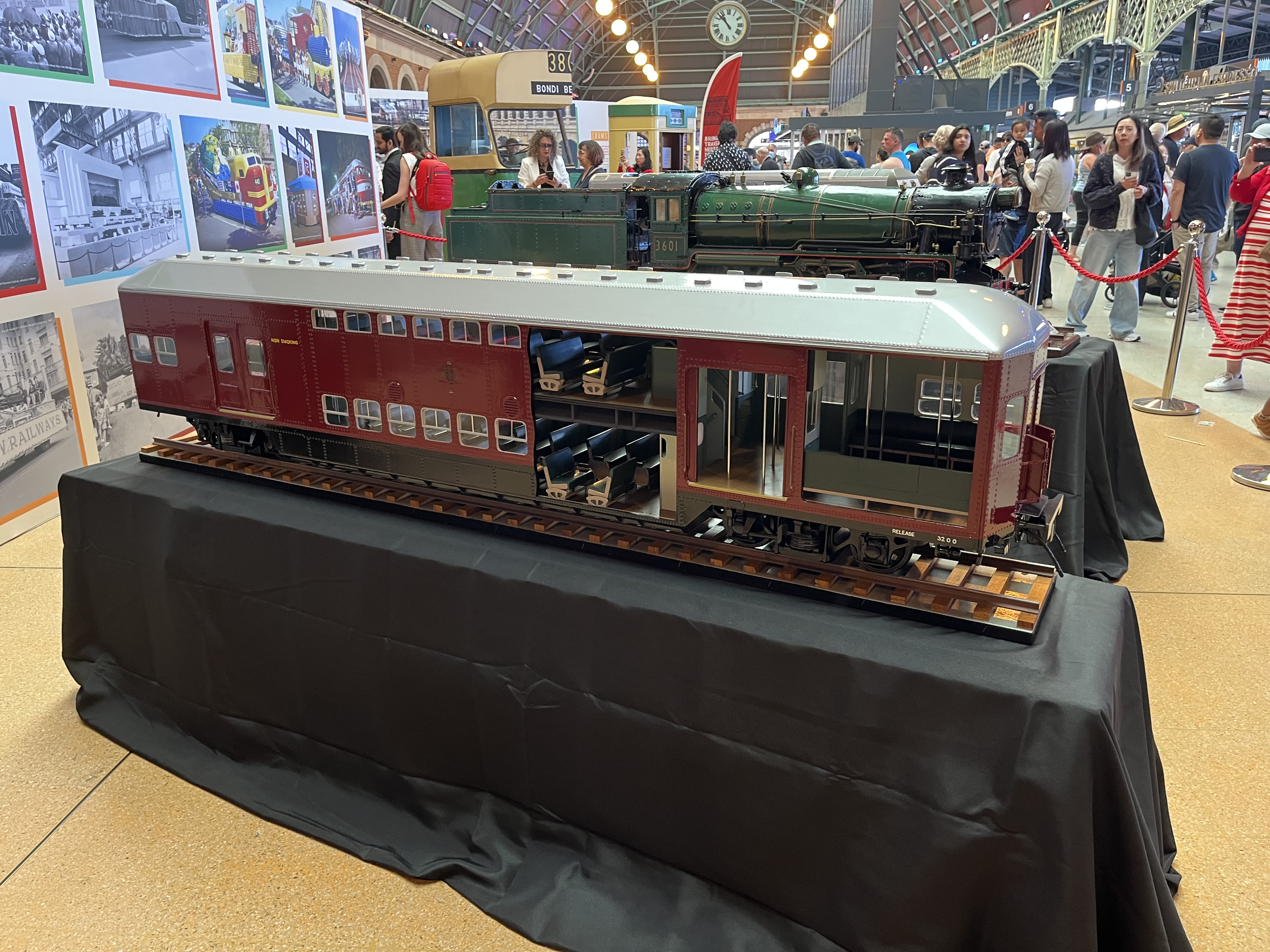
A cutaway model of a Tulloch trailer on display at the Transport Heritage Expo, Central

When tenders were called for a replacement to retire the converted timber carriages in the 1960s, the tender originally requested the construction of 120 new single deck trailers, however Tulloch Engineer, Roy Leembruggen, proposed a double deck design to several rail staff, including the then Railway Commissioner, Neal McCusker. Tulloch Limited was awarded the contract in 1962.

The Tulloch double deck carriages were given an aluminium constructed body frame. This meant that these carriages, despite the height difference, were still lighter in weight compared to the steel motor cars that they worked with.

The carriages were fitted with 40 tinted Beclawat sliding windows with the windows in the lower deck and vestibules being slightly larger. The cars had two rows of ventilators fitted to the roof to make up for the limited air-conditioning technology at the time. These were smaller than those on the single deck carriages that would haul them.

Numbers	Type	Count	Years
T4801–T4920	Trailer carriages	120	1964-1966

Notably, they also were the first carriages not just in New South Wales, but Australia as a whole to ride on airbags which improved comfort for passengers. All cars were built with vent slits in the doors and round vents in the walls with the wall vents being placed above the lower deck windows closest to the doors on T4801, those second closest to the doors on T4802–T4809, and on the third towards the middle on T4810-T4920.

=== C3801–C3804 ===
Newly built C3804 in June 1968

The power cars for the most part followed the same design as the trailer carriages, but the roof was less rounded and had a depression on the back end to make space for the pantograph to be attached. Unlike the trailer cars, the ventilators on the four motor cars served to cooldown the electrical equipment housed in the roof.

The Tulloch power cars were the last carriages in New South Wales to receive driver's windscreen sunshades. As Metropolitan-Vickers had dissolved in 1960, it was decided to give all four power cars electrical systems from different builders for evaluation purposes. For the first time, ordering electrical components from Japanese companies for three of the four prototype carriages.

Car	Traction	Bogies	Delivered	Notes
C3801	Mitsubishi	Bradford Kendall	11/09/1968	
C3802	Toshiba	Commonwealth Engineering	11/11/1968	Disk-Braked
C3803	Hitachi	Tulloch Limited	23/08/1968	
C3804	English Electric	A.E. Goodwin	23/05/1968	

C3801 would receive its electric equipment from Mitsubishi, which would later provide tractive power for all four double deck silver sets and the Tangara T sets. It used a static converter that would be providing 120 V DC auxiliary power. The power car was fitted with a cross arm pantograph, also from Mitsubishi. The bogies were provided by Bradford Kendall.

C3802 was fitted with tractive power gears from Toshiba. This resulted in the car using a solid-state voltage regulator and rectifier that was capable of 120 V DC which assisted with both control and battery charging. Fitted with Budd Pioneer III disk braking bogies supplied by Commonwealth engineering, C3802 stood out as the other motor cars had forward facing braking. The car went through two pantographs in its service life, with the first one coming from Faiveley, but it was replaced in 1975 with an airmate cross-arm type.

C3803 was equipped with propulsion control from Hitachi which would later supply electric traction to the Waratah A and B sets. This included a 120 V DC rectifier set electrical device. It also received a Mitsubishi cross arm pantograph like that of its sibling C3801. Its bogies were constructed by Tulloch Limited Themselves.

C3804 was given its traction equipment including its pantograph from English Electric of Strand, London in stark contrast to its siblings that had electrical systems supplied by Japanese companies. The car had a conventional motor generator set that provided 120 V DC. The carriage's air suspension bogeys came from A.E. Goodwin at Auburn.

== Preservation ==
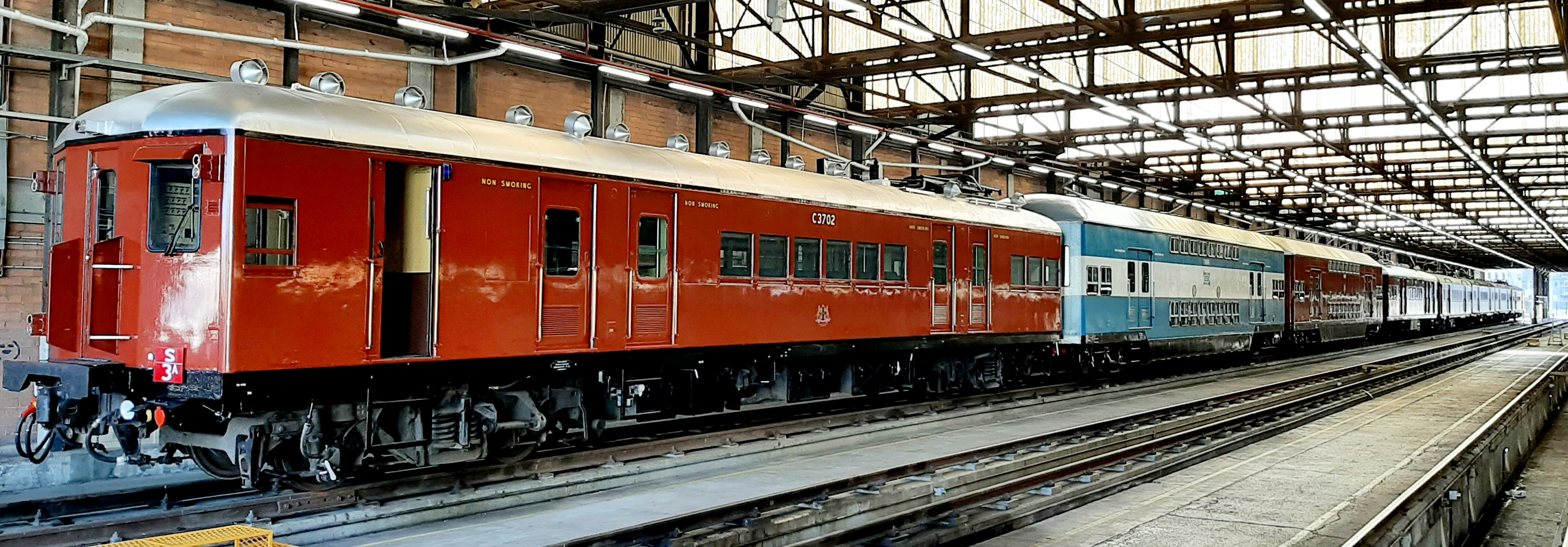
Heritage set W3 at Flemington in 2021, featuring cars T4801 and T4814

In the 1990s, the Sydney Electric Train Society (SETS) made negotiations with the State Rail Authority Officials to preserve a four car W set for rail tours on their behalf. In 1994, a four car set was formed from four carriages taken from withdrawn set W5 Punchbowl Maintenance Centre. These four cars were transferred to Redfern for storage in November 1994.

This set featured W set motor cars C3702 and C3708 and double deck trailers T4801 and T4814. T4801 is the first car in the class and the first double deck carriage built in Australia. On 8 July 1994, the set that was now targeted as "W3", ran a trial run to Campbelltown.

These cars were in SETS' custody until 1997, when some members left the group to form Historic Electric Traction (HET), who would later restore them to operational condition with all cars painted in Tuscan red with two-tone green interiors. W3 would operate rail tours until 2005 when the train went into storage due to a stricter certification process enforced after the Waterfall rail accident in 2003, which involved the fitting of new devices that the cars on W3 didn't have.

In 2013, W3 became one of three electric trains part of the heritage fleet of Transport Heritage NSW. In 2016, HET would make efforts over a five year period to return W3 to mainline charter services after the restoration of manual door single deck set F1.

When it was decided to showcase the different eras of suburban railway travel from the 1950s–1980s, each carriage was repainted in different liveries with T4801 being painted in Tuscan red to represent the early days of the carriage's service life while T4814 was repainted in the Public Transport commission Blue and White Livery with the mandarin blue being provided by the Sydney Bus Museum. W3 was finally transferred to Flemington Maintenance Centre for long term storage on 28 March 2021 by locomotive 4708. W3 has yet to run in heritage service in its post restoration condition.

Out of the four power cars, only C3804 remains. Following the closure of Elcar works, it was transferred to the NSW Rail Museum at Thirlmere, where the car resides as part of an interactive exhibit set along with Walsh Island Dockyard carriage T4310 and Eveleigh built motor carriage C3045. C3804's former S10 running trailer, T4844, was sold to the Hunter Valley Railway Trust (HVRT), which would hold it until it dissolved in 2022. T4840 is held by the Dorrigo Steam Railway and museum. SETS has trailer T4854 and converted trailer car T4799 although these are not considered part of their collection. Cars T4847 and T4877 were stored at the Petersham training centre until 2008.

The following carriages have been retained for heritage reasons:
Number	Used in	Image	Owner	Location	Status	Notes
T4799 (ex. C3803)	S sets		SETS (unofficial)	Molong, NSW	Stored	
C3804	S sets		Sydney Trains/THNSW	Thirlmere, NSW	Static display	Missing drivers controls
T4801	W sets		Sydney Trains/THNSW	Flemington, NSW	Operational	
T4814	W sets		Sydney Trains/THNSW	Flemington, NSW	Operational	
T4840	S sets		Keith Jones	Dorrigo, NSW	Under restoration	
T4844	S sets		Hunter Valley Railway Trust (formerly)	Rothbury, NSW (formerly)	Stored	
T4854	S sets		SETS (unofficial)	Unknown	Unknown	

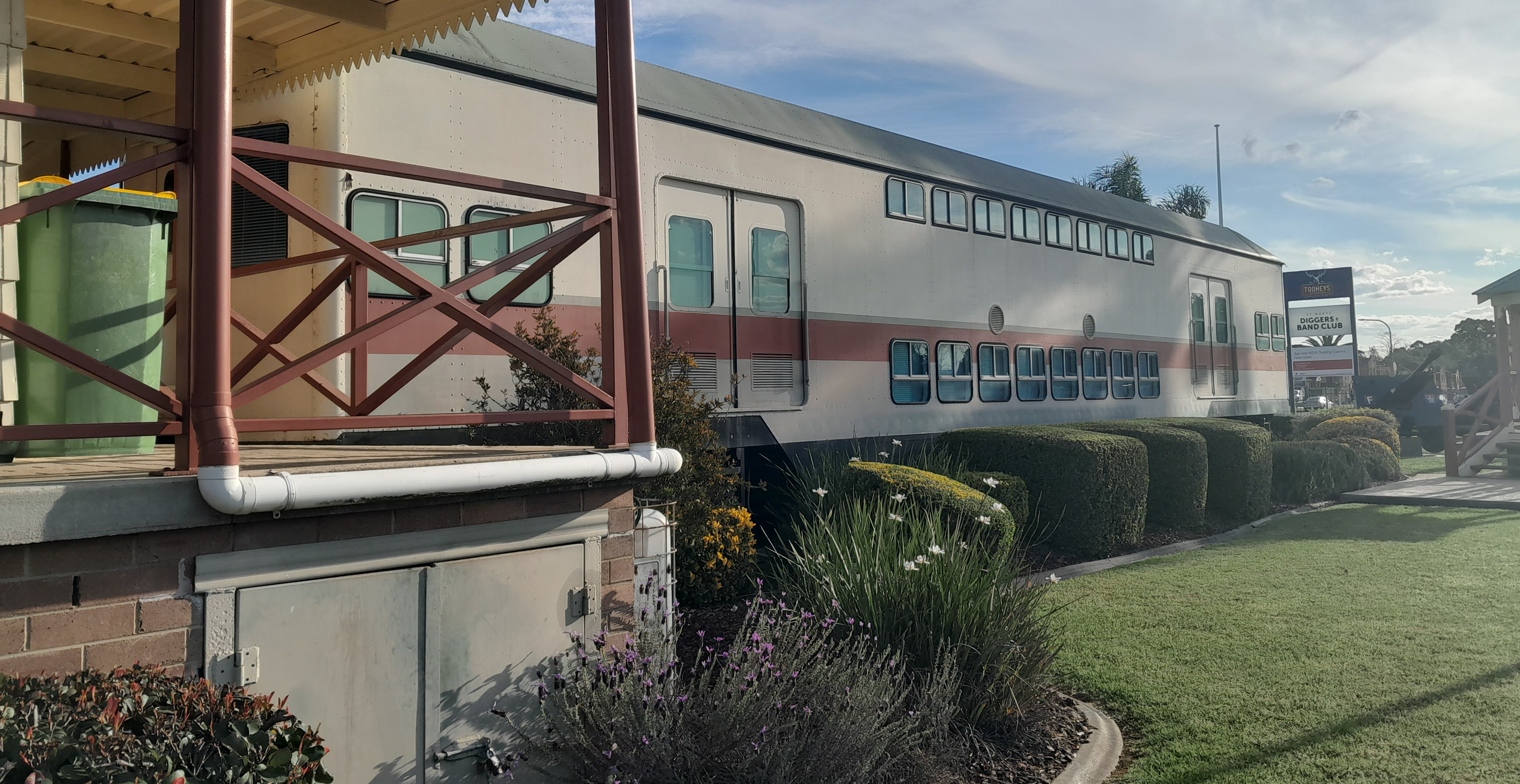
T4823 on display at the St Marys diggers club in 2025

=== Private ownership ===
Many trailer cars used in single deck sets, including T4916, the only surviving manual door double deck trailer, were sold via contract to Milfren Pty Ltd between 1993 and 1994 to private buyers. These were sold around the same time as the W set motor cars, following their retirement.

A lot of these carriages would be repurposed in a similar way to the single deck cars that were sold around the same time with some being reduced to just car bodies. One car used in the W sets, T4818 was used as a fire training vehicle at Redfern.

Cars T4810, T4820, T4825 and T4828 from the Zoo train Mk2 were all considered for conversion to work with S sets and or preservation, but both plans fell through and all were later sold off to be cut up.

One of the earlier withdrawals was T4841 due to poor condition. It was donated to the NSW Fire Brigade as a fire training vehicle after withdrawal in February 1994. One car was sold to Mario Mencingar in Coolac, however the car number is unknown.

Car Number	Used in	Date sold	Original Location	Current Location	Owner	Notes
T4803	W sets	14/03/1994	Taree, NSW	Taree, NSW (?)	Unknown (possibly Geoff Willis?)	
T4807	W sets	07/03/1994	Anna Bay, NSW	Anna Bay, NSW	Port Stephens (?)	Retains "Sesqui Train" livery
T4812	W sets	08/02/1994	Jindabyne, NSW	Jindabyne, NSW	Bungarra Alpine Centre	
T4815	W sets	13/04/1994	Wyndham, Vic	Wyndham, Vic (?)	Unknown	
T4816	W sets	28/03/1994	Wallacia, NSW	Unknown	Private	Repainted with a dark green roof and doors
T4822	W sets	06/02/1994	Jindabyne, NSW	Jindabyne, NSW	Bungarra Alpine Centre	
T4823	W sets	17/08/1993	St Marys, NSW	St Marys, NSW	St Marys Diggers Club	
T4824	W sets	11/10/1993	Trangie, NSW	Unknown (Scrapped?)	Unknown	
T4830	W sets	25/03/1994	Moree, NSW	Moree, NSW (?)	Unknown	
T4831	W sets	15/04/1994	Warialda, NSW	Warialda, NSW (?)	Unknown	
T4832	W sets	11/041994	Taree, NSW	Unknown (Scrapped?)	Unknown	
T4833	W sets	17/08/1993	Penrith, NSW	Unknown (Scrapped?)	Luddenham Vickey's Winery (formerly)	
T4857	S sets	?	Redfern, NSW (?)	Sydney, NSW	Unknown	Under restoration
T4864	S sets	?	Redfern, NSW (?)	Laverton North, Vic	Private	
T4874	S sets	?	Redfern, NSW (?)	Unknown	Unknown	
T4881	S sets	?	Redfern, NSW (?)	Molong, NSW	Unknown	
T4916	M sets	07/04/1994	Pambula, NSW	Pambula, NSW (?)	Unknown	Modified with roof vents, awnings above the door ways halfway suspended in mid-air
