= 86 class =

86 class or Class 86 may refer to:

- British Rail Class 86
- DRG Class 86
- New South Wales 86 class locomotive - electric
