= New South Wales Wooden motor carriage stock =

Australian electric multiple unit

Wooden motor carriage stock
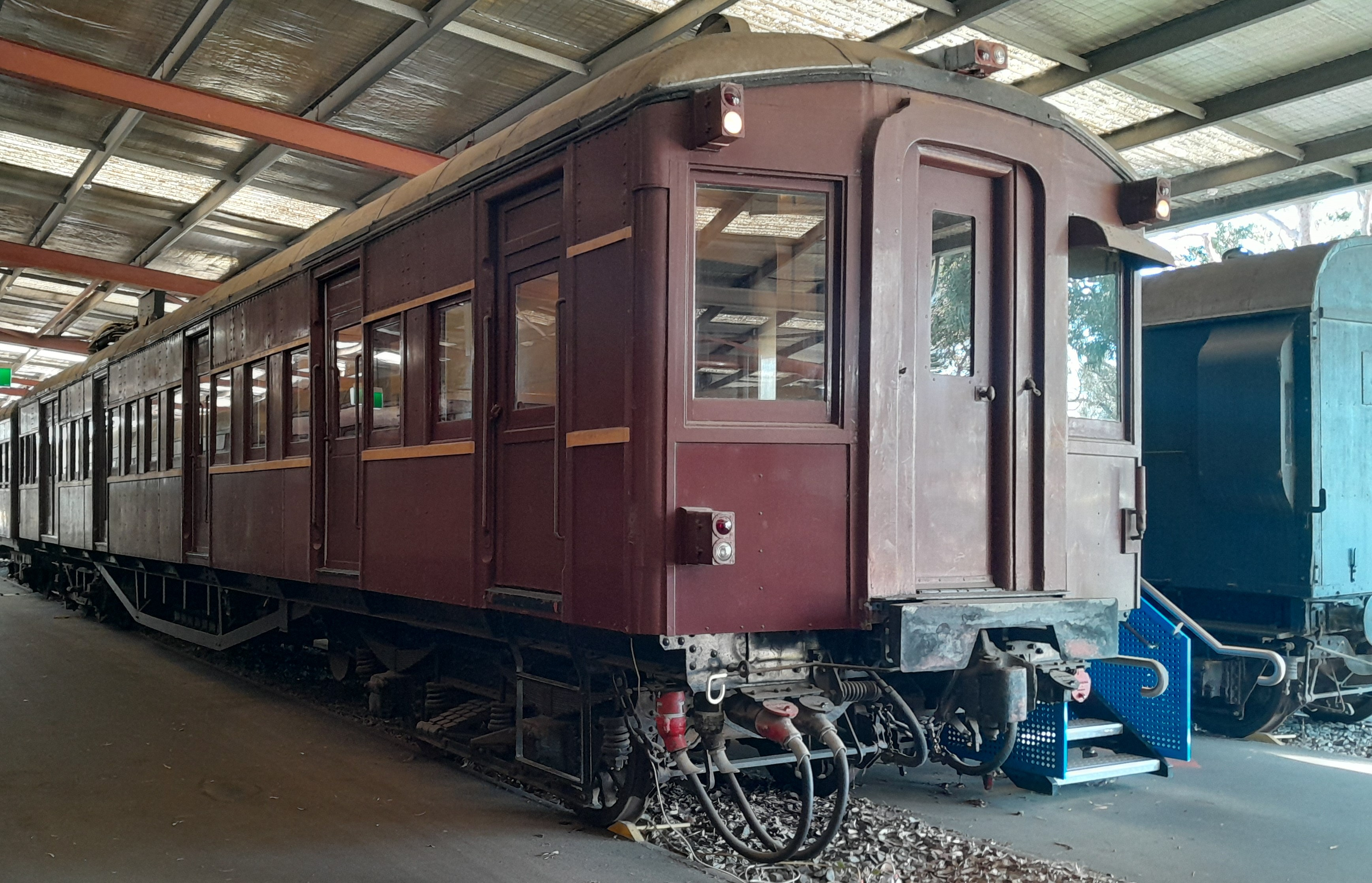
- Preserved example C3045 at the NSW Rail Museum, Thirlmere in July 2026

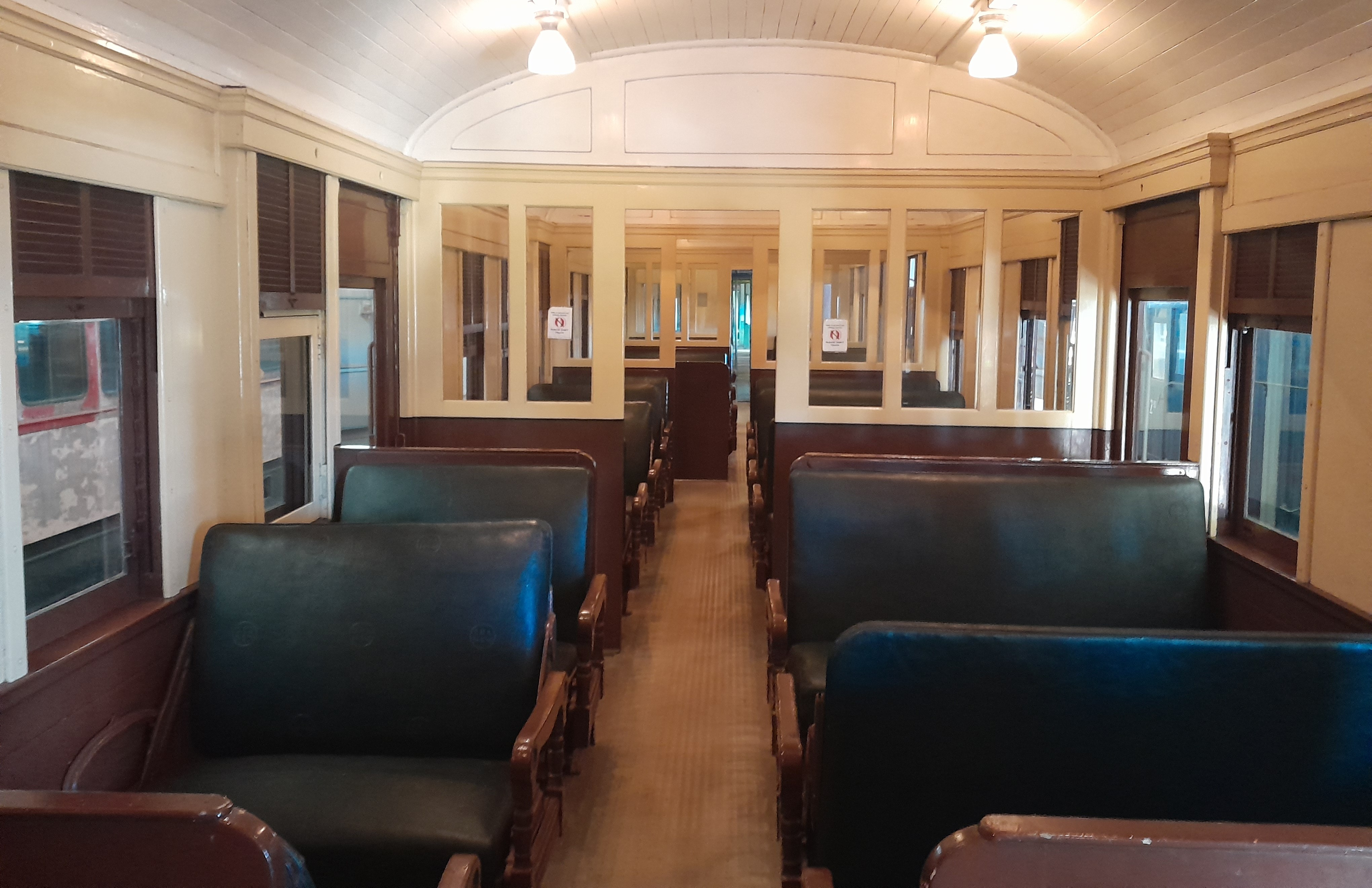
- Interior
- Stock type: Electric Multiple Unit
- In service: 1921–1975
- Manufacturers: Clyde Engineering; Ritchie Brothers; Meadowbank Manufacturing Company; Eveleigh Carriage Workshops
- Designer: E. E. Lucy
- Constructed: 1921–1922
- Number built: 101 carriages
- Number preserved: 5 carriages
- Number scrapped: 96 carriages
- Successor: S sets
- Fleet numbers: C3000-C3100
- Operators: New South Wales Government Railways; Public Transport Commission
- Depots: Flemington (in F sets); Hornsby (in H sets); Mortdale (in M sets); Punchbowl (in B sets)
- Line served: All Sydney suburban

Specifications
- Car length: 18.75 m (61 ft 6 1/4 in)
- Width: 3.180 m (10 ft 5 1/4 in)
- Height: 3.930 m (12 ft 10 3/4 in)
- Doors: Normal bodied cars: 5 manual double sliding doors on each side Rebodied cars: 4 manual double sliding doors on each side
- Wheel diameter: 42 in (1,067 mm)
- Maximum speed: 80 km/h (50 mph)
- Traction system: 2 x Metropolitan-Vickers MV172 motors per carriage, Semi automatic Electro-pneumatic resistance control, DC series wound brushed traction motors
- Power output: 2 x 270 kW (360 hp)
- Transmission: 58:18 Gear ratio. Straight cut gears.
- Electric system: 1,500 V DC catenary
- Current collection: Single-pan diamond pantograph
- Braking system: Westinghouse air
- Track gauge: 1,435 mm (4 ft 8 1/2 in) standard gauge

The New South Wales Wooden motor carriage stock are a type of electric multiple unit formerly operated by the New South Wales Government Railways and its successor, the Public Transport Commission between 1921 and 1975.

They are amongst the first electric carriages to be introduced in New South Wales along with the first 50 standard suburban carriages and are some of the oldest electric rolling stock in the world.

They gained the nickname "Bradfield carriages" or "Bradfields" after the New South Wales Railway's Chief Engineer John Bradfield, even though they were designed by Chief Mechanical Engineer Edward Lucy.

== History ==
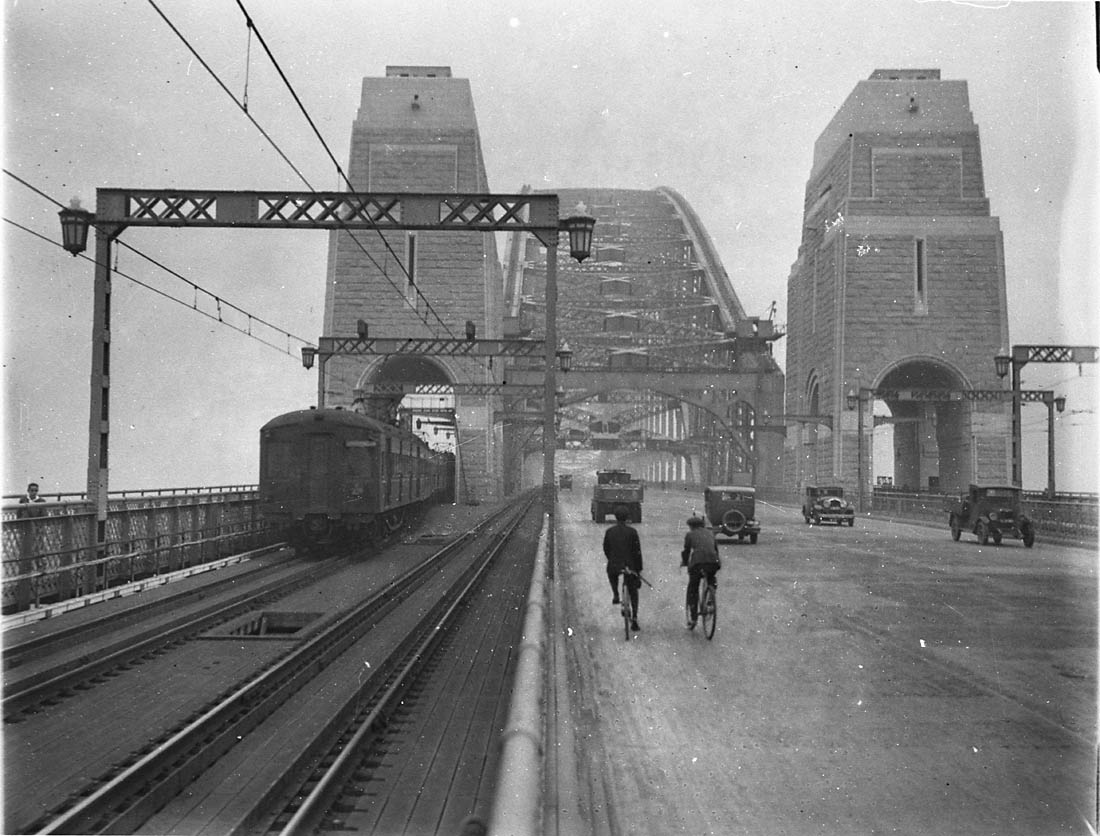

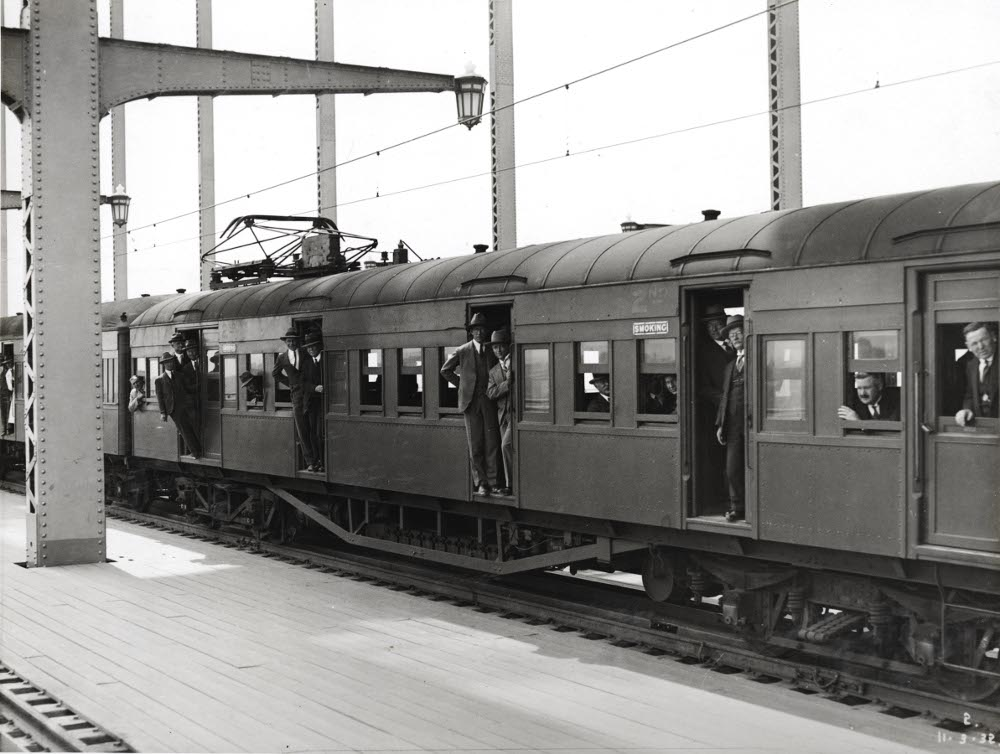
These carriages were some of the first electric train stock to cross the Sydney Harbour Bridge in 1932

With the electrification of the Sydney suburban network planned, in 1919 orders were placed for 101 carriages with contracts awarded to three builders, Clyde Engineering (42), Ritchie Brothers (18) and Meadowbank Manufacturing Company (40).

All initially entered service as locomotive hauled stock with eight seats fitted in what would later become the driver's cabin.

In preparation for the commissioning of the electrified network, the 101 newly built carriages were converted to driving motor cars at Electric Carriage Workshops, being renumbered C3000 to C3100 and operated with American Suburban stock.

In the mid-1920s, 184 American Suburban end platform carriages were converted into trailer carriages numbered T4101 to T4284, along with a further nine converted into driving trailers numbered D4001 to D4009. These carriages would become known as "Wooden trailers".

The sets were fitted with target plates on the leading and trailing power cars of each train. Every aspect of the target plate had a purpose. The target plates had a letter for the depot, a number for the set, and the colour would indicate how long the train was and whether or not it could be broken up into a smaller consist. All single deck sets were based at the Flemington, Hornsby, Mortdale, and Punchbowl depots.

Most target plates had the first letter of the depot the sets were allocated to, although Punchbowl-based sets had B instead of P on their target plates as a result of the close proximity to Bankstown at the end of suburban electrification. There were 24 sets at Hornsby, Punchbowl, and Mortdale, but 40 Sets at Flemington. Some were converted into parcel vans following on from the steel parcel vans. These were numbered C3904-C3908 later being numbered C3554-C3558.

The carriages were painted Tuscan red with yellow pin striping with brown and cream interiors. Some cars were repainted with buff lining and some in plain Tuscan red.

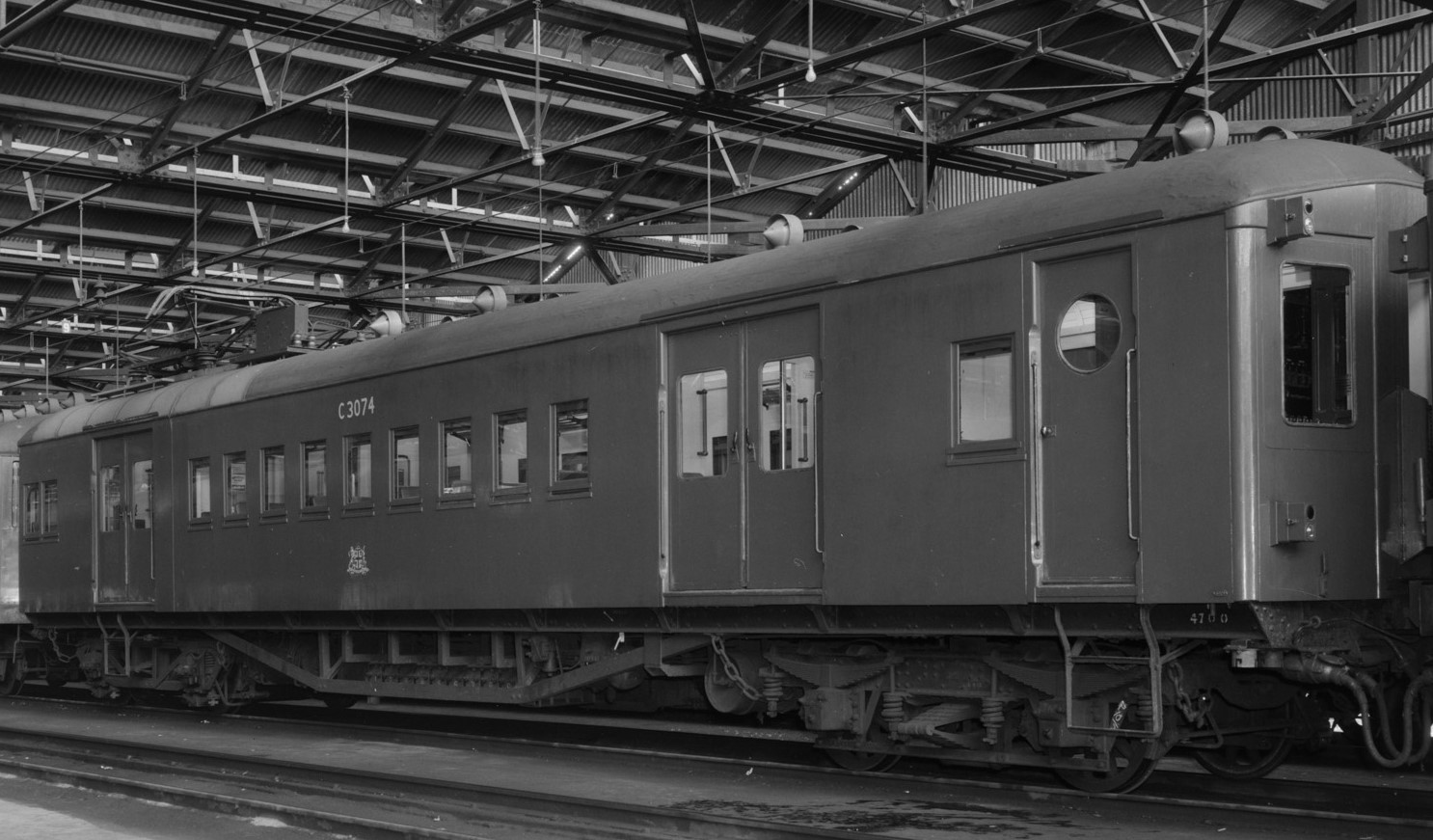
Car C3074 post rebuild in 1964

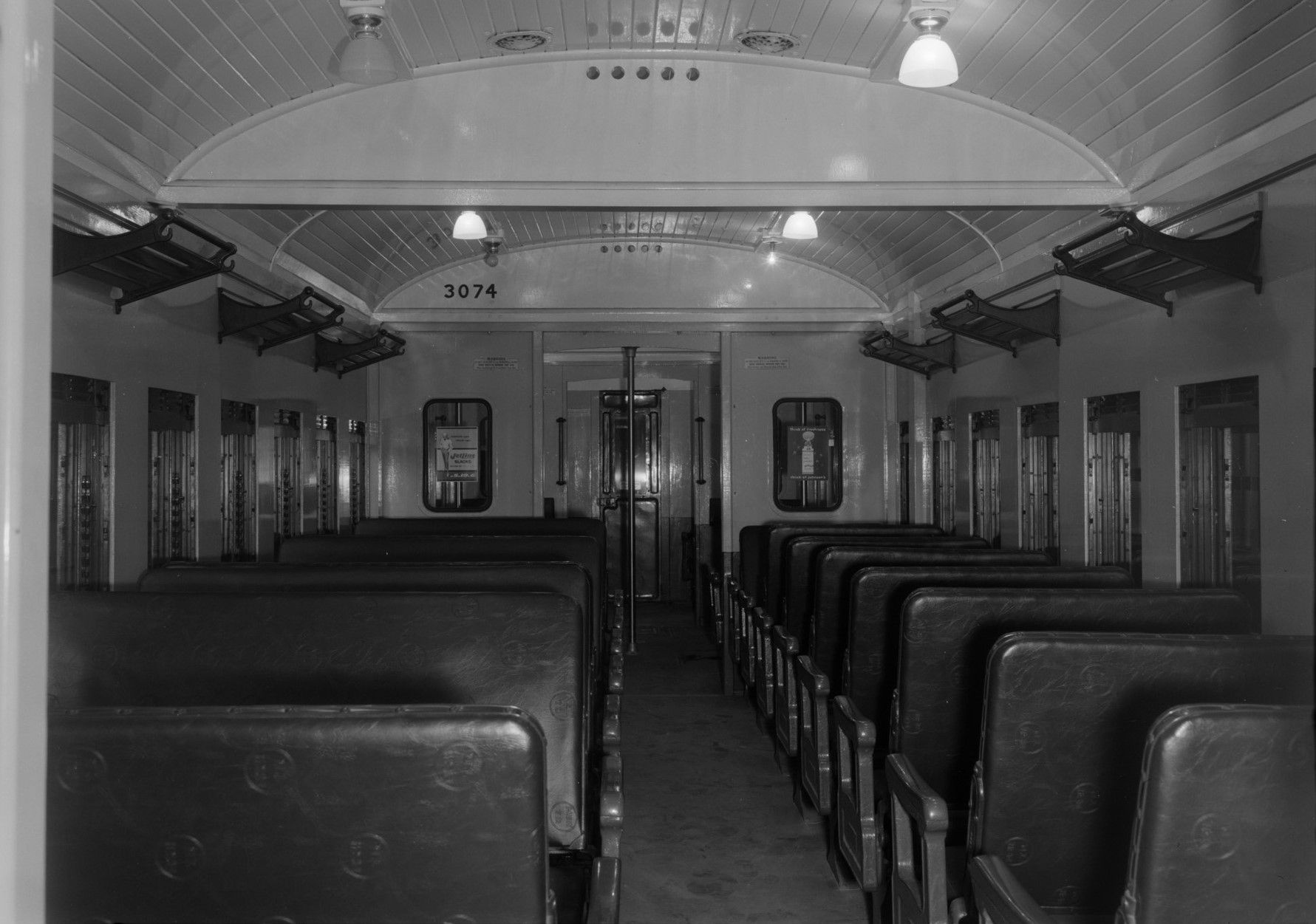
Interior

The carriages would occasionally operate in mixed train sets with the later constructed Standard and Tulloch suburban cars built in the same and following decades which came as a result of the steel constructed cars using the same electrical system. In the 1950s, some cars had their roofs replaced by Tulloch Limited at Rhodes.

In the 1960s, some carriages were rebuilt with four sets of double sliding doors, reminiscent of the standard suburban cars at the Elcar Workshops in Chullora. By 1967, 18 carriages (C3005, C3021, C3035, C3037, C3040, C3041, C3042, C3046, C3050, C3052, C3054, C3055, C3067, C3074, C3077, C3090, C3094, and C3098) were overhauled.

After the retirement of many of the wooden trailers in 1968, the motor cars would continue to work with some hauling the newer Tulloch double deck trailer cars first built in 1964.

The fleet would be withdrawn across the 1960s, but some managed to stay in service long enough to come under the operation of the Public Transport Commission. The aging carriages would remain in their Tuscan red colours and would retain their lift up windows. The last carriage to be withdrawn was C3083 in 1975.

They were replaced by the stainless steel S sets, built by Commonwealth Engineering. With the arrival of the double deck carriages from Comeng, several would be transferred to Australian Iron & Steel in Cringila and Simsmetal in Mascot for scrapping. Included in this disposal, were all 18 rebodied carriages. Cars C3001-C3080 had their numbers reused for the S set motor cars built a A Goninan & co.

== Design and refurbishments ==
The carriages were inspired by the New York City Subway cars used at the time. The carriages were all equipped with a sun shade above the drivers window. The carriages featured wooden bodies on steel underframes with 43 fitted out as EBB first class carriages and 57 as EFA second class. Despite the inspiration, the cars would end up with less doors than originally proposed with two sets of seating in the vestibule. The cars were supplied with Metropolitan-Vickers traction motors. All were delivered between January 1921 and January 1922 numbered 2112 to 2211. One further first class carriage was delivered as 2212 by the Eveleigh Carriage Workshops in January 1923.

Numbers	Builder
EBB2112–EFA2153	Clyde Engineering
EBB2154–EFA2193	Ritchie Brothers
EBB2194–EFA2211	Meadowbank Manufacturing Company
EBB2212	Eveleigh Carriage Workshops

== Preservation ==
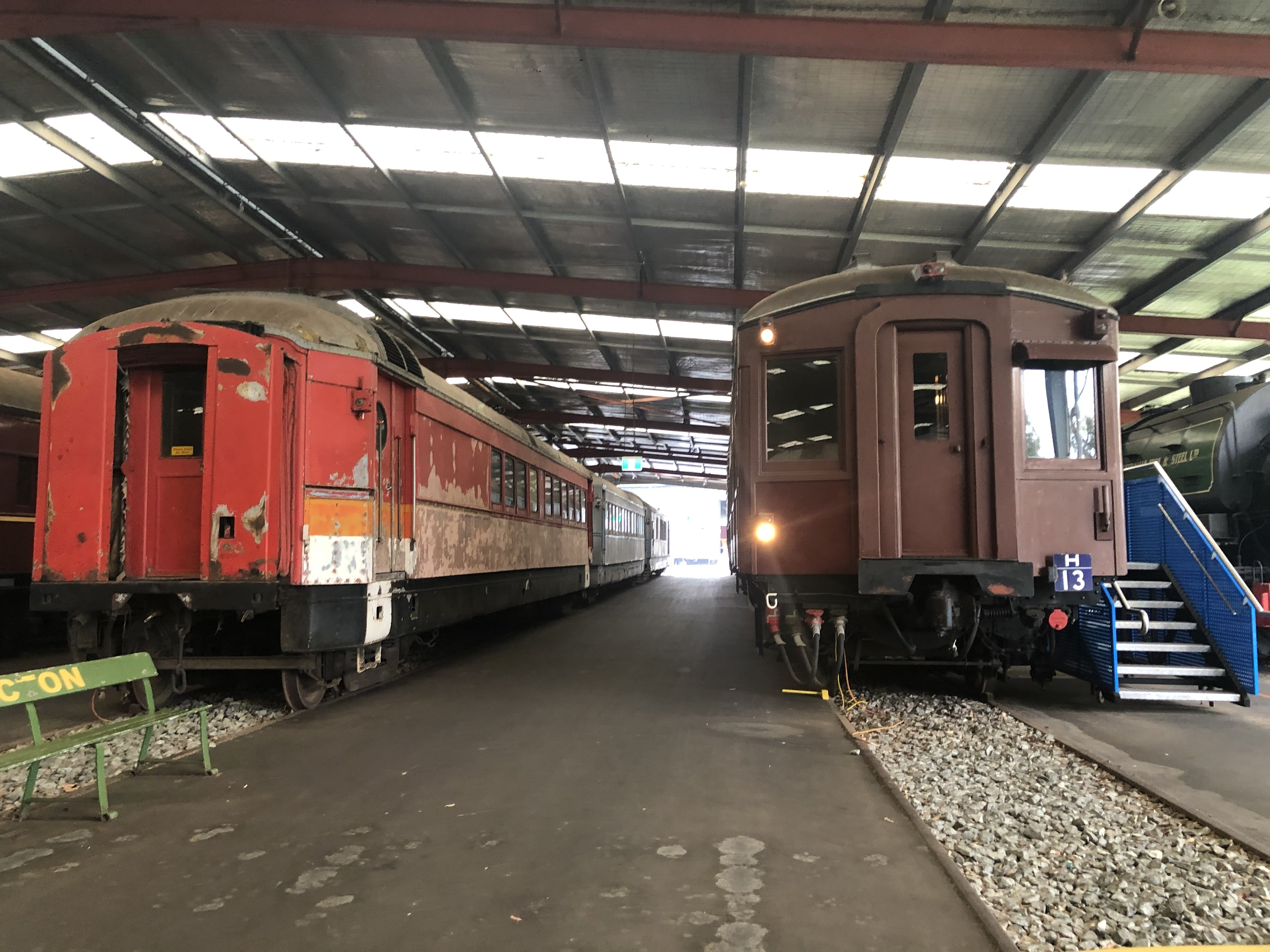
Carriage C3045 and car HFT 208 at the NSW Rail Museum in Thirlmere

Only five cars were preserved. One of these surviving examples is C3082. Withdrawn in 1965, it was preserved as it was the last surviving example in operational condition after a period of storage at the Elcar workshops.

On 19 March 1982, it would lead a charter train in celebration of the celebration of the 50th anniversary of the Sydney Harbour Bridge in a set targeted “HB50”. It is the only timber motor carriage to run in preservation.

The carriage became part of the state heritage electric collection in 1992. Both it and T4279 were only allowed to run in between two steel carriages due to having smoked wheels.

The carriage was eventually sold to the Sydney Electric Train Society (SETS) in 2008 by RailCorp with standard cars C3104 and C3444. As of 2010, all three are in undercover storage at Bilpin.

Another example is C3045. In 2005, this carriage made an appearance as a static display at Central station for the 150th anniversary of New South Wales Railways where it was coupled to surviving wooden trailer T4279, wearing a target plate with the targeting of “H13”.

The car is owned by Sydney Trains/Transport Heritage NSW and is on static display at the NSW Rail Museum, Thirlmere as part of an interactive static train set with Walsh Island Dockyard trailer T4310 and Tulloch double deck power car C3804. It remains the only carriage on static display.

The other three are motor car C3080 and cars C3661 converted from C3027, a brake test car based at Elcar works and C3662 converted from C3020 which was a profile car based at Mortdale in the 1990s. C3661 was sold for private ownership at an auction following Elcar's closure in 1994 with the other carriages being sold to the Hunter Valley Railway Trust (HVRT) with wooden trailer carriages T4186, T4224 and D4004. These cars were in undercover storage at Rothbury until HVRT dissolved in 2022.

Number	Image	Location	Manufactuer	Owner	Status	Notes
C3045 (ex. EBB2212)		NSW Rail Museum, Thirlmere, NSW	Eveleigh Carriage Workshops	Transport Heritage NSW	Static display	
C3080 (ex. EFA2172)		Unknown formerly, Rothbury, NSW	Ritchie Bros	Unknown	Stored	
C3082 (ex. EBB2166)		Bilpin, NSW	Ritchie Bros	SETS	Stored	Re-roofed by Tulloch Limited
C3661 (ex. EFA2114)		Unknown formerly Rothbury, NSW	Clyde Engineering	Private Ownership	Stored	Also numbered C3908, later C3558
C3662 (ex. EBB2182)		Unknown formerly, Rothbury, NSW	Ritchie Bros	Unknown	Stored	Also numbered C3905, Later C3555
