= New South Wales Tulloch suburban carriage stock =

Withdrawn class of electric train in New South Wales

Tulloch suburban carriage stock
- A four car train with two Tulloch built cars passing through Beecroft in 1968

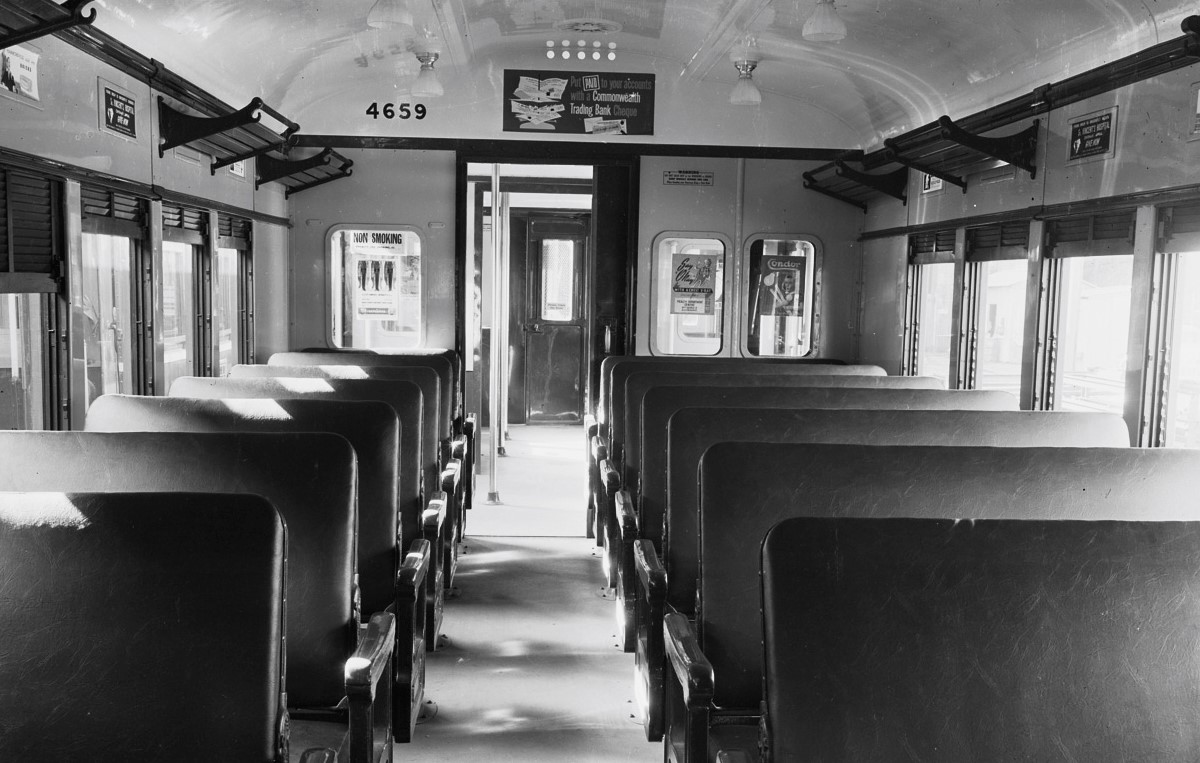
- Interior of trailer car T4659
- Stock type: Electric multiple unit (EMU)
- In service: 1940–1993
- Manufacturer: Tulloch Limited
- Built at: Rhodes
- Constructed: 1940–1957
- Number built: 74 motor cars; 129 trailer cars
- Predecessor: Wooden trailer carriages
- Successor: K sets C sets T sets
- Formation: 3, 4 and 8 carriages
- Fleet numbers: C3453–C3526; T4543–T4671
- Operators: New South Wales Government Railways; Public Transport Commission; State Rail Authority; CityRail
- Depots: Flemington (in F sets); Hornsby (in H sets); Mortdale (in M sets); Punchbowl (in B sets)
- Line served: All Sydney suburban except Eastern Suburbs

Specifications
- Car length: 19.098 m (62 ft 7.9 in)
- Width: 3,189 mm (10 ft 5.6 in)
- Doors: 4 manual double sliding doors on each side
- Wheel diameter: 3000 series cars: 42 in (1,100 mm); 7000 series cars: 37 in (940 mm)
- Maximum speed: 3000 series cars: 80 km/h (50 mph) (designed speed); 7000 series cars: 113 km/h (70 mph) (designed speed)
- Traction system: 3000 series cars: 2 x Metropolitan-Vickers MV172 motors per carriage 7000 series cars: 4 x AEI149AZ motors per carriage Semi automatic electro-pneumatic resistance control, Series wound DC traction motors
- Transmission: 3000 series cars: 58:18 Gear ratio. Straight cut gears. 7000 series cars: 74:17 Gear ratio. helical gears.
- Power supply: 36 v DC
- Electric system: 1,500 V DC catenary
- Current collection: Single-pan diamond pantograph
- Braking systems: Westinghouse, air
- Track gauge: 1,435 mm (4 ft 8 1/2 in) standard gauge

The Tulloch suburban carriage stock are a type of electric multiple unit formerly operated by the New South Wales Government Railways and its successors between 1940 and 1993, serving the Sydney suburban network. They were nicknamed Tullochs after their Manufacturer by enthusiasts.

In their later years, they, along with the Standard and Sputnik stock, were nicknamed "Red Rattlers". The term was borrowed from Melbourne, originally referencing the Tait trains. They were also known as 1940 type carriages.

== History ==
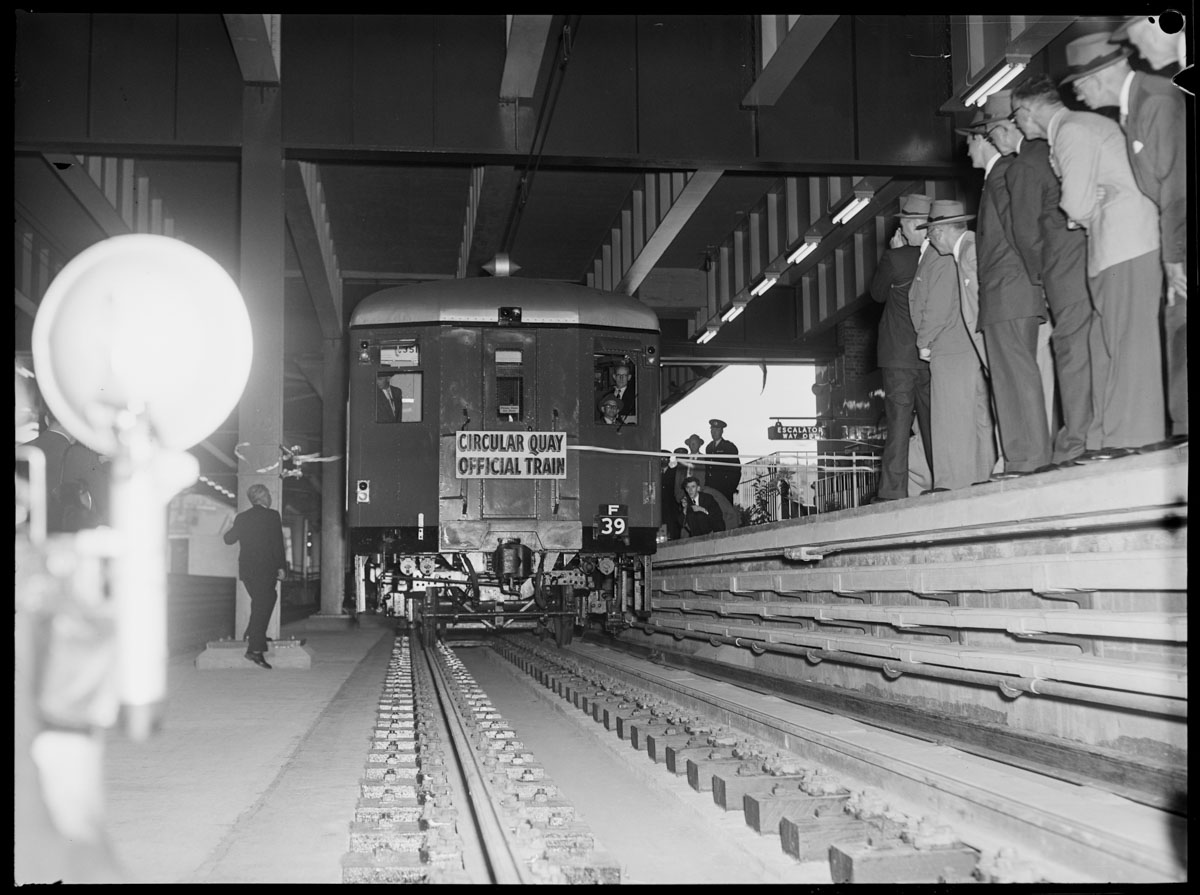
Opening of Circular Quay Station, with set F39 led by Tulloch motor carriage C3519

In 1940, 24 first series power cars and 24 trailer cars were built by Tulloch Limited for the New South Wales Government Railways.

They were built as a response to help run the newly electrified East Hills line and the opening of the Cronulla line in 1939.

Due to the higher passenger loads and further lines having been opened, the operating suburban trains proved to be insufficient for the network and so more trains had to be commissioned.

The next batch were not built for another 11 years due to a shortage in steel following World War II. In 1951, a further three first series power cars were delivered, followed between May 1952 and March 1956 by 47 second series power cars, Between July 1950 and October 1957, 105 trailer cars were built.

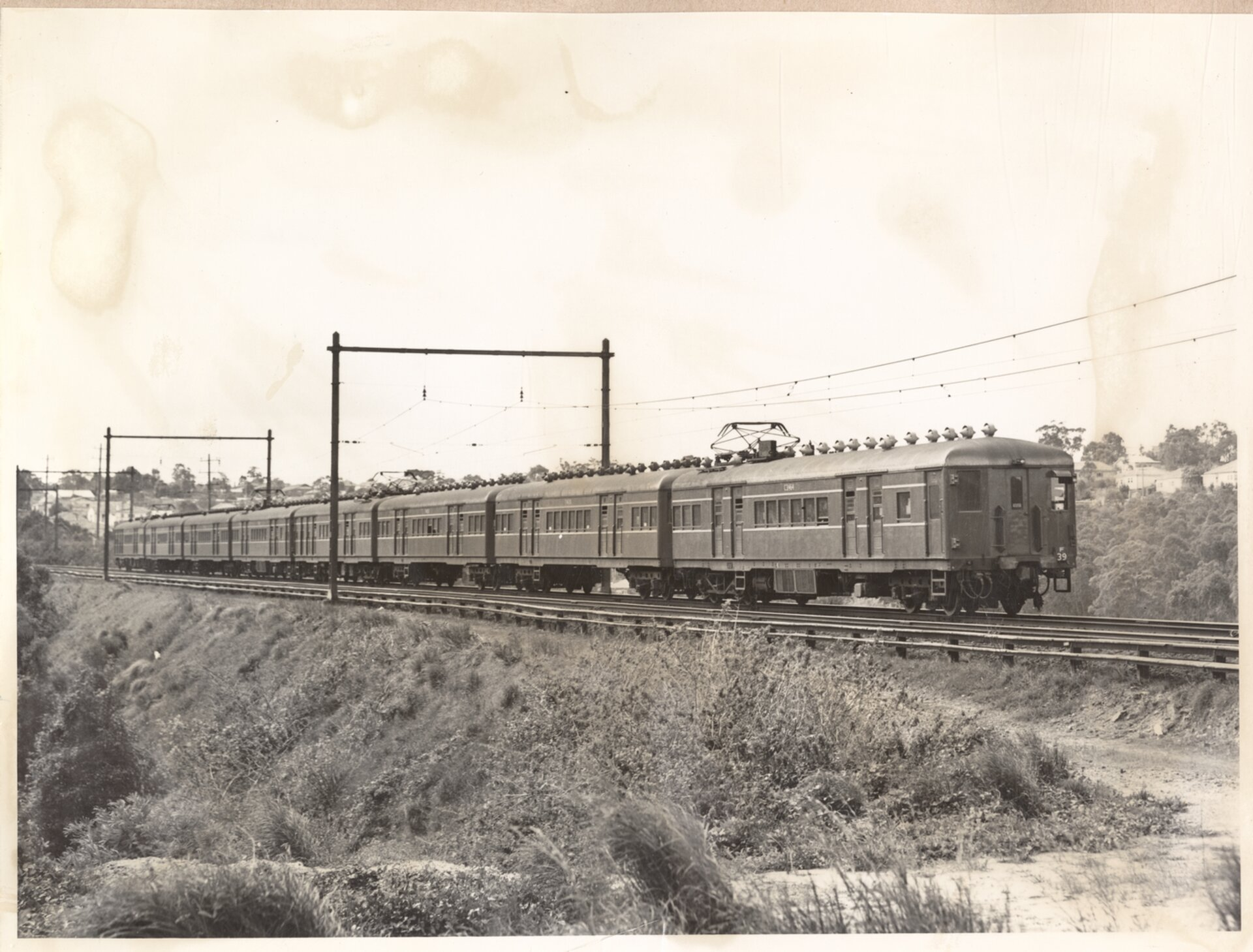
Set "F39" on its run to Circular Quay, 1956

They operated in sets with the 1920s built steel carriages along with the timber carriages built earlier the same decade across the Sydney suburban network.

These carriages would use the same targeting system as the previously built suburban carriages. All Standard, Wooden, and Tulloch cars were allocated to the depots at Hornsby, Mortdale, Punchbowl, and Flemington.

Due to safety concerns about the manual doors, it was decided to take eight carriages plus two spares and fit them with powered doors. These motor cars were C3464, C3469 and C3519-C3521 while the trailers were T4630-T4634. The eight of these cars were put into a set targeted as "F39" entered service on 10 January 1956. F39 was last in service in August 1976.

When the first Tulloch double deck carriages were built in 1964, Only two double deck cars would be thrown into four car sets until further trails showed that the older motor carriages could handle the heavier passenger loads.

Between 1968 and 1975, 52 power cars (C3453, C3457, C3459, C3465, C3474–C3477, C3480–C3518 and C3522–C3526) were converted to 4 motors using traction equipment similar to the W sets and U sets and were fitted with two motor air suspended bogies with all having their numbers increased by 4000.

Between 1967 and 1980, some trailer cars would be renumbered and some would become driving trailers. The renumbered cars were T4579 which became T4617 and T4679 in July 1980, and T4586 which would be renumbered T4468 in May 1988. The cars that were converted into driving trailers were T4571, T4578, T4591 and T4593 which were all converted into driving trailers numbered D4057–D4060 before later renumbered again in November 1976 as D4675–D4678.

Originally painted Tuscan red, from 1973 they were repainted in the Public Transport Commission blue and white livery before the livery was changed to Indian red in 1976. The interiors were painted in two-tone green, but not all cars were repainted. In 1984, a trio of three car sets as well as one back up train were chosen to run from Carlingford and Clyde. These were targeted Y1-Y3, which would have a mix of Standard and Tulloch cars.

Overhauls of the stock continued up until 1988, with some receiving sliding aluminium Beclawat windows to alleviate rust problems. Withdrawals commenced in the 1980s, with 94 remained in service with CityRail in July 1991.

In March 1991, carriages C7491, T4603, T4662 and C3468 on set "H22" were repainted in different animal themed liveries to advertise Toronga Zoo, with C7491 repainted as 'The Fish', T4603 as 'The Leopard', T4662 as 'The Bird', and C3468 as 'The Snake'. This set was dubbed the "Zoo Train".

The final passenger service with Tulloch motor carriages was with four car Mortdale set "M40" (C7465, T4834, T4900 and C7512) on the Carlingford line which ran 22 January 1993. Cars C3501-C3526 would have their numbered recycled for the double deck K set motor cars built by A Goninan & Co.

These cars would be disposed of at various places along with other single deck suburban cars throughout the 1990s. Some carriages were converted into yellow depot shunters before retirement. Several carriages have been preserved.

== Construction ==
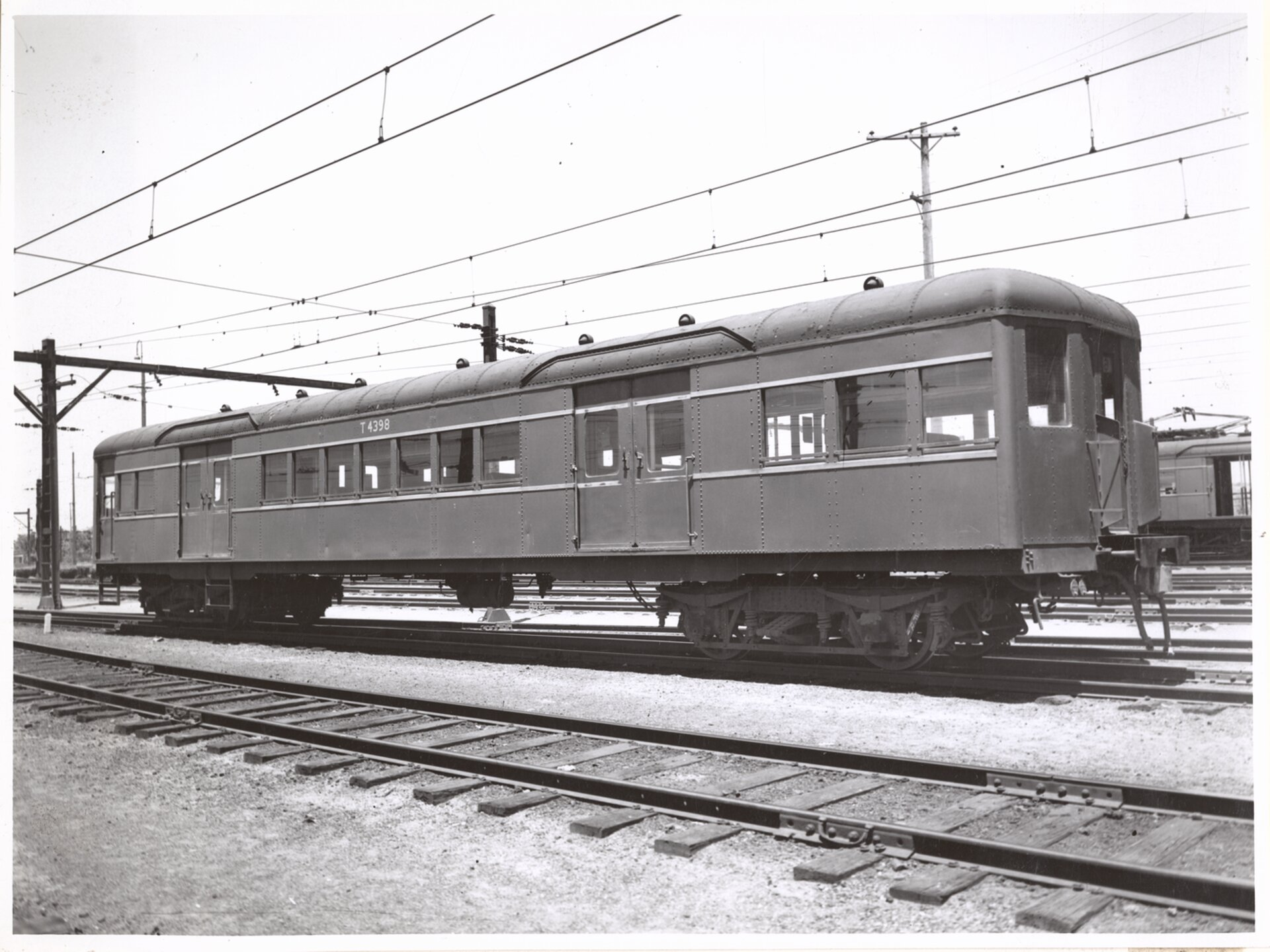
Standard carriage

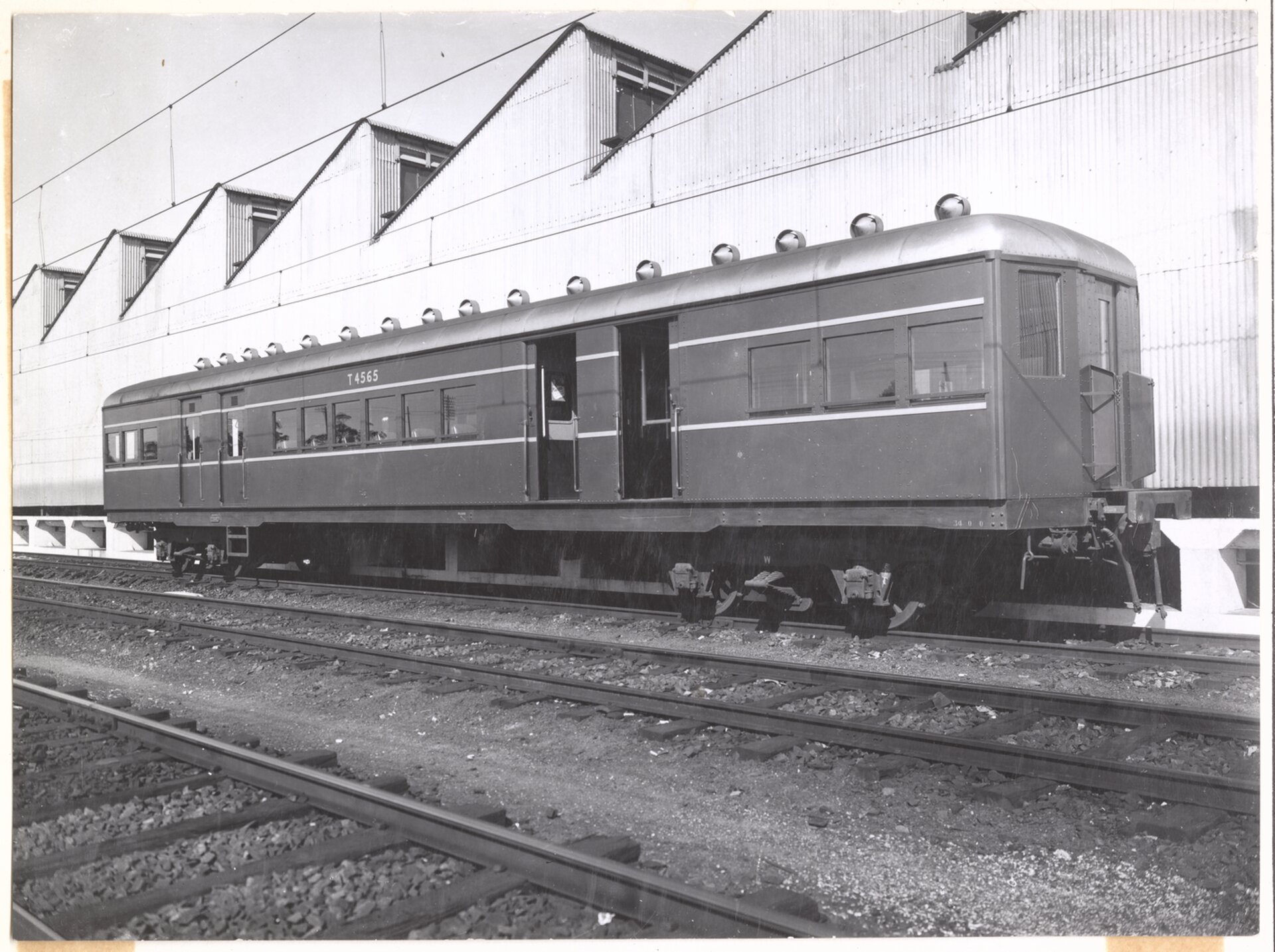
Tulloch carriage

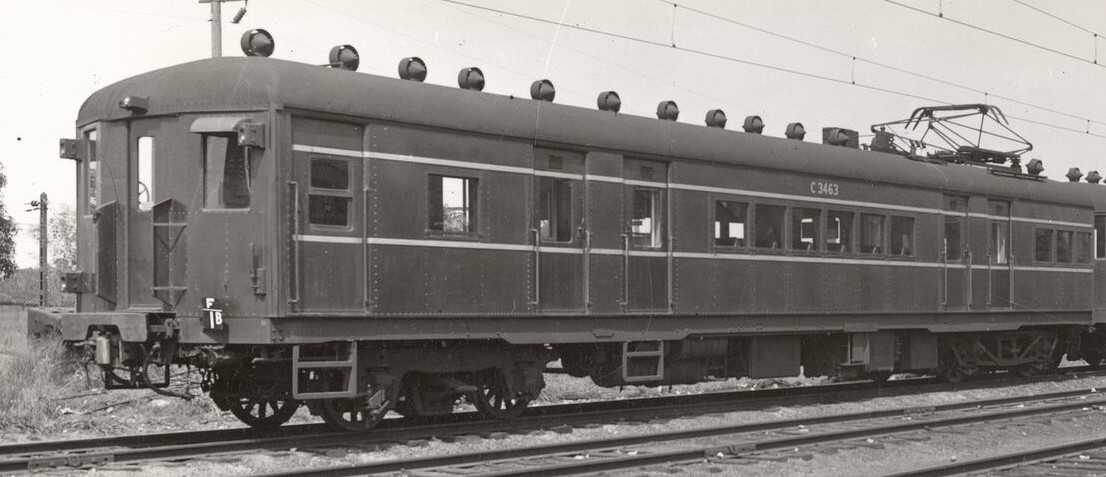
Small crew compartment

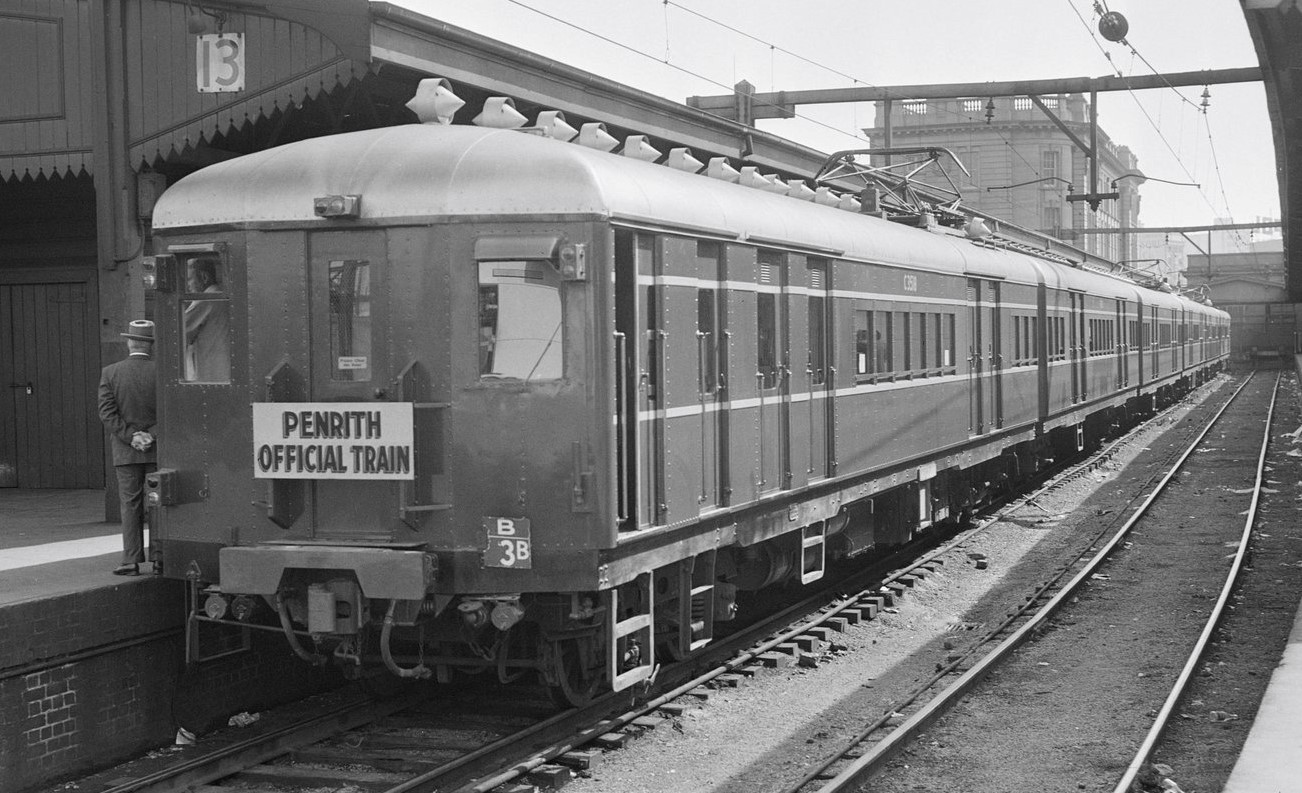
Large crew compartment

By the 1930s, Australia had plenty of experience in steel carriage building with the construction of many suburban cars built between 1926 and 1937 by both Walsh Island Dockyard and Clyde Engineering and so it was decided that the next suburban trains would built locally.

Similarly to the standard stock built in the mid-1920s and late 1930s, the Tullochs were built using riveting to hold the car body together. These cars also differed from the 1920s built carriages in having a pillar between the doors to increase passenger circulation space.

This feature would also be included in the suburban single deck cars built by Commonwealth Engineering later in the same decade as the last of the Tulloch built cars.

In addition to the spacing out of the passenger doors, a crew compartment door was installed on both sides of the power car, while the standard carriages were originally built with only one on the left-hand side. The second batch of motor cars onward featured an enlarged guard's compartment. The cars with larger guard's compartments could identified by the extra door on the left hand side of the car between the passenger and cab door.

These cars also featured longitudinal seating in the vestibules, which some of the standard cars were fitted with at a later date during refurbishment. Most of the power cars were fitted with sun shades above the driver and guard's windows. The Tulloch carriages were very similar to the previously built suburban cars aside from this aforementioned pillar and extra crew compartment door.

Numbers	Years Built	Total	Notes
C3453–C3476	1940	24	1st series
C3477–C3479	1951	3	1st series
C3480–C3526	1952–1956	47	2nd series
T4543–T4566	1940	24	
T4567–T4671	1950–1957	105	

These also had a row of ventilators on the roof, as there were not many ways to keep the carriages cool in hot weather. These were larger than those on the standard and timber carriages.

This design choice would be used for all future single deck trains, both suburban and interurban. Like the previously built standard suburban carriages and wooden stock, the Tulloch carriages were supplied with tractive equipment from Metropolitan-Vickers with two motors placed on the bogie below the pantograph.

Because of the doors being manually operated, passengers often would leave the doors open on warm days to make up for the lack of proper air conditioning.

== Preservation ==
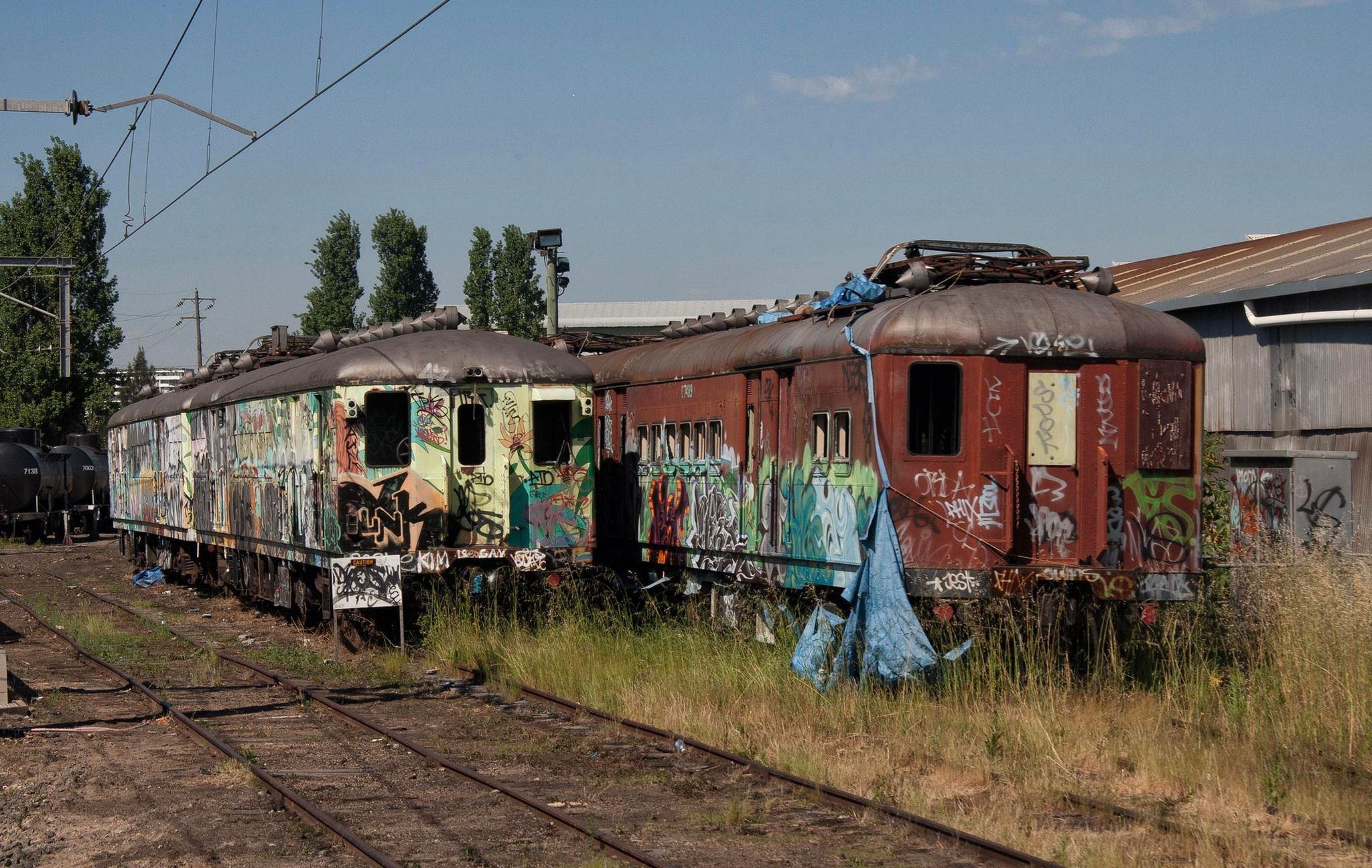
Tulloch motor carriage C7489 with Sputnik motor cars C3714 and C3725 at Meeks Road in 2008

Following the end of manual door single deck service on the suburban network, The Sydney Electric Train Society (SETS) made efforts to secure a collection of carriages for mainline tour runs on behalf of the State Rail Authority. By late 1993, they had managed the preservation of 15 carriages which had all been stored across the maintenance centres of Mortdale, Punchbowl and Hornsby. Two of the cars at Punchbowl were 7000 series post-war motor car C7485 and pre-war trailer T4554. These two cars, with 7000 series Clyde Engineering carriage C7396, were formed into what was known as set "B1". T4554 is notably the only preserved Pre-war Tulloch trailer.

The heritage carriages were transferred from Punchbowl shed to Redfern in November 1994 with C7396 and a four car heritage set that would eventually become W3. In 1997, SETS would go to embark on becoming owners of their own rolling stock, resulting in some members leaving the group and creating Historic Electric Traction to become the subsequent caretakers of the SRA owned heritage cars.

In 2001 C7485 was repainted in the Public Transport Commission blue and white livery by HET painters as a way to cover up graffiti. It was also used as a part donor for C7396. While plans were made to sell the car as it had been taken off of the SRA preservation list, this never happened. T4554 was planned to be restored to traffic in set F1. As of the early 2020s, the car currently remains in a grey undercoat. In 2013, these cars along with the rest of the government owned heritage electric carriages would fall into the ownership of Transport Heritage NSW. These cars are now both planned for restoration to traffic.

SETS would take four 7000 series post-war motor cars C7489, C7510, C7512, and C7513. These carriages were purchased off of The government from Flemington Maintenance Centre between 9 September 1998 and 11 November 1999 with all having been reverted to motor cars from yellow shunting units C3664 and C3666-C3668.

All carriages, with the exception of C7510, were transferred for storage in a siding at Meeks Road from 1999 to 2000 with W set motor cars C3714 and C3725 that were acquired in November 1998 under a monthly $100 rent agreement, becoming known as the "Meeks Road cars". All carriages were planned for restoration to operational status, but work to restore any of these assets to working order was quickly undermined by elemental deterioration and damage from vandals.

Eventually in 2009, these carriages were transferred to a Chullora siding where they have remained since. Two more cars were purchased at a Cataract Scout Park public auction on 24 November 1998, although these are not part of the official SETS collection. These are trailer car T4609 and motor car C7465, the latter of which was reverted back from yellow shunting unit C3663.

The following carriages have been retained for heritage reasons:
Number	Location	Owner	Status	Notes
C7465 (ex. C3465)	Cranebrook, NSW	SETS (Unofficial)	Stored	
C7485 (ex. C3485)	Redfern, NSW	Transport Heritage NSW / Sydney Trains	Under restoration	
C7489 (ex. C3489)	Chullora, NSW	SETS	Stored	
C7510 (ex. C3510)	Castlereagh, NSW	SETS	Stored	Kept as a spare for equipment storage
C7512 (ex. C3512)	Chullora, NSW	SETS	Stored	
C7513 (ex. C3513)	Chullora, NSW	SETS	Stored	
T4554	Redfern, NSW	Transport Heritage NSW / Sydney Trains	Under restoration	
T4609	Molong, NSW	SETS (Unofficial)	Stored	

C7522 at the Thomas Acres Public School in November 2026

=== Privately owned carriages ===
Many cars, including C3460, the last remaining 3000 series motor car, were sold via contract to Milfren Pty Ltd from 1992 to 1993 to private buyers.

Usually this would only include the body of the carriage, lacking pantographs and bogies, however there are some exceptions to these.

One of these cars, C7497 was sold to a private owner in Mona Vale on On 25 May 1992. It was later destroyed by the Sydney bushfires of January 1994.

Car Number	Date Sold	Original Location	Current Location	Owner	Notes
C7459 (ex. C3459)	01/04/1992	Dubbo, NSW	Unknown	Unknown	
C3460	15/05/1992	West Wyalong, NSW	Unknown	Unknown	
C7474 (ex. C3474)	22/04/1992	Dubbo, NSW	Unknown	Unknown	
C7486 (ex. C3486)	01/06/1992	Narromie, NSW	Unknown	Unknown	
C7487 (ex. C3487)	27/04/1993	Belconnen, NSW	Gloucester, NSW	Unknown	
C7488 (ex. C3488)	17/03/1993	Stuart Town, NSW	Unknown	Unknown	
C7490 (ex. C3490)	30/10/1992	Running Stream, NSW	Unknown	Unknown	
C7491 (ex. C3491)	30/09/1992	Camden, NSW	Unknown	Unknown	
C7492 (ex. C3492)	07/08/1992	Eromanga, Qld	Unknown	Unknown	
C7493 (ex. C3493)	25/09/1992	Lightning Ridge, NSW	Unknown	Unknown	
C7496 (ex. C3496)	21/09/1992	Bredbo, NSW	Bredbo, NSW	Paddington Hills Rural Retreat	
C7499 (ex. C3499)	24/07/1992	Murwillumbah, NSW	Unknown	Unknown	
C7500 (ex. C3500)	29/06/1993	South Grafton, NSW	Unknown	Unknown	
C7501 (ex. C3501)	10/07/1992	Oberon, NSW	Unknown	Unknown	
C7502 (ex. C3502)	07/12/1992	Lightning Ridge, NSW	Unknown	Unknown	
C7505 (ex. C3505)	05/07/1992	Condoblin, NSW	Unknown	Unknown	
C7506 (ex. C3506)	17/09/1992	Lightning Ridge, NSW	Unknown	Unknown	
C7508 (ex. C3508)	02/04/1993	Penrith, NSW	Unknown	Unknown	
C7509 (ex. C3509)	22/04/1993	Bredbo, NSW	Unknown	Unknown	
C7511 (ex. C3511)	19/03/1993	Lightning Ridge, NSW	Unknown	Unknown	
C7514 (ex. C3514)	07/07/1993	Londonderry, NSW	Unknown	Unknown	
C7516 (ex. C3515)	12/08/1992	Townsville, Qld	Unknown	Unknown	
C7517 (ex. C3517)	23/09/1992	Bega, NSW	Between Cobargo and Bega, NSW	Unknown	
C7518 (ex. C3518)	16/02/1993	Orange, NSW	Unknown	Unknown	
C7522 (ex. C3522)	22/06/1993	Campbelltown, NSW	Ambarvale, NSW	Thomas Acres Public School	
C7523 (ex. C3523)	02/07/1992	Lightning Ridge, NSW	Unknown	Unknown	
C7524 (ex. C3524)	04/05/1993	Mudgee, NSW	Unknown	Unknown	
C7525 (ex. C3525)	11/05/1993	Alstoneville, NSW	Unknown	Unknown	
C7526 (ex. C3526)	29/04/1993	Orange, NSW	Unknown	Unknown	
T4468 (ex. T4586)	20/04/1992	Goologong, NSW	Unknown	Unknown	
D4677 (ex. T4593)	30/11/1992	Murwillumbah, NSW	Unknown	Unknown	
T4599	23/03/1992	Bredbo, NSW	Unknown	Unknown	
T4600	06/04/1992	North Dubbo, NSW	Unknown	Unknown	Damaged in the Sydenham train collision of 19/12/1953
T4602	22/01/1992	Dubbo, NSW	Unknown	Unknown	
T4603	24/08/1992	Lightning Ridge, NSW	Unknown	Unknown	
T4604	26/03/1992	Lightning Ridge, NSW	Unknown	Unknown	
T4605	24/06/1992	Singleton, NSW	Unknown	Unknown	
T4606	19/05/1992	Mandurama, NSW	Unknown	Unknown	
T4607	23/03/1992	Bredbo, NSW	Unknown	Unknown	
T4612	30/10/1992	Running Strm, NSW	Unknown	Unknown	
T4615	10/04/1992	Gulgong, NSW	Hunter Valley, NSW	Little Valley Farm	
T4616	14/01/1992	Wallacia, NSW	Unknown	Unknown	
T4618	28/04/1992	Dubbo, NSW	Unknown	Unknown	
T4619	16/04/1992	Dubbo, NSW	Unknown	Unknown	
T4620	28/05/1992	Warren, NSW	Unknown	Unknown	
T4621	13/04/1992	Wagga Wagga, NSW	Unknown	Unknown	
T4622	05/08/1992	Bathurst, NSW	Unknown	Unknown	
T4623	27/02/1992	Sallys Flats, NSW	Unknown	Unknown	
T4624	21/10/1992	Rylstone, NSW	Unknown	Unknown	
T4625	06/05/1992	Wollongong, NSW	Unknown	Unknown	
T4626	27/05/1992	Peats Ridge, NSW	Unknown	Unknown	
T4627	14/02/1992	Rockley NSW	Unknown	Unknown	
T4636	12/05/1992	Dubbo, NSW	Unknown	Unknown	
T4637	16/04/1992	Mulgoa, NSW	Unknown	Unknown	
T4641	05/02/1992	Braidwood, NSW	Unknown	Unknown	
T4643	07/05/1992	Orange, NSW	Unknown	Unknown	
T4649	26/11/1992	Dubbo, NSW	Unknown	Unknown	
T4661	30/04/1992	Hazelgrove, NSW	Unknown	Unknown	
T4662	19/08/1992	Crowther, NSW	Unknown	Unknown	
T4665	03/09/1992	Davidson, NSW	Mudgee Hills, NSW	Riparide	
T4666	?	Unknown	Near Couridjah, NSW	Tharawal aboriginal mission (formerly)	
T4667	16/01/1992	Dubbo, NSW	Unknown	Unknown	
T4668	12/06/1992	Mossgiel, NSW	Unknown	Unknown	
