= New South Wales 86 class locomotive =

Class of electric locomotives

New South Wales 86 class
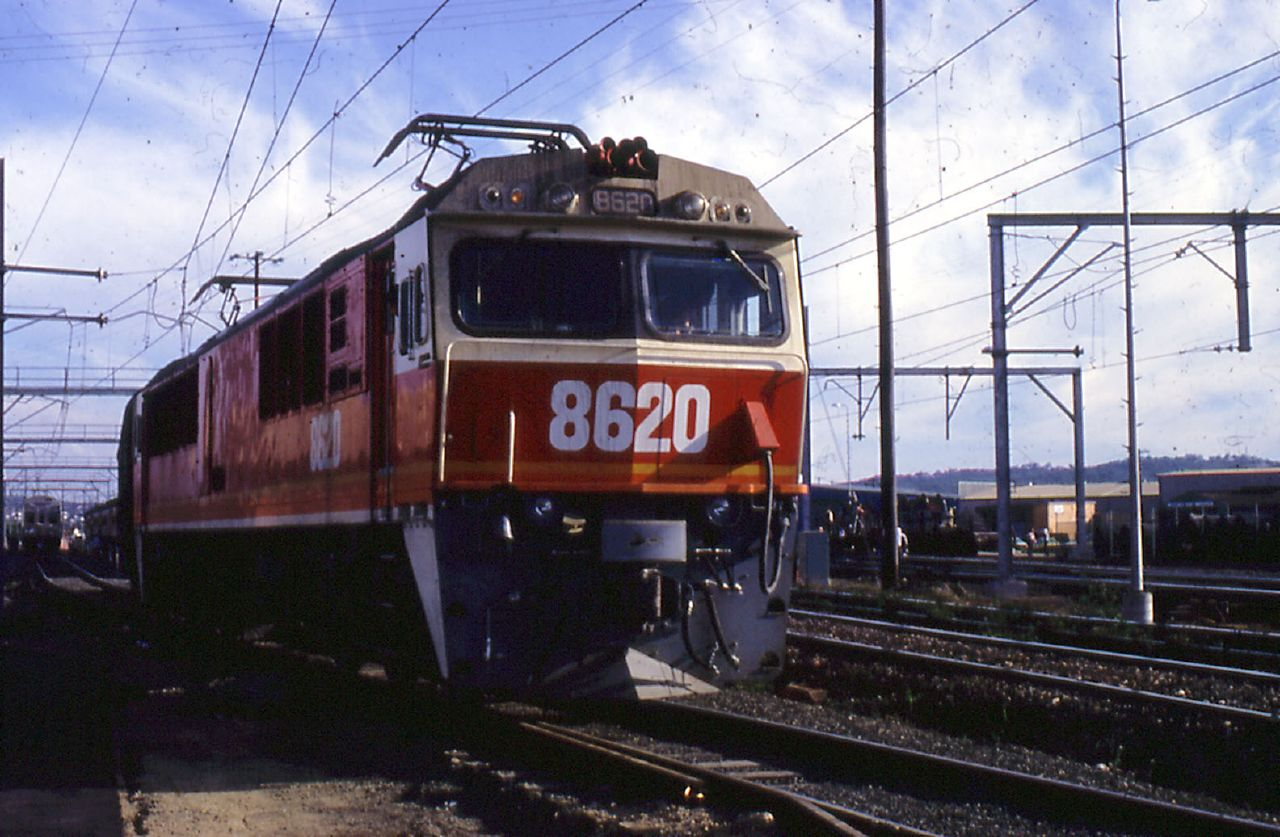
- 8620 at an unknown location in 1983
Type and origin
- Power type: Electric
- Builder: Comeng, Granville
- Build date: 1983–1985
- Total produced: 50
Specifications
- Configuration
  - UIC: 8601-8649: Co′Co′ 8650: Bo′Bo′Bo′
- Gauge: 1,435 mm (4 ft 8 1/2 in) standard gauge
- Wheel diameter: 1,250 mm (49.21 in)
- Wheelbase: 15.40 m (50 ft 6 1/4 in)
- Length: Over headstocks: 18.73 m (61 ft 5 3/8 in); Over coupler pulling faces: 20.08 m (65 ft 10 1/2 in)
- Width: 2,950 mm (9 ft 8 1/8 in)
- Height: Over stowed pantograph: 4,400 mm (14 ft 5 1/4 in)
- Axle load: 19.80 tonnes (19.5 long tons; 21.8 short tons)
- Loco weight: 119.0 tonnes (117.1 long tons; 131.2 short tons)
- Electric system/s: 1,500 V DC Overhead
- Current pickup: Two pantographs
- Traction motors: 6 × Mitsubishi MB-485-BVR
Performance figures
- Maximum speed: 130 km/h (81 mph) (Design Max.); 105 km/h (65 mph) (TfNSW restriction)
- Power output: Continuous: 2,700 kW (3,620 hp), One hour: 2,880 kW (3,860 hp)
- Tractive effort: Continuous: 222.00 kN (49,908 lbf) at 45 km/h (28 mph)
Career
- Operators: State Rail Authority; FreightCorp
- Number in class: 50
- Numbers: 8601-8650
- First run: 15 March 1983
- Last run: 30 June 2002
- Preserved: 8601, 8606, 8607, 8644, 8646, 8649, 8650
- Disposition: 7 preserved with 2 operational and 5 static, 43 scrapped

The 86 class is a class of electric locomotives built by Comeng, Granville for the State Rail Authority of New South Wales.

== History ==
In 1981 Comeng was awarded the contract to build fifty units, using Mitsubishi camshaft-control equipment. Mitsubishi proposed to use the newer chopper technology as camshaft control was by now near-obsolete and they had in fact ceased to manufacture these. However the SRA were insistent on using the older technology so Mitsubishi re-started camshaft equipment production just for this contract. Major electrical equipment was interchangeable with the 85-class locomotives and two had the capability of multiple-unit operations.

The 86 class initially hauled passenger and freight services to Lithgow on the Main Western line (including the Indian Pacific) and Wyong on the Main Northern line. Their sphere of operation extended to Newcastle on the latter line in June 1984 and to Port Kembla in January 1986 when the Illawarra line was electrified.

With a one-hour rating of 4,400 horsepower (hp), the 86 class was the most powerful locomotive in Australia at the time. Although no longer in regular use, the class remains among the most powerful in the country. Despite their higher power rating, they were generally regarded as inferior to the Metropolitan-Vickers built 46 class, which dated from the late 1950s. 8619 was planned for Conversion into a Drivable Crew Van for SCT at Islington Workshops, this plan was scrapped.

The last, 8650 was delivered as a Bo-Bo-Bo trial unit. It spent long periods out of traffic undergoing repair.

The SRA had intended to order dual voltage 1.5 kV DC and 25 kV AC variants for use on the Maldon-Dombarton line, but this never eventuated due to the cancellation of the project.

In 1994/95 all were repainted by A Goninan & Co, Taree into Freight Rail (later FreightCorp) blue. By October 1997 18 had been withdrawn from service with cracked frames. By this stage the amount of work requiring electrics was reducing. National Rail decided it would through haul its services and from March 1998 FreightCorp ceased operating them on Main Northern line services. The need for electrics continued to decline with their remaining duties mainly being hauling coal trains from Lithgow to Port Kembla. The last examples were withdrawn in June 2002.

In 2002, most were sold to Silverton Rail and taken to Broken Hill then sold again in February 2006 to Allco Finance Group with some on sold, but most scrapped. Four were leased back to RailCorp in 2004 (8601, 8609, 8622 and 8644) for use on infrastructure trains during construction of the Bondi Junction turnback.

Seven locomotives remain. Transport Heritage NSW owns 8646 which is on display at the NSW Rail Museum at Thirlmere. Both 8601, the first in the class and 8650, the last electric locomotive built by Commonwealth Engineering, are stored at the Dorrigo Steam Railway & Museum.

The Sydney Electric Train Society (SETS) owns locomotives 8606, 8644 and 8649, the latter of which is in operational condition and has been returned to its original Candy livery.8607 is privately owned and stored at Canberra, awaiting restoration.

== Fleet Status ==
Number	Entered service	Withdrawn	Location	Status
8601	February 1983	?	Dorrigo, NSW	Static Display
8602	April 1983	?	-	Scrapped
8603	April 1983	?	-	Scrapped
8604	May 1983	?	-	Scrapped
8605	September 1983	?	-	Scrapped
8606	September 1983	?	Enfield, NSW	Operational
8607	September 1983	?	Canberra, NSW	Stored
8608	October 1983	?	-	Scrapped
8609	October 1983	?	-	Scrapped
8610	October 1983	?	-	Scrapped
8611	November 1983	?	-	Scrapped
8612	November 1983	?	-	Scrapped
8613	December 1983	?	-	Scrapped
8614	December 1983	?	-	Scrapped
8615	January 1984	?	-	Scrapped
8616	January 1984	?	-	Scrapped
8617	February 1984	?	-	Scrapped
8618	March 1984	?	-	Scrapped
8619	April 1984	?	-	Scrapped
8620	April 1984	?		Scrapped
8621	May 1984	?	-	Scrapped
8622	May 1984	?	-	Scrapped
8623	June 1984	?	-	Scrapped
8624	July 1984	?	-	Scrapped
8625	July 1984	?	-	Scrapped
8626	September 1984	?	-	Scrapped
8627	October 1984	?	-	Scrapped
8628	September 1984	?	-	Scrapped
8629	October 1984	?	-	Scrapped
8630	October 1984	?	-	Scrapped
8631	November 1984	?	-	Scrapped
8632	November 1984	?	-	Scrapped
8633	December 1984	?	-	Scrapped
8634	December 1984	?	-	Scrapped
8635	December 1984	?	-	Scrapped
8636	January 1985	?	-	Scrapped
8637	February 1985	?	-	Scrapped
8638	March 1985	?	-	Scrapped
8639	March 1985	?	-	Scrapped
8640	April 1985	?	-	Scrapped
8641	May 1985	?	-	Scrapped
8642	May 1985	?	-	Scrapped
8643	June 1985	?	-	Scrapped
8644	June 1985	30 June 2002	Chullora, NSW	Stored
8645	July 1985	?	-	Scrapped
8646	August 1985	?	Thirlmere, NSW	Static display
8647	August 1985	?	-	Scrapped
8648	August 1985	?	-	Scrapped
8649	4 October 1985	4 February 1998	Enfield, NSW	Operational
8650	1986	?	Dorrigo, NSW	Static Display
