= Sydney Electric Train Society =

Australian railway preservation society

- Abbreviation: SETS
- Formation: 1991
- Type: Nonprofit
- Location: Sydney, Australia
- Website: http://www.sets.org.au

The Sydney Electric Train Society (SETS) is a railway preservation society in Sydney, Australia. It specialises in NSW electric traction and particularly NSW electric locomotives.

== History ==
The Sydney Electric Train Society was established in July 1991 with the aim of preserving Sydney's vintage electric fleet that by this point were colloquially known as "Red Rattlers". In January 1992, it operated its first tour with single deck stock across the CityRail suburban network, the last of which were about to be withdrawn.

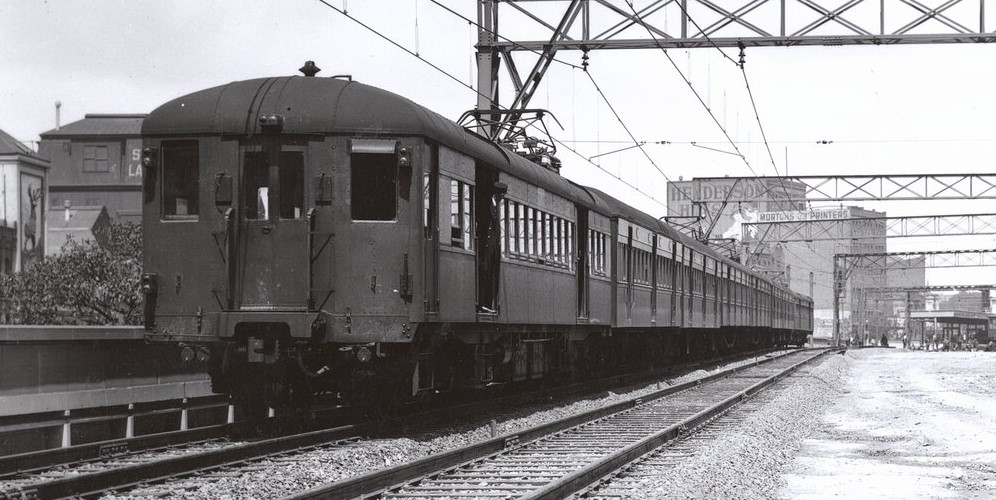
The first electric train service from Central to St James in 1926

By 1993, the executive of SETS had significantly changed to include more “mature” members. This went a long way to regaining some credibility with senior key players in the State Rail Authority. Through the hard work of these mature members, the manual doors impasse was settled. Tours then resumed, using trains hired from the SRA, with significant success through 1995 and 1996. A four car heritage set known as "M1" would commonly be used on such tours formed of carriages C3218, T4527, D4052, and C3102. In 1995, this set would be moved to Flemington where it would be known as "F1".

In 1997, a number of SETS members voluntarily resigned with a new board taking on the job of electric preservation. This was due to a disagreement in operations with volunteers split on a private or public ownership. The remaining members of SETS would follow the private operation of owning rolling stock whilst the members that resigned would start a new organisation Historic Electric Traction (HET) with its primary objective of SRA owning the rolling stock whilst HET would be the care takers of it; a partnership of sorts.

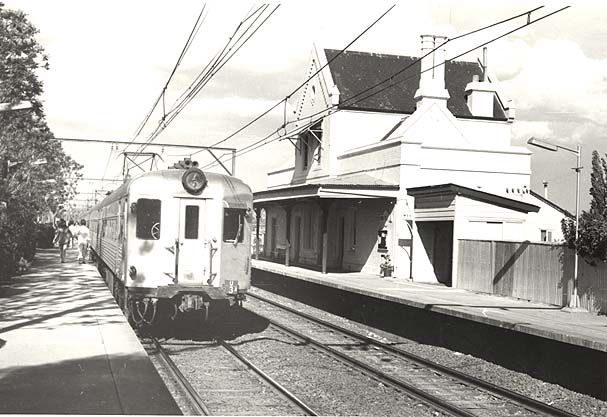
The U set, an other example of a single deck carriage type that SETS aimed to preserve

On 20 April 1998, SETS purchased 46 class electric locomotive 4615. Later in 1998, it purchased four Tulloch power cars from the SRA along with five U set carriages. It has since expanded its collection with 85 and 86 class locomotives, one Wooden motor car and two Suburban power cars acquired from RailCorp and the only complete Sydney Monorail set. An additional U set motor carriage and 46 class locomotive was purchased in April 2013 from the Hunter Valley Railway Trust.

SETS rolling stock has at various times been on static display at various public railway museums; Lithgow State Mine Heritage Park & Railway, the Goulburn Rail Heritage Centre and Junee Roundhouse Railway Museum. From 2003 to 2009, SETS operational electric locos and interurban cars were housed at Hornsby Maintenance Depot. In 2009, locomotives 8606 and 4615 along with CF5003 and CF5021 would be forcefully removed from Hornsby after a disagreement in storage. They would be moved by rail with a 44 class locomotive to Junee where they would be stored on display at the Junee Roundhouse.

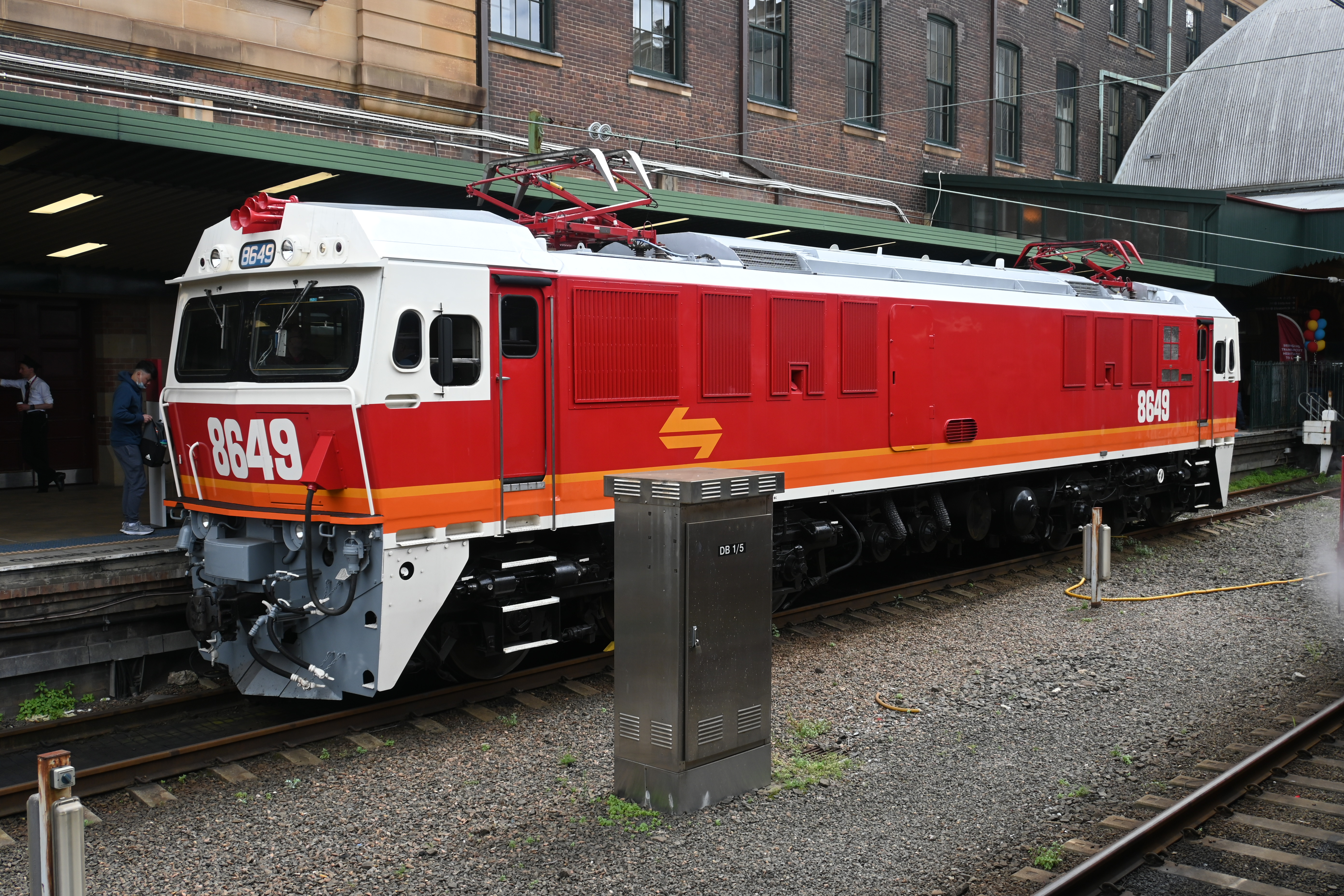
86 class locomotive 8649, SETS currently only operational locomotive at the 2022 heritage expo

In June 2018, 4615, 8606, CF5003 and CF5021 would be then removed from Junee due to a disagreement in storage there and would be transferred to Lithgow with 8606 returned to service to haul infrastructure trains on the Sydney Trains underground network.

As of 2023, SETS had a number of its assets scattered across NSW with many items in various stages of restoration. A line up of eight red set carriages have been left at Chullora awaiting collection and moved to a secure location for future restoration. 46 class locomotives 4615 and 4627 are at Lithgow alongside U set motor carriages CF5003 and CF5021.

4615 is awaiting an ICE radio to be installed, 4627 is awaiting funding for a static repaint, whilst the U set carriages sit in the yard awaiting restoration. 8501 is presently at Werris Creek awaiting reactivation. 8606 is at Port Kembla awaiting traction motors to be refitted. 8649 is currently the only operating asset SETS has presently running rail robel runs in the city underground late at night.

SETS has also been allocated a four car S Set and four car C Set; both of which have not been signed officially over to SETS ownership and are currently sitting out the back of Auburn Heavy Maintenance Centre (formerly MainTrain). When the carriages are officially signed over to SETS, they will have 30 days to remove them from Sydney Trains land.

== Collection ==
=== Electric locomotives ===
Number	Image	Year	Manufacturer	Notes
4615		1956	Metropolitan-Vickers	Purchased April 1998, at Lithgow Locomotive Maintenance Centre for re-activation as at May 2019. Still awaiting ICE radio installation as of October 2023.
4627		1957	Metropolitan-Vickers	Purchased April 2013, at Lithgow in the yard at Lithgow State Mine Railway as of October 2023. Is awaiting further donations for it to be restored to static display.
8501		1979	Commonwealth Engineering	Stored at Werris Creek, one compressor temporarily swapped with 8649. Planned to be restored to operational condition.
8606		1983	Commonwealth Engineering	Purchased February 2003, based at Enfield Yard, restored to operational condition in 2018 as a heritage loco and for Pacific National to use on Robel infrastructure trains on the Sydney Trains underground network. Currently stabled at Progress Rail Port Kembla awaiting traction motors to be refitted.
8649		1985	Commonwealth Engineering	Purchased July 2018, based at Enfield Yard, restored to operational condition in 2020-21 as a heritage loco and as a second loco for Pacific National to use on Robel infrastructure trains on the Sydney Trains underground network.On 9 May 2022, 8649 returned repainted in the SRA Candy livery.

=== Electric multiple units ===
Number	Image	Year	Manufacturer	Notes
C3082 (ex. EBB2166)		1921	Ritchie Brothers	Acquired 2008. Stored indoors at Bilpin
C3104 (ex. EBB2250)		1925	Leeds Forge Company	Acquired 2008. Stored indoors at Bilpin
C3444		1937	Clyde Engineering	Acquired 2008. Stored indoors at Bilpin
C7489 (ex. C3489)		1950	Tulloch Limited	Acquired 1998 left abandoned at Chullora Industrial siding as of October 2023
C7510 (ex. C3510)		1950	Tulloch Limited	Acquired 1998 sitting in a field on private property in Castlereagh as of October 2023
C7512 (ex. C3512)		1950	Tulloch Limited	Acquired 1998 left abandoned at Chullora Industrial siding as of October 2023
C7513 (ex. C3513)		1950	Tulloch Limited	Acquired 1998 left abandoned at Chullora Industrial siding as of October 2023
CF5001		1958	Commonwealth Engineering	Acquired 2013 moved from Rothbury to unknown location in mid 2023. Missing traction motors.
CF5003		1958	Commonwealth Engineering	Acquired 1998 currently at Lithgow as of October 2023
CF5021		1958	Commonwealth Engineering	Acquired 1998 currently at Lithgow as of October 2023
CF5022		1958	Commonwealth Engineering	Acquired 1998
ETB6037		1958	Commonwealth Engineering	Acquired 1998
TF6010		1958	Commonwealth Engineering	Acquired 1998
C3861		1972	Commonwealth Engineering	Under ownership of Sydney Trains at present. Stored at Auburn
T4983		1975	Commonwealth Engineering	Under ownership of Sydney Trains at present. Stored at Auburn
T4003		1978	Commonwealth Engineering	Under ownership of Sydney Trains at present. Stored at Auburn
C3057		1977	A Goninan & Co	Under ownership of Sydney Trains at present. Stored at Auburn
C3584		1986	A Goninan & Co	Under ownership of Sydney Trains at present. Stored at Auburn
T4266		1987	A Goninan & Co	Under ownership of Sydney Trains at present. Stored at Auburn
T4274		1987	A Goninan & Co	Under ownership of Sydney Trains at present. Stored at Auburn
C3608		1987	A Goninan & Co	Under ownership of Sydney Trains at present. Stored at Auburn

=== Monorail ===
Number	Image	Year	Manufacturer	Notes
Von Roll Mk3 Set 4		1988	Von Roll Holding	Acquired 2013

Aside from these aforementioned assets, various pieces remain privately owned by SETS members.

== Publication ==
The society formerly published Under the Wires, a bi-monthly magazine.
