= Electric Carriage Workshops =

Former railway maintenance centre in New South Wales, Australia

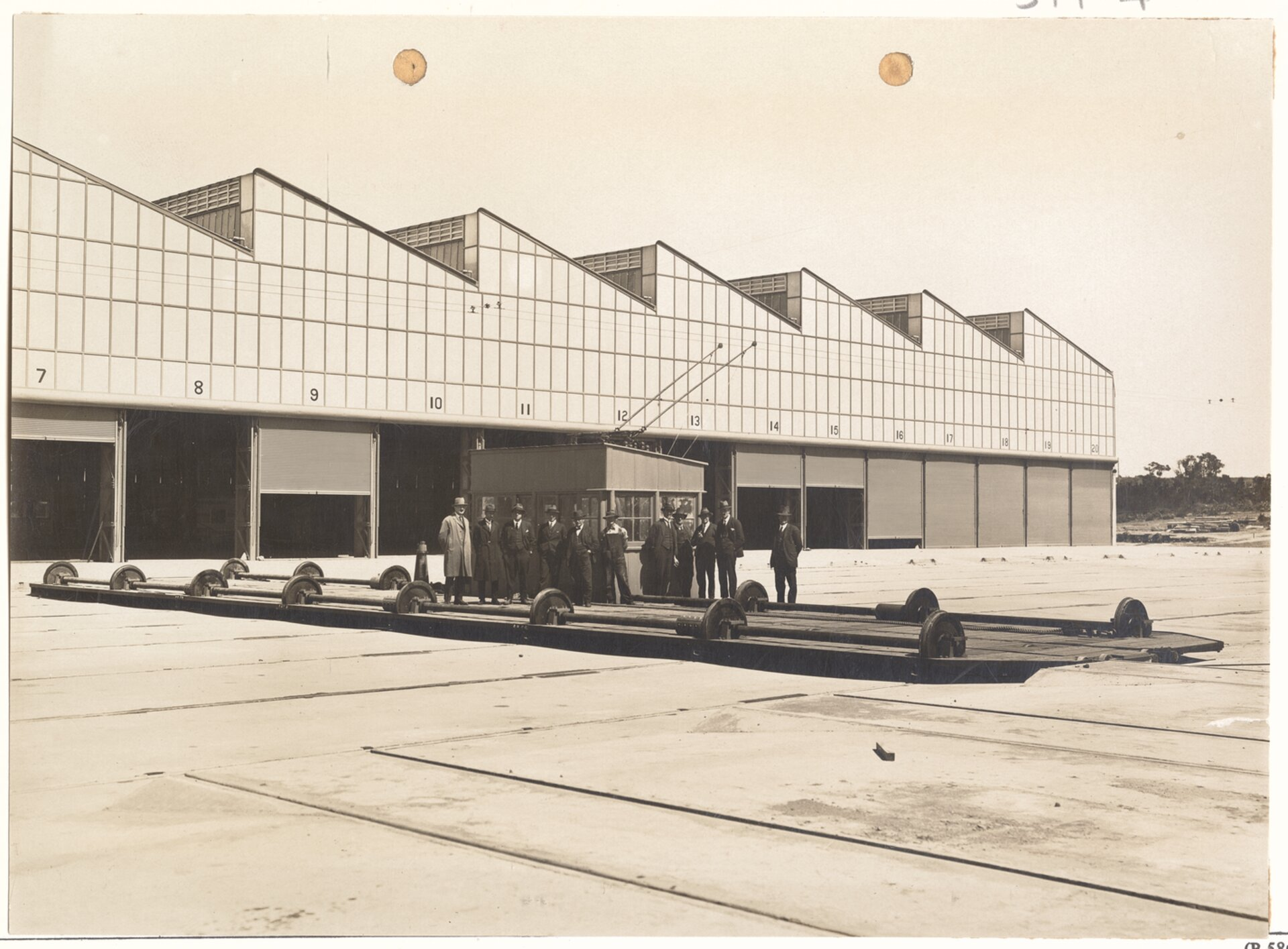
- Elcar works in 1926

Location
- Location: Muir Road, Chullora

Characteristics
- Owner: State Rail Authority
- Operator: CityRail

History
- Opened: 1920s
- Closed: 1994

The Electric Carriage Workshops, often abbreviated to Elcar, was the principal maintenance centre for the New South Wales Government Railways electric multiple unit fleet. Construction commenced in 1922, coinciding with the electrification of the Sydney network. It was located within the Chullora Railway Workshops complex on a 106-hectare (260-acre) site. It was not electrified until 1939 requiring carriages to be hauled to and from the works by steam locomotive.

Elcar had a railway station that was served by worker's trains at shift changeover times.

It closed in March 1994, when maintenance of CityRail's electric fleet was taken over by UGL Rail's Maintrain facility at Auburn. The site has been redeveloped as the Chullora Resource Recovery Park.
