= Koompartoo =

Sydney Harbour Ferry

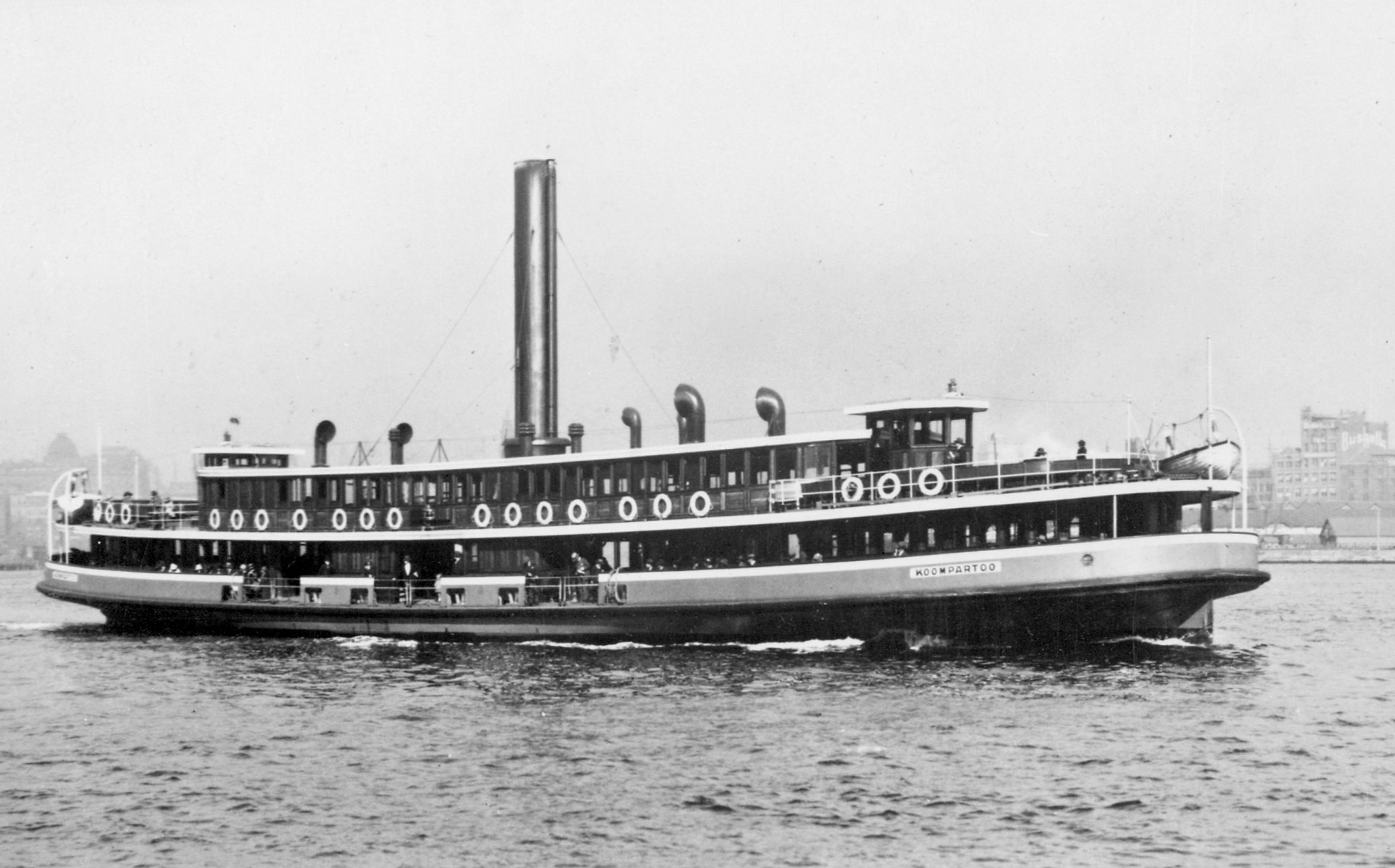
- Koompartoo on the Circular Quay to Milson's Point route for which she was designed and built. Prior to Sydney Harbour Bridge opening, likely 1920s.

History

Australia
- Name: Koompartoo
- Namesake: Aboriginal word meaning new beginnings
- Owner: Sydney Ferries Limited
- Route: Circular Quay-Milsons Point
- Builder: Walsh Island Dockyard and Engineering Works, Newcastle
- Yard number: 53
- In service: 1922 - 1941

Australia
- Name: HMAS Koompartoo
- Owner: Royal Australian Navy
- Acquired: 18 June 1942
- Commissioned: 23 December 1942
- Decommissioned: 8 June 1962
- Identification: Z256

General characteristics
- Tonnage: 448 GRT, 201 NRT
- Length: 191 ft (58 m)
- Beam: 38.3 ft (11.7 m)
- Speed: 12 knots
- Capacity: 2,089
- Armament: 2 × Oerlikon 20 mm cannons; 4 × Vickers machine guns

Koompartoo was a 1922 Sydney Ferries Limited K-class ferry later converted to a Royal Australian Navy boom defence vessel. Koompartoo, described in the press as a "Dreadnought for the Milsons Point run" and "a titan amongst ferries", was along with her sister ferry, Kuttabul, the highest capacity ferries ever on Sydney Harbour.

Commencing ferry service in 1922, they were designed and built for the short heavy-lift run on the Circular Quay to Milsons Point across to Sydney's North Shore prior to the 1932 opening of the Sydney Harbour Bridge.

Following the opening of the Sydney Harbour Bridge, both ferries were redundant. During World War II, they were requisitioned by the Royal Australian Navy. Kuttabul was sunk during the 1942 Japanese Attack on Sydney Harbour with the loss of 19 lives. Koompartoo was converted to a boom defence vessel and taken to Darwin. Following the War, she was laid up in Sydney until 1962 when she was taken to Launceston, Tasmania where her hull was used as bauxite barge. Her final fate is unclear.

The name, "Koompartoo", is thought to be an Australian Aboriginal word meaning "fresh start", and the boat followed about twenty previous Sydney Ferries K-class vessels named with Aboriginal words starting with "K".

== Background ==
In the early twentieth century, prior to the opening of the Sydney Harbour Bridge in 1932, Sydney Ferries Limited was running one of the largest ferry fleets in the world to cater for booming demand for ferry services across Sydney Harbour to Sydney's North Shore. In particular, more and bigger ferries were needed to service the crowded Milsons Point to Circular Quay route (in the approximate location and route of the current Sydney Harbour Bridge). The Milson's Point wharf was an interchange with the North Shore rail terminus and is now the location of Luna Park. Peak hour ferries were leaving either side of the harbour at the rate of one fully loaded vessel every six minutes. An order was placed for two similar and very large steel-hulled high capacity ferries - Koompartoo and Kuttabul - to service the short heavy-lift route.

== Design and construction ==
The two ferries were built in 1922 by the Walsh Island Dockyard and Engineering Works in Newcastle. At 58 m (190 ft) in length, and with very large beams of 11.7 m (38 ft) for most of their lengths, the two vessels were the largest ferries owned by Sydney Ferries and the last of the company's K-class. The two boats represented the peak of the K-class design of double-ended ferries. The Department of Navigation granted Koompartoo a passenger certificate for 2,089 people, which was the highest passenger capacity of any ferries ever on Sydney Harbour. This was 730 more than Sydney Ferries Limited's previous largest ferry, Kuramia (1914), and almost 500 people more than the Port Jackson and Manly Steamship Company's Manly ferries.

Koompartoo's 113 hp triple-expansion steam engines of the inverted type and built by the builder, pushed her to 12 knots. Steam was provided by two gunboat type boilers at 180 lb pressure. The two sister ferries were built with steel hulls and wooden superstructures unlike most other K-class ferries, which were built with timber hulls (sisters Kanangra and Kirawa, both 1912, also had steel hulls). Koompartoo was part of a £190,000 order of three ferries, the other two being sister Kuttabul and vehicular ferry Kooroongaba.

Koompartoo was constructed with 18 watertight compartments, regarded as being unsinkable and therefore was not required to carry life saving equipment. The ferry's designers and builders that the ferry was thus to stable that "nothing short of an unheard of catastrophe could make her turn over", in which case, passengers would not have time to make use of the lifejackets and other apparatus usually provided. As such, the Superintendent of Navigation used his discretion provided for under the Navigation Act to dispense with lifejackets and lower the required buoyant apparatus from 40% of the total number of passengers, to 10%.

Koompartoo was launched on 15 December 1921, and christened by Miss Wise, daughter of a Sydney Ferries Limited director.

Koompartoo's livery generally followed the Sydney Ferries Limited tradition of varnished superstructures with white edging around the promenade deck. The steel hull and main deck bulwarks were painted a light grey. Her strikingly tall single funnel was painted black.

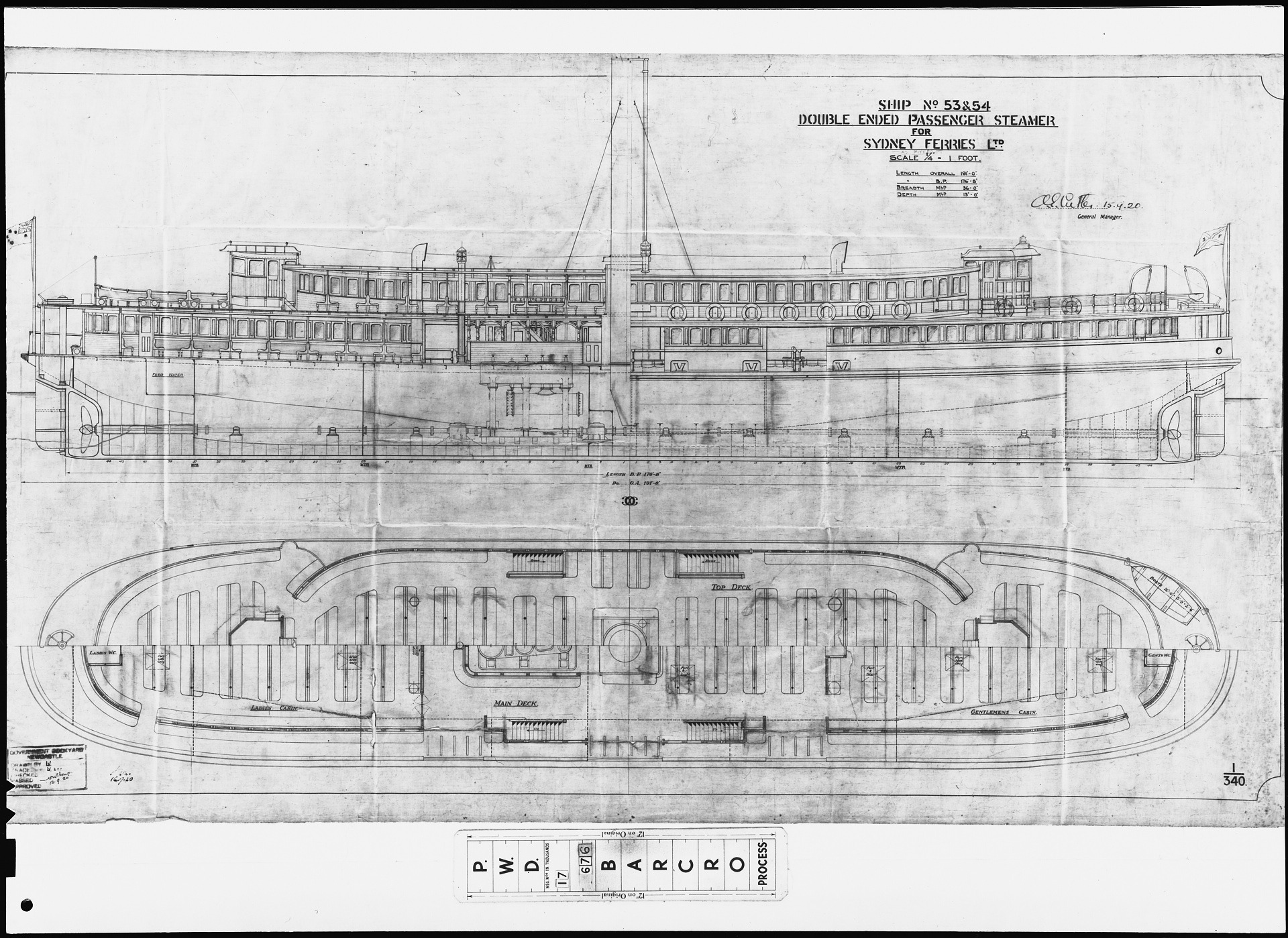
General arrangement plans for Koompartoo and sister, Kuttabul

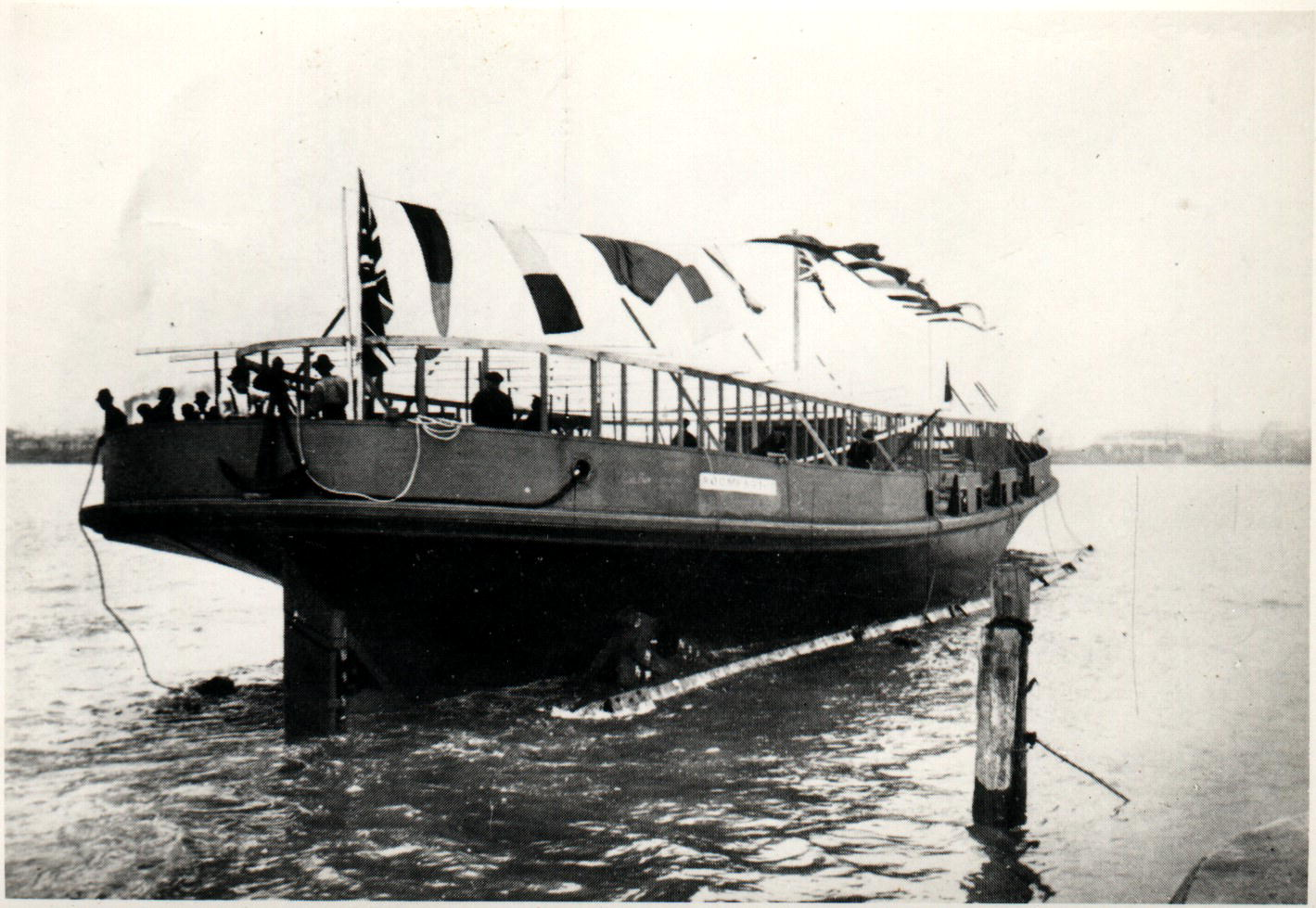
Launch day at Walsh Island Dockyard and Engineering Works, 15 December 1921.

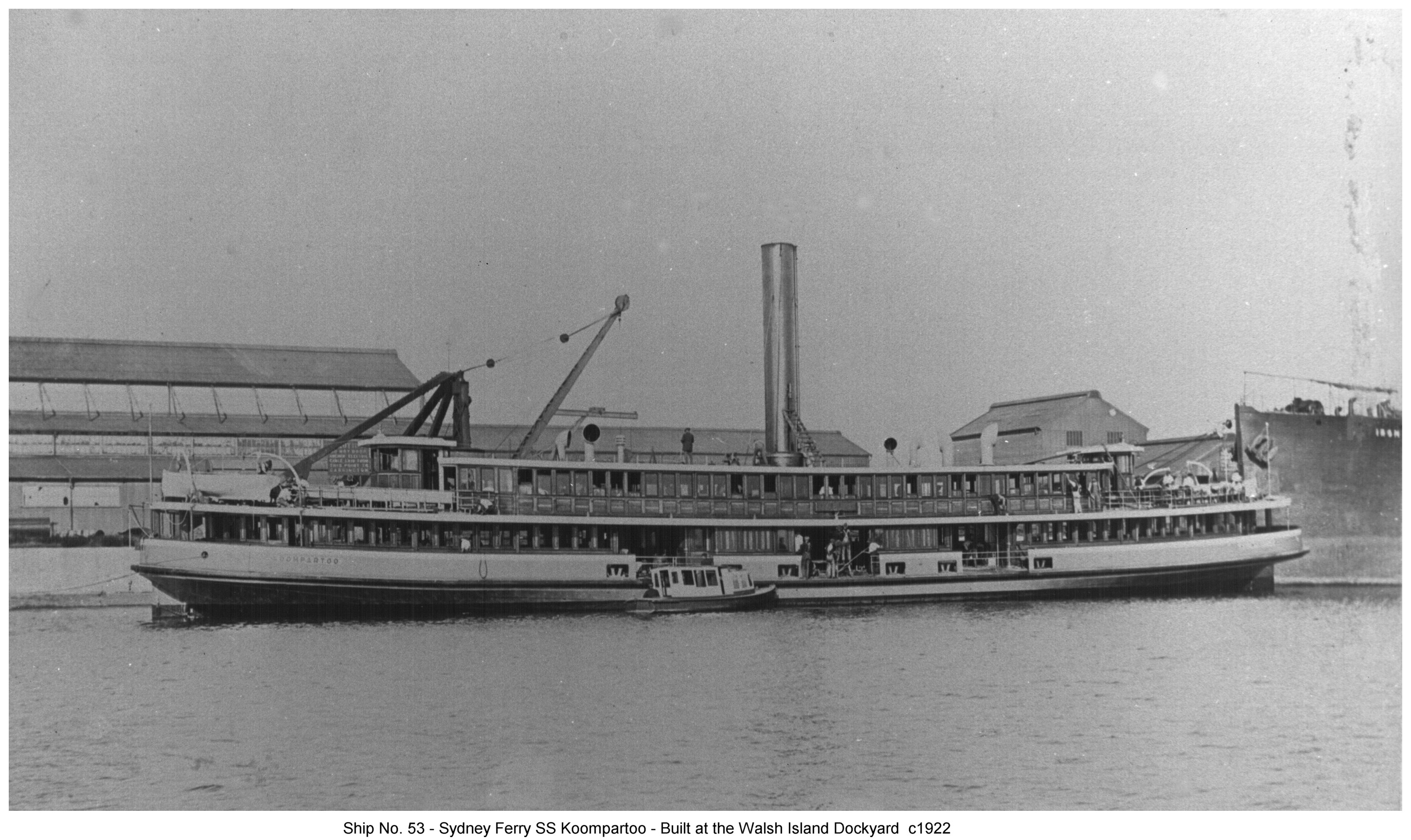
Koompartoo thought to be photographed new at Walsh Island Dockyard, 1922

== Ferry service ==
We may regard this splendid ship as a tribute paid by shareholders to the residents of North Sydney, and as an earnest effort on the part of the company to cater for the demands of the traffic. It is a fitting answer to our critics. We cannot go without expressing keen appreciation of the splendid skill and patience displayed by Mr. Cutler and the builders and designers of the vessel. It is evidence of what can be done in our own yards by our own citizens."

— B.T. Parker, Chairman of Directors, Sydney Ferries Limited, at commemorative speech made on boa on the day of Koompartoo's arrival in Sydney, 12 April 1922

The new Koompartoo arrived in Sydney Harbour on the morning of 12 April 1922 with ferries and other craft blowing whistles and sirens in welcome. She was bedecked in bunting with the code flags "From Walsh Island" displayed. She had left Newcastle six hours before at midnight under the charge of AE Cutler, general manager of the Walsh Island dockyard, and for insurance purposes, she was accompanied for insurance purposes by the tug Heroine. For most of the trip, she travelled at half speed, however, from Barrenjoey, she travelled at full speed of 13 knots for the last hour of the journey.

She entered the Sydney Heads at 6am and was moored at Clifton Gardens alongside the smaller ferry, Karaga, where breakfast was provided for the crew and dignitaries. Following the commemorative proceedings, Koompartoo was put through her speed trials that afternoon maintaining 13½ knots.

Koompartoo began service on the short heavy lift trip between Milson's Point and Circular Quay in early May 1922. Supporting the large steel hulled twins, were usually the timber "K-class" Kuramia (1914), Kaikai, and Kulgoa.

=== Incidents ===
- On 25 October 1923, a boy named Oatley was climbing on to the bulwarks of the ferry as it was approaching Circular Quay this morning, when he slipped, and fell over the side. A man named Jack Knucky dived in after the boy, and kept him afloat until a rope was thrown from another ferry, and both were hauled to safety.
- In 1926, Koompartoo collided with Kaikai in thick fog severely damaging the latter. Passengers on Kaikai's lower deck scrambled clear just in time. Kaikai's bow was stove in, and her bulwarks and sponson were crumbled. The forward upper and lower decks were also stoved in with the ladies cabin and steering gear damaged. Damage to Kaikai was estimated at £300 to £400. Koompartoo, being built of steel, was not significantly damaged. While there was great excitement on both ferries, there was no panic or injuries.
- On 25 July 1928, Koompartoo collided with Kirrule at Circular Quay, with the latter suffering substantial damage. Kirrule was returning from Athol and had her bulwarks and rails damaged. The crash occurred in heavy rain about 200 m from the wharf, causing women to scream and drop their parcels. Once the danger had passed, passengers retrieved their belongings with one woman seen searching for cash that she had dropped in her excitement. No-one was injured.
- 21 August 1929 - A lighter being towed by a tug hit the stern of Koompartoo as the ferry was half across from Circular Quay to Milsons Point at 6.20pm on its last trip for the day. The ferry was crowded and men rushed and women screamed. No-one was injured however some women complained of shock.
- 18 December 1938 - Norman Jack Carroll, 21, of Sydenham Road, Marrickville, fell from Koompartoo near Ball's Head and suffered from the effects of immersion. He was picked up by a nearby man in a dingy and was taken by the Central District, Ambulance to Sydney Hospital.

== Post Harbour Bridge ==
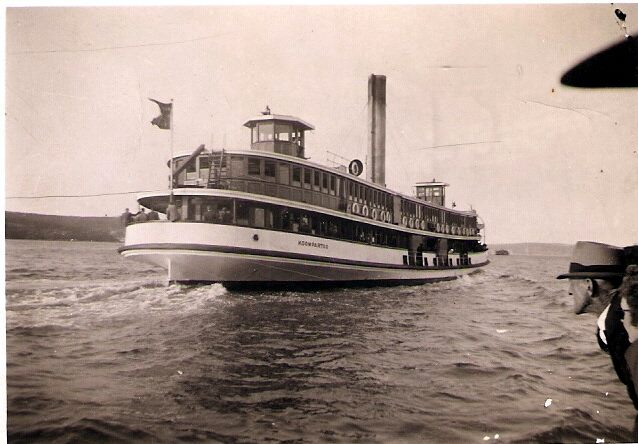
Koompartoo with flying bridges and after conversion to concert ferry

With the opening of the Sydney Harbour Bridge in 1932, the once crowded route was effectively redundant. Koompartoo and Kuttabul were too big to be useful on the other cross harbour routes which also saw significant and sudden drops in trade, and the two ferries were laid up. Almost twenty Sydney Ferries were decommissioned in the two years following the bridge's opening. The two were both of relatively young age and were considered for conversion to run the Manly route. Koompartoo was later made available for tourist, spectator and concert cruises on the harbour.

Her wheel houses were raised (flying bridges) in the 1930s to allow her master to see over spectators on the decks. Her roles included service carrying crowds of passengers to the regular Head of the River rowing carnivals and following the sailing boat races that were growing in popularity at the time. This was also the period of the Great Depression and Koompartoo found a new career as a concert boat, a role she filled between 1935 and 1941.

== World War II ==
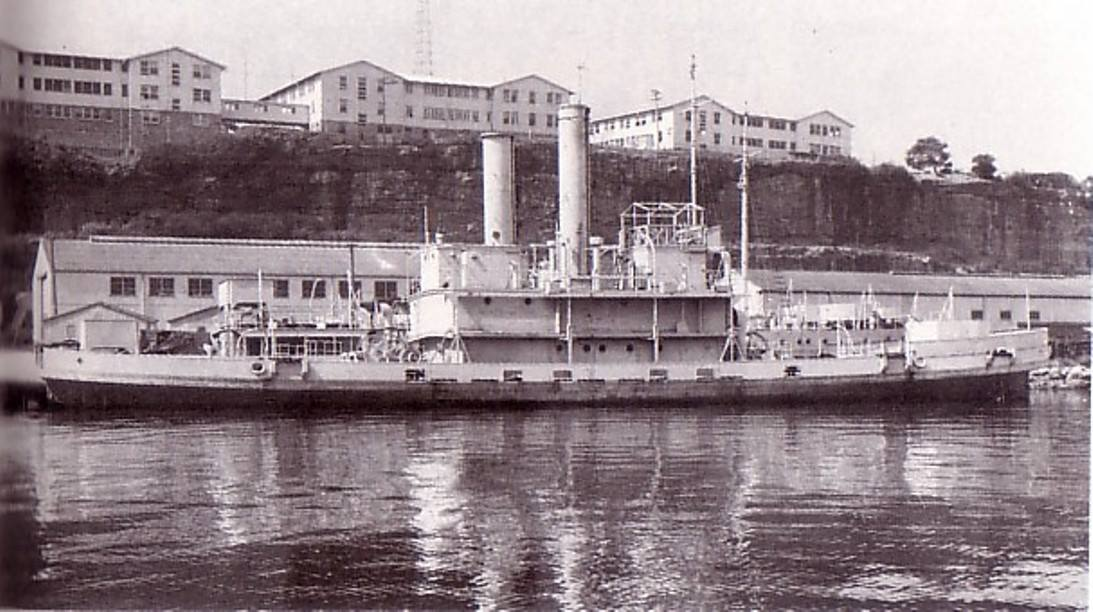
HMAS Koompartoo at HMAS Waterhen

In 1941, Koompartoo was purchased by the British Ministry of War Transport for service in the Middle East and taken to Mort's Dock for conversion. However with the outbreak of the Pacific War she was never deployed, instead being taken over by the Royal Australian Navy on 18 June 1942 and converted to a boom defence vessel. Armed with two 20mm Oerlikons and four Vickers .303 MGs, she was commissioned on 23 December 1942 under the command of Lieutenant GG Moss, RANR (S) and taken to Darwin in January 1943 where she served until the end of the war. Held in reserve in Darwin from 1945 until 1950, she returned to Sydney and was laid up at Athol Bight.

In April 1962, she was declared for disposal and sold out of the Service on 8 June 1962, stripped of her superstructure and towed to Launceston in 1966 for use as a bauxite barge. Her final fate is unclear, however, it is thought she may have sunk in Port Latta and then removed.

== See also ==
- List of Sydney Harbour ferries
- Timeline of Sydney Harbour ferries
- Sydney K-class ferries
