= New South Wales Standard suburban carriage stock =

Withdrawn class of electric train in New South Wales

Standard suburban carriage stock
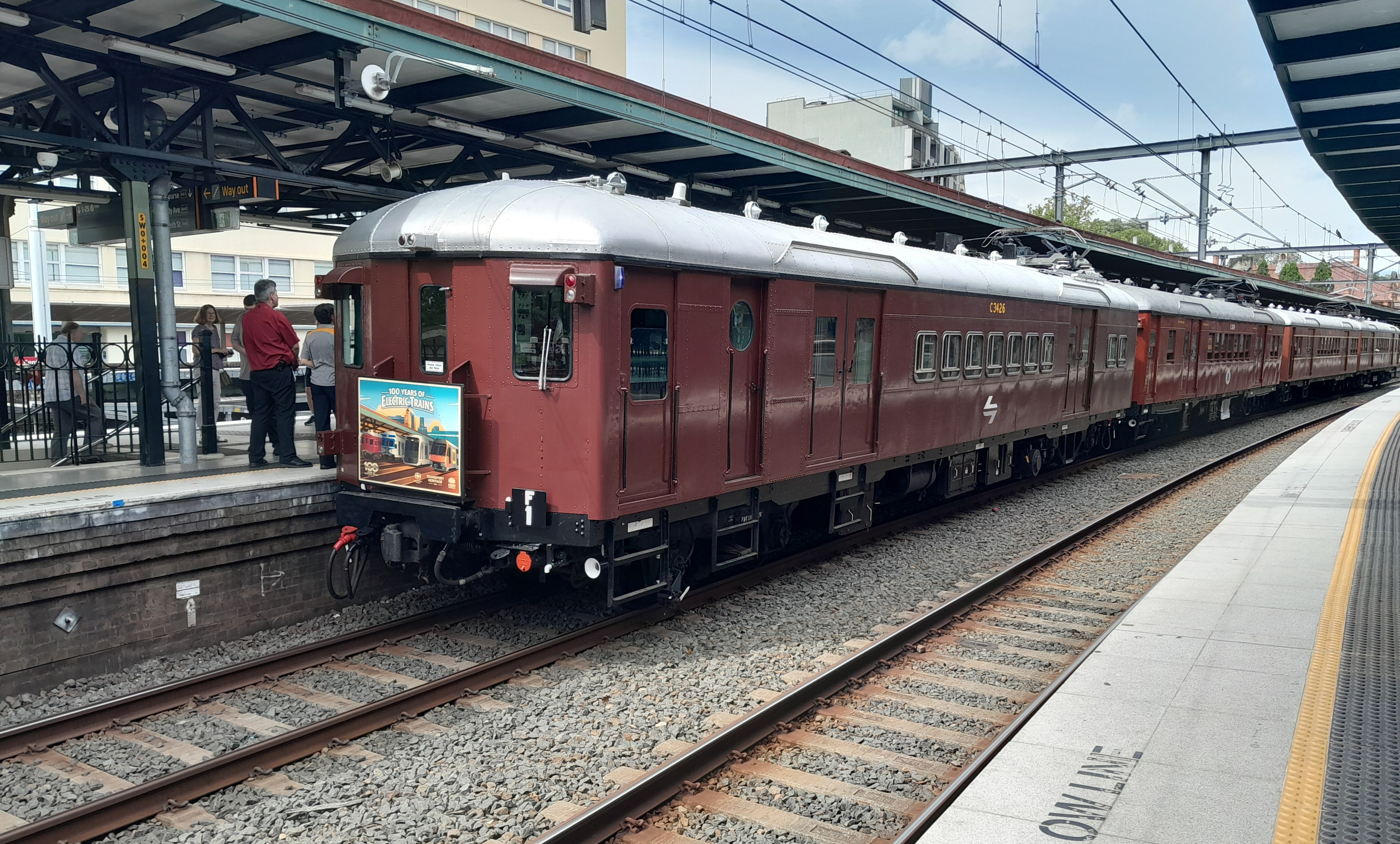
- Heritage set F1 at Central for 100 years of Electric trains in New South Wales

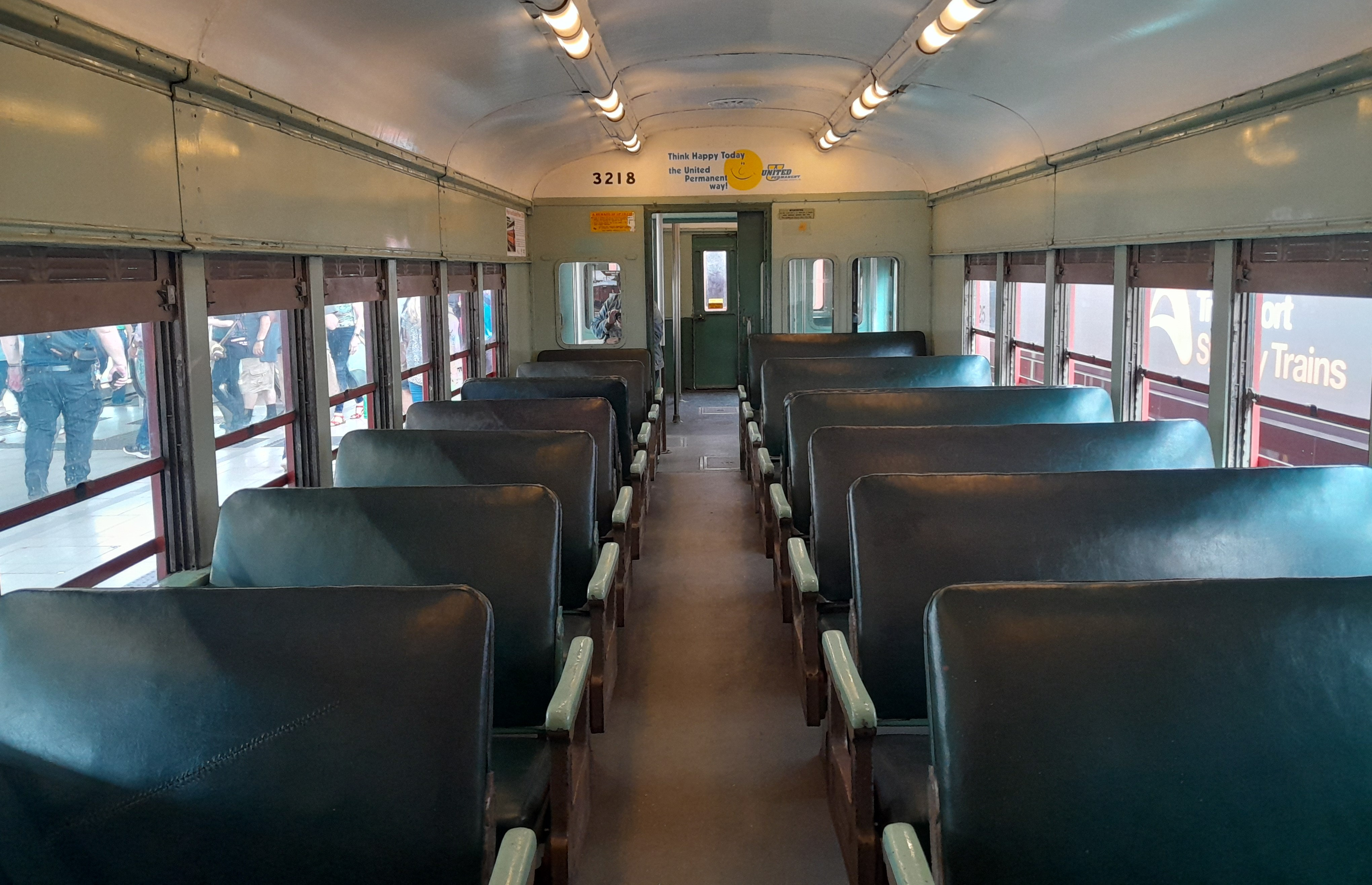
- Interior of carriage C3218
- Stock type: Electric Multiple Unit (EMU)
- In service: 1925–1992
- Manufacturers: Leeds Forge Company (50); Clyde Engineering (202); Walsh Island Dockyard (351)
- Built at: Leeds; Granville; Walsh Island
- Constructed: 1925–1937
- Number built: 355 motor cars; 248 trailer cars
- Successor: K sets C sets T sets
- Formation: 2–8 carriages
- Fleet numbers: C3101–3452; C3901–C3903; T4301–T4548
- Operators: New South Wales Government Railways; Public Transport Commission; State Rail Authority; CityRail
- Depots: Flemington (in F sets); Hornsby (in H sets); Mortdale (in M sets); Punchbowl (in B sets)
- Line served: All Sydney suburban except Eastern Suburbs

Specifications
- Car length: 18.75 m (61 ft 6 1/4 in)
- Width: 3,185 mm (10 ft 5 3/8 in)
- Height: 3,920 mm (12 ft 10 3/8 in)
- Doors: 4 manual double sliding doors on each side
- Maximum speed: 80 km/h (50 mph) (TfNSW limit); 3000 series cars: 80 km/h (50 mph) (designed speed); 7000 series cars: 113 km/h (70 mph) (designed speed); 20 km/h (12 mph) (TfNSW limit through platforms)
- Traction system: 3000 series cars: 2 x Metropolitan-Vickers MV172 motors per carriage 7000 series cars: 4 x AEI149AZ motors per carriage Semi automatic electro-pneumatic resistance control, Series wound brushed DC traction motors
- Transmission: 3000 series cars: 58:18 Gear ratio. Straight cut gears. Wheel diameter 42 inch (1067mm); 7000 series cars: 74:17 Gear ratio. helical gears. Wheel diameter 37 inch (940mm)
- Power supply: 36vDC
- Electric system: 1,500 V DC catenary
- Current collection: Single-pan diamond pantograph
- Braking system: Westinghouse air
- Track gauge: 1,435 mm (4 ft 8 1/2 in) standard gauge

The Standard suburban carriage stock is the collective name given to a class of electric multiple units built by various manufacturers from 1924–1937 that were operated by the New South Wales Government Railways and its successors between 1926 and 1992 on the Sydney suburban network.

In the years before their withdrawal, they, along with the Tulloch and Sputnik stock, were nicknamed "Red Rattlers", a term borrowed from Melbourne in reference to the Tait trains. They were also known as 1927 type carriages.

== History ==
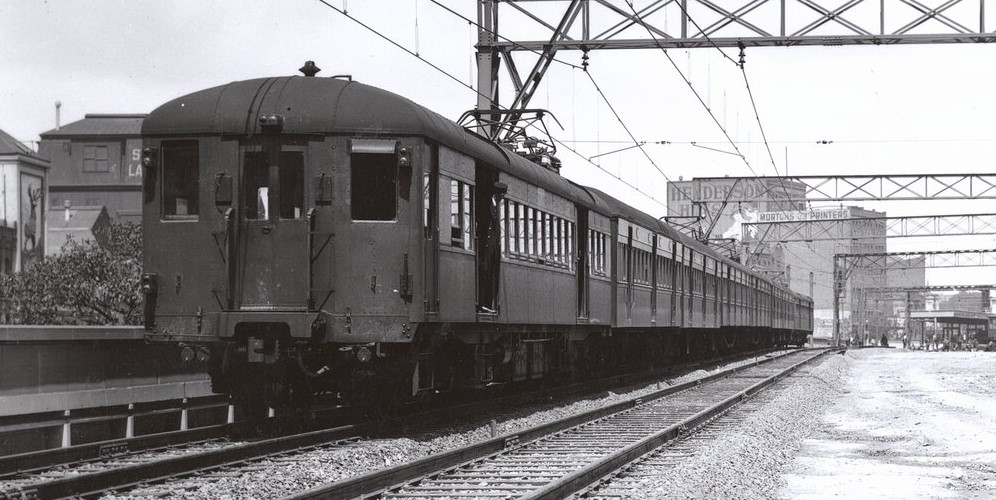
First electric train service from Central to St James, 27 April 1926

To provide rolling stock for the electrification of Sydney's suburban rail network, steel carriages were ordered.

The initial 50 power cars were built in England by Leeds Forge Company and shipped to Australia in knocked-down condition. They were assembled by Eveleigh Carriage Workshops (10) and Clyde Engineering (40) between April and October 1925.

Initially, they entered service being inserted into sets with Wooden motor carriages for haulage by steam locomotives. All these cars both timber and steel were originally numbered as first class carriages EBB2112-EBB2260 and second class carriages EFA2114-EFA2262 until the early days of electrification of the suburban network in 1926.

At this stage they were renumbered C3101 to C3150.

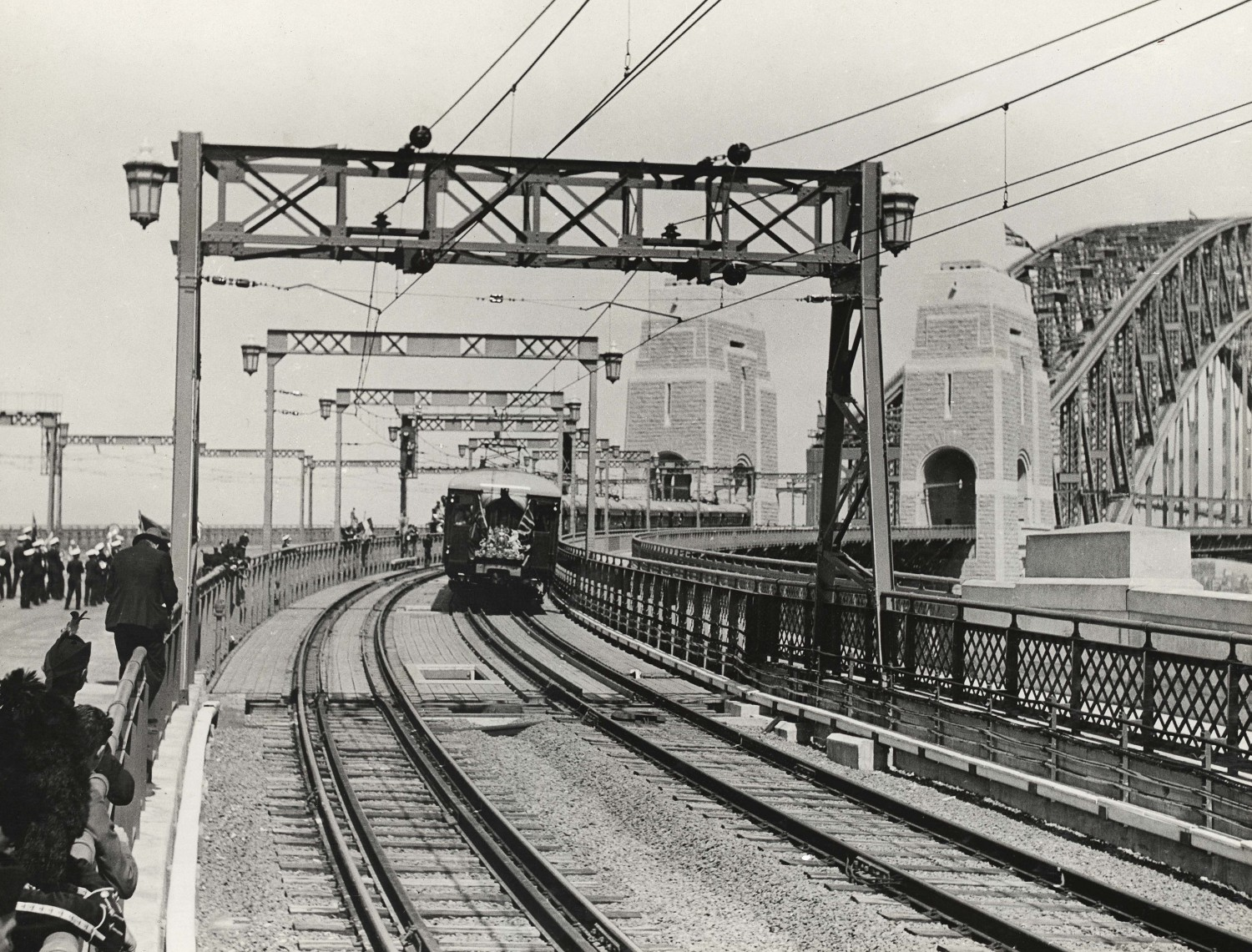
Car C3426 leading T4538, T4535, C3413, C3428, T4513, T4518 and C3417 on the first public train over the Sydney Harbour Bridge, 19 March 1932

Between 1926 and 1929, a further 290 power cars, 248 trailer cars and three parcel vans were built in Australia by Clyde Engineering and Walsh Island Dockyard. In 1937, Clyde Engineering built a further 12 power cars (C3441- C3452), to provide coverage while the 1920s built power cars were overhauled.

In 1928, Three carriages were built by Walsh Island Dockyard numbered C3901 to C3903.

These carriages would enter service as "Parcel Vans" to carry mail on the railways. For further mail transport, several other carriages from the passenger stock were converted. The first three Parcel vans would carry the numbers they were built with for most of their lives until the introduction of new double deck stock from Commonwealth Engineering requiring number changes.

The reason for the imbalance between motor and trailer cars was the conversion of some American Suburban carriage stock to operate with the new power cars. These 12 motor cars were modified with smaller windows which lead to them becoming known as "Modified Standard cars".

In 1937, six trailers (T4543-T4548) were converted to driving trailers. These cars along with the Wooden motor cars would follow the same targeting system with all trains allocated to one of four depots at Mortdale, Flemington, Punchbowl and Hornsby.

In 1984, a trio of three car sets as well as one back up train were chosen to run from Carlingford and Clyde. These were targeted Y1-Y3, which would have a mix of Standard and Tulloch cars.

Between 1968 and 1975, 45 power cars (C3302, C3304, C3306, C3308, C3310, C3314, C3332, C3335, C3336, C3339, C3356, C3365, C3367, C3369, C3372, C3373, C3375, C3376, C3382 - C3385, C3388, C3392, C3395-C3398, C3401, C3402, C3404, C3406, C3410, C3411, C3415, C3418, C3420, C3423, C3428, C3433, C3435, C3436, C3441, C3449 and C3451) were converted to 4 motors using traction equipment similar to the W sets and U sets and fitted on air suspended bogies with all having their numbers increased by 4000. A few cars also received Airmate pantographs, replacing the original Dorman Long pantographs. As built, the standard cars were painted in Tuscan red and russet with yellow pin striping. In the 1940s, that was changed to Tuscan red with buff lining. In 1957, the livery was changed to plain Tuscan red, which many cars retained until their withdrawal.

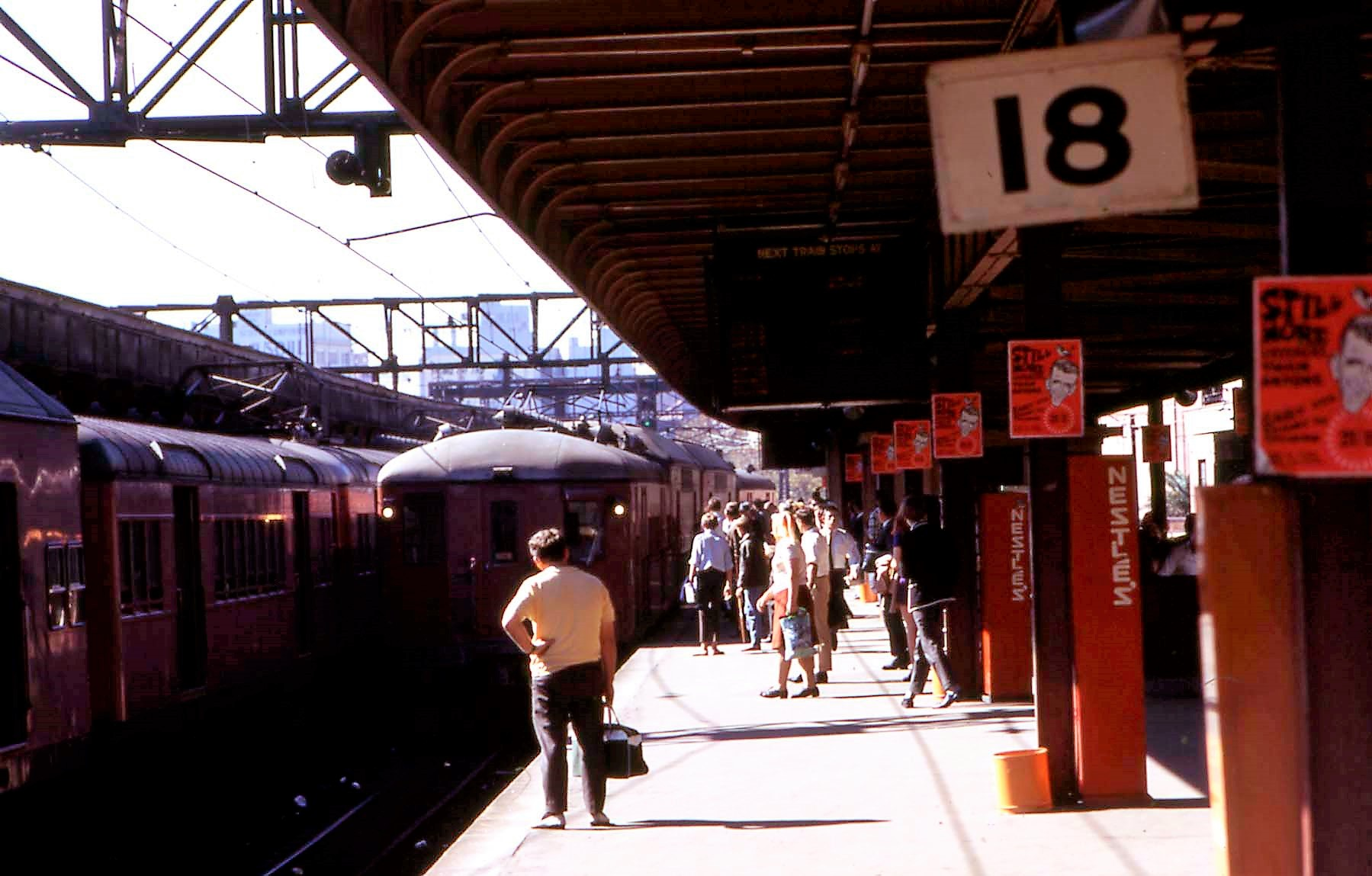
A standard trailer coupled to a Tulloch double deck trailer at Central station, Platform 18 in 1970

Some sets which were led by Standard motor cars would have Tulloch double deck trailers shuffled in with them in the 1960s. This was despite the original intent of only putting the double deck cars in Comeng sets as the power cars had better propulsion power.

Initially it was directed that only one double deck trailer would be marshalled per four car set, due to concerns about weight. However, following experimentation, this restriction was lifted and two per set became common.

From 1973, the livery became Public Transport Commission blue and white, before that was superseded by Indian red in 1976. The original cream and brown interiors were repainted in two-tone green, but that was not done to all cars.

Overhauls of the stock continued up until 1988, with some receiving sliding aluminium Beclawat windows to alleviate rust problems. In March 1991, carriages C3122, T4304, and C3330 on set "H22" were repainted in different animal themed liveries to advertise Taronga Zoo, with C3122 repainted as 'The Giraffe', T4304 as 'The Turtle' and C3330 as 'The Zebra'. This set was dubbed the "Zoo Train".

Withdrawals commenced in the 1970s, 92 remained in service with CityRail in July 1991.The last were withdrawn in 1992.

On 11 January 1992, the "Farewell City Rail's Red Single Deck Trains" Tour was hosted by the Sydney Electric Train Society or SETS, formed in 1991 specifically to preserve the suburban single deck carriages as they were retired on behalf of the State Rail Authority's "special trains unit". This tour used set "H3" (C3426, T4765, T4643, C3104, C3467, T4382, T4575 and C3237) during which it crossed the Sydney Harbour Bridge.

Many carriages would be scrapped, with the disassembly being done at many places on the rail network such as Homebush, Punchbowl, and Eveleigh.

This was likely done as a result of several single deck cars including standards as well as Tulloch and Comeng cars that were withdrawn in the same decade all being disposed of at once and the fact that over 800 single deck cars were built between 1925 and 1960. Several have been preserved.

== Construction and introduction ==
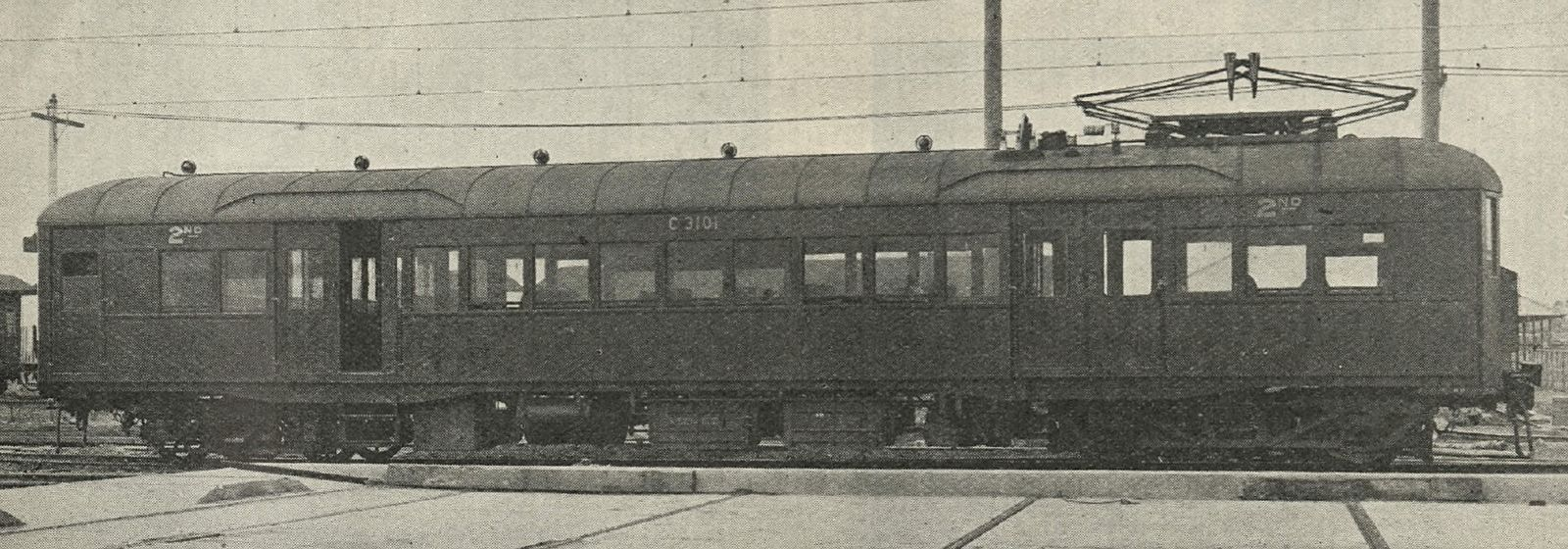
Leeds Forge built class leader C3101 in 1926

Unlike the wooden cars they served with, the standard carriages were of steel construction and only had four passenger doors on each side.

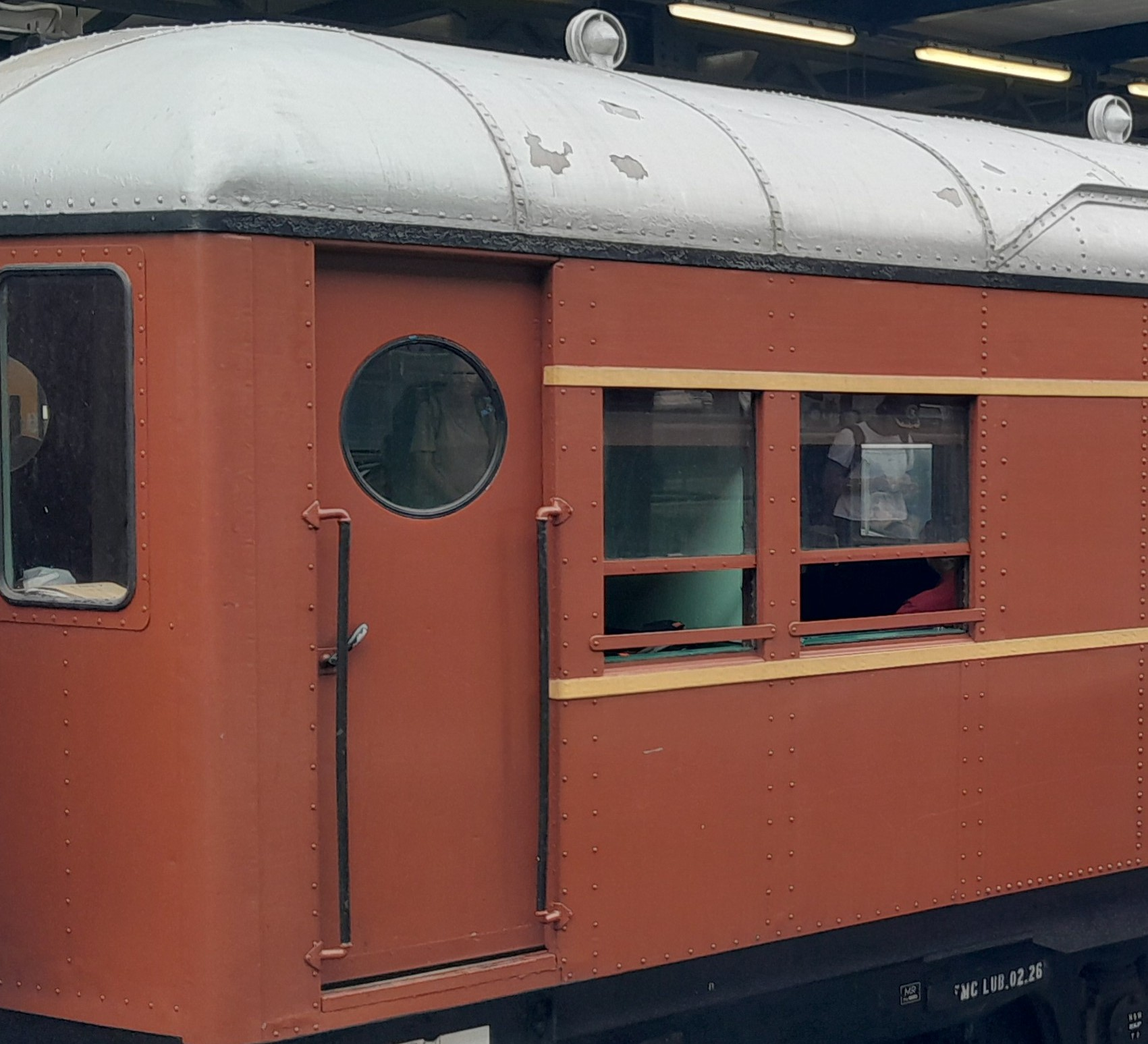
Standard trailer guards door on car T4527

The power cars were initially built with one cab door on the left side of the carriage and the trailers were built with a guard's door. Like the wooden motor cars, The standard power cars were fitted with Metropolitan-Vickers electrical equipment and two motors on the bogie below the pantograph.

The first 50 carriages were built by Leeds Forge Company in England. This choice was made as at the time; Australia had no prior experience with the construction of steel carriages.

A total of 602 carriages were built by 1937.

| Numbers | Builder | Years Built | Total | Notes |
|---|---|---|---|---|
| C3101–C3150 | Leeds Forge Company | 1925 | 50 | Initially entered service as locomotive hauled carriages EBB2213–EFA2262, except EFA222 which would be converted to electric traction, C3143 was converted into non driving motor car N0143 in August 1985 |
| C3151–C3170 | Clyde Engineering | 1926–27 | 20 | |
| C3171–C3220 | Walsh Island Dockyard | 1926–27 | 50 | C3213–C3220 entered service as trailers T3635–T3642, converted to non-control motor cars N3635–N3642 at unknown date, converted to normal motor cars between 1928 and 1929 |
| C3221–C3250 | Clyde Engineering | 1926 | 30 | C3221–C3232 & C3235–C3250 entered as non-control motors N3601–N3612 & N3615–N3630, later converted to normal motor cars between 1928 and 1929. C3233 & C3234 entered service as trailers T3613 & T3614, later converted to normal motor cars at an unknown date |
| C3251–C3300 | Walsh Island Dockyard | 1928 | 50 | |
| C3301–C3440 | Clyde Engineering | 1928–29 | 140 | |
| C3441–C3452 | Clyde Engineering | 1937 | 12 | |
| C3901–C3903 | Walsh Island Dockyard | 1928 | 3 | |
| T4301–T4548 | Walsh Island Dockyard | 1927–29 | 248 | T4543–T4548 rebuilt as driving trailers D4051–D4056 in 1937 |

All cars were assembled together via riveting to hold the carriage body together. Just like the timber cars, these carriages were fitted with a row of ventilators on the roof due to a lack of alternatives for air conditioning.

Due to the cars having manually operated doors, it was not uncommon to see the doors left open on warm days. This was also seen in the suburban cars built by Tulloch both single and double deck.

== Preservation ==
SETS made plans to run preserved carriages on the mainline for enthusiast tours. Various carriages were hidden at the depots of Hornsby, Punchbowl and Mortdale with one more stored at Elcar works.Following multiple negotiations to save these cars for heritage and after reaching an agreement for insurance to run the cars with the manual doors kept closed with Barclays, on 10 July 1993, they would run a trip with set "M1", made up of the carriages hidden at Mortdale Maintenance Centre from SRA officials and scrap metal merchants.

M1 consisted of C3218, T4527, D4673 and C3102 with all four repainted Tuscan red with buff lining. Notably, C3102 was part of Sydney's first electric train service from Oatley to Central back in 1926. It is also the oldest remaining steel motor car in the fleet. D4673 was reverted back to its first driving trailer number; D4052 in 1994. In 1995, the set was retargeted F1 and moved from Mortdale to Flemington, as they provided charting for tours, carriage certification and drivers, who trained to drive F1 with brake test van C3653.F1 would usually feature cars C3102, D4052, T4527 and C3218 with spare cars C3426 and wooden trailer T4279 added on special occasions such as the 70th and 75th anniversary of suburban electrification in 1996 and 2001. In the case of the latter, D4052 was absent and C7396 added.

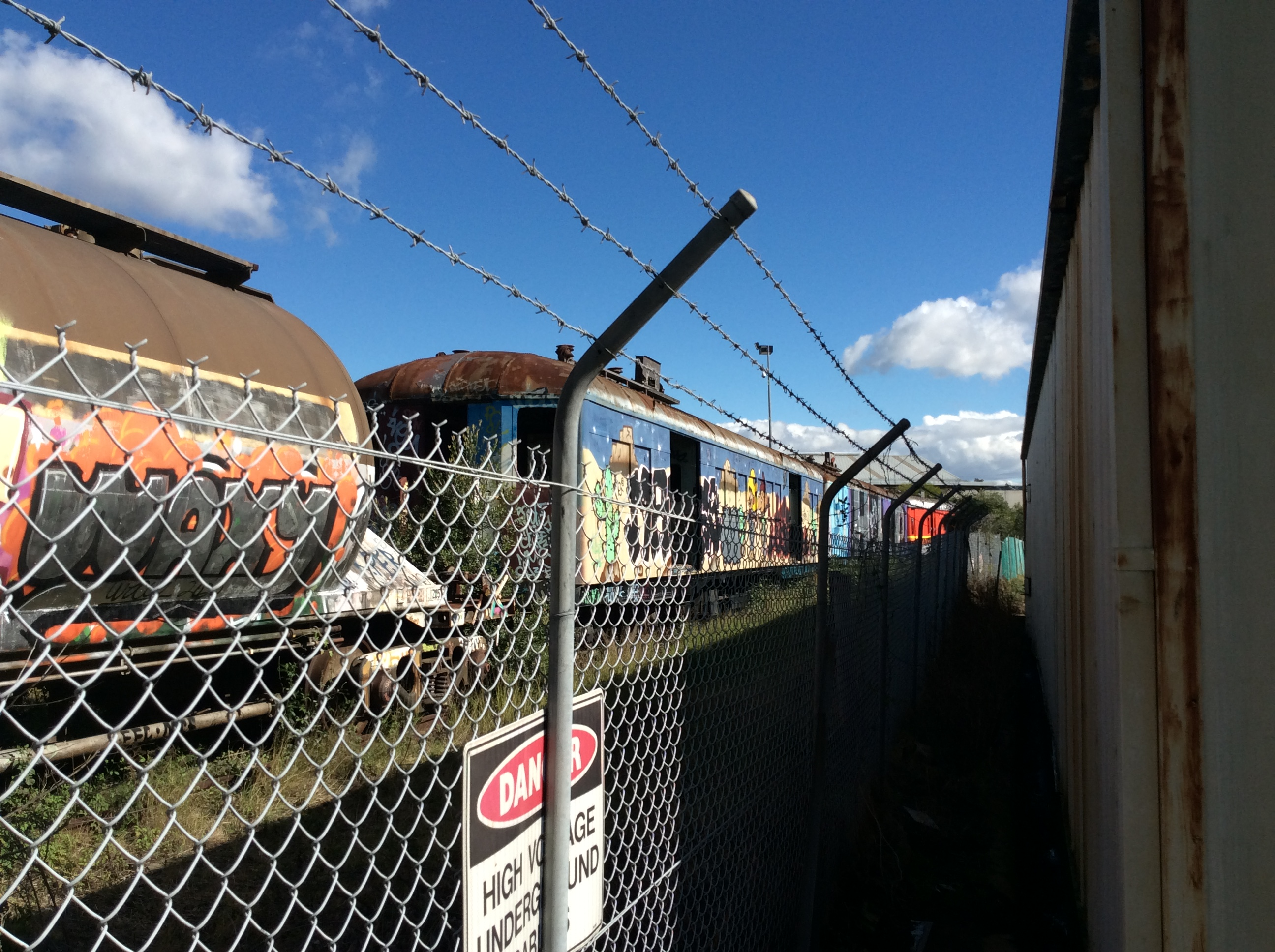
C3237, C3650 and C3660, Chullora, 2020

The cars went into the care of Historic Electric Traction (HET), formed by members of SETS that left over differences in carriage ownership in 1997. In 2002, F1 ceased operation after Barclays refused to renew the insurance needed for the manual door cars to run. Other insurers were unwilling to access or create a replacement policy. This, on top of the increased difficulty of finding qualified drivers due to C3653s relocation meant F1 would be inactive for 13 years.

SETS purchased two motor cars in 2008 from RailCorp who had put five standard carriages, plus, wooden motor car C3082 up for sale to make space. The standard cars were C3104 and C3444. All three are stored at Bilpin. C3104 was part of the second electric train service in New South Wales, and C3444 is the only surviving modified standard carriage. The other cars, C3237, C3650 and C3660 were transferred to a Chullora siding where they presently remain along side some of SETS Tulloch and W set stock, where they are significantly damaged from weather and trespassing vandals.

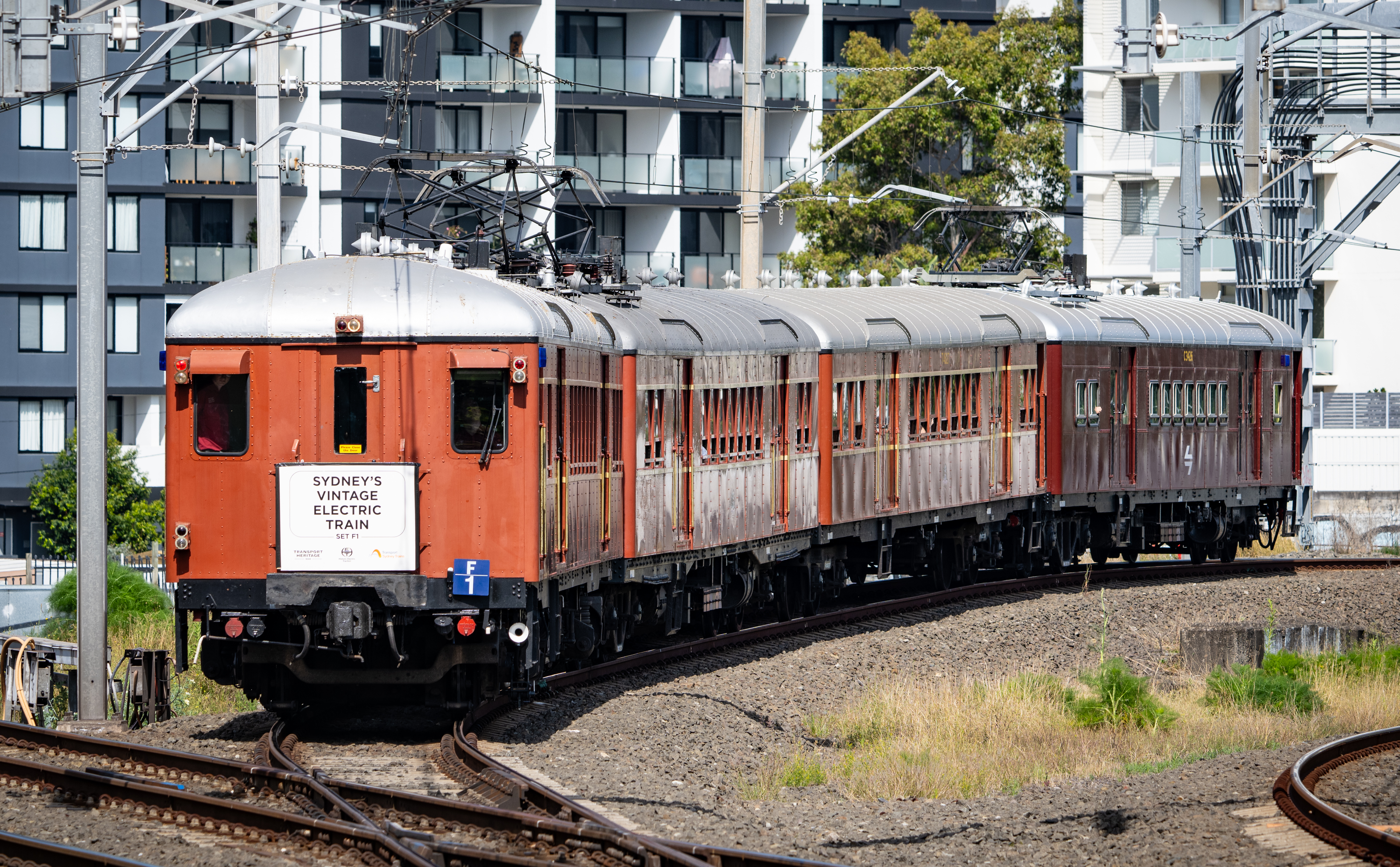
F1 at Wolli Creek in 2023

On 30 May 2015, Cars C7396, C3218, T4527, and C3426 were transferred back to Flemington to reform F1. Cars C3426 and C7396 were fitted with speedometers, a train radio and a train data logging system to meet certification requirements to lead the set. Additionally, both motor cars were fitted with a head board to avoid each end of the set being painted yellow.

F1 presently remains in operational condition. This is as a result of collaboration between Sydney Trains, Transport Heritage NSW and HET. The restored train resumed carrying passengers on 11 June 2016, 14 years since its last such trip. C3218 is the oldest carriage on the set as it was built in 1928, while the rest were built in 1929.C3426 was repainted from Tuscan to Indian Red in 2022.In early 2026, C3218 was repainted in plain Tuscan red.

Due to their width and age, Transport for NSW limits the speed of these carriages to 80 km/h (50 mph) during normal running and 20 km/h (12 mph) when passing platforms. They are further limited to running in wide loading gauge track areas only, which includes the whole suburban network, but does not include the Main North line leaving Sydney. Cars C3102 and D4052, are in storage awaiting restoration by HET with C3653.

Only one carriage remains on display, T4310, an exhibit at the NSW Rail Museum coupled between timber car C3045 and prototype car C3804. Trailer car T4408 was sold to SETS on 24 November 1998 by Cataract Scout Park at public auction, although this car is not considered part of their collection. C3167 is on display at the Dorrigo Steam Railway and Museum.

The following carriages have been retained for heritage reasons:
| Number | Image | Location | Manufactuer | Owner | Status | Notes |
|---|---|---|---|---|---|---|
| C3102 (ex. EFA2258) | | Redfern, NSW | Leeds Forge Company (Assembled by Clyde Engineering) | Transport Heritage NSW / Sydney Trains | Under restoration | |
| C3104 (ex. EBB2250) | | Bilpin, NSW | Leeds Forge Company (Assembled by Clyde Engineering) | SETS | Stored | Oldest serving carriage at the time of withdrawal with a service life of 65 years |
| C3167 | | Dorrigo, NSW | Clyde Engineering | Keith Jones | Static display | |
| C3218 (ex. N3640) | | Flemington, NSW | Walsh Island Dockyard | Transport Heritage NSW / Sydney Trains | Operational | Remains in almost original condition |
| C3237 (ex. N3617) | | Chullora, NSW | Clyde Engineering | N/A, RailCorp (formerly) | Stored | |
| C3660 (ex. C3318) | | Chullora, NSW | Clyde Engineering | N/A, RailCorp (formerly) | Stored | Nicknamed "Supercar" replacement shunting car at Hornsby for C3651 |
| C7396 (ex. C3396) | | Flemington, NSW | Clyde Engineering | Transport Heritage NSW / Sydney Trains | Operational | Planned to be scrapped at Punchbowl before being brought to Mortdale to replace a damaged Tulloch carriage in the 1990s |
| C3650 (ex. C3399) | | Chullora, NSW | Clyde Engineering | N/A, RailCorp (formerly) | Stored | Shunting car nicknamed "Bert" at Hornsby with C3651 (ex. C7385, ex. C3385) nicknamed "Ernie" |
| C3426 | | Flemington, NSW | Clyde Engineering | Transport Heritage NSW / Sydney Trains | Operational | |
| C3444 | | Bilpin, NSW | Walsh Island Dockyard | SETS | Stored | |
| C3653 (ex. C3903) | | Redfern, NSW | Walsh Island Dockyard | Transport Heritage NSW / Sydney Trains | Stored | Parcel van Additionally wore numbers C3553 and C3773 |
| T4310 | | Thirlmere, NSW | Walsh Island Dockyard | Transport Heritage NSW / Sydney Trains | Static display | |
| T4408 | | West Tamworth, NSW | Walsh Island Dockyard | SETS (Unofficial) | Stored | |
| T4506 | | Unknown | Walsh Island Dockyard | Hunter Valley Railway Trust (formerly) | Unknown | |
| T4527 | | Flemington, NSW | Walsh Island Dockyard | Transport Heritage NSW / Sydney Trains | Operational | |
| D4052 (ex. T4547) | | Redfern, NSW | Walsh Island Dockyard | Transport Heritage NSW / Sydney Trains | Stored | |

=== Private ownership ===
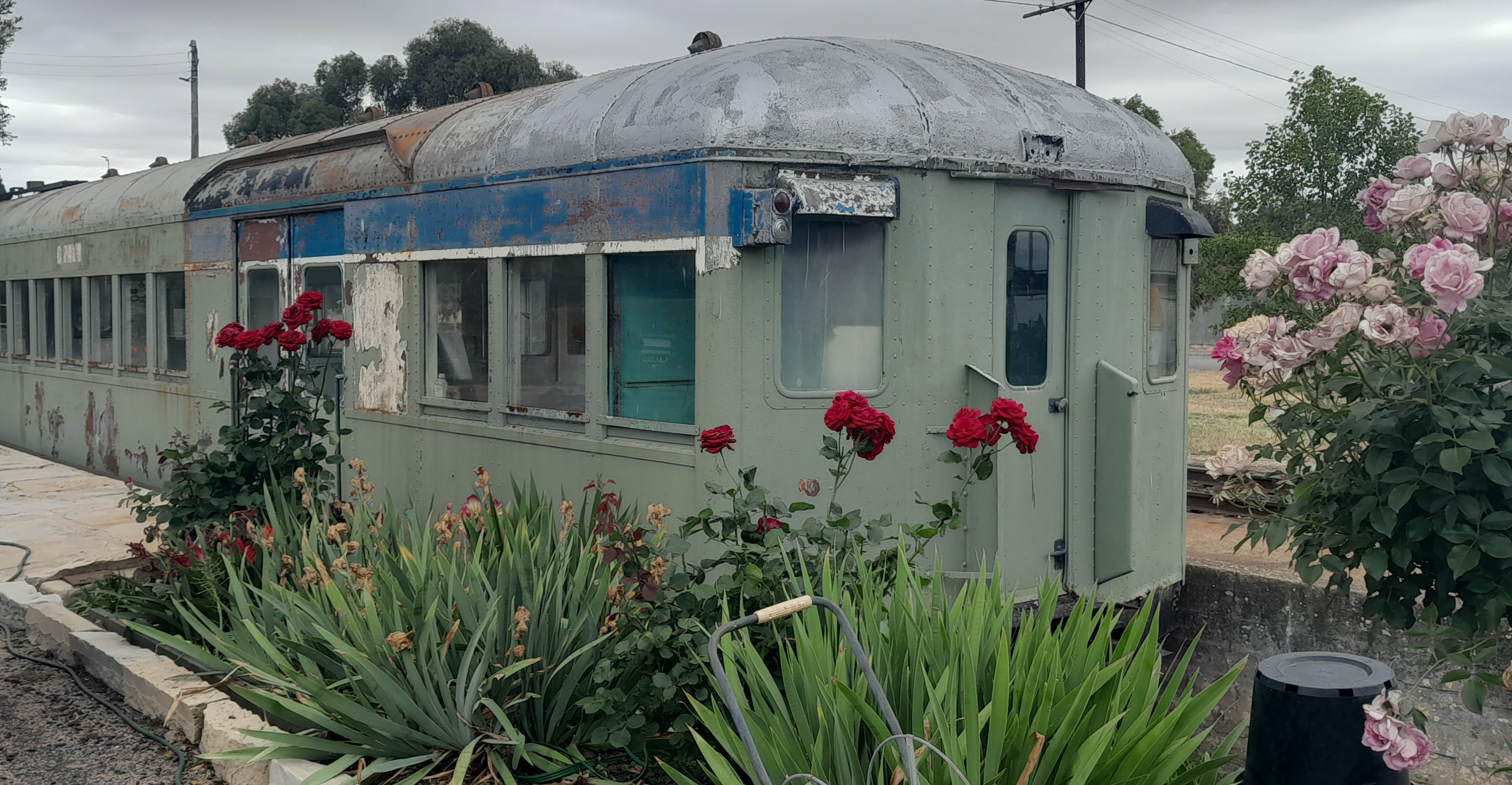
C7411 (ex. C3411) outside the Junee Roundhouse Museum in 2025

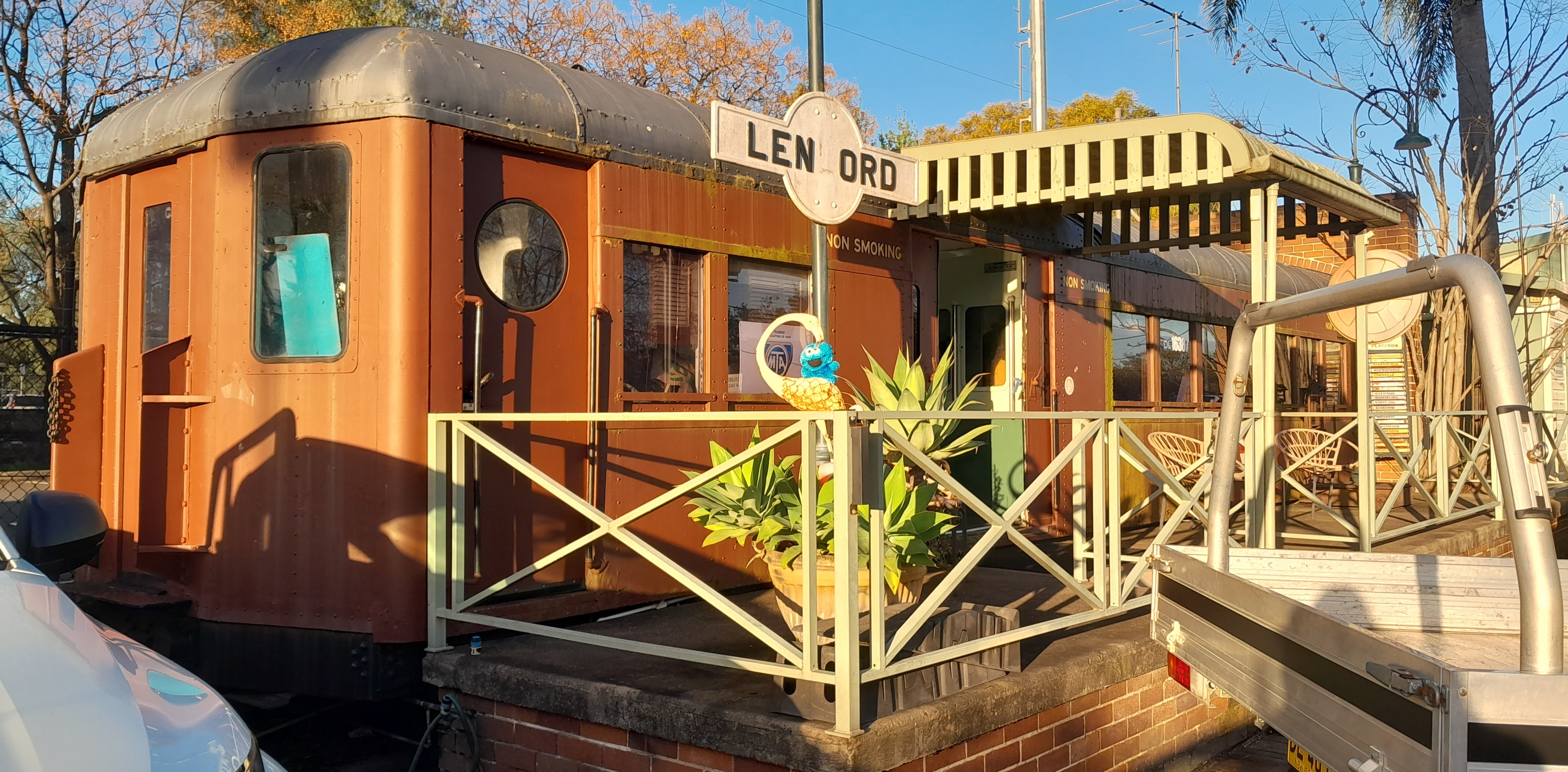
T4353 as an office building for Richmond Valley Motors in 2025

On 30 September 1985, C3279 was bought by the Scout Association of Australia Cataract Dam, but it was later scrapped.Many cars were sold via contract to Milfren Pty Ltd from 1990 to 1994 to private buyers.

Usually this would only include the body of the carriage, lacking pantographs and bogies, however there are some exceptions to these.

One of these cars, C3151, was sold on 29 June 1992 and eventually ended up in ownership of the Wattletown Junction Train Stop Cafe on the Princess Highway in Cobargo.

In 2019, the carriage was destroyed by bush fires leaving only the cab. The remains were later scrapped.

| Car Number | Builder | Date sold | Original location | Current location | Owner | Notes |
|---|---|---|---|---|---|---|
| C3105 (ex. EFA2233) | Leeds Forge Company (Assembled by Clyde Engineering) | 17/05/1990 | Mendooran, NSW | Unknown, possibly still Mendooran | Unknown | |
| C3118 (ex. EFA2224) | Leeds Forge Company (Assembled by Clyde Engineering) | 03/04/1992 | Marulan, NSW | Unknown, possibly still Marulan | Unknown | |
| C3120 (ex. EFA2229) | Leeds Forge Company (Assembled by Clyde Engineering) | 22/11/1990 | Lismore, NSW | Goulburn, NSW | Private | Private sale outside of Milfren |
| C3121 (ex. EBB2230) | Leeds Forge Company (Assembled by Clyde Engineering) | 30/11/1992 | Molong Holding Yard, NSW | Molong Holding Yard, NSW | Private | |
| C3122 (ex. EBB2215) | Leeds Forge Company (Assembled by Eveleigh Carriage Workshops) | 21/08/1992 | Taren Point, NSW, then Rylstone, NSW. | Mount Frome, NSW | "Jeffery", AirBNB host | Restored back into "The Giraffe" livery after a period in grey. |
| C3134 (ex. EBB2237) | Leeds Forge Company (Assembled by Clyde Engineering) | 13/08/1992 | Taren Point, NSW | Unknown | Unknown | |
| C3148 (ex. EBB2217) | Leeds Forge Company (Assembled by Eveleigh Carriage Workshops) | 06/05/1992 | Fremantle, NSW | Unknown | Unknown | |
| C3152 | Clyde Engineering | 06/07/1992 | Stuart Town, NSW | Unknown | Unknown | |
| C3157 | Clyde Engineering | 04/02/1992 | Campbelltown, NSW | Unknown | Unknown | |
| C3169 | Clyde Engineering | 19/05/1992 | Tallong, NSW | Unknown | Unknown | |
| C3176 | Walsh Island Dockyard | 17/06/1992 | Wellington, NSW | Unknown | Unknown | |
| C3183 | Walsh Island Dockyard | 09/06/1992 | Bonnyrigg, NSW | Kurrajong, NSW | Madison's Mountain Retreat | Restored into Cityrail paintscheme as of 2019. Damaged by bushfires as of 2021. |
| C3191 | Walsh Island Dockyard | 04/09/1992 | Dubbo, NSW | Unknown | Unknown | |
| C3196 | Walsh Island Dockyard | 12/03/1992 | Nowra, NSW | Unknown | Formerly Barbeques Galore, Nowra | |
| C3198 | Walsh Island Dockyard | 01/06/1992 | Wellington, NSW | Mitchell Highway | A plant nursery | |
| C3200 | Walsh Island Dockyard | 22/02/1992 | Catherine Field, NSW | Unknown | Unknown | |
| C3212 (ex. N3634) | Walsh Island Dockyard | 10/02/1993 | Minto, NSW | Unknown | Unknown | |
| C3216 (ex. N3638) | Walsh Island Dockyard | 13/03/1992 | Nowra, NSW | Unknown | Formerly Barbeques Galore, Nowra | |
| C3221 (ex. N3601) | Clyde Engineering | 19/06/1992 | Hay, NSW | Unknown | Unknown | |
| C3223 (ex. N3603) | Clyde Engineering | 26/02/1992 | Muswellbrook, NSW | Unknown | Unknown | |
| C3234 (ex. N3614) | Clyde Engineering | 24/08/1992 | Penola, SA | Unknown | Unknown | |
| C3244 (ex. N3624) | Clyde Engineering | 13/11/1992 | Armatree, NSW | Unknown | Unknown | Repainted white |
| C3245 (ex. N3625) | Clyde Engineering | 28/04/1992 | Waling, NSW | Unknown | Unknown | |
| C3247 (ex. N3627) | Clyde Engineering | 30/06/1992 | Penola, SA | Unknown | Unknown | |
| C3250 (ex. N3630 | Clyde Engineering | 10/09/1992 | Narromine, NSW | Unknown | Unknown | |
| C3251 | Walsh Island Dockyard | 17/01/1992 | Kurrajong, NSW | Kurrajong, NSW | Madison's Mountain Retreat | Restored into Cityrail paintscheme as of 2013. Damaged by bushfires as of 2021. |
| C3255 | Walsh Island Dockyard | 14/07/1990 | Dungay, NSW | Dungay, NSW | Red Rattlers Dungay | |
| C3256 | Walsh Island Dockyard | 28/02/1992 | Coolatai, NSW | Yetman, NSW | Unknown | |
| C3259 | Walsh Island Dockyard | 12/07/1990 | Lightning Ridge, NSW | Unknown, possibly still at Lightning Ridge | (Possibly) Red Rattler Camp | |
| C3261 | Walsh Island Dockyard | 14/07/1990 | Dungay, NSW | Dungay, NSW | Red Rattlers Dungay | Used as a cafe, still retains original seating |
| C3266 | Walsh Island Dockyard | 12/06/1992 | Bredbo, NSW | Bredbo, NSW | Paddington Hills Rural Retreat | |
| C3273 | Walsh Island Dockyard | 21/10/1992 | Dungog, NSW | Dungog, NSW | Carriageway | One of 4 carriages, currently used as the restaurant. Formerly wore a special livery for the opening of the Opera House in October 1973. |
| C3276 | Walsh Island Dockyard | 11/03/1994 | Oberon, NSW | Oberon, NSW | Private | Still retains pantograph, withdrawn in 1978 for use at the Apprentice Training College in Chullora. |
| C3652 (ex.C3283) | Walsh Island Dockyard | ? | Molong Holding Yard, NSW | Molong Holding Yard, NSW | Private | Converted into wash plant shunter "Bugsy" in 29/07/1991. Private sale outside of Milfren |
| C3284 | Walsh Island Dockyard | 17/08/1993 | Yowah, Qld | Unknown, possibly still at Yowah | Unknown | |
| C3286 | Walsh Island Dockyard | 11/02/1993 | Peats Ridge, NSW | Wellington, NSW | Private | |
| C3287 | Walsh Island Dockyard | 30/01/1992 | Rocklea, NSW | Newbridge (Caloola St), NSW | Private | |
| C3288 | Walsh Island Dockyard | 11/03/1994 | Castlereagh, NSW | Cranebrook, NSW | Private | |
| C3289 | Walsh Island Dockyard | 19/04/1994 | Orange, NSW | Unknown | Unknown | |
| C3290 | Walsh Island Dockyard | 05/03/1993 | Illabo, NSW | Taree, NSW | Geoff Willis | Currently rests on top of a set of Sputnik bogies. |
| C7304 (ex. C3304) | Clyde Engineering | 23/07/1993 | Unknown | Unknown | Unknown | |
| C7306 (ex. C3306) | Clyde Engineering | 17/06/1992 | Townsville, NSW | Unknown | Unknown | |
| C7308 (ex. C3308) | Clyde Engineering | 09/11/1992 | Canberra, NSW | Unknown | Unknown | |
| C7314 (ex. C3314) | Clyde Engineering | 16/07/1992 | Lightning Ridge, NSW | Unknown | Unknown | |
| C3330 | Clyde Engineering | 28/08/1992 | Mendooren, NSW | Unknown | Unknown | |
| C3334 | Clyde Engineering | ? | Dungog, NSW | Dungog, NSW | Carriageway | |
| C7335 (ex. C3335) | Clyde Engineering | 18/02/1992 | Kelso, NSW | Unknown | Unknown | |
| C7339 (ex. C3339) | Clyde Engineering | 27/07/1992 | Lightning Ridge, NSW | Lightning Ridge, NSW | Private | |
| C3340 | Clyde Engineering | 22/06/1992 | Blayney, NSW | Unknown | Unknown | |
| C7356 (ex. C3356) | Clyde Engineering | 14/05/1992 | Lisarow, NSW | Unknown | Unknown | |
| C3359 | Clyde Engineering | 26/07/1993 | Freeman's Wtr, NSW | Unknown | Unknown | |
| C7365 (ex. C3365) | Clyde Engineering | 11/12/1992 | Lightning Ridge, NSW | Unknown | Unknown | |
| C7367 (ex. C3367) | Clyde Engineering | 03/12/1992 | Tottenham, NSW | Unknown | Unknown | |
| C7369 (ex. C3369) | Clyde Engineering | 12/10/1992 | Dubbo, NSW | Unknown | Unknown | |
| C7373 (ex. C3373) | Clyde Engineering | 31/07/1992 | Tabulum, NSW | Unknown | Unknown | |
| C7376 (ex. C3376) | Clyde Engineering | 23/10/1992 | North Bourke, NSW | Unknown | Unknown | |
| C3381 | Clyde Engineering | 06/04/1992 | Running Strm, NSW | Unknown | Unknown | |
| C7383 (ex. C3383) | Clyde Engineering | 21/08/1992 | Tooraweemalah, NSW | Unknown | Unknown | |
| C7384 (ex. C3384) | Clyde Engineering | 21/05/1992 | Lake Bathurst (Braidwood Road), NSW | Unknown | Unknown | |
| C3386 | Clyde Engineering | 11/12/1992 | Lightning Ridge, NSW | Unknown | Unknown | |
| C7388 (ex. C3388) | Clyde Engineering | 23/06/1993 | South Grafton, NSW | Unknown | Unknown | Last carriage withdrawn |
| C3391 | Clyde Engineering | 09/03/1992 | Moree, NSW | Unknown | Unknown | |
| C7392 (ex. C3392) | Clyde Engineering | 10/11/1992 | Lightning Ridge, NSW | Unknown | Unknown | |
| C7397 (ex. C3397) | Clyde Engineering | 16/07/1992 | Mudgee, NSW | Unknown | Unknown | |
| C7398 (ex. C3398) | Clyde Engineering | 25/06/1992 | Nowra, NSW | Unknown | Unknown | |
| C7401 (ex. C3401) | Clyde Engineering | 28/05/1992 | Lightning Ridge, NSW | Lightning Ridge, NSW | Private | |
| C7410 (ex. C3410) | Clyde Engineering | 06/04/1992 | Mulgoa, NSW | Unknown | Unknown | |
| C7411 (ex. C3411) | Clyde Engineering | 12/07/1993 | Bega, NSW | Junee, NSW | Junee Roundhouse Museum? | |
| C3412 | Clyde Engineering | 14/10/1992 | Camden, NSW | Unknown | Unknown | |
| C7415 (ex. C3415) | Clyde Engineering | 21/07/1992 | Harden, NSW | Unknown | Unknown | |
| C7418 (ex. C3418) | Clyde Engineering | 03/12/1992 | Campbellfield, NSW | Unknown | Unknown | |
| C3424 | Clyde Engineering | 01/03/1993 | Lithgow, NSW | Unknown | Unknown | |
| C7428 (ex. C3428) | Clyde Engineering | 10/06/1992 | Mudgee, NSW | Windeyer, NSW | Bushlands Tourist Park | |
| C3431 | Clyde Engineering | 08/05/1992 | Molong, NSW | Unknown | Unknown | |
| C3432 | Clyde Engineering | 07/08/1992 | Eromanga, Qld | Unknown | Unknown | |
| C7433 (ex. C3433) | Clyde Engineering | 0508/1992 | Coonabarabran, NSW | Unknown | Unknown | |
| C7435 (ex. C3435) | Clyde Engineering | 25/06/1992 | Fremantle, WA | Unknown | Unknown | |
| C3437 | Clyde Engineering | 26/06/1992 | Lightning Ridge, NSW | Unknown | Unknown | |
| C7441 (ex. C3441) | Clyde Engineering | 22/07/1992 | Harden, NSW | Unknown | Unknown | |
| C3446 | Clyde Engineering | 12/06/1992 | Windeyer, NSW (formerly Ilford, NSW) | Windeyer, NSW | Ba Macks Homestead | |
| C3447 | Clyde Engineering | 12/05/1992 | Orange, NSW | Unknown | Unknown | |
| C7451 (ex. C3451) | Clyde Engineering | ? | Dubbo (Newell Highway), NSW | Unknown | Unknown | |
| T4301 | Walsh Island Dockyard | ? | Unknown | Unknown | Mario Mencingar | |
| T4315 | Walsh Island Dockyard | 25/02/1993 | Vralla, NSW | Unknown | Unknown | |
| T4322 | Walsh Island Dockyard | 15/06/1992 | Gundaroo, NSW | Unknown | Unknown | |
| T4335 | Walsh Island Dockyard | 05/04/1993 | Vralla, NSW | Unknown | Unknown | |
| T4345 | Walsh Island Dockyard | 31/07/1992 | Tambulum, NSW | Unknown | Unknown | |
| T4353 | Walsh Island Dockyard | ? | Richmond, NSW | Richmond, NSW | Richmond Valley Motors | |
| T4355 | Walsh Island Dockyard | 17/07/1992 | Mudgee, NSW | Mudgee, NSW | Unknown | Sold as of 01/07/2025 |
| T4357 | Walsh Island Dockyard | ? | Campbelltown, NSW | Unknown | Unknown | Canteen for the Campbelltown steam museum |
| T4364 | Walsh Island Dockyard | ? | Unknown | Near, Couridjah NSW | Tharawal aboriginal mission (formerly) | |
| T4369 | Walsh Island Dockyard | 11/09/1992 | Yowah, Qld | Unknown | Unknown | |
| T4374 | Walsh Island Dockyard | 14/08/1992 | Ballimore, NSW | Unknown | Unknown | |
| T4386 | Walsh Island Dockyard | 14/05/1992 | Newcastle, NSW | Unknown | Unknown | |
| T4388 | Walsh Island Dockyard | 19/02/1992 | Wallaroo, NSW (formerly Queanbeyan, NSW) | Wallaroo, NSW | The Last Stop Ambledown Brook | |
| T4395 | Walsh Island Dockyard | 18/03/1992 | Collector, NSW | Unknown | Unknown | |
| T4397 | Walsh Island Dockyard | 23/10/1992 | Bourke, NSW | Unknown | Unknown | |
| T4398 | Walsh Island Dockyard | ? | Unknown | Near, Couridjah NSW | Tharawal aboriginal mission (formerly) | |
| T4399 | Walsh Island Dockyard | 01/10/1992 | Molong, NSW | Unknown | Unknown | |
| T4405 | Walsh island Dockyard | 10/05/1992 | Vralla, NSW | Unknown | Unknown | |
| T4414 | Walsh Island Dockyard | 26/04/1992 | Stuart Town, NSW | Unknown | Unknown | |
| T4417 | Walsh Island Dockyard | ? | Unknown | Near, Couridjah NSW | Tharawal aboriginal mission (formerly) | |
| T4428 | Walsh Island Dockyard | 10/04/1992 | Corys, NSW | Unknown | Unknown | |
| T4430 | Walsh Island Dockyard | 04/05/1992 | Mendooren, NSW | Unknown | Unknown | |
| T4431 | Walsh Island Dockyard | 27/01/1992 | Nowra, NSW | Unknown | Unknown | |
| T4442 | Walsh Island Dockyard | 23/091992 | Nowra, NSW | Unknown | Unknown | |
| T4444 | Walsh Island Dockyard | 04/11/1992 | North Bourke, NSW | Unknown | Unknown | |
| T4446 | Walsh Island Dockyard | 28/08/1992 | Mendooren, NSW | Unknown | Unknown | |
| T4455 | Walsh Island Dockyard | 28/10/1992 | Fairbairn, NSW | Unknown | Unknown | |
| T4456 | Walsh Island Dockyard | 26/04/1992 | Mudgee, NSW | Unknown | Unknown | |
| T4458 | Walsh Island Dockyard | ? | Unknown | 112 Wyaldra Lane, Mudgee, NSW | For sale | |
| T4465 | Walsh Island Dockyard | 03/03/1992 | Braidwood, NSW | Unknown | Unknown | |
| T4473 | Walsh Island Dockyard | 20/01/1992 | Dubbo, NSW | Unknown | Unknown | |
| T4475 | Walsh Island Dockyard | 29/01/1992 | Marluran, NSW | Unknown | Unknown | |
| T4476 | Walsh Island Dockyard | 30/04/1992 | Rockley, NSW | Unknown | Unknown | |
| T4486 | Walsh Island Dockyard | ? | Unknown | Near, Couridjah NSW | Tharawal aboriginal mission (formerly) | |
| T4497 | Walsh Island Dockyard | 30/03/1992 | Wallerawang, NSW | Unknown | Unknown | |
| T4509 | Walsh Island Dockyard | 21/02/1992 | Clarence, NSW | Unknown | Unknown | |
| T4514 | Walsh Island Dockyard | 26/11/1992 | Lightning Ridge, NSW | Unknown | Unknown | |
| T4521 | Walsh Island Dockyard | 24/04/1992 | Yetholme, NSW | Unknown | Unknown | |
| T4523 | Walsh Island Dockyard | 02/07/1992 | Lyndhurst, NSW | Unknown | Unknown | |
| T4537 | Walsh Island Dockyard | 16/10/1992 | Brewarrina, NSW | Unknown | Unknown | |
| T4539 | Walsh Island Dockyard | ? | Unknown | Near, Couridjah NSW | Tharawal aboriginal mission (formerly) | |
| D4674 (ex. T4543) | Walsh Island Dockyard | ? | Unknown | Near, Couridjah NSW | Tharawal aboriginal mission (formerly) | |
