= HMAS Tolga =

Royal Australian Navy auxiliary minesweeper

History

Australia
- Name: Dorlonco (1925–1926); Sir T. Hugh Bell (1926–1930); Tolga (1930–1946)
- Owner: Dorman Long, Sydney (1925–1930); Adelaide Steamship Company (1930–1946)
- Builder: Walsh Island Dockyard & Engineering Works, Newcastle
- Launched: 1925
- Identification: UK Identification Number: 152004
- Fate: Sold in 1946.

History

Australia
- Name: Tolga
- Decommissioned: 3 March 1946
- Honours and awards: Battle honours: Darwin 1942–43
- Fate: Scuttled in 1946

General characteristics
- Tonnage: 418 gross register tons
- Length: 147 ft (45 m)
- Beam: 26.6 ft (8.1 m)
- Draught: 9.2 ft (2.8 m)
- Propulsion: Triple expansion engine

HMAS Tolga was an auxiliary minesweeper which served in the Royal Australian Navy (RAN) during World War II.

Tolga was built in 1925 by the Walsh Island Dockyard & Engineering Works, Newcastle for Dorman Long, Sydney as Dorlonco. She was renamed in Sydney as the Sir T. Hugh Bell in 1926. She was sold to the Adelaide Steamship Company in 1930 and renamed Tolga. She was utilised along the Queensland coast as a sugar lighter between shore to larger vessels offshore. Tolga was requisitioned by the RAN in 1940 and commissioned as an auxiliary minesweeper. She was attached to Minesweeping Group 70, based at Darwin. In 1942, she was converted to a water carriers and later as a stores carrier. Purchased by the RAN in 1946, she was paid off on 3 March 1946. Surveys determined that she had deteriorated and was structurally unsafe to transport back to Australia.

== Fate ==
Tolga was towed out to sea by the frigate HMAS Condamine on 30 April 1946 and was scuttled off the north coast of New Guinea.

== Battle honours ==
Following an overhaul of the RAN battle honours system, completed in March 2010, Tolga's wartime service was retroactively recognised with the honour "Darwin 1942–43".
