= HMAS Kuttabul (ship) =

Ferry sunk in Sydney Harbour during World War II

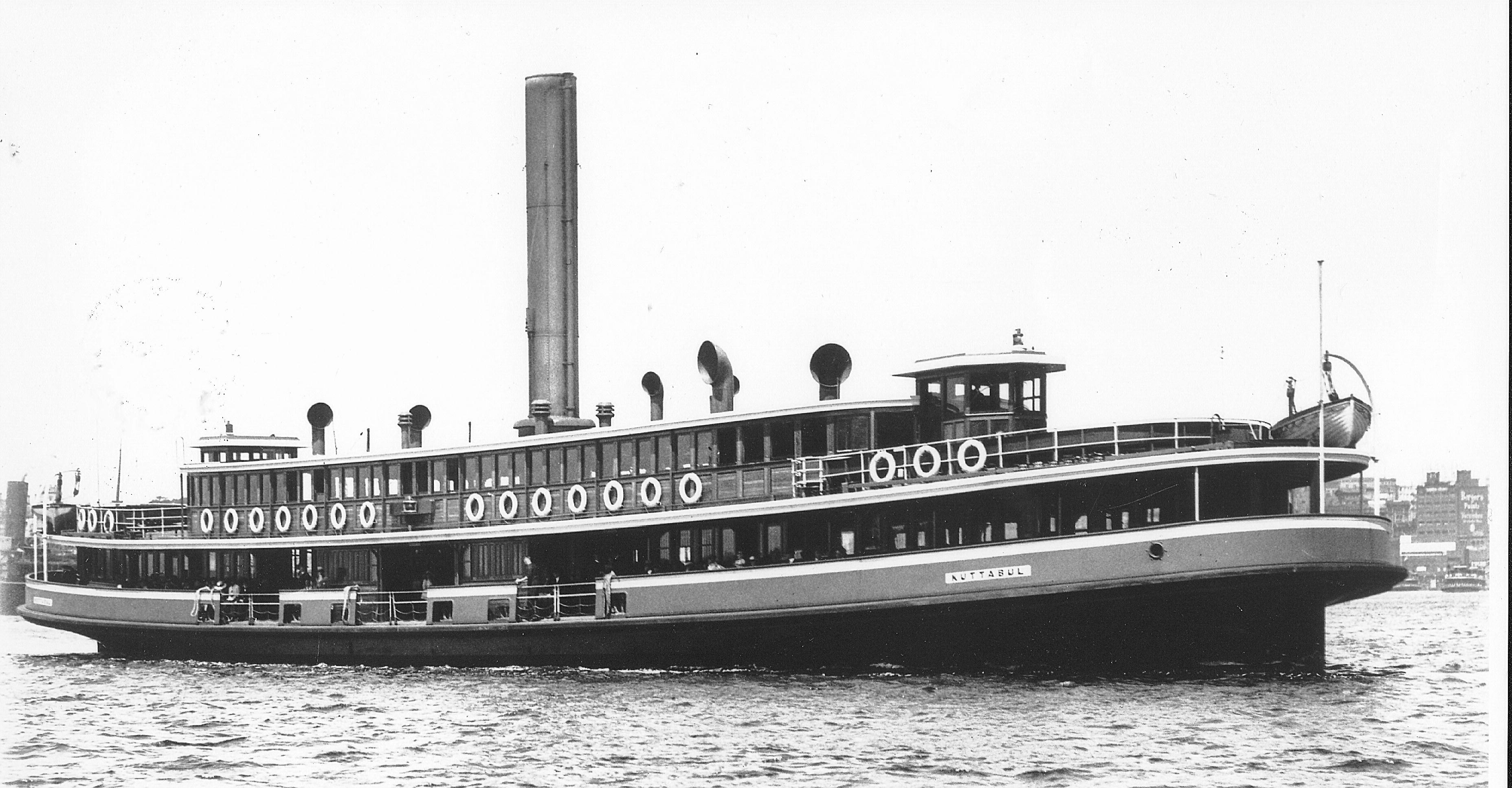
- Kuttabul as built. 1922

History

Australia
- Name: Kuttabul
- Namesake: Aboriginal word meaning wonderful
- Owner: Sydney Ferries Limited
- Port of registry: Sydney
- Route: Circular Quay-Milsons Point
- Builder: Walsh Island Dockyard and Engineering Works, Newcastle
- Yard number: 54
- In service: 1922
- Out of service: 1940

Australia
- Name: HMAS Kuttabul
- Owner: Royal Australian Navy
- Acquired: 7 November 1940
- Commissioned: 26 February 1941
- Identification: O/N 150185
- Fate: Sunk 1 June 1942

General characteristics
- Type: Harbour ferry
- Tonnage: 447 GRT
- Length: 183 ft (56 m)
- Beam: 36.9 ft (11.2 m)
- Capacity: 2,250

HMAS Kuttabul, formerly SS Kuttabul, was a Royal Australian Navy depot ship, converted from a Sydney Ferries Limited ferry.

Kuttabul and her identical sistership, Koompartoo, were the largest and last K-class ferries built. Kuttabul had the highest passenger carrying capacity of any ferry on Sydney Harbour and was ordered for the crowded Milsons Point to Circular Quay route.

During the Japanese midget submarine attack on Sydney Harbour on 31 May 1942, Kuttabul was sunk, with 21 naval personnel aboard.

== Design and construction ==
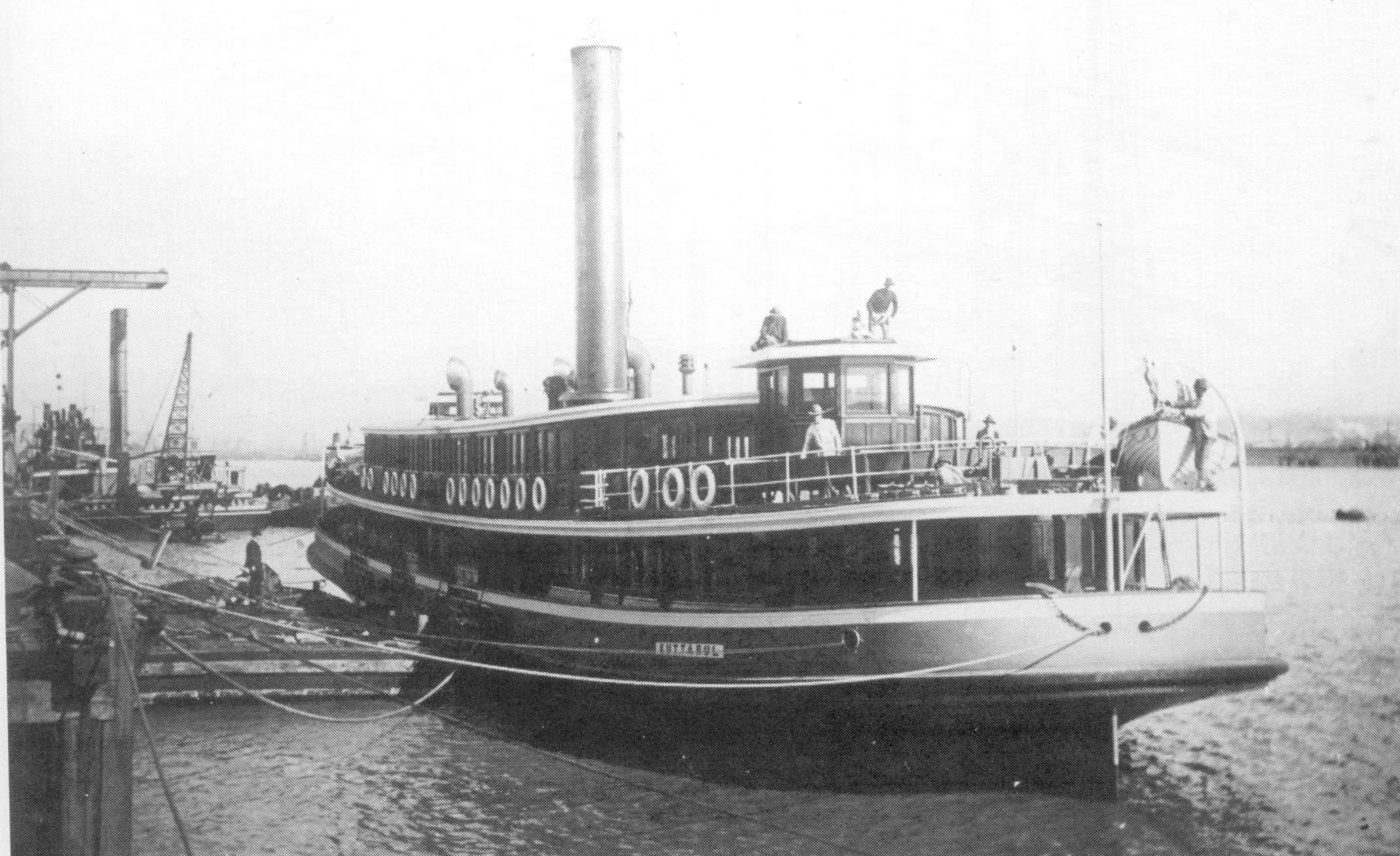
Kuttabul being fitted out at Walsh Island Dockyard and Engineering Works, 1922

To service the booming population growth on the North Shore prior to the construction of a bridge connection, Sydney Ferries Limited ordered the largest, and what would be the last, "K-class" ferries. They were Kuttabul and Koompartoo, steam-powered ferries, built in 1922 by the Walsh Island Dockyard and Engineering Works in Newcastle. Similar in size to Manly ferries, they were rated at 448 gross and 201 net register tons (1269 and 569 m³), and were 183 feet (56 m) long, with a beam of 36 feet (11 m). They were the largest ferries ever operated on the inner harbour ferry routes, though Kuttabul had a larger passenger capacity (2,250) than Koompartoo (2,089). Their passenger capacity was the largest ever of any ferry on Sydney Harbour, exceeding even the largest Manly ferries by 500 passengers, a record that has not been beaten by any subsequent ferry.

Both ferries were of steel construction with a wooden superstructure. Both vessels were constructed with 18 watertight compartments, regarded as being unsinkable and therefore were not required to carry life-saving equipment.

== Sydney Ferries ==
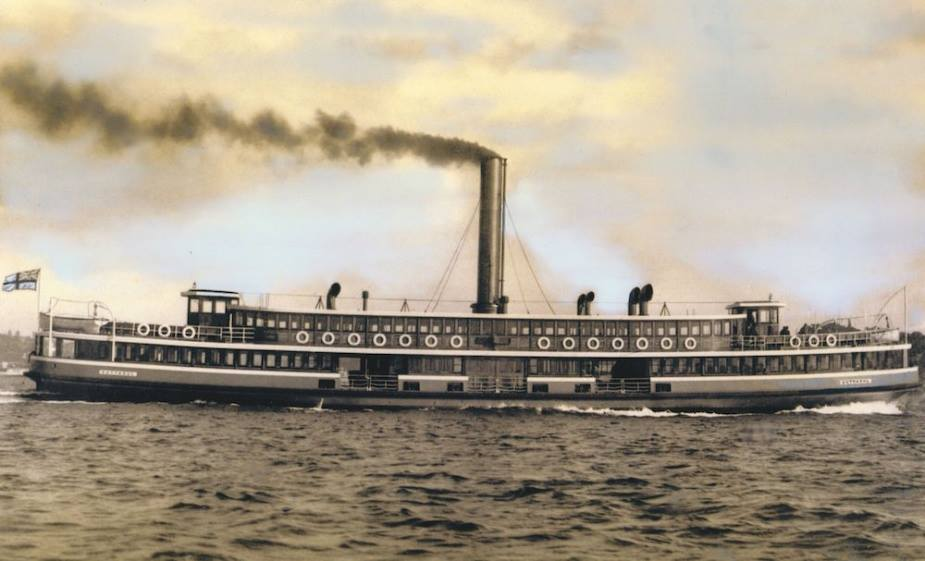
Kuttabul as a Sydney Ferries Limited K-class steamer

Kuttabul and Koompartoo had been ordered specifically for the short heavy lift commuter link across the harbour between Circular Quay and Milsons Point, a route that was approximately aligned with the location of the pending Sydney Harbour Bridge. Prior to the opening of the bridge, peak hour ferries were leaving either side of the harbour at the rate of one fully loaded vessel every six minutes. Supporting the large steel hulled twins, were usually the timber "K-class" Kuramia (1914), Kai Kai, and Kulgoa.

With the opening of the Sydney Harbour Bridge in 1932, the route became redundant. Kuttabul and Koompartoo were considered too big to be used on other routes and were laid up, but were later made available for tourist cruises on the harbour. The Milsons Point wharf used by these ferries is now part of Luna Park.

== Royal Australian Navy and sinking ==
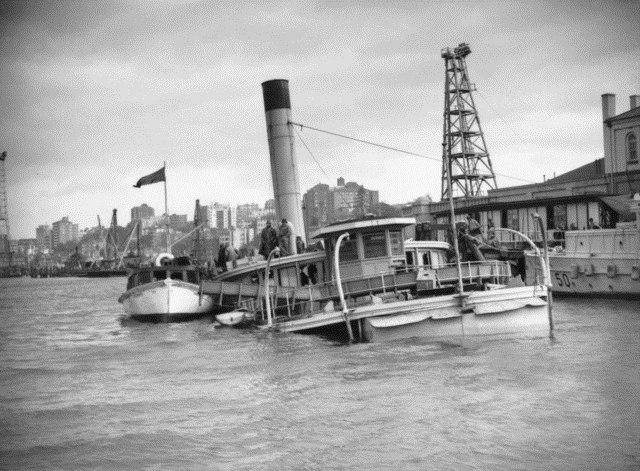
Kuttabul after sinking

After the outbreak of World War II, Kuttabul was requisitioned by the Royal Australian Navy on 7 November 1940, and moored at the Garden Island naval base to provide accommodation for Allied naval personnel while they awaited transfer to their ships.

On the night of 31 May/1 June 1942, three Ko-hyoteki class midget submarines of the Imperial Japanese Navy entered Sydney Harbour with the intention of attacking Allied warships. According to the official account, only one of the submarines, designated M-24, was able to fire her torpedoes, but both missed their intended target: the heavy cruiser USS Chicago. The torpedoes, fired around 00:30, continued on to Garden Island: one ran aground harmlessly, but the other hit the breakwater against which Kuttabul and the Dutch submarine K-IX were moored.

The attack killed 19 Royal Australian Navy and two Royal Navy sailors asleep aboard the ferry, and wounded another 10. It took several days for the bodies of the dead sailors to be recovered, with a burial ceremony held on 3 June. One of the ferry's wheelhouses was salvaged and used as a naval police guardhouse at the Garden Island naval base; the base was commissioned on 1 January 1943 as the stone frigate HMAS Kuttabul in commemoration of the ferry and the lives lost. The wheelhouse later came into the possession of the Australian War Memorial, and is on display alongside a composite submarine built from the wreckage of two of the Japanese midget submarines.

== Chronological gallery ==
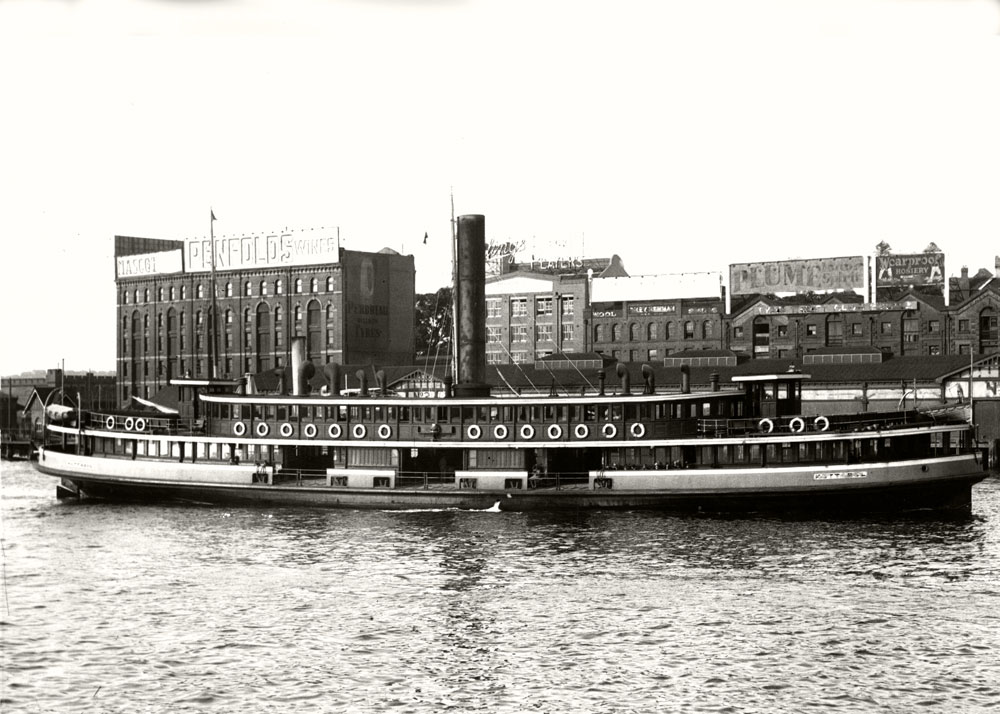
In her original as-built livery of varnished timber, grey hull, black funnel, and white trim

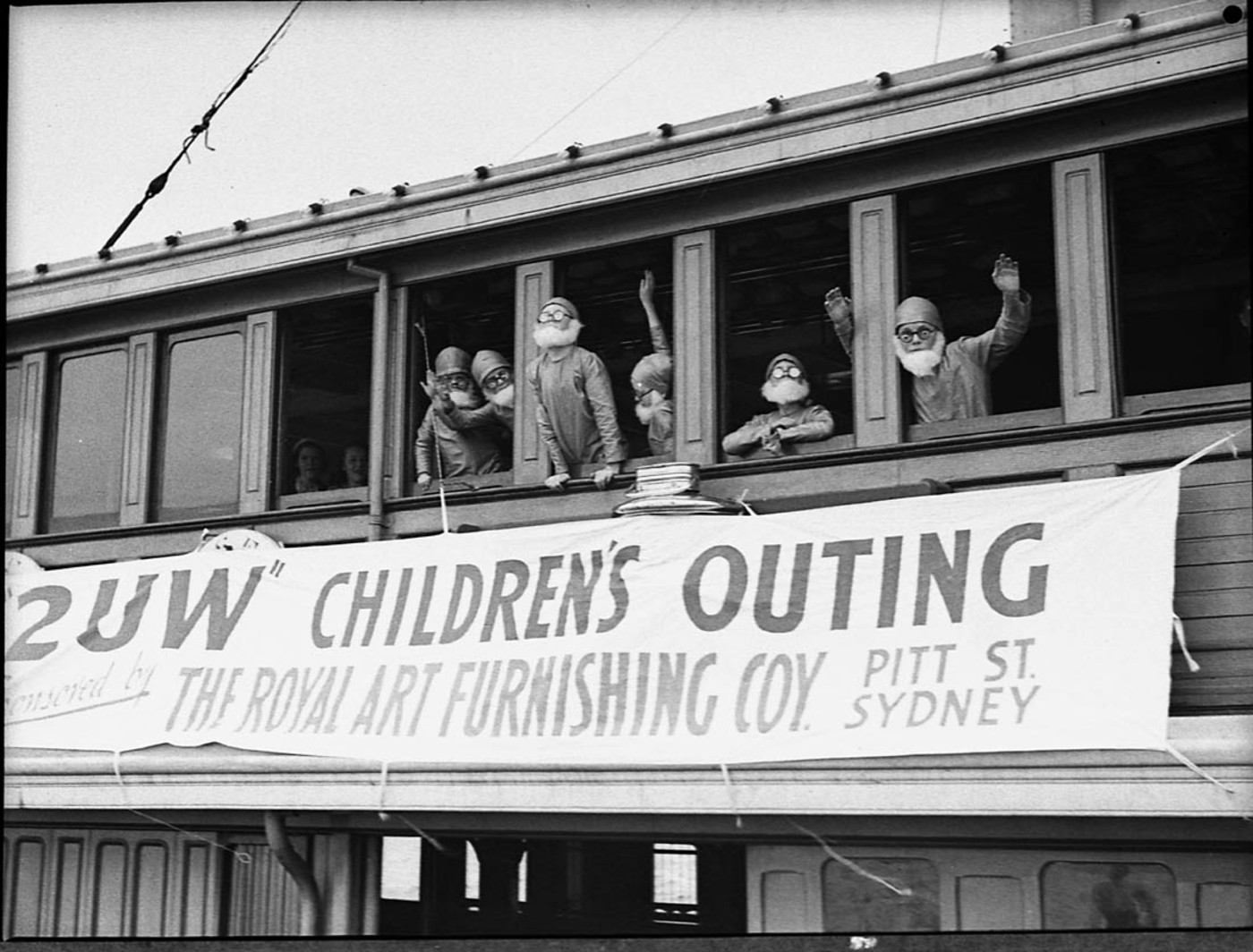
As an excursion boat in 1937 following her 1932 removal from regular ferry service

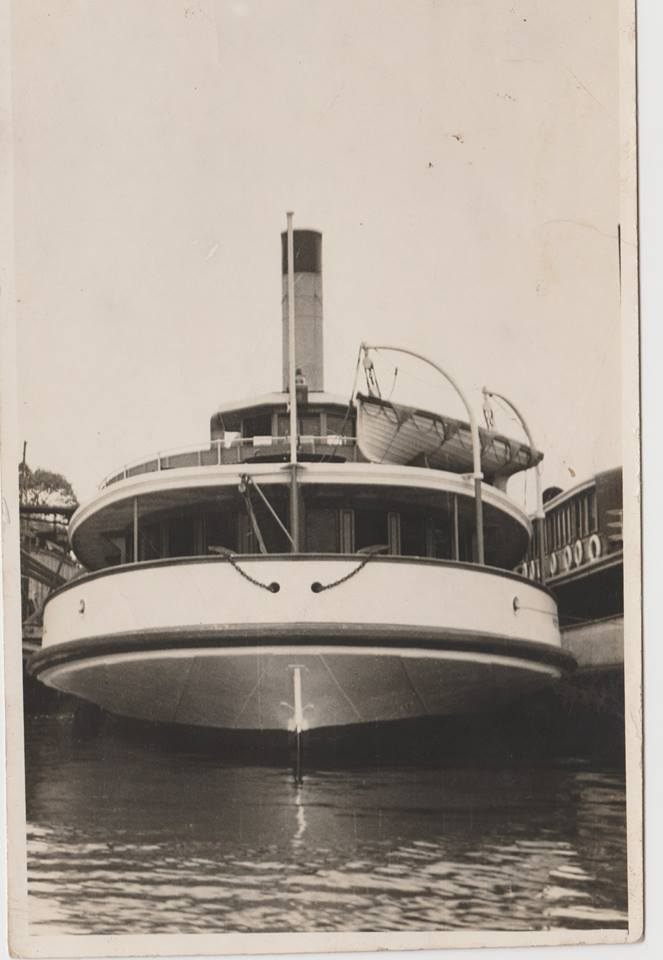
In her new post-Sydney Harbour Bridge colours, 1930s

== See also ==
- List of Sydney Harbour ferries
- Timeline of Sydney Harbour ferries
