= Walsh Island Dockyard & Engineering Works =

Australian dockyard

- Industry: Ship building
- Founded: 1913
- Founder: Government of New South Wales
- Defunct: 1933
- Fate: Closed
- Headquarters: Newcastle, New South Wales, Australia
- Owner: Government of New South Wales

The Walsh Island Dockyard & Engineering Works was a dockyard and engineering workshop established by the Government of New South Wales in 1913, at Walsh Island, Newcastle, Australia. The foundation stone was laid on 15 June 1913 by Arthur Griffith, the Minister for Works. The dockyard was constructed as a replacement for Sydney's Cockatoo Island Dockyard, that was taken over by the Federal Government in 1913.

Forty-seven vessels were constructed at the dockyard, including a 15,000-ton floating dock. The engineering works fabricated bolts, castings and steel fabrication work. It assembled electric carriages for the New South Wales Government Railways as well as trams. The dockyard was eventually abandoned in 1933 after the great depression and was dismantled and relocated to the new State Dockyard at Dyke End, Carrington.

== Ships built at Walsh Island Dockyard ==
- Mildred (1914)
- Delungra (1919)
- Enoggera (1920)
- Eurelia (1920)
- Eromanga (1921)
- Kooroongaba (1921)
- Kuttabul (1922)
- Koompartoo (1922)
- Sir Arthur Dorman (1925)
- Dorlonco (1925)
- Birubi (1927)
- hopper dredge Hermes (1930)
- 15,000 ton floating dock

== Products of engineering works ==
- 60 Tenders for 36 class locomotives
- NSW Department of Railways Rail Standard Type Rail Cars C3171-C3220 (1926-1927)
- NSW Department of Railways Rail Standard Type Rail Trailers T4301-T4548 (1926-1929)
- NSW Department of Railways Rail Standard Type Rail Cars C3251-C3300 (1928)
- NSW Department of Railways Rail Parcel Vans C3901-C3903 (1928)
- P-class Sydney tram
