= New South Wales American Suburban carriage stock =

American Suburban Carriage Stock
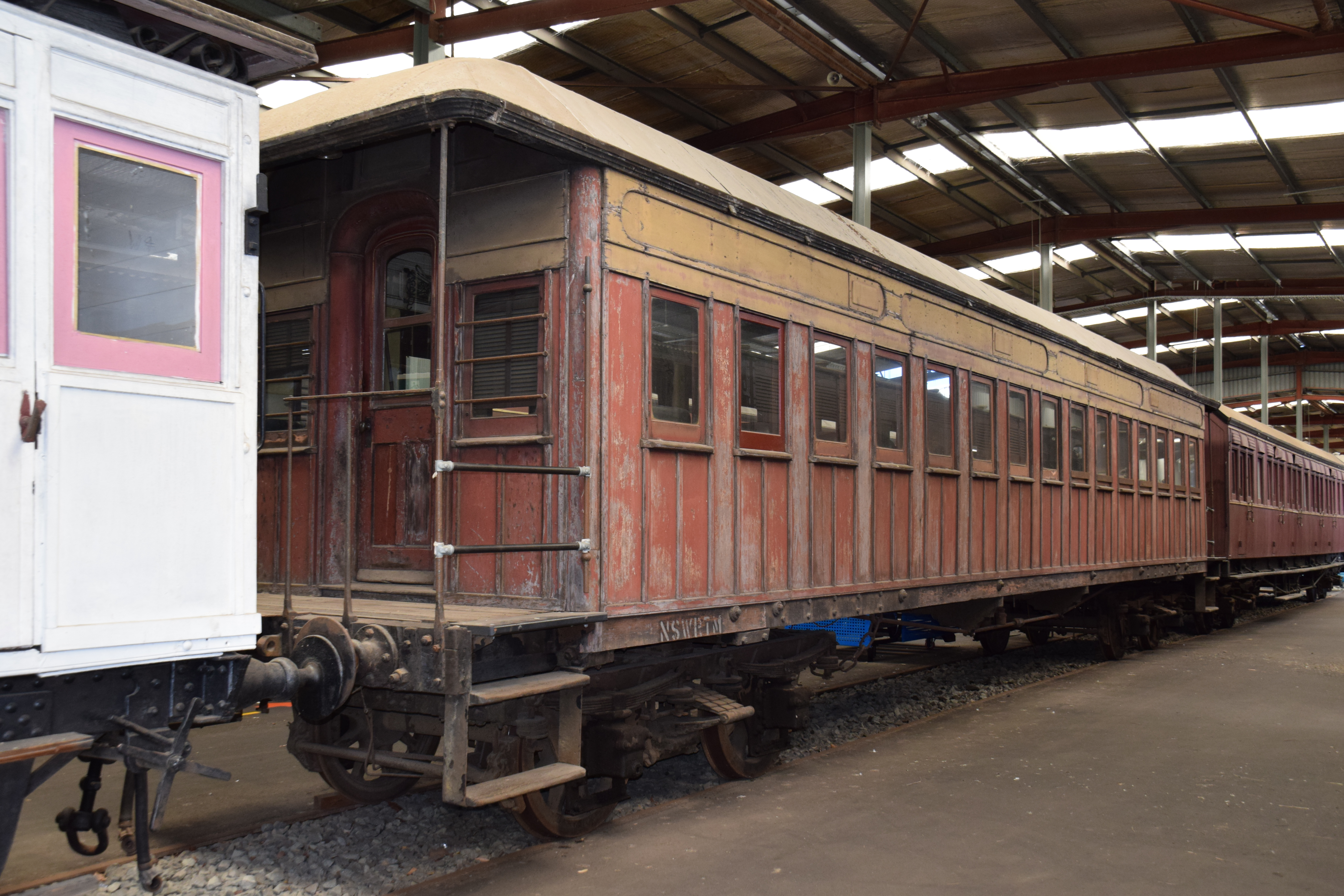
- LFA153 at Thirlmere

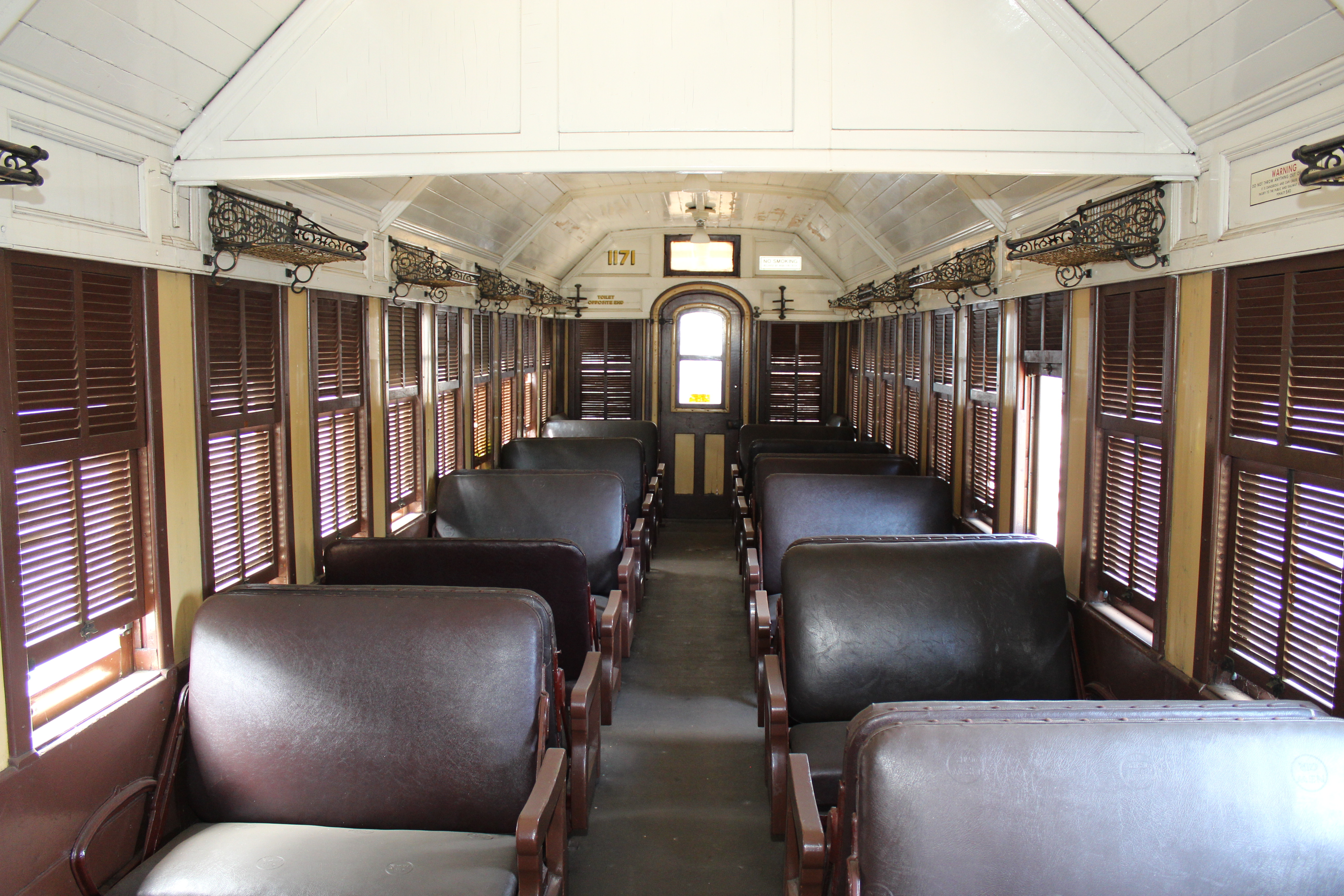
- Interior of HFA 1171 at Broadmeadow Loco Depot
- Manufacturers: Clyde Engineering (270); Ritchie Brothers (133); Hudson Brothers (141); C.G Hudson (18); John Morrison (68); Australasian Engineering & Rolling Stock Co. (20); Carriage and Wagon Works, Eveleigh (5); Jackson and Sharp (USA) (2); Gilbert, Bush and Co. (USA) (2)
- Constructed: 1877–1912
- Number built: 659
- Operator: New South Wales Government Railways Public Transport Commission

Specifications
- Car length: 49 ft 7 in (15.11 m)
- Width: 8 ft 10 in (2.69 m)
- Height: 12 ft 9 1/2 in (3.90 m)
- Weight: 17 to 22 tonnes (depending on type)
- Track gauge: 4 ft 8 1/2 in (1,435 mm) standard gauge

The American Suburban Carriages are a type of passenger carriage that were built for the New South Wales Government Railways.

== History ==
=== Locomotive hauled carriages ===
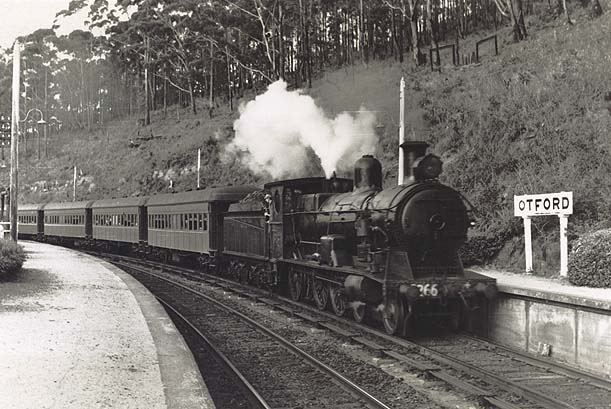
A train of carriages hauled by Class P6 Class locomotive C3266

The American Suburban Carriages were built between 1877 and 1912 by a number of manufacturers with timber frames and truss sided body work. Due to the truss bodywork, it was difficult to cut doors in the sides of the body so doors at either end of the cars were provided with covered platforms to allow access to the carriages.

They became the most numerous group of carriages built for any Australian railway system with a total of 659 carriages built. A further 196 carriages, known as Lucy Suburban Carriages were constructed between 1913 and 1916 but had steel under frames and separate bodywork.

While they retained the general layout and appearance of the American Suburban Carriage, they were generally not referred to as such. Most carriages were converted for use on longer distance services, whilst others were transferred to Newcastle and Wollongong for continued suburban service or to country branch lines. The American Suburban Carriages were built primarily as suburban passenger carriages for the Sydney network., The last examples were withdrawn in the mid-1970s.

=== Wooden electric carriages ===
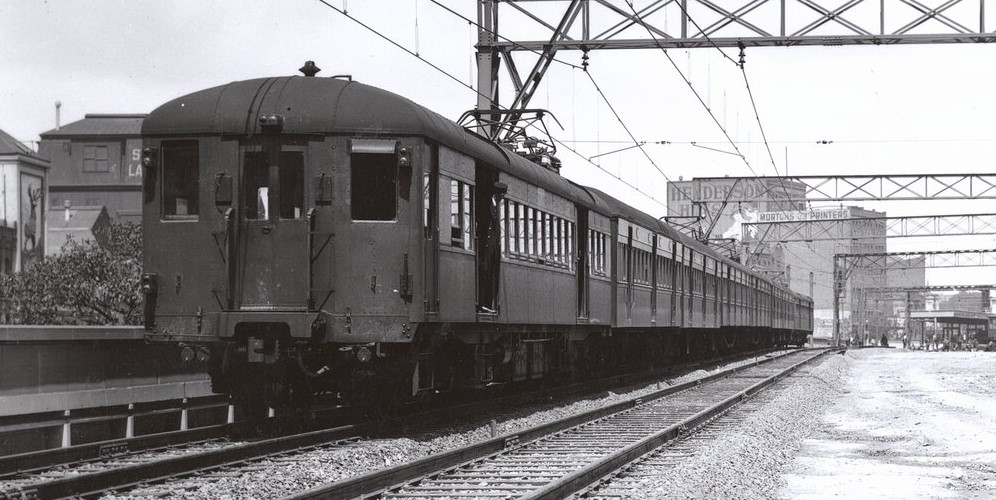
First electric train service to St James, 1926

Following the electrification of the Sydney network in the 1920s and 1930s, 193 were rebuilt as carriages for use in electric train stock, including the Wooden motor carriage and the Standard suburban carriage.

These carriages became (T4101–T4284), with nine more becoming driving trailers (D4001-D4009).

T4101-T4284 would become colloquially known as the "Wooden Trailers" to distinguish them from the wooden motor cars, nicknamed "Bradfield carriages" after John Bradfield.

They would also serve intermediately with the standard and Tulloch carriages. The conversions would involve closing the end platforms and the placement of passenger doors on the sides, along with replacement of the coupling receptacles. Some would be refurbished with Plywood to extend their service lives.

These carriage would be superseded by 120 new aluminium constructed double deck trailer carriages built by Tulloch Limited at Rhodes between 1964 and 1966 when they became uneconomical to repair because of their advanced age.

== Preservation ==
A number of these carriages have been preserved. Examples are held at the Canberra Railway Museum, Dorrigo Steam Railway and Museum, Lachlan Valley Railway, NSW Rail Museum and the Valley Heights Rail Museum.

Surviving examples include:

Number	Image	Location	Manufactuer	Owner	Status
CBI1073 (ex. BB 1073)		Valley Heights, NSW	Hudson Brothers	Valley Heights Rail Museum	Under restoration
BI1561		Broadmeadow, NSW	?	Broadmeadow Loco Depot	Static display
LFA153		Thirlmere, NSW	Morrison & Co	Transport Heritage NSW	Static display
LFA179		Valley Heights, NSW	Morrison & Co	Valley Heights Rail Museum	Operational
LFA1958		Broadmeadow, NSW	John Morrison	Broadmeadow Loco Depot	Static display
LFA942		Broadmeadow, NSW	Hudson Brothers	Broadmeadow Loco Depot	Static display
HFA1032		Broadmeadow, NSW	?	Broadmeadow Loco Depot	Static display
HFA1171		Broadmeadow, NSW	?	Broadmeadow Loco Depot	Static display
HFA1957		Broadmeadow, NSW	?	Broadmeadow Loco Depot	Static display
RBI1561		Broadmeadow, NSW	?	Broadmeadow Loco Depot	Static display

=== Surviving Wooden trailers ===
A few that were converted for use in with the early electric stock survive. Notably one carriage T4279 remains in the custody of Historic Electric Traction and under the ownership of Transport Heritage NSW. The Hunter Valley Rail Trust had three other converted carriages, Including D4004, the last surviving wooden driving trailer.

Number	Image	Location	Manufacturer	Owner	Status
D4004 (ex. BB1862)		Unknown	Ritchie Brothers	Hunter Valley Railway Trust (formerly)	Unknown
T4186 (ex. FA1997)		Unknown	?	Hunter Valley Railway Trust (formerly)	Unknown
T4224 (ex. FA1823)		Unknown	?	Hunter Valley Railway Trust (formerly)	Unknown
T4279 (ex. FA888)		Redfern, NSW	Ritchie Brothers	Transport Heritage NSW	Stored
