= Kooroongaba =

British ferry vessel

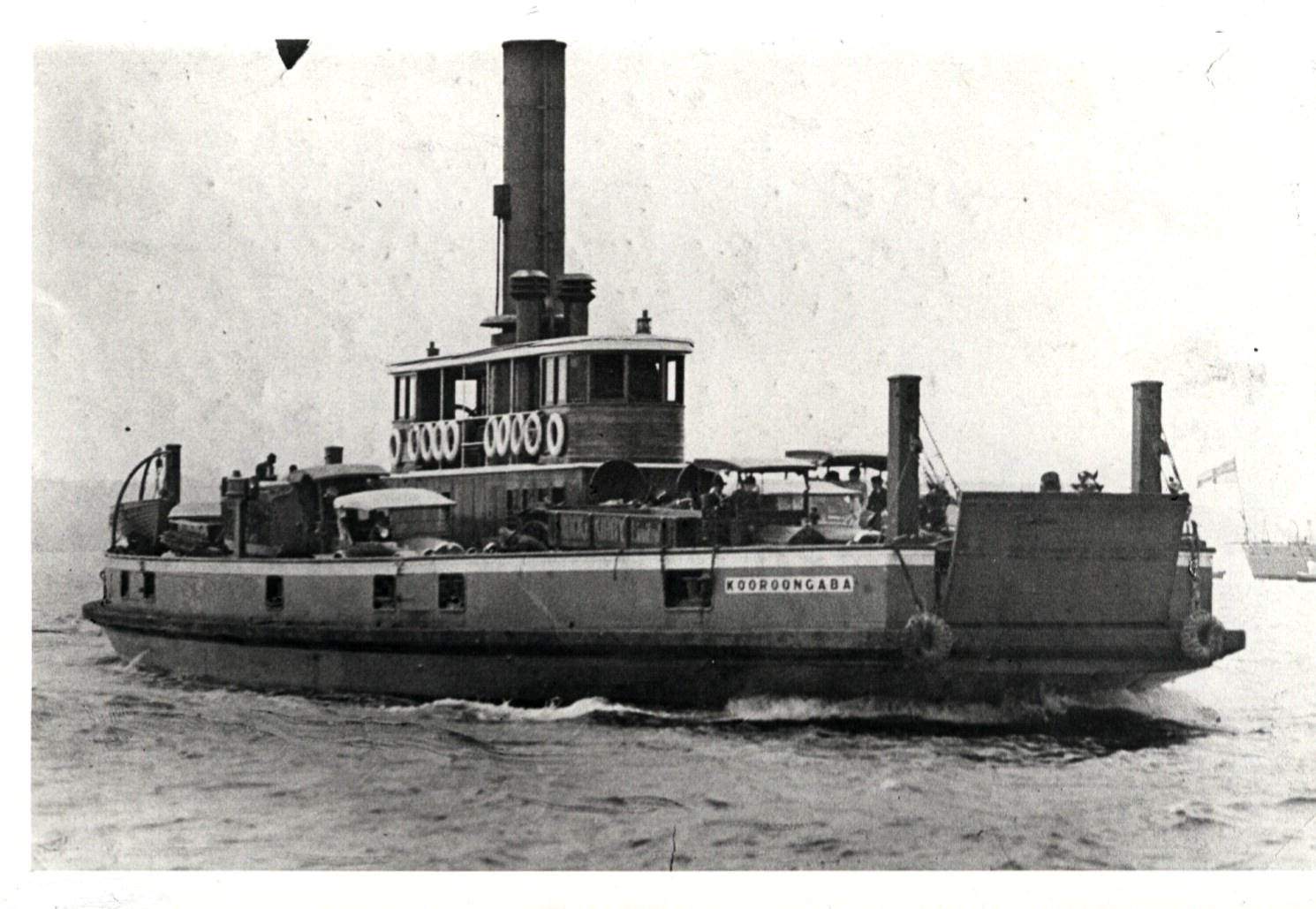
- Kooroongaba on Sydney Harbour, 1920s

History

Australia
- Name: Kooroongaba
- Owner: Sydney Ferries Limited, Department of Main Roads
- Port of registry: Sydney (1921-1932), Newcastle (1932-1971)
- Route: Circular Quay-Jeffrey Street Newcastle-Stockton
- Builder: Walsh Island Dockyard & Engineering Works, Newcastle
- Yard number: 55
- In service: 1921
- Out of service: 1971

General characteristics
- Type: Vehicle ferry
- Tonnage: 313 tons
- Length: 137 ft (42 m)
- Beam: 35.9 ft (10.9 m)

SS Kooroongaba was a vehicle ferry built for Sydney Ferries Limited. It later operated in Newcastle.

== History ==
Kooroongaba was built by the Walsh Island Dockyard & Engineering Works, Newcastle for Sydney Ferries Limited to operate vehicle ferry services from Circular Quay to Jeffrey Street. Made redundant by the opening of the Sydney Harbour Bridge in 1932, Kooroongabba was then used as a cargo carrier.

It was then sold to the Department of Main Roads and moved to Newcastle to operate as a vehicle ferry between Newcastle and Stockton. It remained in service until replaced by the Stockton Bridge in November 1971. It was sold in 1972 to the Philippines but sank off Crowdy Head while under tow.
