= Walsh Island, New South Wales =

Australian island

Coordinates: 32°54′14″S 151°46′32″E

Walsh Island was a small island at the junction of the north and south arms of the Hunter River of New South Wales, Australia. The island was manmade as part of a land reclamation project in the late 1800s. The land was unused, until 1912 when it was announced as a site for a new Government Dockyard. The Walsh Island Dockyard was a major employer for Newcastle throughout the 1920s. The island was reclaimed by dredging and is now the eastern end of Kooragang Island. The end of Kooragang Island, Walsh Point, is the only part left.
