= New South Wales Sputnik suburban carriage stock =

Retired class of electric multiple unit operated in New South Wales

Sputnik suburban carriage stock
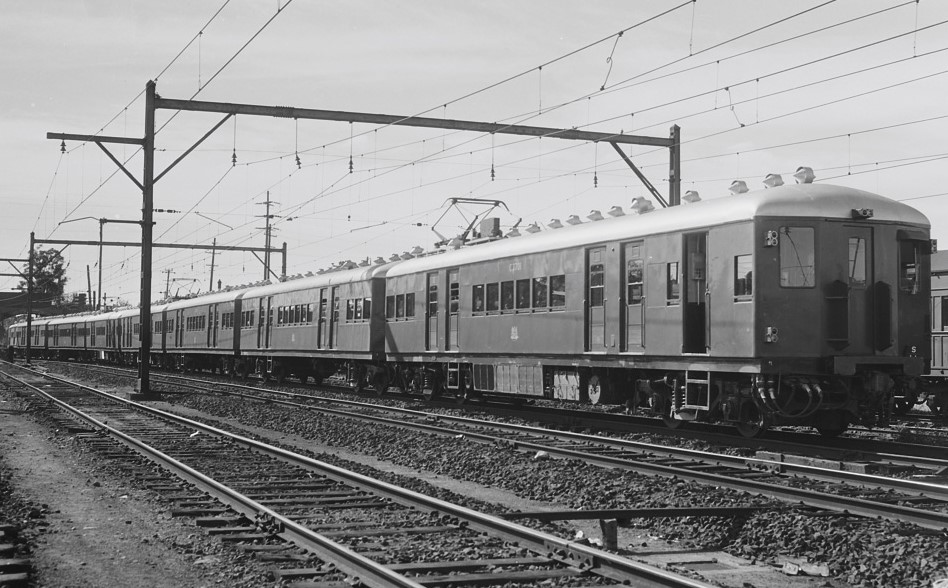
- An eight car 1955 type set at an unknown location in 1958
- Stock type: Electric multiple unit
- In service: 1957–1993
- Manufacturer: Commonwealth Engineering
- Built at: Granville
- Constructed: 1956–1960
- Number built: 40 motor cars; 40 trailer cars
- Number preserved: 68 carriages
- Number scrapped: 12 carriages
- Predecessor: Wooden trailer carriages
- Successor: K sets C sets T sets
- Formation: 8 carriages
- Fleet numbers: C3701–C3740; T4701–T4740, (Later T4751–T4790)
- Operators: New South Wales Government Railways; Public Transport Commission; State Rail Authority; CityRail
- Depots: Flemington; Hornsby; Mortdale; Punchbowl
- Line served: All Sydney suburban except Eastern Suburbs

Specifications
- Car length: 19.105 m (62 ft 8.2 in)
- Width: 3,142 mm (10 ft 3.7 in)
- Doors: 4 powered double sliding doors on each side
- Wheel diameter: 37 in (940 mm)
- Maximum speed: 70 mph (113 km/h)
- Traction system: 4 x Metropolitan-Vickers MV222 or 4 x AEI AEI149AZ series-wound DC traction motors per power car, each rated at 180 hp, semi automatic electro-pneumatic resistance control
- Transmission: 74:17 Gear ratio. Helical gears.
- Power supply: 120 V DC
- Electric system: 1,500 V DC catenary
- Current collection: Single-pan diamond pantograph
- Braking systems: Westinghouse, air
- Track gauge: 1,435 mm (4 ft 8 1/2 in) standard gauge

The Sputnik suburban carriage stock is a type of electric multiple unit that was operated by the New South Wales Government Railways and its successors between 1957 and 1993 and served on the Sydney suburban network.

Entering service in 1957, gaining the nickname "Sputniks" after the Russian satellite of the same name that the Soviet Union launched into space the same year.

In their later years, they, alongside the Standard and Tulloch stock, were nicknamed "Red Rattlers", the expression coming from Melbourne in reference to the wooden Tait trains. They were the last single deck carriages built for Sydney's Suburban network. They were also known as 1955 type carriages.

== History ==
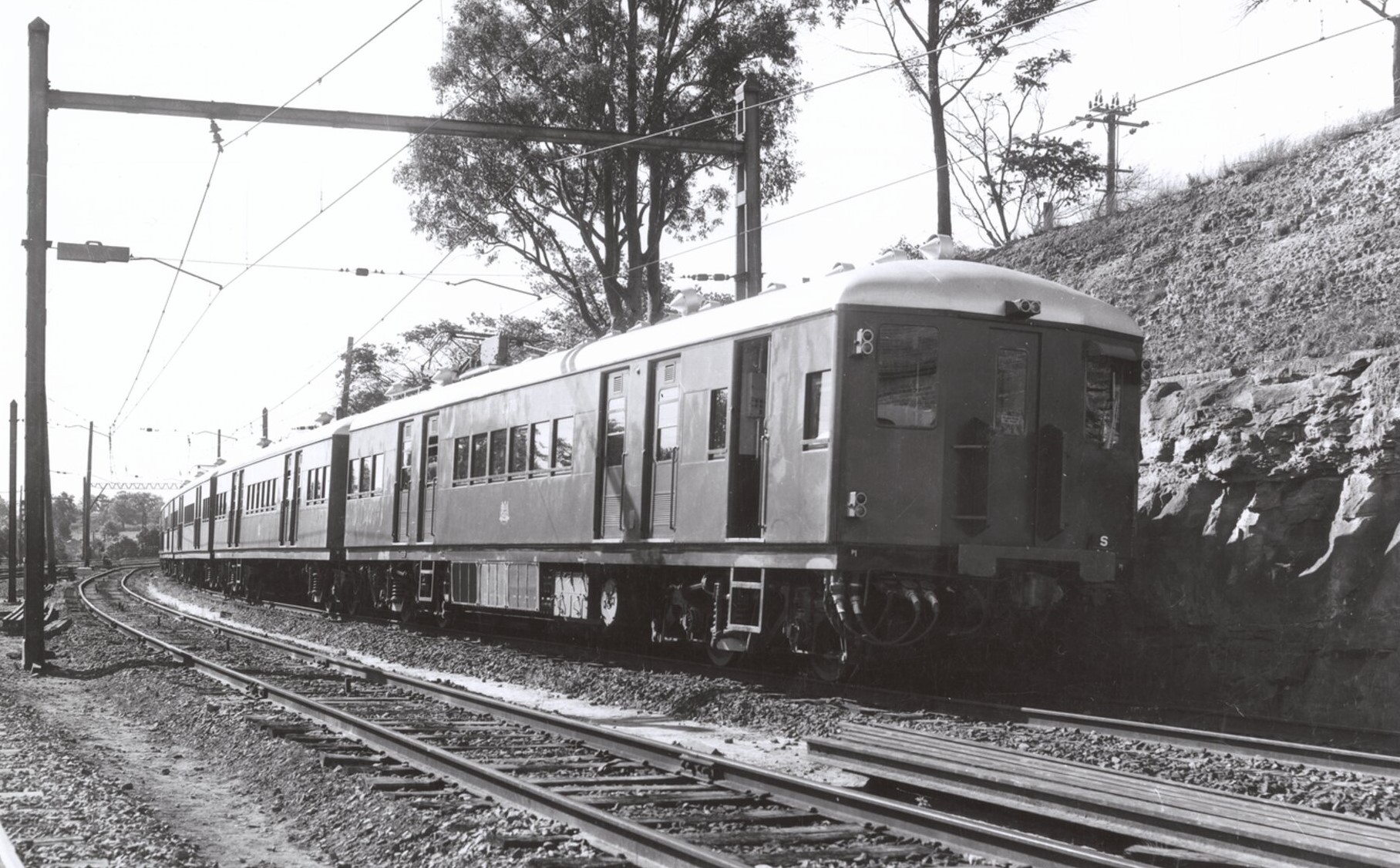
An eight car set in 1958

Between 1956 and 1960, 40 power cars and 40 trailer cars were built by Commonwealth Engineering for the New South Wales Government Railways.

They were ostensibly built to provide rolling stock for the newly electrified Parramatta to Penrith section of the Main Western line, and they operated across the Sydney suburban network. 80 carriages were built by 1960.

They operated as eight car sets, being targeted as S sets and were the first trains to have their target plates distinguish the type, in contrast to the previously built sets, of which the target plates correspond to the depot they were located to. The S stood for "Safety Doors".

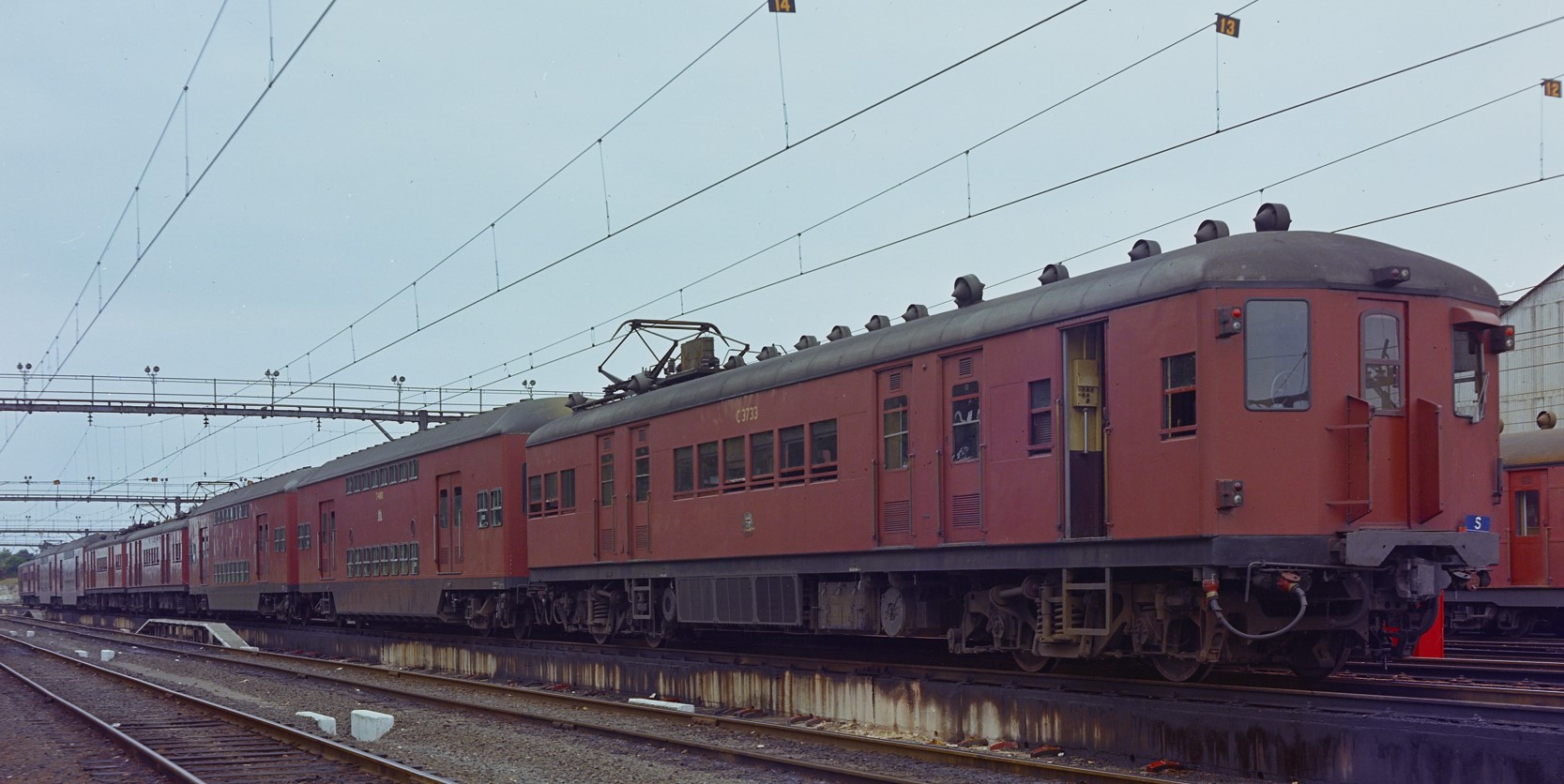
An eight car set with four double deck cars at Flemington, 1968

Following the delivery of the Tulloch double deck trailers from 1964, these replaced the original trailers in the powered door sets. Originally, only cars such as these power cars were allowed to haul two double deck carriages per four car set due to them having four traction motors per car and resulting in more tractive power, as opposed to two, but the older two motored cars proved to also be capable.

The displaced trailer carriages had their power door equipment disconnected at Elcar workshops, where they were fitted with manually operated door equipment and pooled with the Standard and Tulloch stock. These were renumbered upwards by 50, e.g. T4701 became T4751.

After having originally being targeted S1-S9, They were retargeted as W1-W9 when the double deck suburban cars that fell under the former designation were introduced in 1972.

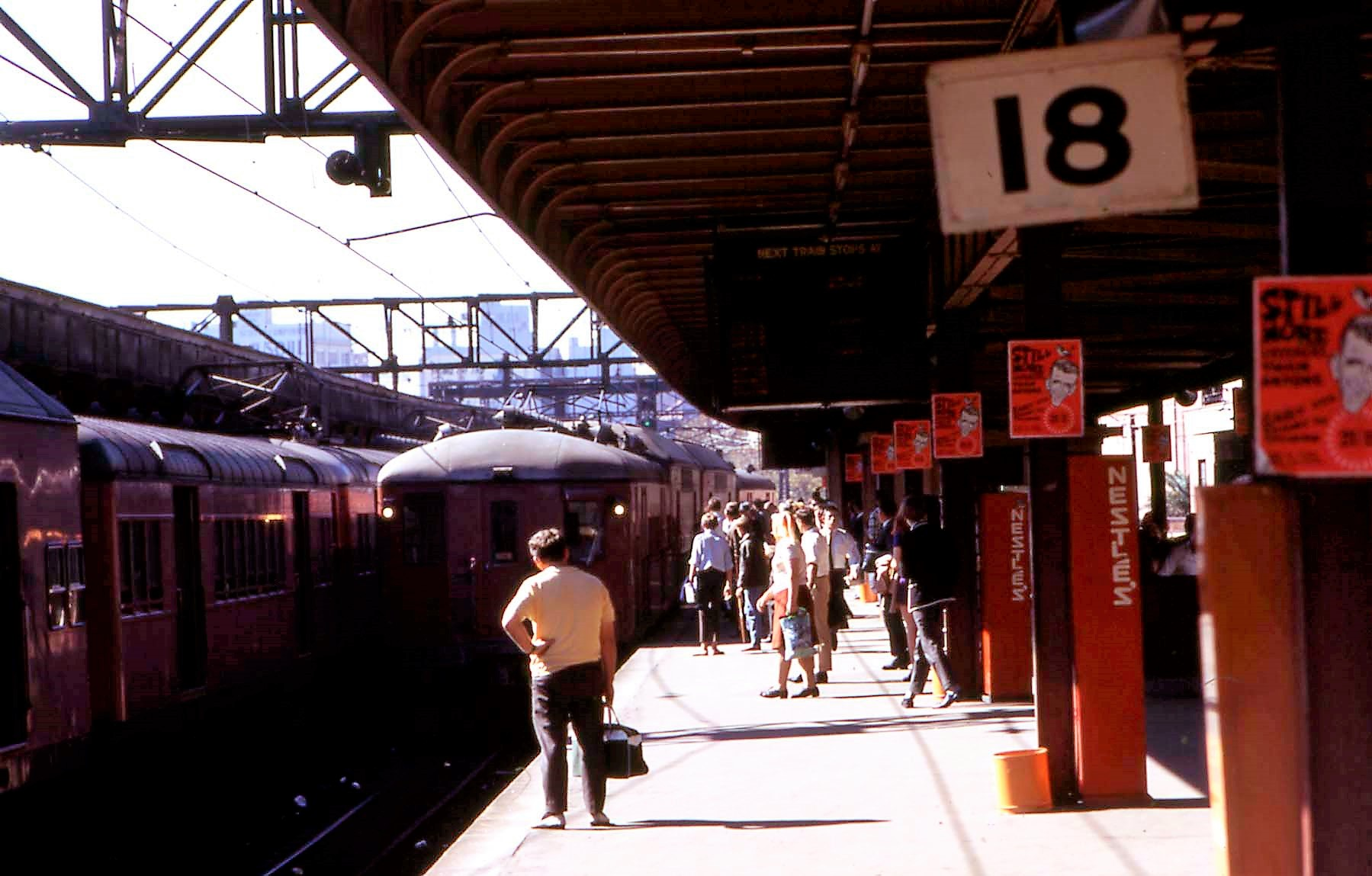
A W set (then S set) at Central railway station on Platform 18 in 1970

Originally painted Tuscan red, from 1973 they were repainted in the Public Transport Commission blue and white livery before the livery was replaced with Indian red in 1976. The interiors were originally painted brown and cream with the later repaints being in two-tone green, but not all cars were repainted.

Due to the scarcity of parts for both the Sputnik and U set motor cars, in 1979, motor cars C3737-C3739 were converted into non-control motor cars numbered N4679-N4681 with their traction motors removed and being converted from power operated doors to manual doors before being converted into trailer carriages in November 1985 retaining the aforementioned numbers but using the "T" classification.

While they were targeted differently, they were still kept at the same four depots as the other single deck suburban carriages until 1983, when the entire fleet was allocated to Punchbowl.

In the early 1990s, two sets were repainted in special liveries. These were W1 (C3705, C3740, C3707, and C3710) in a "Sesqui Train" livery in celebration of 150 years of the city of Sydney, and W2 (C3701, C3719, C3725 and C3714) in a livery dubbed the "New South Wales Zoo Train MK2" as a promotion of Taronga Zoo. Also repainted was trailer T4785 on set "H22" which was repainted as "The Tiger" in March 1991.

Overhauls of the stock continued up until 1988, with some receiving sliding aluminium Beclawat windows to alleviate rust problems. Most of the trailer cars remained in service until the end of single deck operation in January 1992. The remaining motor cars remained in service for a slightly longer period because of their powered doors, but they were eventually succeeded by the new "Tangara" T sets built by A Goninan and co.

The last power cars were withdrawn in November 1993 with a few carriages scrapped across the network alongside the Standard and Tulloch cars that had been retired the same and the year before. The last train to be withdrawn was set W2.

== Construction and distinguishing features ==
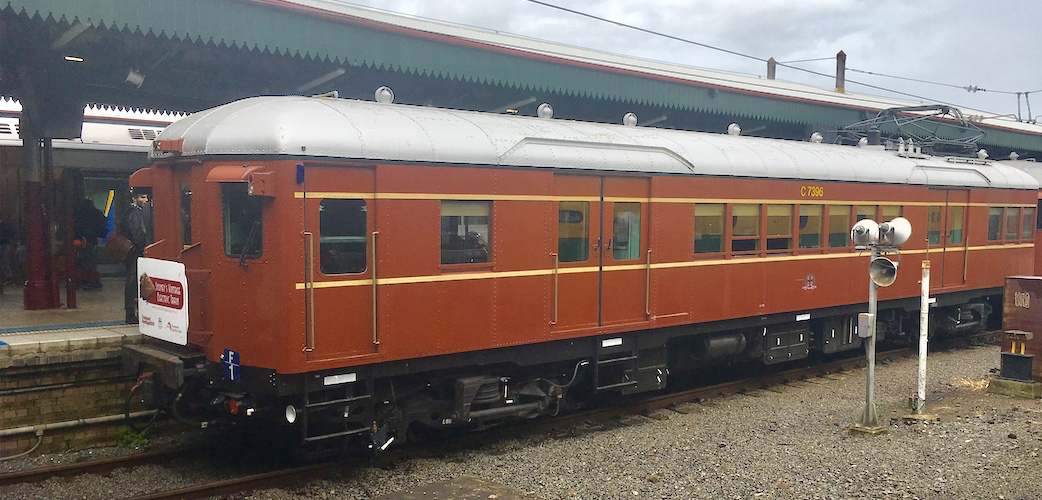
C7396 (ex. C3396), Clyde motor car

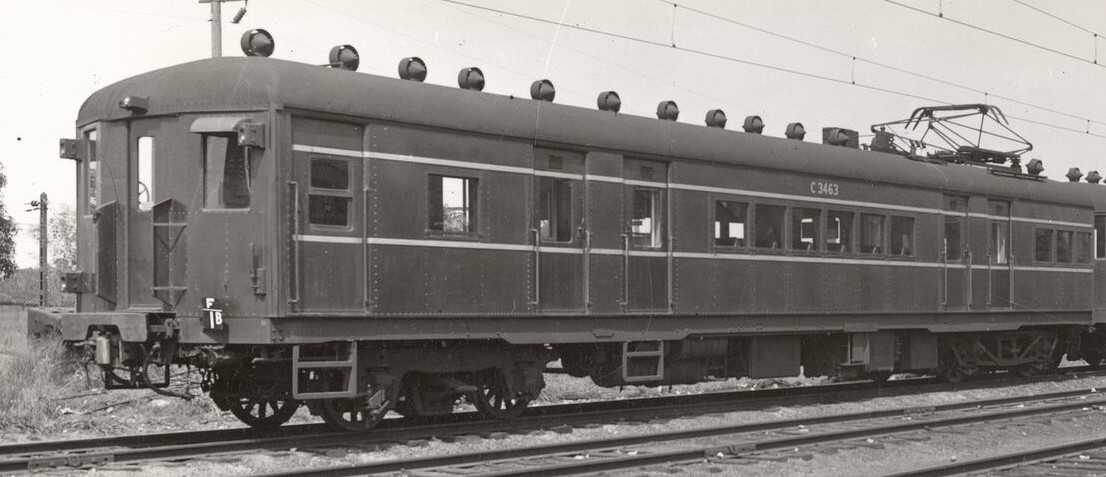
C3463, Tulloch Limited motor car

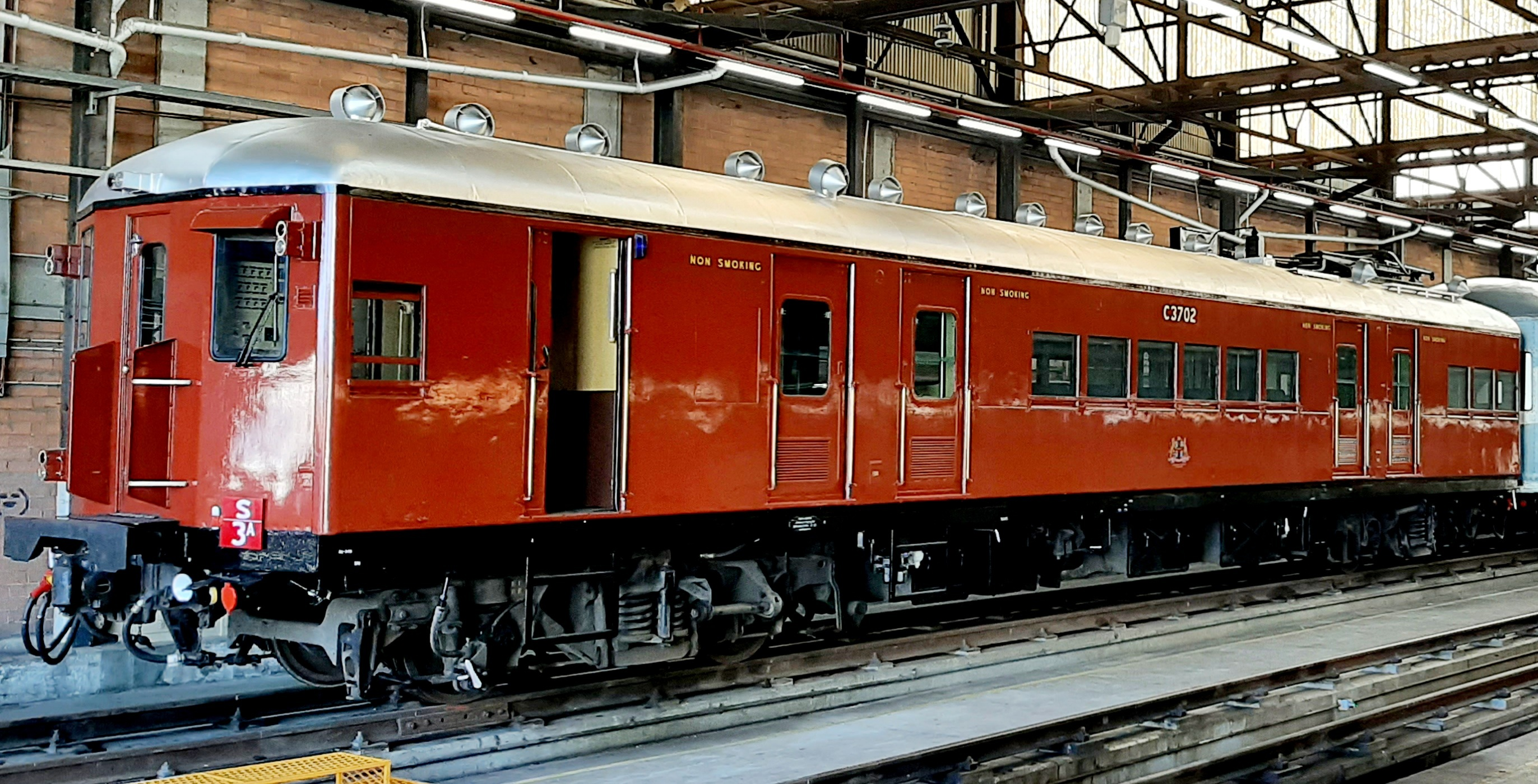
C3702, Comeng motor car

The carriages were broadly similar to the Tulloch built carriages, built earlier in the 1950s, they differed in having twin motors on both bogies, as opposed to two on the bogie below the pantograph like older power carriages.

This meant they were electrically incompatible with the previously built suburban cars, but were compatible with the interurban cars also built by Comeng around the same period. Like previous built stock, their tractive equipment was provided by Metropolitan-Vickers.

These cars were additionally fitted with power operated doors, as well as being of spot welded construction rather than riveted like previously built suburban carriages, and the crew compartment door set further back with a larger cab in the power cars. They only received a sun shade over the driver's window.

| Total | Type | Numbers |
|---|---|---|
| 40 | Motor cars | C3701–C3740 |
| 40 | Trailer cars | T4701–T4740 |

To make up for the archaic technology of air-conditioning at the time, a row of ventilators were placed on the roof. As the carriages had powered doors, vent slits were put into the doors to make up for the inability to be opened manually, as well as extra ventilators on the roof next to the doors. The power-operated doors meant that the carriages were not compatible electrically with the older carriages.

== Preservation ==
Heritage set W3 in 2001 taking a rail tour for 75 years of electric trains in New South Wales

A four car set was formed for heritage runs to go into the care of the Sydney Electric Train Society (SETS) on behalf of the State Rail Authority. The set became known as "W3" and was formed of motor cars C3702 and C3708 with Tulloch double deck trailer carriages T4801 and T4814. Motor car C3702 led the official train to open the newly electrified Campbelltown line on 4 May 1968. All four were taken from set W5 which had been withdrawn at Punchbowl car sheds.

The set was removed from Punchbowl and transferred to Redfern where it was taken by SETS in November 1994. Also part of the fleet of manual door cars is trailer T4790, the last single deck suburban carriage built by Commonwealth Engineering in New South Wales. It along with standard cars C3237 and C3444 were all planned to return to traffic in heritage service by late 1995, but this did not happen.

In 1997, several SETS members left over differences in how carriage ownership should be tackled, and formed Historic Electric Traction. W3 would go into their custody along with mixed single deck set F1 with the intent of taking care of them for the SRA.

W3 would be restored to convince the SRA to let heritage electric trains run on the mainline. The train's first mainline run was cut short after a motor failure on the Cronulla line. This was attributed to a Coca-Cola can found in a motor brush housing, the result of a missing cover. W3 was later given a complete motor change. Despite this incident, W3 would run tours following its certification.

W3 would run on 3 March 2001 to celebrate 75 years of electric rolling stock in New South Wales. Later on 27 October 2001, SETS would hire W3 for their Sputnik suburban tour during which the motor cars wore "S7" target plates.

In 2005, W3 was prohibited from running due to the introduction of new technology to meet stricter certification requirements following the 2003 Waterfall Accident. W3 last carried passengers on 25 September 2005 for the sesquicentenary of the New South Wales railways where it took passengers through Olympic park. W3 would be stored following the end of this event. Prior to dormancy, W3 was also used to substitute for an M set.

15 years later, following the formation of Transport Heritage NSW and Sydney Trains, efforts were made to bring W3 back to the mainline for charter services starting in 2016 following the certification of set F1. Unlike F1, W3's condition meant it would take five years to get the train ready for mainline use. Also, unlike F1, it was decided that this time, each carriage would be repainted in different liveries to showcase suburban transportation over the course of 36 years of their service lives.

The motor cars were painted in different shades of red, with C3702 in Department of Railways Tuscan red and C3708 in State Rail Authority Indian red. The trailers were also painted differently from each other, with T4801 sharing the Tuscan red livery of C3702 and T4814 being repainted in the Public Transport Commission colours, with the mandarin blue being donated to HET via the Sydney Bus Museum.

Aside from C3702, all cars would have their interior painted in two-tone green, while the former was given a brown and cream interior. On March 28, 2021, W3 was removed from Redfern and transferred to Flemington by 47 class locomotive 4708. The motor cars were fitted with a train data logging system and speedometers salvaged from scrapped S sets.

W3 would eventually make an appearance as a display at the 2022 and 2024 transport heritage expos. In the case of the former, car C3708 had a flat wheel and could not run under its own power, and so it was transferred back to Flemington with the help of set K76 upon the end of the expo. W3 would take its first test run on 25 September 2024, and its second on 1 October the same year.As of 2025, W3 has yet to perform in charter service since its 2020s' restoration. Also in Historic Electric Traction's custody is T4790.

SETS also has four carriages that were purchased on 24 November 1998 from a Cataract Scout Park public auction. These were trailers T4769 and T4771 and motor cars C3714 and C3725 which came from the Zoo train. The latter two cars were stored at Meeks Road with plans to be restored to operable status however, long term exposure to the elements and vandalism damage quickly led the ceasing of the work. They were later transferred to a siding in Chullora. While these cars are all preserved by SETS, they are not part of the official collection.

The following carriages have been retained for heritage reasons:
| Number | Image | Location | Owner | Status | Notes |
|---|---|---|---|---|---|
| C3702 | | Flemington, NSW | Transport Heritage NSW / Sydney Trains | Operational | Wears "S3A" target plate |
| C3708 | | Flemington, NSW | Transport Heritage NSW / Sydney Trains | Operational | |
| C3714 | | Chullora, NSW | SETS (Unofficial) | Stored | |
| C3717 | | Unknown | Unknown | Unknown | Kept as a spare |
| C3725 | | Chullora, NSW | SETS (Unofficial) | Stored | |
| T4768 (ex. T4718) | | Molong, NSW | SETS (Unofficial) | Stored | |
| T4771 (ex. T4721) | | Molong, NSW | SETS (Unofficial) | Stored | |
| T4790 (ex. T4740) | | Redfern, NSW | Transport Heritage NSW / Sydney Trains | Stored | |

=== Privately owned cars ===
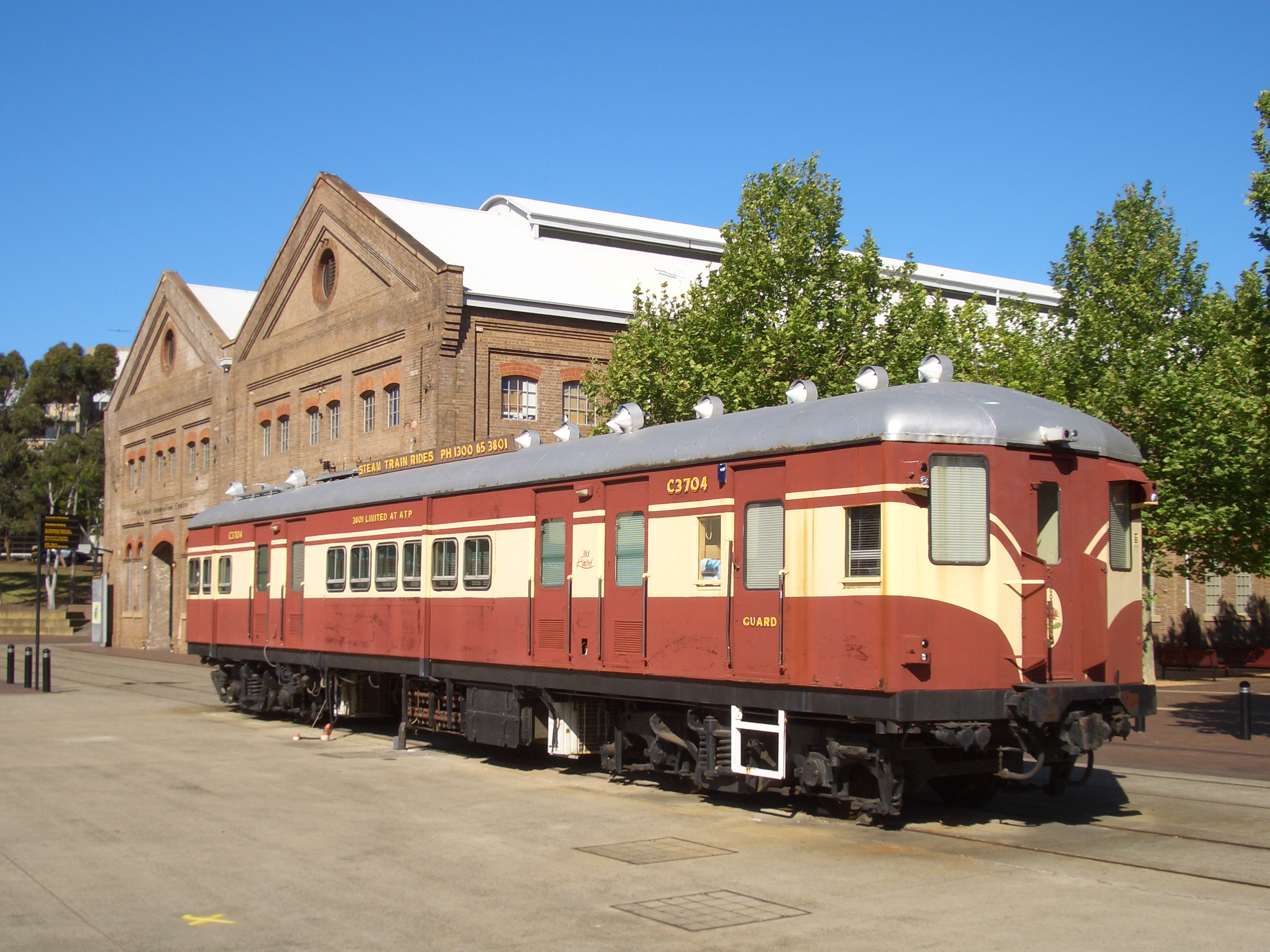
C3704 at Redfern in 2006

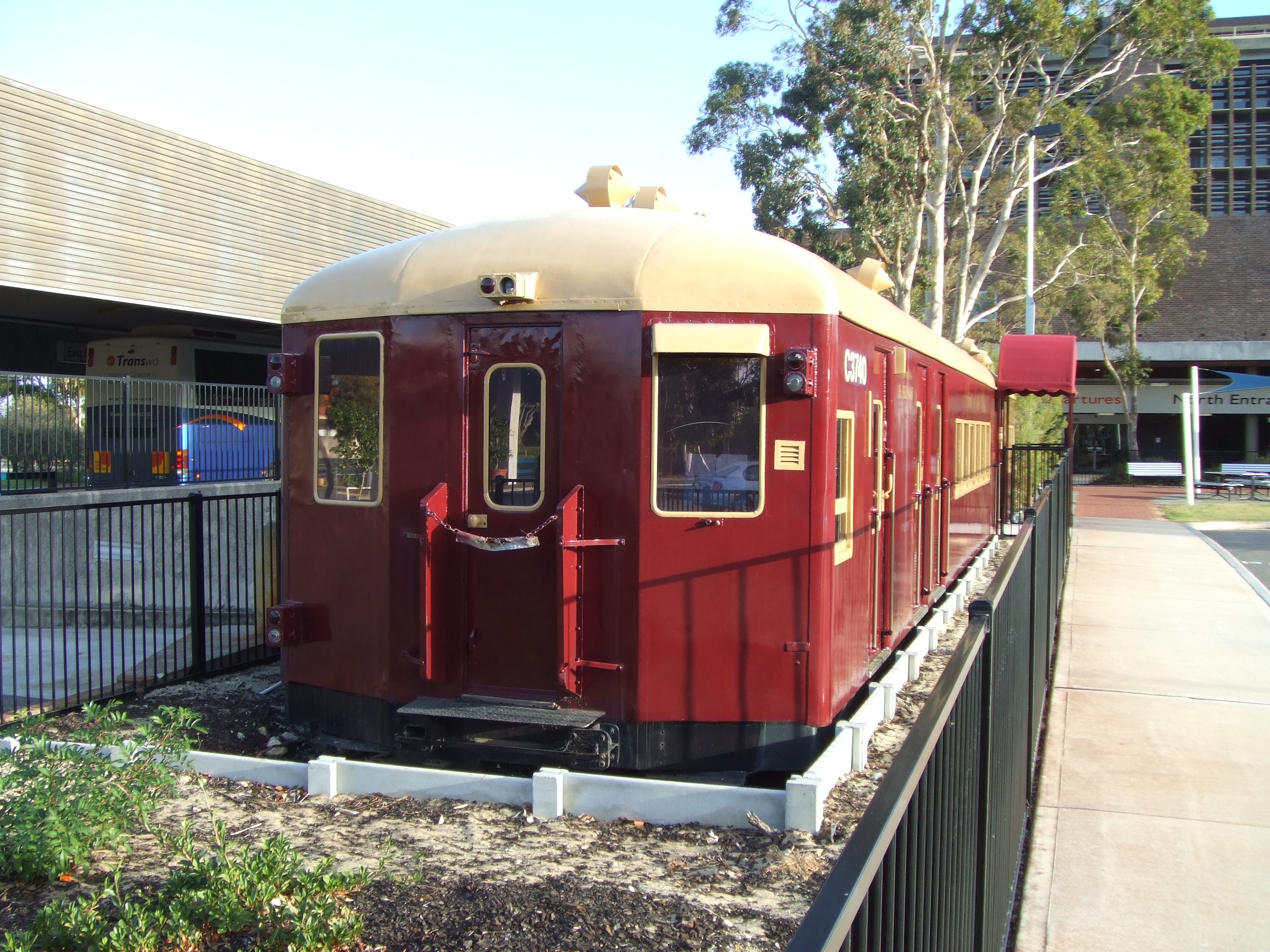
C3740 outside Perth Railway station

60 cars were sold via contract to Milfren Pty Ltd from 1992 to 1994 to private buyers. Usually this would only include the body of the carriage, lacking pantographs and bogies, however there are some exceptions to these.

The power cars would be sold alongside some of the Tulloch double deck trailers they worked with, although there plans for conversion of the double deck trailers to work with S sets, this would ultimately never materialize.

The trailers were sold amongst the other manual door carriages that were being withdrawn at the time.

| Car Number | Date Sold | Original Location | Current Location | Owner | Notes |
|---|---|---|---|---|---|
| C3701 | ? | Dubbo, NSW | Unknown | Unknown | |
| C3703 | ? | Braidwood, NSW | Unknown | Unknown | |
| C3704 | 08/05/2019 | Redfern, NSW | Taree, NSW | Geoff Willis | Removed from the Australian Technology Park and relocated after previously being owned by 3801 Limited (now East Coast Heritage Rail) who used it as a site office. |
| C3705 | 02/03/1994 | Dungog, NSW | Dungog, NSW | Carriageway | |
| C3706 | 02/02/1994 | Murwillumbah, NSW | Unknown | Unknown | |
| C3707 | 22/02/1994 | Lithgow, NSW | Unknown | Unknown | |
| C3709 | 07/06/1993 | Orange, NSW | Unknown | Unknown | |
| C3710 | 25/02/1994 | Orange, NSW | Unknown | Unknown | |
| C3711 | 27/09/1993 | Dungog, NSW | Dungog, NSW | Carriageway | |
| C3712 | 16/06/1993 | Candelo, NSW | Unknown | Unknown | |
| C3713 | 03/06/1993 | Lightning Ridge, NSW | Lightning Ridge, NSW | Graeme Anderson | |
| C3716 | 22/021993 | Lightning Ridge, NSW | Lightning Ridge, NSW | Graeme Anderson | |
| C3718 | 13/11/1993 | Murwillumbah, NSW | Unknown | Unknown | |
| C3719 | ? | Dubbo, NSW | Unknown | Unknown | |
| C3721 | 09/12/1993 | Grafton, NSW | Unknown | Unknown | |
| C3722 | 09/06/1993 | Coomba Park, NSW | Unknown | Unknown | |
| C3723 | 01/10/1993 | Carcoar, NSW | Unknown | Unknown | |
| C3726 | 03/03/1994 | Liverpool, NSW | Polkobin, NSW | Krinklewood Cootage and Carriages | |
| C3727 | 01/07/1993 | Quandilla, NSW | Unknown | Unknown | |
| C3728 | 06/07/1993 | Knorrit Flat, NSW | Unknown | Unknown | |
| C3730 | 07/07/1993 | South Grafton, NSW | Ariah Park, NSW | Country Carriage Bead and Breakfast | |
| C3731 | 29/03/1994 | Tenterfield, NSW | Unknown | Unknown | |
| C3733 | 18/12/1993 | Mudgee, NSW | Mudgee, NSW | formerly Mudgee | |
| C3734 | 10/03/1994 | Winmalee, NSW | Winmalee,NSW | Unknown | |
| C3735 | 11/02/1994 | Dungog, NSw | Dungog, NSW | Carriageway | |
| T4679 (ex. C3737) | ? | Unknown | Near Couridjah, NSW | Tharawal aboriginal mission (formerly) | |
| T4680 (ex. C3738) | ? | Unknown | Near Couridjah, NSW | Tharawal aboriginal mission (formerly) | |
| T4681 (ex. C3739) | ? | Unknown | Near Couridjah, NSW | Tharawal aboriginal mission (formerly) | |
| C3740 | 23/02/1994 | North Strathfield, NSW | Helena Valley, WA | Unknown | |
| T4751 (ex. T4701) | 26/03/1992 | Crowther, NSW | Unknown | Unknown | |
| T4753 (ex. T4703) | 25/09/1992 | Lightning Ridge, NSW | Unknown | Unknown | |
| T4754 (ex. T4704) | 14/09/1992 | Croppa Creek, NSW | Unknown | Unknown | |
| T4756 (ex. T4706) | 30/03/1992 | Lightning Ridge, NSW | Unknown | Unknown | |
| T4757 (ex. T4707) | 03/11/1992 | Lightning Ridge, NSW | Lightning Ridge, NSW | Unknown | |
| T4758 (ex. T4708) | 09/02/1992 | Dubbo, NSW | Unknown | Unknown | |
| T4759 (ex. T4709) | 20/07/1992 | Singleton, NSW | Unknown | Unknown | |
| T4760 (ex. T4710) | 17/09/1992 | Wee Waa, NSW | Unknown | Unknown | |
| T4761 (ex. T4711) | 04/05/1992 | Ourimbah, NSW | Unknown | Unknown | |
| T4764 (ex. T4714) | 13/07/1992 | Rouse, NSW | Unknown | Unknown | |
| T4765 (ex. T4715) | 12/02/1992 | Bingara, NSW | Unknown | Unknown | |
| T4766 (ex. T4716) | 15/05/1992 | West Wylong, NSW | Unknown | Unknown | |
| T4767 (ex. T4717) | 01/09/1992 | Hartley, NSW | Unknown | Unknown | |
| T4769 (ex. T4719) | 26/02/1992 | Peats Ridge, NSW | Peats Ridge, NSW | Unknown | |
| T4772 (ex. T4722) | 07/03/1992 | Mudgee, NSW | Unknown | Unknown | |
| T4773 (ex. T4723) | 21/05/1992 | Bellingen, NSW | Unknown | Unknown | |
| T4776 (ex. T4726) | 20/03/1992 | Portland, NSW | Unknown | Unknown | |
| T4779 (ex. T4729) | 22/07/1992 | Gundagai, NSW | Unknown | Unknown | |
| T4780 (ex. T4730) | 13/04/1992 | Narromine, NSW | Unknown | Unknown | |
| T4781 (ex. T4731) | 28/02/1992 | Windsor, NSW | Taree, NSW | Geoff Willis | |
| T4782 (ex. T4732) | 12/03/1992 | North Dubbo, NSW | Unknown | Unknown | |
| T4783 (ex. T4733) | 29/07/1992 | Gilgandra, NSW | Unknown | Unknown | |
| T4785 (ex. T4735) | 01/10/1992 | Dubbo, NSW | Unknown | Unknown | |
| T4786 (ex. T4736) | 18/02/1992 | Queanbeyan, NSW | Wallaroo, NSW | The Last Stop Ambledown Brook | |
| T4787 (ex. T4737) | 06/03/1992 | North Ryde, NSW | Trangie, NSW | Tandarra Caravan Park | |
