= Punchbowl Maintenance Depot =

Train storage depot in Sydney, Australia

Coordinates: 33.9205°S 151.0479°E

- Interactive map of Punchbowl Maintenance Depot

Location
- Location: Punchbowl

Characteristics
- Owner: RailCorp
- Operator: CityRail

History
- Opened: 1923
- Closed: 1995

The Punchbowl Maintenance Depot was a train storage and maintenance depot in the south-western Sydney suburb of Punchbowl.

The depot opened in 1923 and was one of four electric train depots built under the Bradfield electrification plan, the other depots being at Mortdale, Flemington and Hornsby. Punchbowl was the first electric train depot to have a carriage washing plant installed, in 1959. A newer enclosed washing plant replaced the original one in 1986 and similar plants were also installed at the other three depots. The depot formerly stabled and maintained trains used on the Bankstown and East Hills lines.

By the early 1990s Punchbowl was considered "in the middle of nowhere" due to the expansion of Sydney's population to the west and south-west and Punchbowl was no longer near the terminus of the lines it served, adding to operational difficulties and inconvenience. Punchbowl Maintenance Centre closed in February 1995 after the last single-deck carriages were withdrawn in November 1993. Responsibility for its Tangaras was transferred to Mortdale, and responsibility for other double-deck cars was transferred to Flemington. The site lay closed and derelict for several years, before being demolished. The former area is now known as The Waterford Estate while a park called Sidings Park has been established in the middle of the estate as an interpretation of the site's previous use.
