= 4D (train) =

Melbourne prototype double deck electric multiple unit

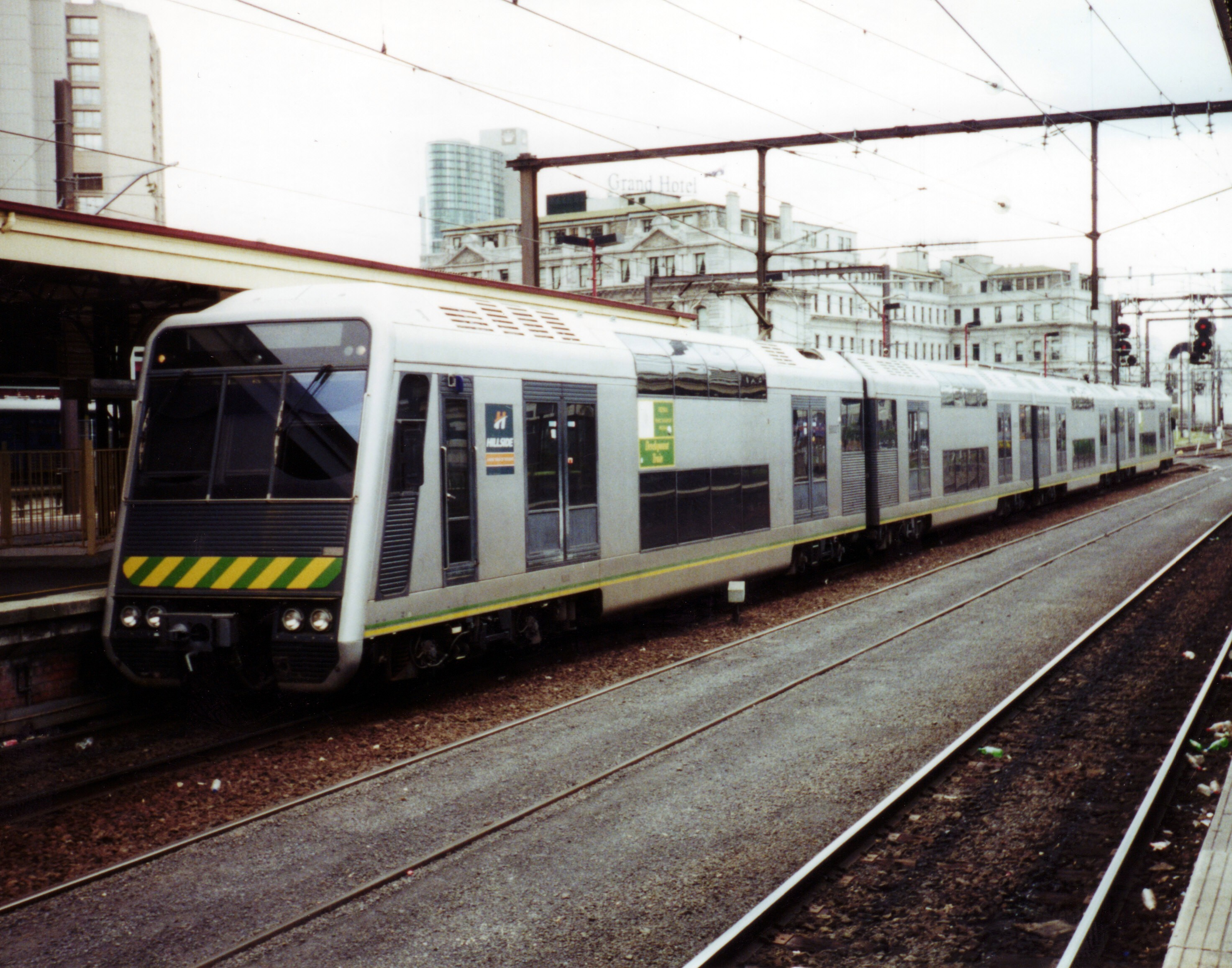
- 4D train at Spencer Street, 2000

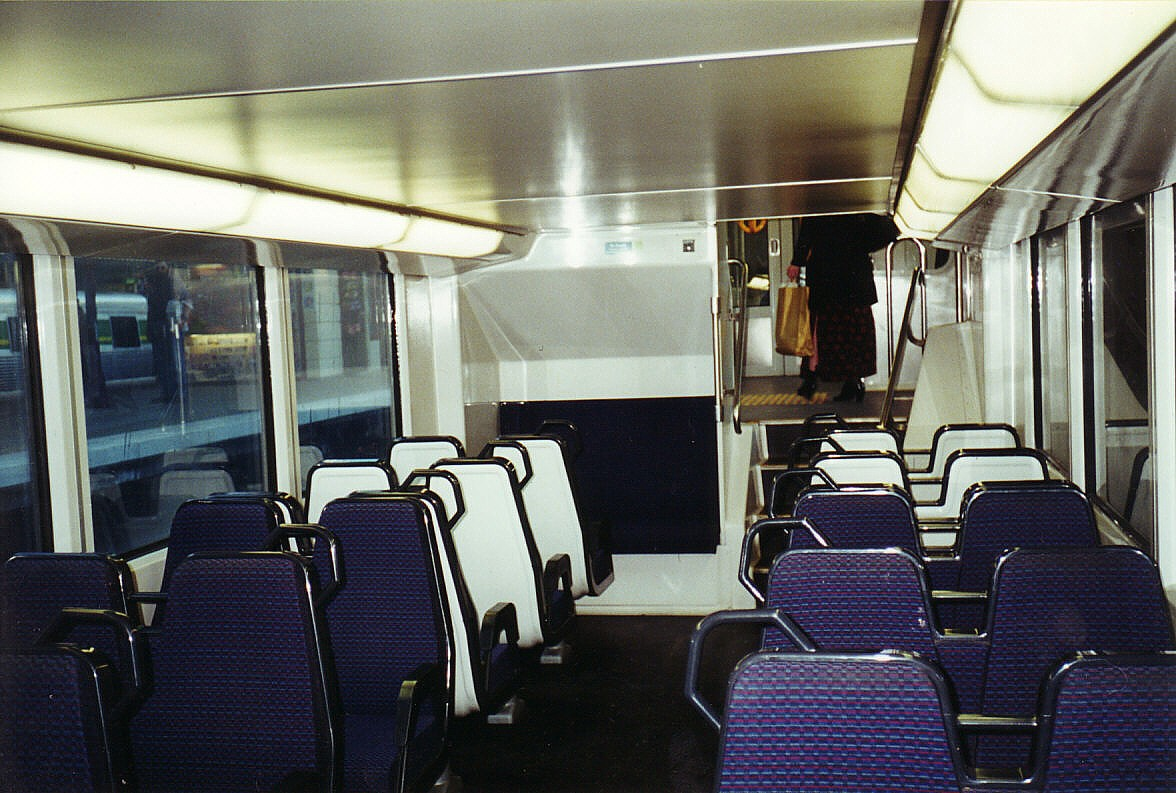
- Lower deck interior showing passenger seats and stairs
- In service: 1992–2002
- Manufacturer: A Goninan & Co
- Built at: Broadmeadow
- Family name: Tangara
- Entered service: 10 March 1992
- Retired: 25 February 2002
- Scrapped: 30 March 2006
- Number built: 4 carriages
- Number scrapped: All carriages
- Formation: 4 carriages
- Fleet numbers: 6000T-5000M-5002M-6002T
- Capacity: 346 seated, 628 standing
- Operator: Public Transport Corporation
- Depot: Bayswater
- Line served: Lilydale Belgrave

Specifications
- Car body construction: Stainless steel
- Car length: 20.32 m (66 ft 8 in)
- Width: 2.89 m (9 ft 6 in)
- Height: 4.27 m (14 ft 0 in)
- Doors: 4 twin-leaf plug doors per carriage
- Wheel diameter: 940 mm (37 in)
- Maximum speed: 130 km/h (81 mph)
- Weight: 186 tonnes (183 long tons; 205 short tons)
- Traction system: Mitsubishi GTO–4-quadrant chopper control
- Traction motors: 8 × Mitsubishi MB-3303-B 170 kW (228 hp) 2-phase DC shunt-wound motor
- Power output: 1,360 kW (1,824 hp)
- Transmission: 4.94:1 (84:17) gear ratio
- Acceleration: 0.75 m/s^{2} (2.5 ft/s^{2})
- Auxiliaries: Toshiba
- Electric systems: 1,500 V DC (nominal) from overhead catenary
- Current collection: Pantograph
- UIC classification: 2′2′+Bo′Bo′+Bo′Bo′+2′2′
- Bogies: Nippon Sharyo bolsterless
- Coupling system: Scharfenberg coupler
- Track gauge: 1,600 mm (5 ft 3 in)

The 4D was a one-off prototype double deck electric multiple unit built for the Public Transport Corporation in Victoria, Australia, for operation on the Melbourne railway system. It remains the only double deck train to have ever operated in Melbourne. The train's name stood for "Double Deck Development and Demonstration".

Depending on sources, the intention was for this train to be the demonstration unit for a future order of either 20 or 50 extra sets, had the tests been successful.

== Design ==
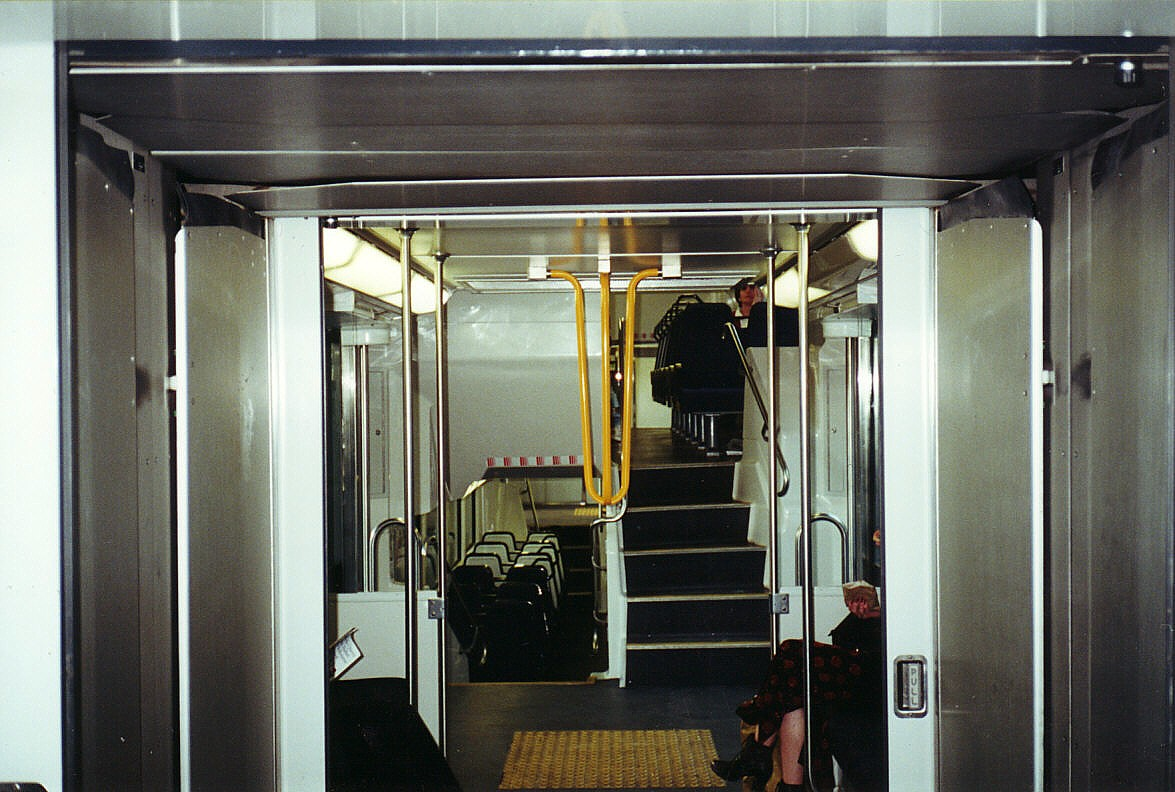
Vestibule, 6000T Interior looking at stairs, seats and door entrance, 2000

A tender for the design and construction of 19 double-deck trains was opened on 24 November 1989. The number of carriages to be built was at the discretion of the builder, however it had to comply with capacity and length requirements. By 11 April 1990, when the tender was closed, a number of tenders were received, including from Comeng and A Goninan & Co. However, the project was stopped by the State Government, due to financial constraints. Instead, The Met was granted approval to acquire a single double-deck train for evaluation purposes. A contract was signed with Goninan in late 1990, for the delivery of a four carriage set.

Built in Broadmeadow, New South Wales, it was delivered by rail into Melbourne on 10 December 1991. After being bogie exchanged, it was transferred to Jolimont Workshops on 18 December of the same year, for an inspection and final fit out. Funding for the train was supplied from both the Victorian and Commonwealth governments.

The train's design was based on the Tangara train being built by A Goninan & Co for CityRail in Sydney, however it was similar only in terms of interior and exterior bodywork; the train's electrical system was much closer to that of the Comeng sets. The design was further modified for use on Melbourne's broad gauge track, and its control system was designed specifically to allow in-service coupling and operation with Comeng sets. In addition, the individual carriages were narrower and shorter in both length and width against their predecessors, to fit the Melbourne loading gauge. Altogether, it was 78 metres long; same length as a four-car Harris set, but seven metres shorter that a three-car Hitachi set.

It was manufactured from stainless steel and was fitted with air-conditioning, tinted windows, and inter-car doors, allowing passengers to access all carriages of the train. Much of the equipment matched Sydney's Tangara fleet, from the traction motors (8x MB 3303B) down to small fittings like console buttons.

The four-car set had a total passenger capacity of 974 passengers (346 seated and 628 standing); considerably more than a three-car Comeng train of similar length, which would only hold 763 passengers in crush load conditions, including 263 seated. However, the set had about the same seating capacity as a Tait train - 10 seats per compartment, 34 compartments per four-carriage set, with no data available on crush loads.

As part of the trial, the Belgrave and Lilydale lines were selected as main testing grounds for the unit and necessary works were performed to accommodate the train's somewhat unconventional dimensions. Preparations for the train occurred at Flinders Street and near the Princes Bridge in May 1991, when the tracks were lowered. The overhead wire to Belgrave and Lilydale was also altered, including the power feeds, and platforms were cut back where required. It was known that the train was physically too large for the Jolimont tunnel between Jolimont and West Richmond stations, on the Hurstbridge and Epping lines. Given that the train was a demonstrator, it was likely that production designs or future infrastructure plans would have dealt with this.

By early 1993, the Victorian Government had decided not to proceed with the acquisition of any further double deck trains, deciding infrastructure changes required to accommodate the larger trains were too expensive.

== Service ==
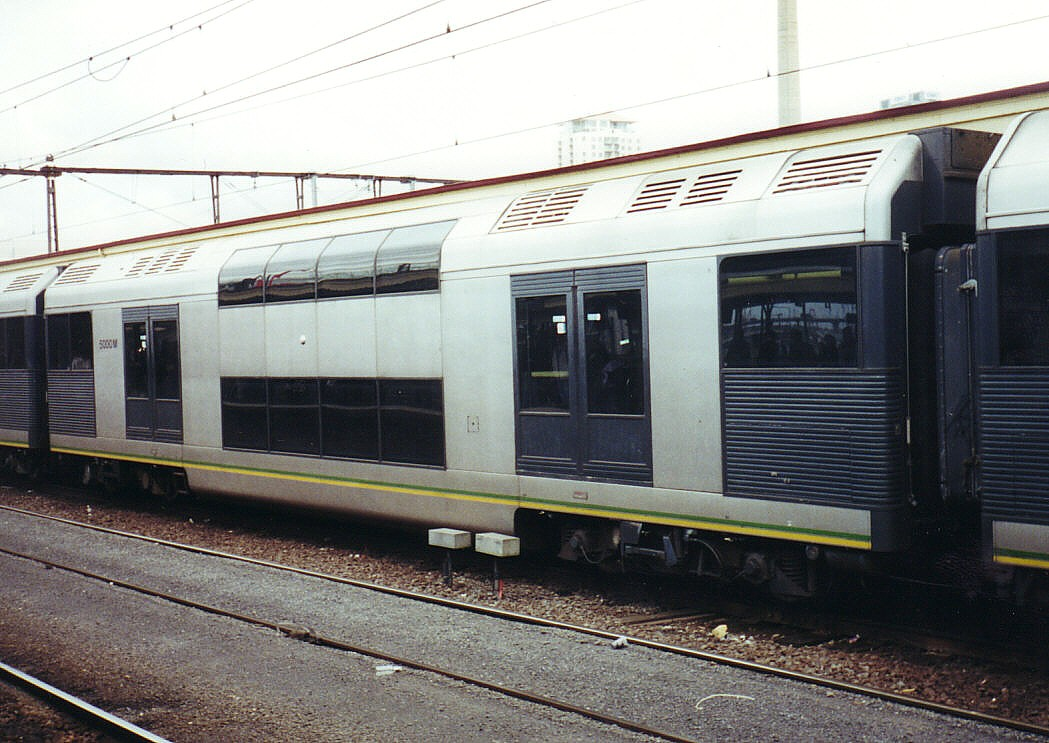
Power car, 2000

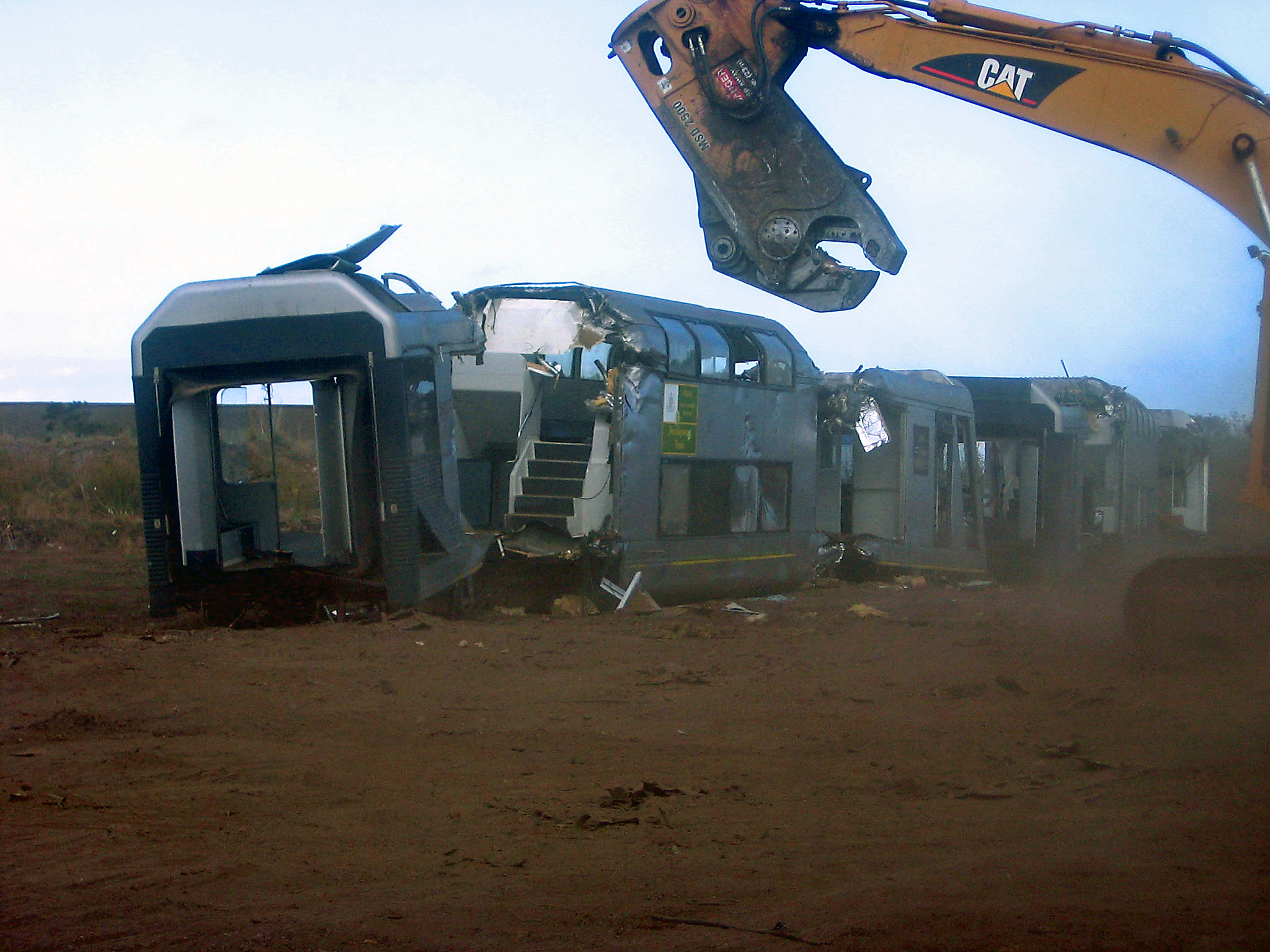
4D carriages being scrapped at Brooklyn Tip, March 2006

The unit broke from Melbourne tradition by being configured as Driving Trailer-Motor-Motor-Driving Trailer (DT-M-M-DT); all other sets in service at the time were configured as Driving Motor-Trailer-Driving Motor (M-T-M). In a further break from tradition, the 4D did not use the 'D' code for a driving trailer, instead it was coded simply as T-M-M-T. The car numbers were also placed far outside the usual range; the 4D was numbered as 6000T-5000M-5002M-6002T.

Most of the time the 4D was on the rails, it was parked in the stabling facilities at Bayswater, on the Belgrave line.

It first ran under its own power on 27 December 1991, when it conducted a test run to Lilydale and back. By January 1992, it was running tests coupled with a Comeng set, testing for performance, clearances and its effect on signalling. By 28 January of the same year, it was conducting tests between Bunyip and Longwarry, on the Gippsland line. Testing continued through February 1992.

On 5 March 1992, it was officially launched. It departed Flinders Street in the morning, running to Parliament station to collect the Minister for Transport and the awaiting media, before proceeding to Ringwood. On the return journey, it stopped at Box Hill and Camberwell. Throughout the remainder of the day, it conducted tours around the City Loop for Public Transport Corporation staff and their family members. Over the Labour Day weekend, this was repeated for the public.

It entered revenue service on 10 March 1992, after testing and a subsequent media launch. Eight trips were scheduled for its first day in service, the first being the 08:36 service from Flinders Street to Box Hill, followed by the 09:08 return, on which the train suffered door problems, the first of its many failures. This required the train to be removed from service at Camberwell, and the cancellation of the remaining trips.

Initially, the 4D was run coupled to a three-car Comeng set until 1996, when, after a troubled conversion to driver-only operation, it was permitted to operate on its own. Often as not, though, it was towed or pushed by a three or six-car Comeng set following a failure.

When the suburban system was split into two in 1998, in preparation for privatisation, it was allocated to Hillside Trains, which became Connex.

Throughout its 10 years in Melbourne, the 4D continued to be plagued by reliability issues that saw it constantly in and out of service. After its disappointing entry to service, the train saw little use and was in storage by 1999. It was revived in June 2000, but lasted only a year.

A final attempt was made on 22 February 2002 to return the set to service, but after three days, it again failed, and was placed back in storage, never to operate in revenue service again.

== Disposal ==
Ownership of the 4D was transferred back to the Victorian Government's Department of Infrastructure, and the set was moved under its own power to Newport Workshops in December 2002, for long-term storage.

By 2004, the set, which was once stored near the Australian Railway Historical Society's railway museum, was transferred to the western side of the workshops, for a potential return to revenue service. However, this did not eventuate, and the 4D remained in storage.

In 2006, the 4D was purchased by RailCorp and stripped of parts compatible with the Tangaras. It was transferred by El Zorro to metal recyclers Sims Metal, Brooklyn for scrapping.
