= Hornsby Maintenance Depot =

Sydney Trains facility

Coordinates: 33.694048°S 151.103495°E

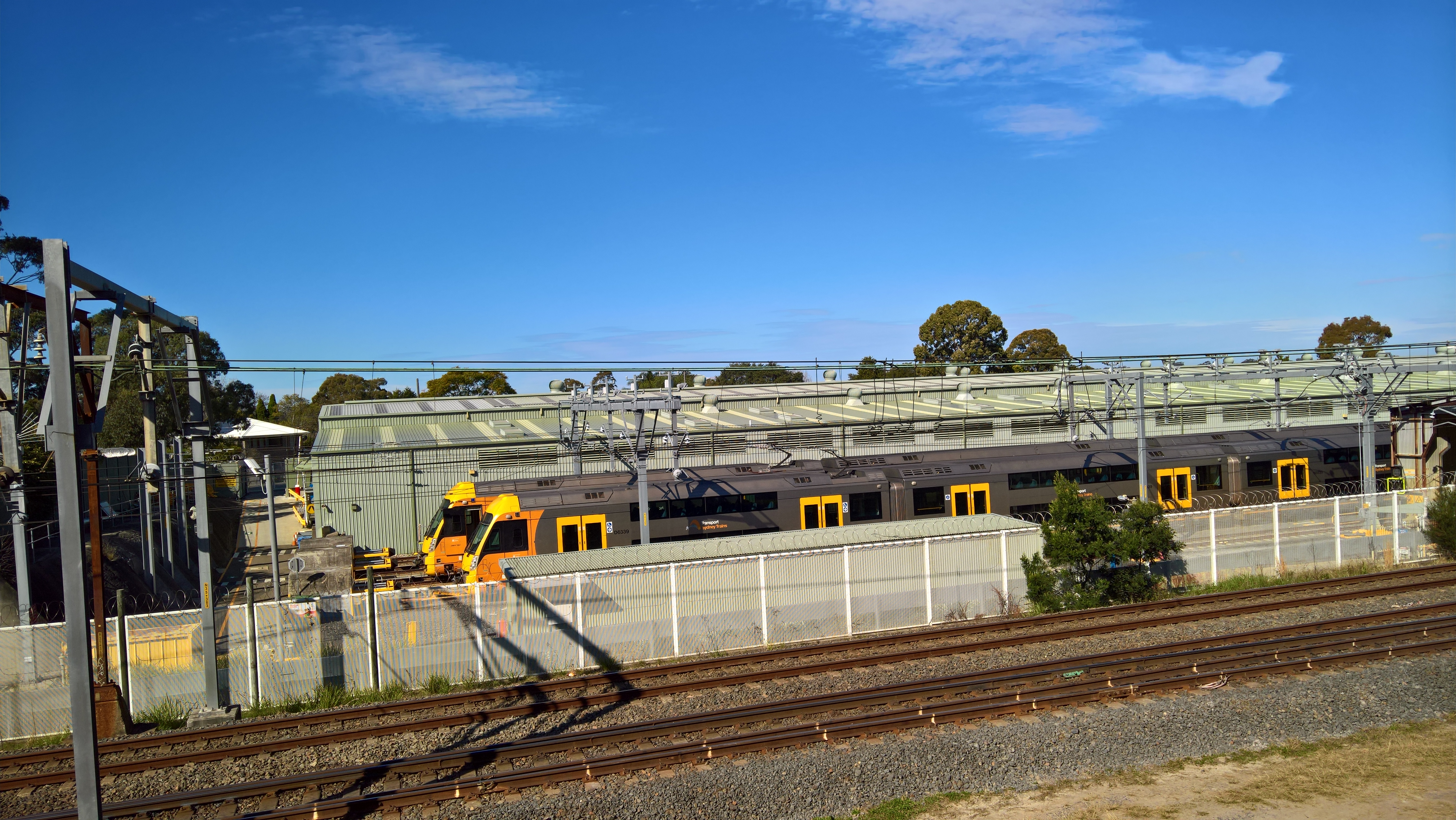
- The depot in 2019
- Interactive map of Hornsby Maintenance Depot

Location
- Location: Stephen Street, Asquith, New South Wales, Australia

Characteristics
- Owner: Transport Asset Manager of New South Wales
- Operator: Sydney Trains
- Roads: 15
- Rolling stock: T sets H sets A sets

History
- Opened: 1928

Hornsby Maintenance Depot is a train depot in the northern Sydney suburb of Asquith, New South Wales, Australia, that primarily services the Sydney Trains fleet. It is located to the north of Hornsby station, a major interchange on the Sydney Trains network, and alongside the Main North line.

The depot opened in 1928 and was one of four electric train depots built under the Bradfield electrification plan, the other depots being at Mortdale, Flemington and Punchbowl (later closed).

The depot features nine roads under the main shed (numbered 1–9), five outdoor roads (numbered 11–15), two of which (11 and 12) are elevated, a train washing facility (16 road) and several short outdoor storage sidings. There are also 8 sidings south of depot used for stabling only. The track layout is such that trains can only enter from the south.

It is a stabling location for A (Waratah) sets, T (Tangara) sets and H (OSCAR) sets and crew depot, for services on the Central Coast and Newcastle, Northern, North Shore, and Western lines. It is also a maintenance depot for H and T sets.

== Maps ==
Hornsby Maintenance Centre.

== See also ==
- Sydney Trains rolling stock
