= Mortdale Maintenance Depot =

Railway rolling stock maintenance depot

Coordinates: 33.9763°S 151.0793°E

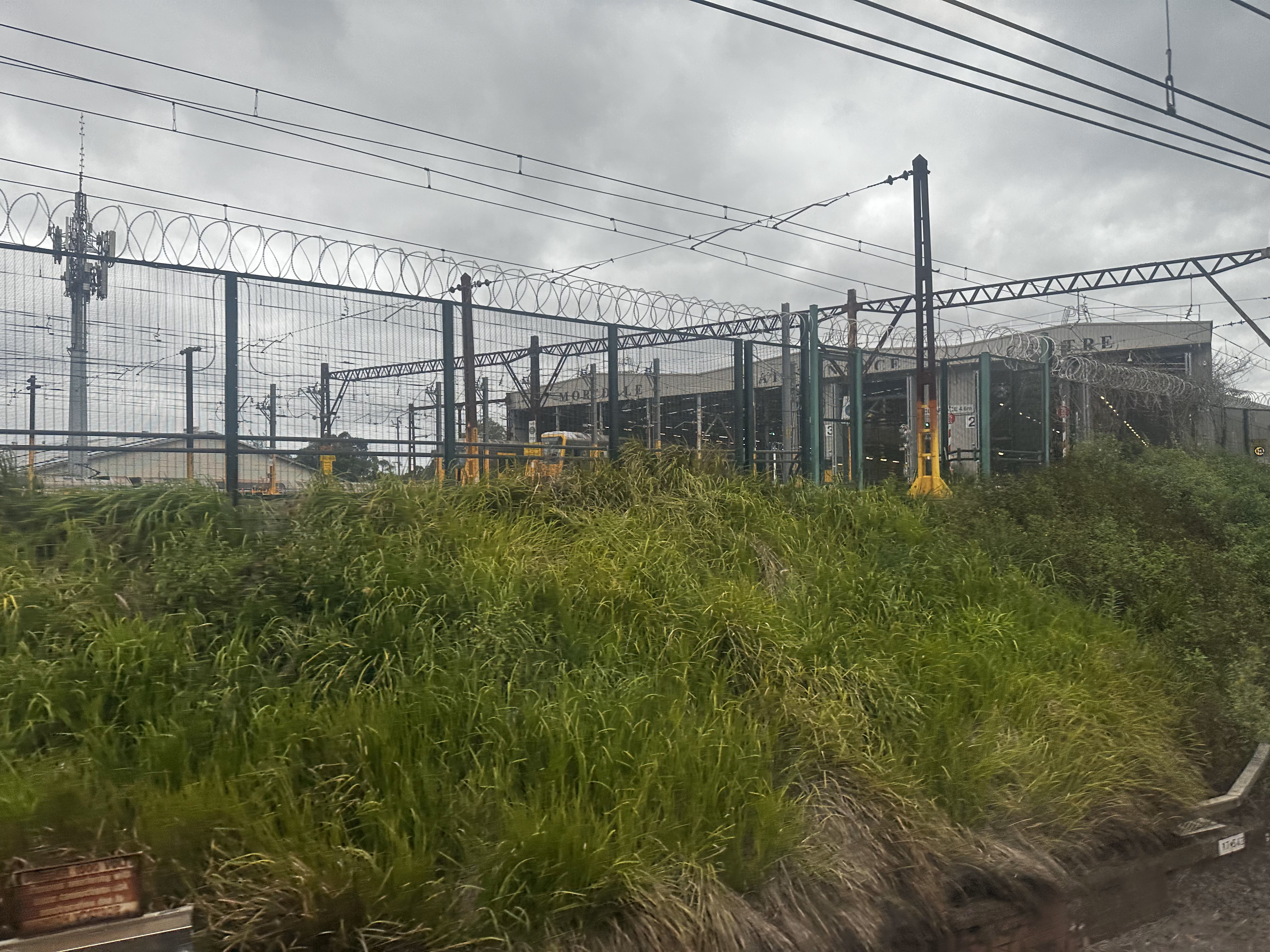
- Mortdale Maintenance Depot from the T4 line, May 2025
- Interactive map of Mortdale Maintenance Depot

Location
- Location: Mortdale

Characteristics
- Owner: Transport Asset Manager of New South Wales
- Operator: Sydney Trains
- Roads: 11
- Rolling stock: T, H sets

History
- Opened: 1925

The Mortdale Maintenance Depot is a Sydney Trains train depot in the southern Sydney suburb of Mortdale.

== Description ==
The depot features nine roads under the main shed (numbered 1–3 and 5–10), two elevated outdoor roads (numbered 11 and 12), a train washing facility and several short outdoor storage sidings. The depot is responsible for the stabling and maintenance of all Tangara (T set) trains on the T4 Eastern Suburbs & Illawarra Line and South Coast Line local services.

Shunters control and authorise train movements within this facility. They are responsible for the amalgamation and division of the Tangara sets to facilitate maintenance and repairs. The shunters are also responsible for the safe passage of trains, staff and other equipment within the facility.

== History ==
The depot opened in 1925 and was one of four electric train depots built under the Bradfield electrification plan, the other depots being at Hornsby, Flemington, and Punchbowl.

Following the opening of the Eastern Suburbs line in 1979, Mortdale became the first all double deck depot to only have S sets allocated to it. The last S set was withdrawn from Mortdale in April 2013. The depot now only has T sets allocated to it.

As of 2020, plans are being prepared to upgrade the depot to increase its maintenance capacity, in preparation for increased services on the Illawarra line as part of the Transport for NSW's More Trains, More Services program.

== Maps ==
Mortdale Maintenance Centre.
