= Flemington Maintenance Depot =

Sydney Trains facility

Coordinates: 33.863°S 151.059°E

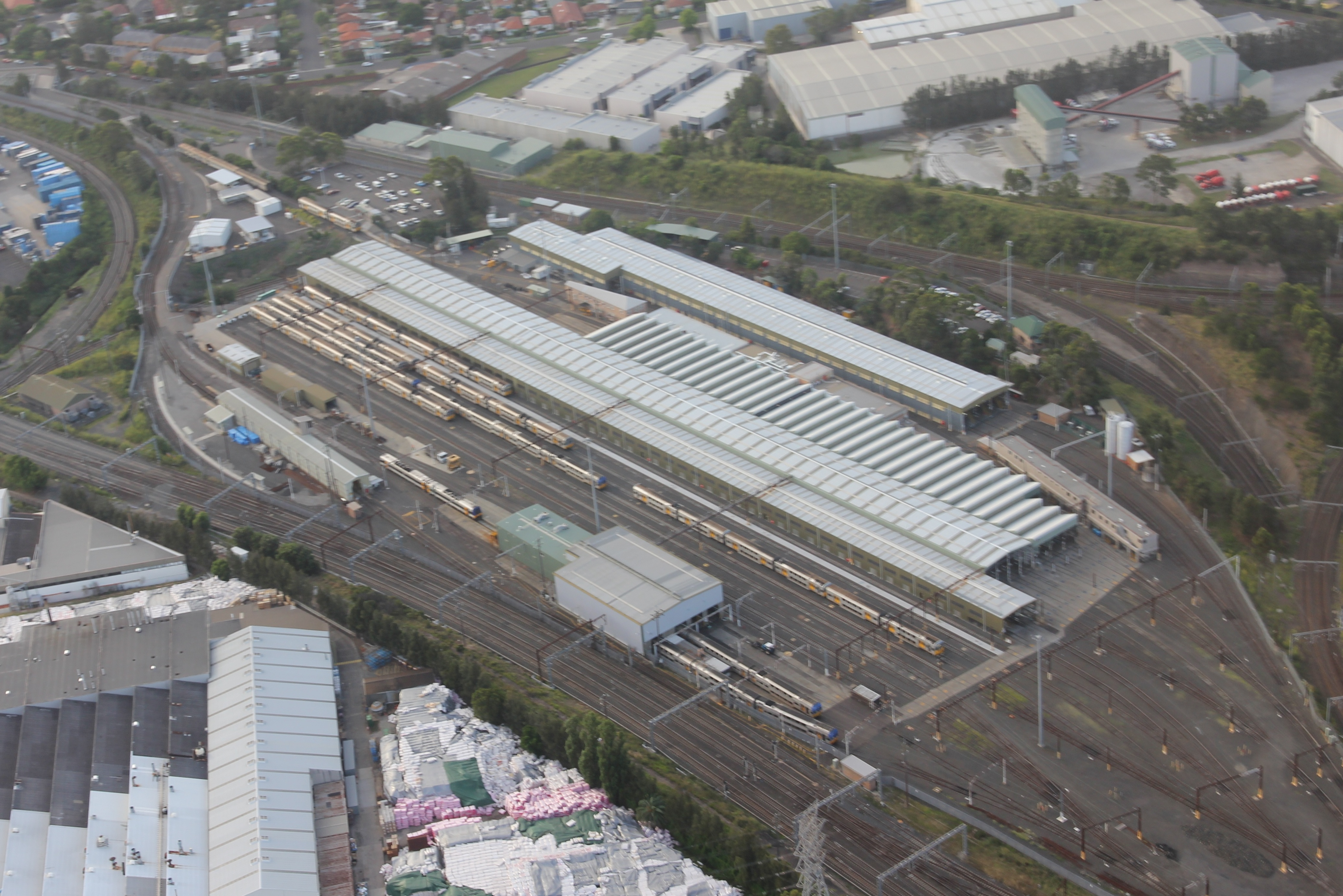
- Aerial view of Flemington Maintenance Depot, 2011
- Interactive map of Flemington Maintenance Depot

Location
- Location: Bachell Avenue, Lidcombe

Characteristics
- Owner: Transport Asset Manager of New South Wales
- Operator: Sydney Trains
- Roads: 20
- Rolling stock: K sets

History
- Opened: 1927

The Flemington Maintenance Depot is a Sydney Trains depot, located in the western Sydney suburb of Lidcombe, but named after the suburb of Flemington further east.

The depot opened in 1927 and was one of four electric train depots built under the Bradfield electrification plan, the other depots being at Mortdale, Hornsby and Punchbowl. The depot features 20 storage roads, 10 of which are under the main shed, a lift shop, wheel lathe and a train washing facility. The depot has rail connections to all tracks of the Main Suburban Line, as well as the Sydney Freight Network. Road access for deliveries is off Bachell Avenue, Lidcombe. A staff-only stuttle bus, operated by CDC, operates between the depot and Lidcombe station.

The depot previously maintained the K sets before they were withdrawn from service. It was also responsible for the S sets, C sets and V sets before they were withdrawn. Sets maintained by Flemington carry a blue target plate. A variety of other trains are also stabled here, as it is a crew depot and stabling location for Sector 2 (T2/T3/T5/T7 lines) services. Endeavours and XPTs occasionally visit to use the wheel lathe.

Until May 1968, it was responsible for maintaining the long-distance HUB, RUB and stainless steel carriages. Until March 1971, it also maintained the DEB sets. All were transferred to ACDEP.

== Maps ==
Flemington Maintenance Centre.

The Sydney Trains maintenance centres. Flemington is in blue.
