= New South Wales T set =

Class of electric train operating in Sydney, Australia

T set
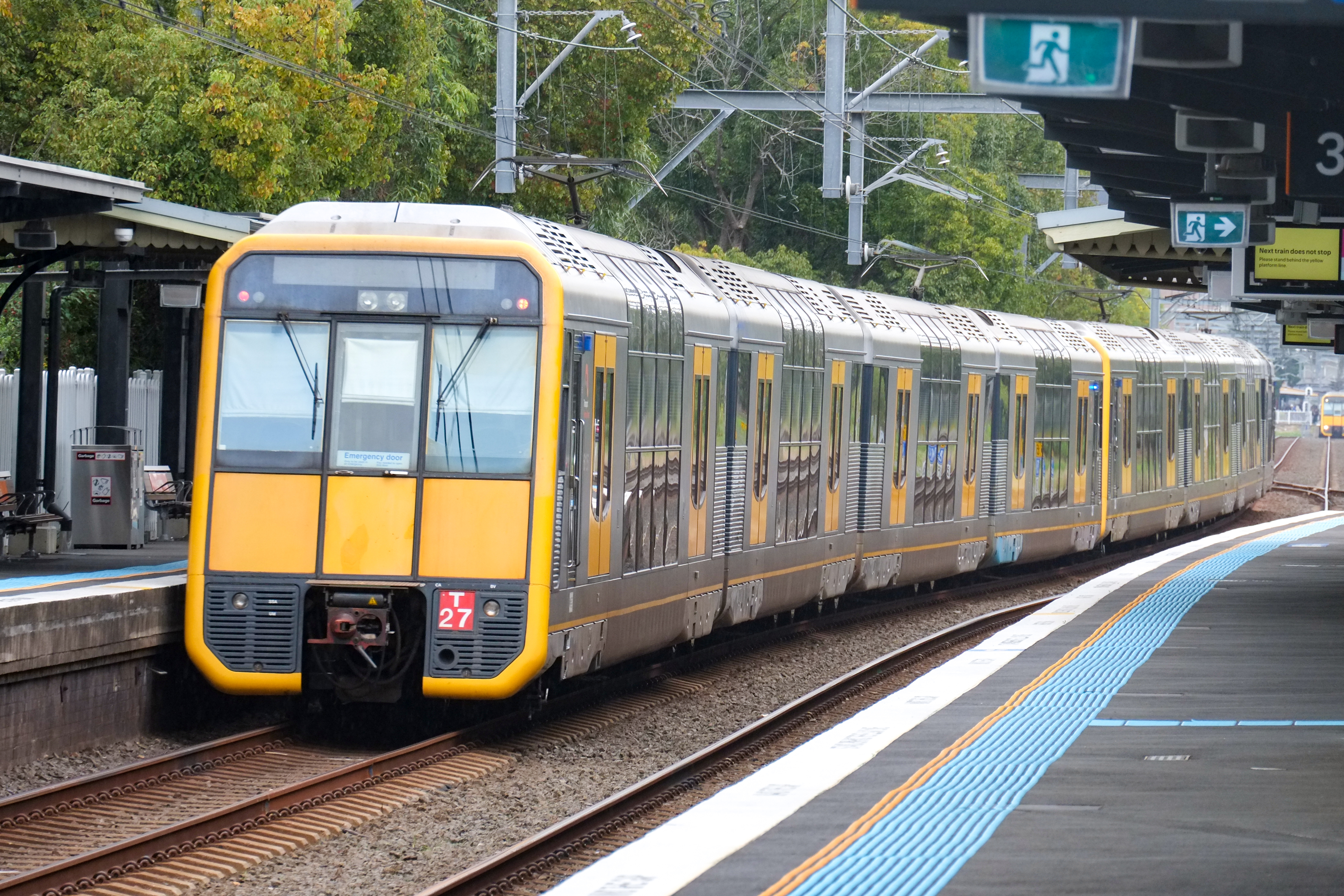
- T27 passing through Banksia railway station in 2023

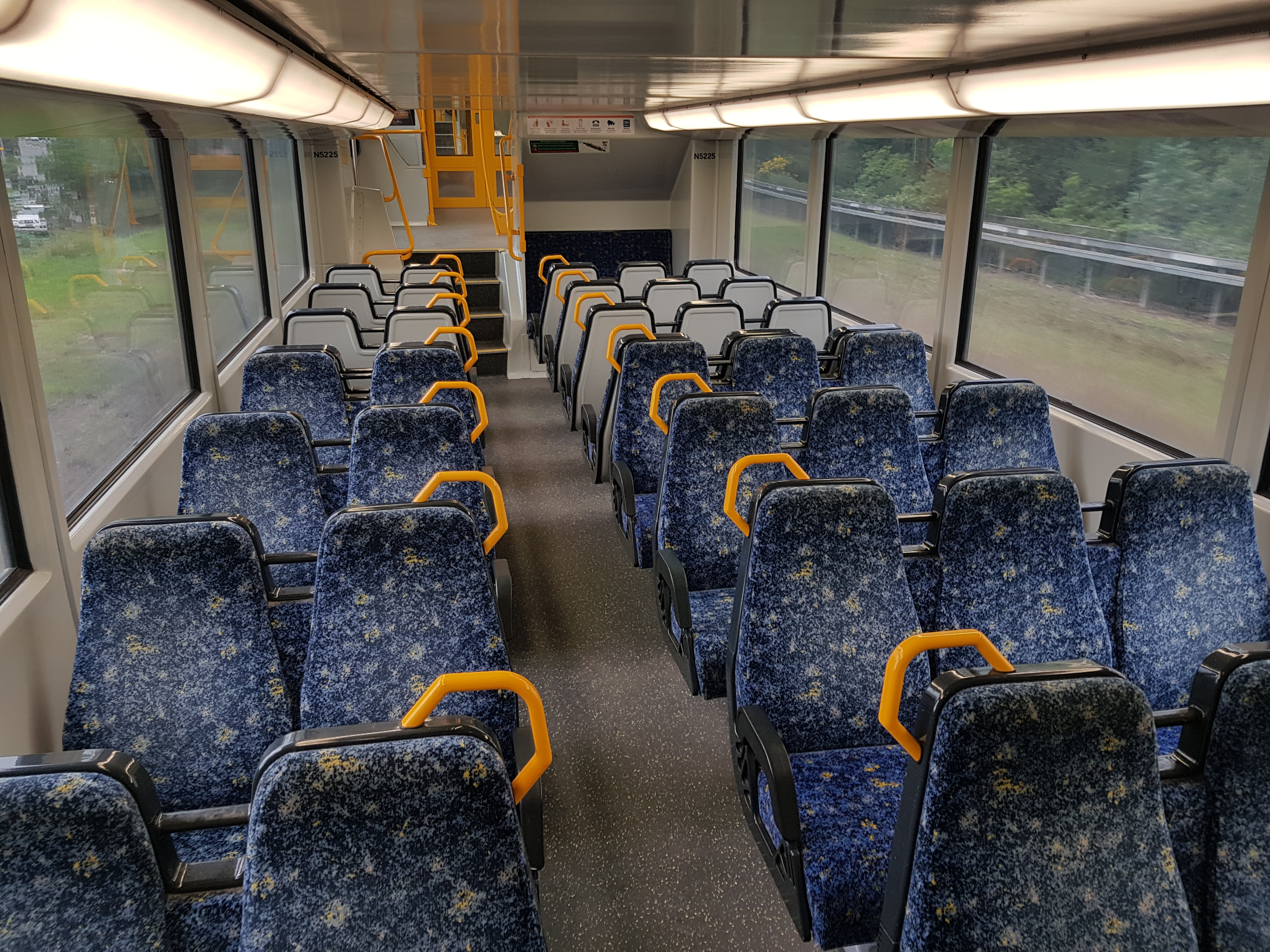
- Refurbished interior
- Stock type: Electric multiple unit
- In service: 1988–present
- Manufacturer: A Goninan & Co
- Built at: Broadmeadow
- Constructed: 1987–1997
- Entered service: 12 April 1988
- Refurbished: 2003, 2010–2014, 2021, 2025–2028
- Number built: 455 carriages
- Number in service: 438 carriages (~109 sets)
- Number retired: 17 carriages
- Number scrapped: 8 carriages
- Formation: Semi-permanent 8-car sets (can be broken up into 4-car sets for limited shunting movements only)
- Fleet numbers: T1–T54, T57–T65, T67–T81, T83, T86, T88–T110, T121, T122, T125–T130
- Capacity: 98 in driving trailers, 112 in motor cars
- Operator: Sydney Trains
- Depots: Hornsby; Mortdale
- Lines served: North Shore & Western; Leppington & Inner West; Eastern Suburbs & Illawarra; Olympic Park (special events only); Airport & South; Northern

Specifications
- Train length: 81.08 m (266 ft 0 in) (Note: Former G sets are 81.21 m (266 ft 5 in).)
- Car length: 20,320 mm (66 ft 8 in) (D) (Note: Former G set cars are 20,385 mm (66 ft 11 in).); 20,220 mm (66 ft 4 in) (N)
- Width: 3 m (9 ft 10 1/8 in)
- Height: 4,413 mm (14 ft 5 3/4 in)
- Doors: Pneumatic Plug-style, twin leaf
- Wheel diameter: 940 mm (37 in)
- Maximum speed: 130 km/h (81 mph) (design); 115 km/h (71 mph) (service)
- Weight: 50 t (49 long tons; 55 short tons) (N) (Note: Former G set cars are 53 t (52 long tons; 58 short tons).); 42 t (41 long tons; 46 short tons) (D) (Note: Former G set cars are 45 t (44 long tons; 50 short tons).)
- Traction system: Mitsubishi GTO–4-quadrant chopper control
- Traction motors: 8 × Mitsubishi MB-3303-B 170 kW (228 hp) 2-phase DC shunt-wound motor
- Power output: 1,360 kW (1,824 hp)
- Transmission: 4.94:1 (84:17) gear ratio
- Acceleration: 0.6–0.8 m/s^{2} (2.0–2.6 ft/s^{2})
- Deceleration: 0.9 m/s^{2} (3.0 ft/s^{2}) (service); 1.2 m/s^{2} (3.9 ft/s^{2}) (emergency)
- Auxiliaries: Toshiba
- Electric systems: 1,500 V DC (nominal) from overhead catenary
- Current collection: Pantograph
- UIC classification: 2′2′+Bo′Bo′+Bo′Bo′+2′2′
- Bogies: Nippon Sharyo bolsterless
- Safety system: ETCS
- Coupling system: Scharfenberg coupler
- Track gauge: 1,435 mm (4 ft 8 1/2 in) standard gauge

The T sets, also referred to as the Tangara trains, are a class of double-decker electric multiple units (EMU) that operate on the Sydney Trains network in New South Wales, Australia. Built by A Goninan & Co, the sets entered service between 1988 and 1995, initially under the State Rail Authority and later on CityRail. The T sets were built as "third-generation" trains for Sydney's rail fleet, coinciding with the final withdrawals of the "Red Rattler" sets from service in the late 1980s and early 1990s.

The Tangaras were initially built as two classes; the long-distance intercity G sets and the suburban T sets, before being merged after successive refurbishments. Following the retirement of the K sets in 2026, the Tangaras are now the oldest active electric trains in Sydney's rail fleet.

== Design ==
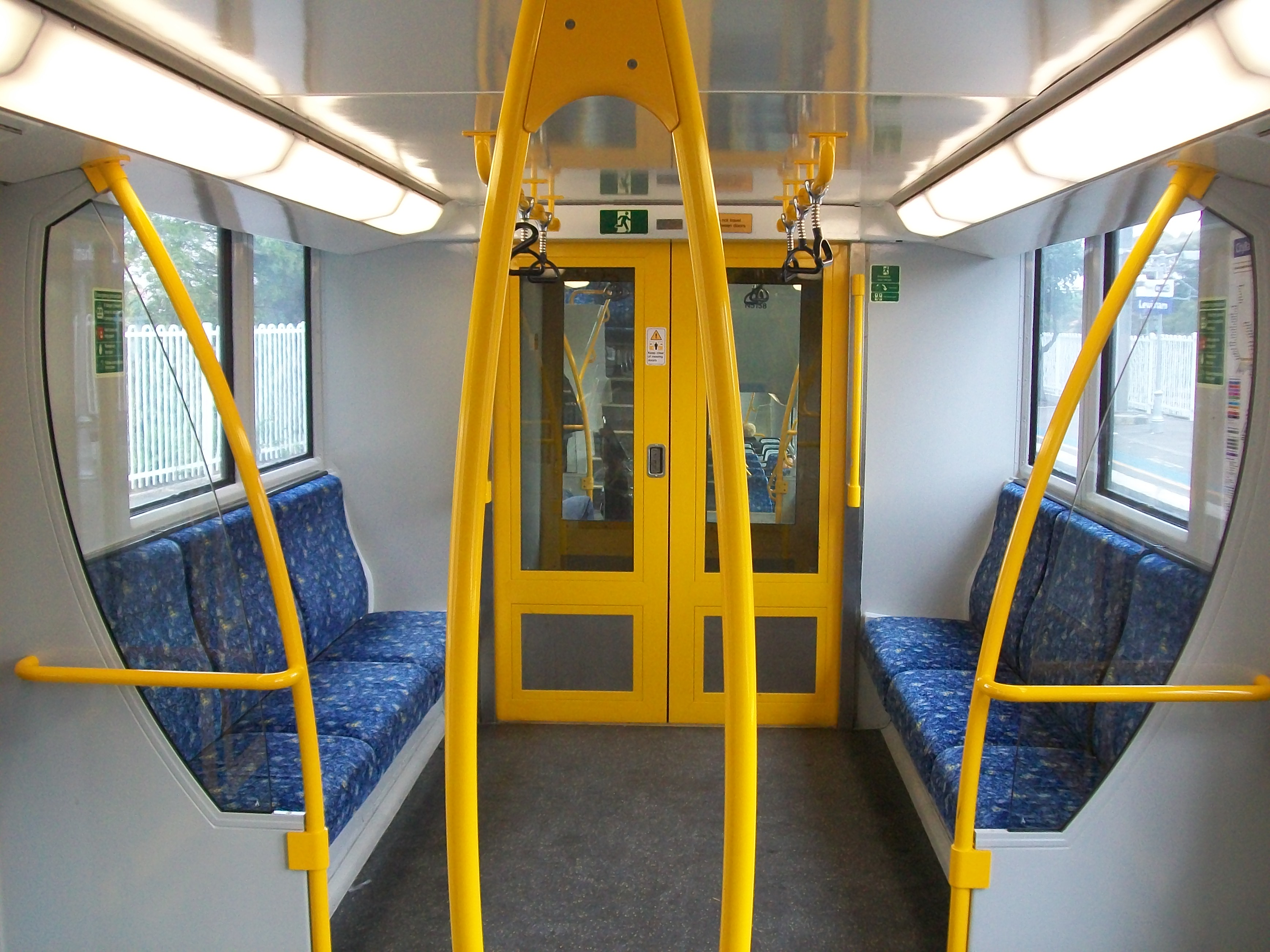
Vestibule, January 2008

The Tangaras are arranged in double-deck four-car sets, with the two outer cars being driving control trailers (carrying a D prefix) that are fitted with one pantograph each and the middle two cars being non-control motor cars (carrying an N prefix). All sets are equipped with Mitsubishi Electric chopper control.

Unlike most other Sydney Trains rolling stock, the seats on the suburban T sets are fixed, meaning that half the seats face backwards. Former or refurbished G sets, however, do have reversible seats.

== History ==
=== Initial delivery ===
The SRA called for tenders in 1985 for the manufacture of the next generation of Sydney's double-deck suburban trains. Unusually, a second tender was called for the industrial design of the trains. Domestic train manufacturers were not permitted to submit bids for the industrial design, but they were expected to build to the winning industrial designer's entry. The eventual winning design came from English firm DCA Design Consultants.

In July 1986, the Government of New South Wales awarded A Goninan & Co the contract to manufacture 450 carriages for $530 million. While Goninan were the lead contractor, 10% of the work was initially awarded to Clyde Engineering and Commonwealth Engineering, who were to share the production of the bogies. A limited number of bogies were initially manufactured, Comeng manufacturing them at Mittagong and Clyde fitting them out at Bathurst, but the arrangement proved to be impractical and Goninan ended up building the entire trains. In 1993, it was decided that the last 80 carriages of the order would be built to a modified design to operate peak-hour services to Wyong, Port Kembla and Dapto. In 1996, five spare driving trailers were ordered.

The Tangara name is from an Aboriginal language, meaning to go.

Two subclasses of Tangara were built, the suburban sets targeted as T sets, and outer-suburban sets originally targeted as G sets. The T sets replaced the first generation of Sydney's electric rolling stock.

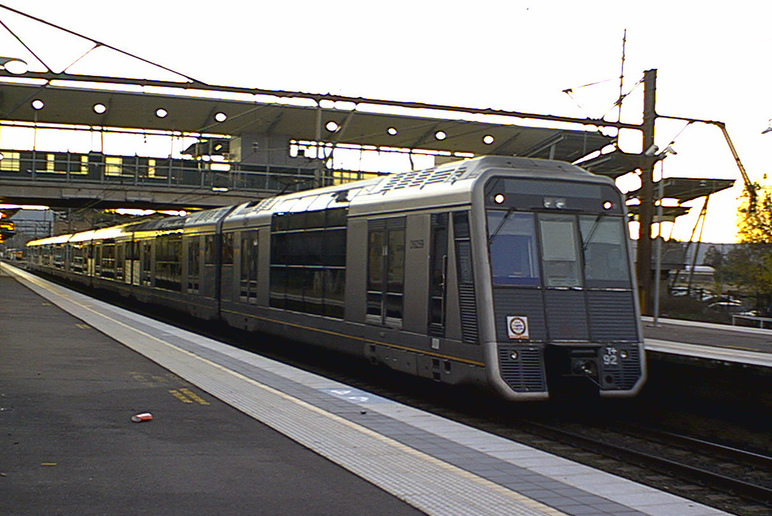
T sets

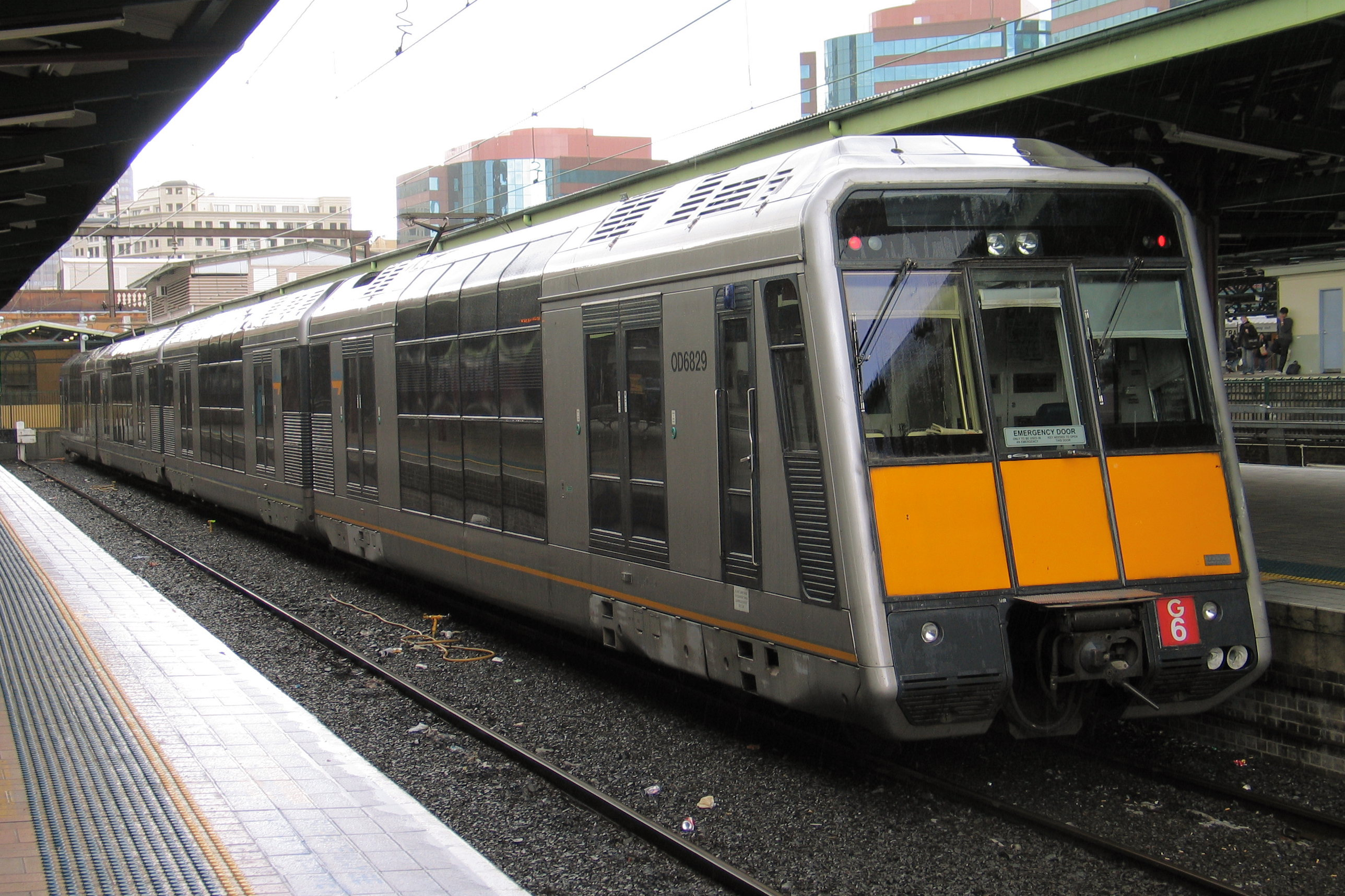
G sets

Original liveries

The first train (set T20) was unveiled at Sydney Central in December 1987, heavily promoted as the "train of the 21st century", operating a promotional service on 28 January 1988 targeted as TAN1, and entering regular service on 12 April 1988. The final T set (set T59, formerly T92) was delivered in February 1994 and the final G set (set T100, formerly G32) in October 1995.

The cars built were:

- T set driving trailer cars: D6101–D6284 with additional spare cars D6285–D6289
- T set non-driving motor cars: N5101–N5284 with additional spare car N5285
- G set driving trailer cars: OD6801–OD6840 with additional spare car OD6841
- G set non-driving motor cars: ON5801–ON5820
- G set non-driving motor cars with toilet: ONL5851–ONL5870

Tangaras were the first Sydney suburban trains to feature plug-style doors. These were initially passenger-operated (similar to C-sets at the time), permitting doors to remain shut if no passengers needed to enter or exit, potentially improving air conditioning efficiency. However these were allegedly unpopular and eventually removed from T-sets. The outer-suburban G-sets however retained push-button operated doors.

Set G7 was fitted with an AC drive system for evaluation purposes with the existing DC stock and compatibility with signalling and communication systems on the network. G7 was scrapped in 2005 at Maintrain, Auburn after the Waterfall rail accident, as all four cars were beyond repair.

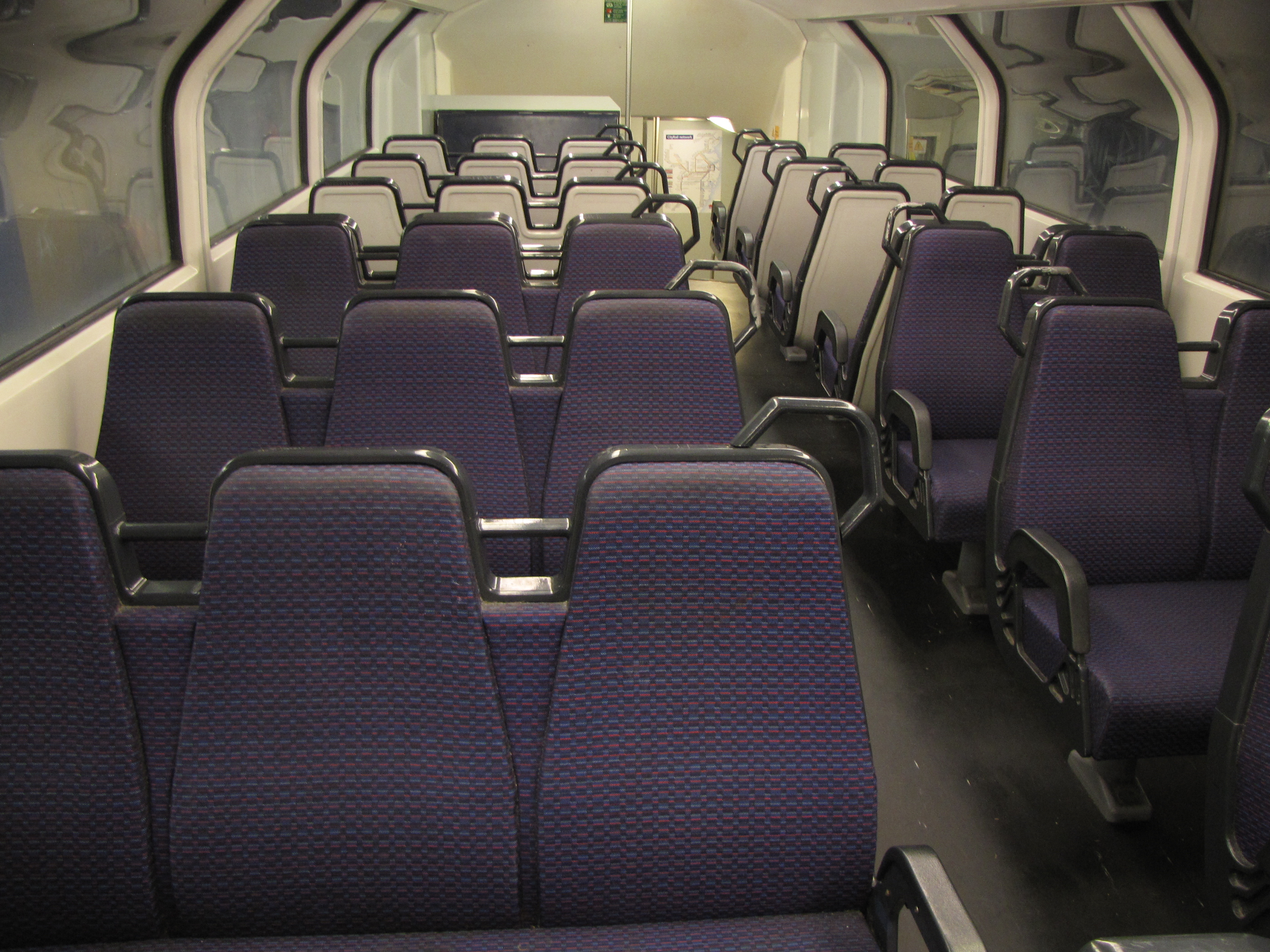
Original interior, November 2010

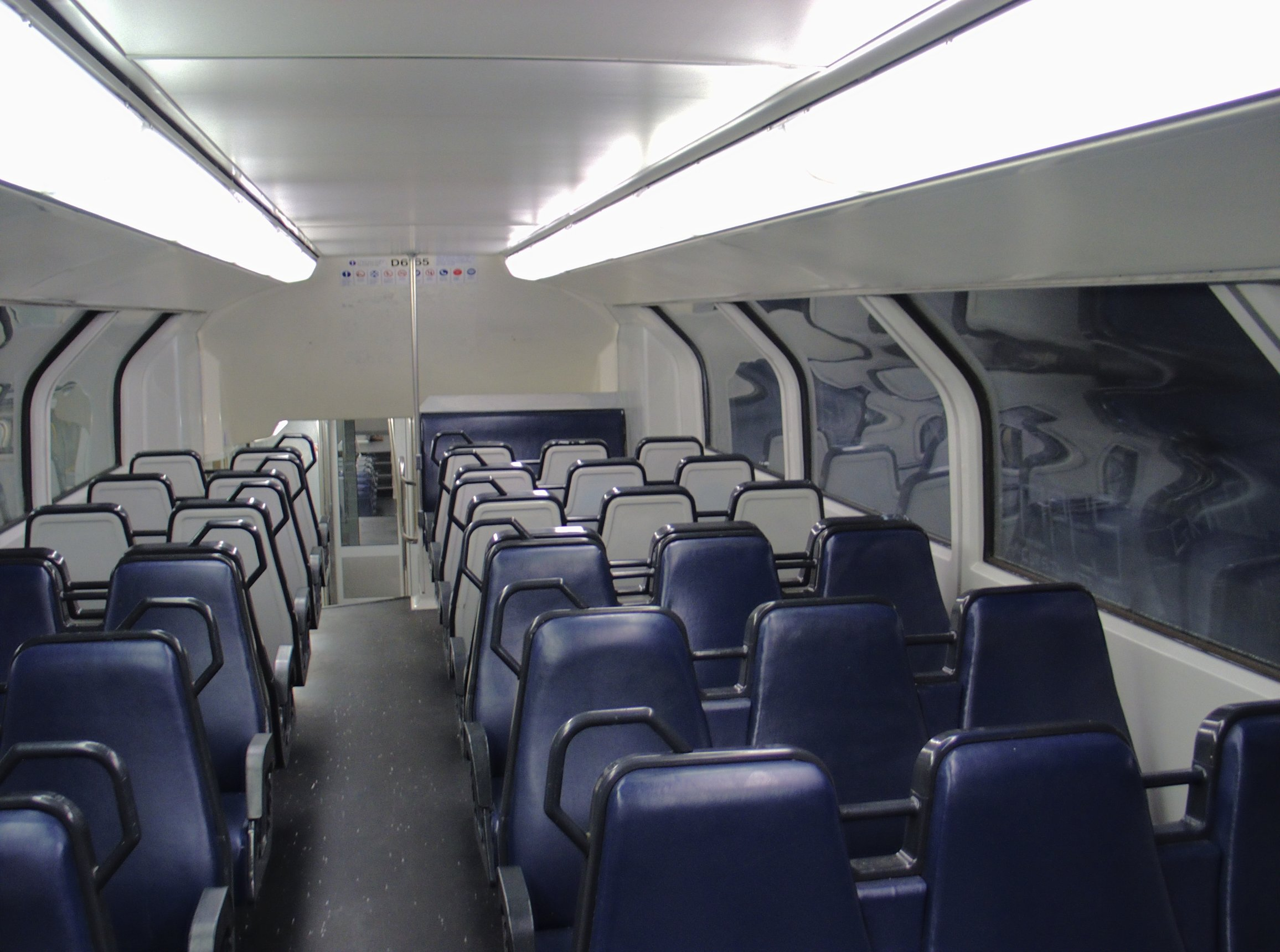
First refurbishment, August 2007

=== High Speed Trials ===
In early 2000, set G7 was also subject to high-speed testing (to the XPT speed limits) up to 150 km/h between Blacktown and St Marys and 140 km/h between Hornsby and Newcastle.

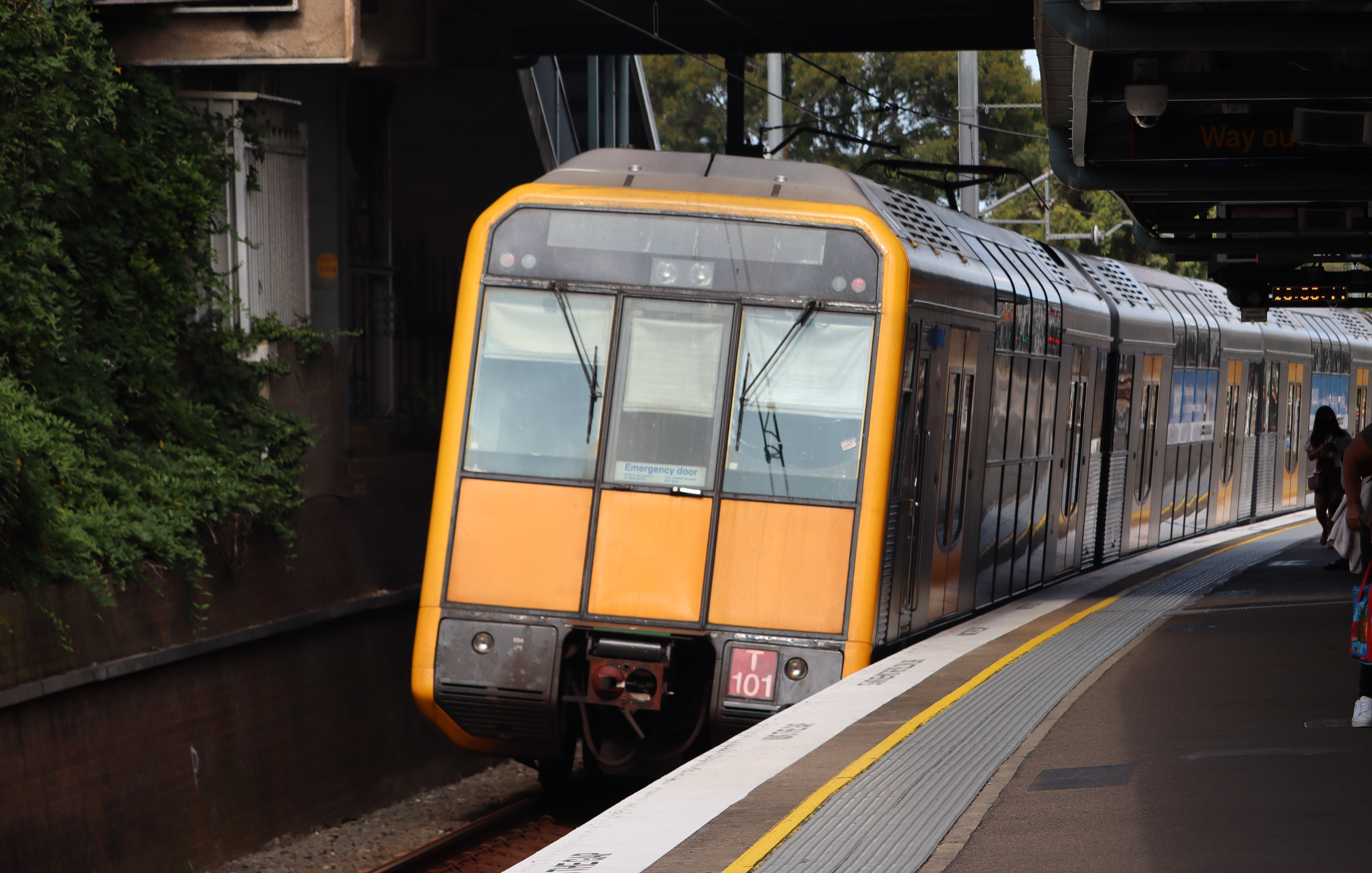
A converted G set, March 2021

=== Upgrades in the 2010s ===
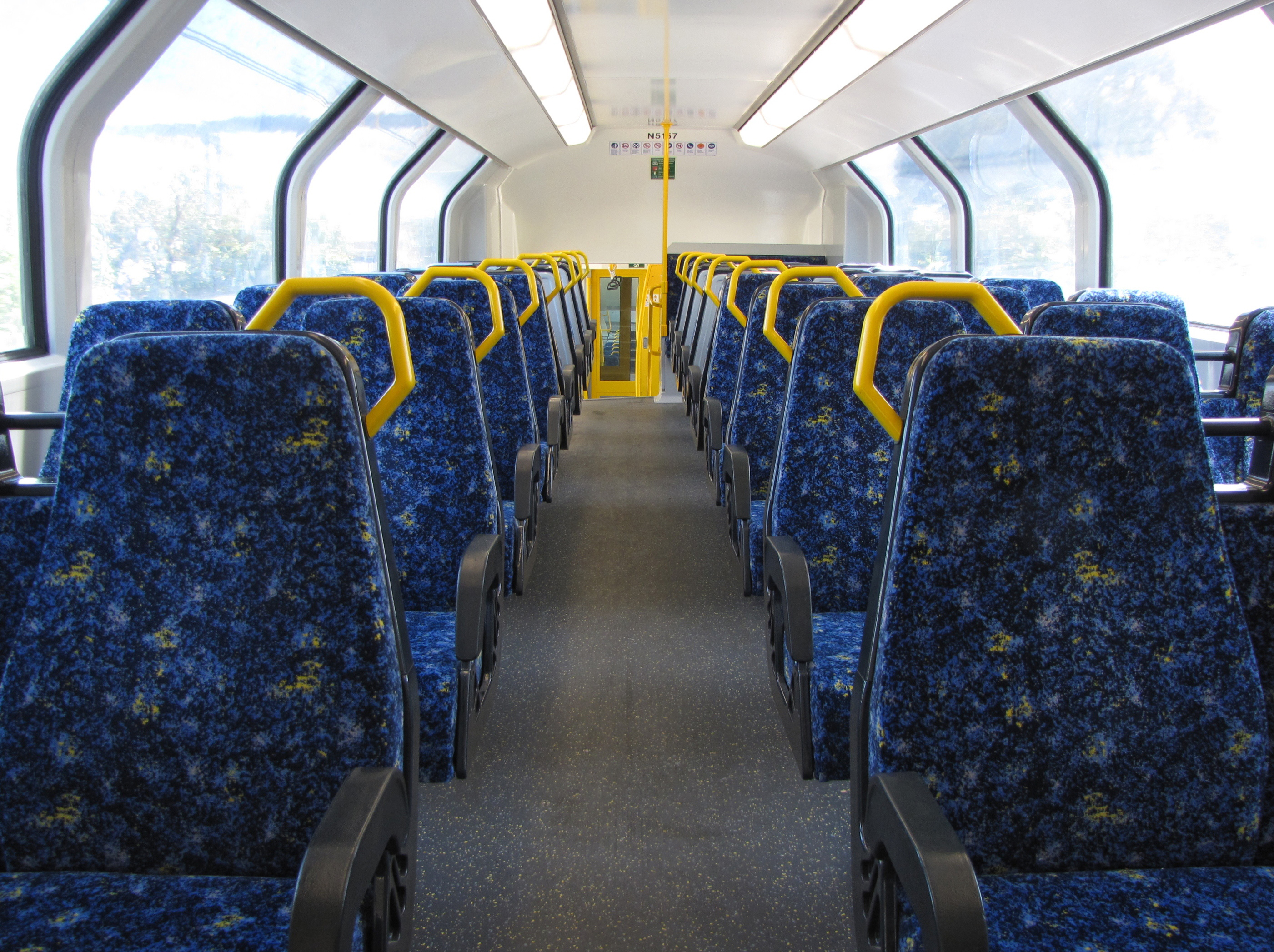
T sets

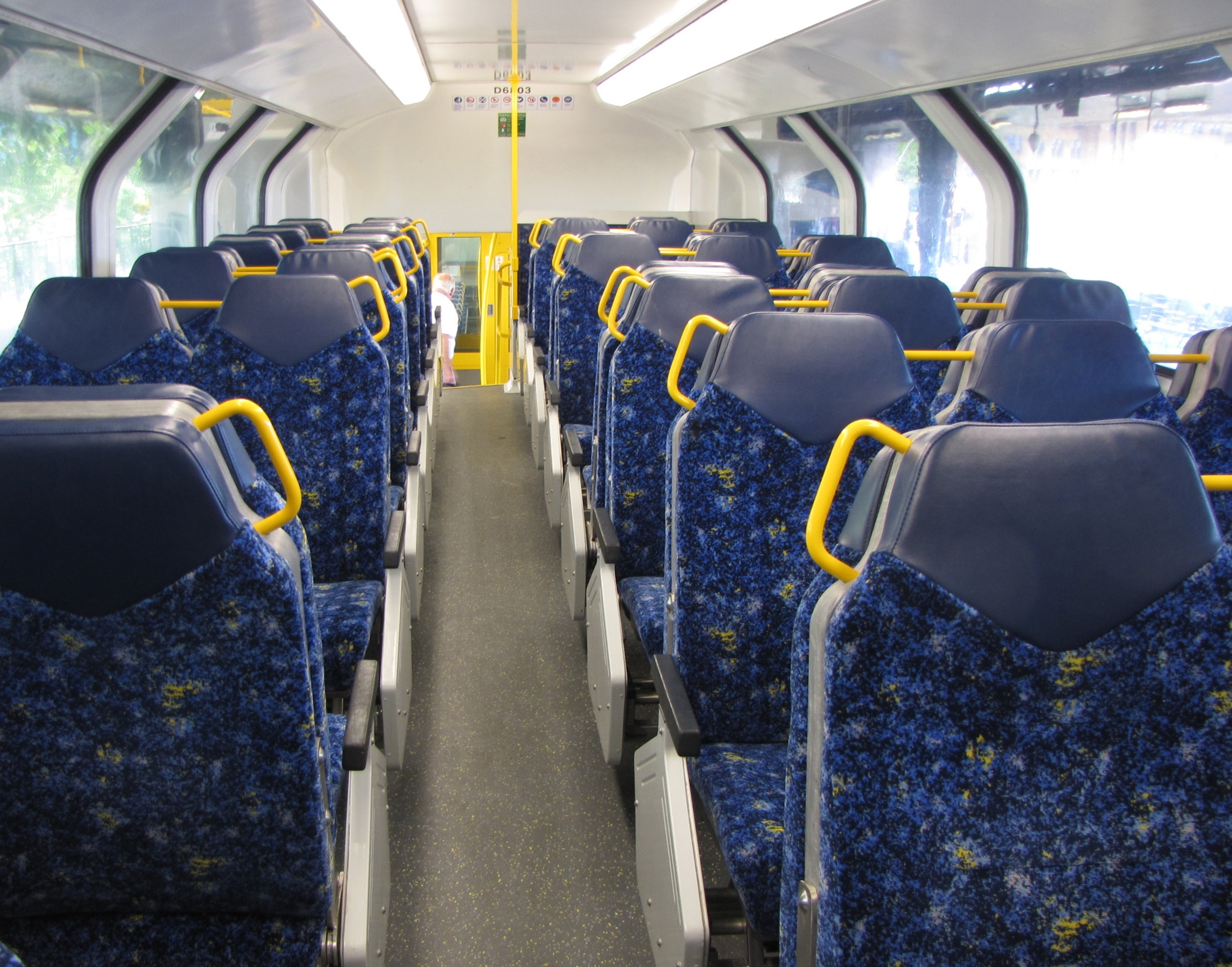
Ex-G sets

Second refurbishment

In 2010, a refresh of the Tangaras commenced with the interiors repainted, and new seat moquette and handrails fitted. From 2011, all G sets were reclassified as T sets, and had their onboard toilets removed.

In July 2013, Sydney Trains trialled rearranging the seating on the upper and lower decks of two carriages. There were 16 fewer seats per carriage; 3x2 seats were replaced by 2x2 seats in one carriage (N5134 on set T78) while in the other carriage (N5131 on set T77) there are double seats on one side and a bench style seating on the other. Both carriages were later returned to the normal 3x2 arrangement.

In 2014, phase one of a technology upgrade program, aiming to improve reliability and upgrade ageing components, was underway. A contract for phase two of the program, aiming to extend the life of these trains and bring technology into line with newer trains was awarded to UGL Limited in August 2015. This was expected to be completed by July 2018. The expected completion date was revised to 2019, but by February 2023 only 2 sets had entered service with the second phase upgrades.

The first phase of the program involved upgrading the passenger doors to cut down on vandalism, as the steel panels on the original doors were prone to being kicked out by vandals. The door kicking incidents often led to unnecessary delays as the guard had to lock off the affected carriage. The new lightweight passenger doors have a similar design to the doors on the M sets. This phase of the project was completed at the end of July 2016. The first set to receive the new doors was T96, in October 2014.

The second phase of the program was initially set to include destination indicators and digital voice announcements, which were installed in T72 and T106, were not installed in other sets due to delays and issues with the DVA system. The upgrade still went ahead however, with vestibules given modifications including marked priority seating and Automatic Train Protection (ATP). The first sets with this revised phase 2 upgrade, T52 and T73, re-entered service on 12 November 2021. All sets have been given the phase 2 upgrade.

The program includes overhauling air conditioning units, static inverter upgrades, and modifications to the driver's desk/cab.

Other anti-vandal improvements included the introduction of 'Mousetrap' sensors. Trialed in 2015, these sensors are able to detect vapors from strong permanent markers and spray paint; triggering an in-built camera feed which is relayed to Sydney Trains staff as well as the Police Transport Command. They were then installed in most converted G sets.

=== Upgrades in the 2020s ===
On 5 June 2024, it was announced the Tangaras would be receiving a life extension to enable operation until at least 2036. The upgrades will see upgrades to the doors, train operating system, and improved disability access and passenger information systems.

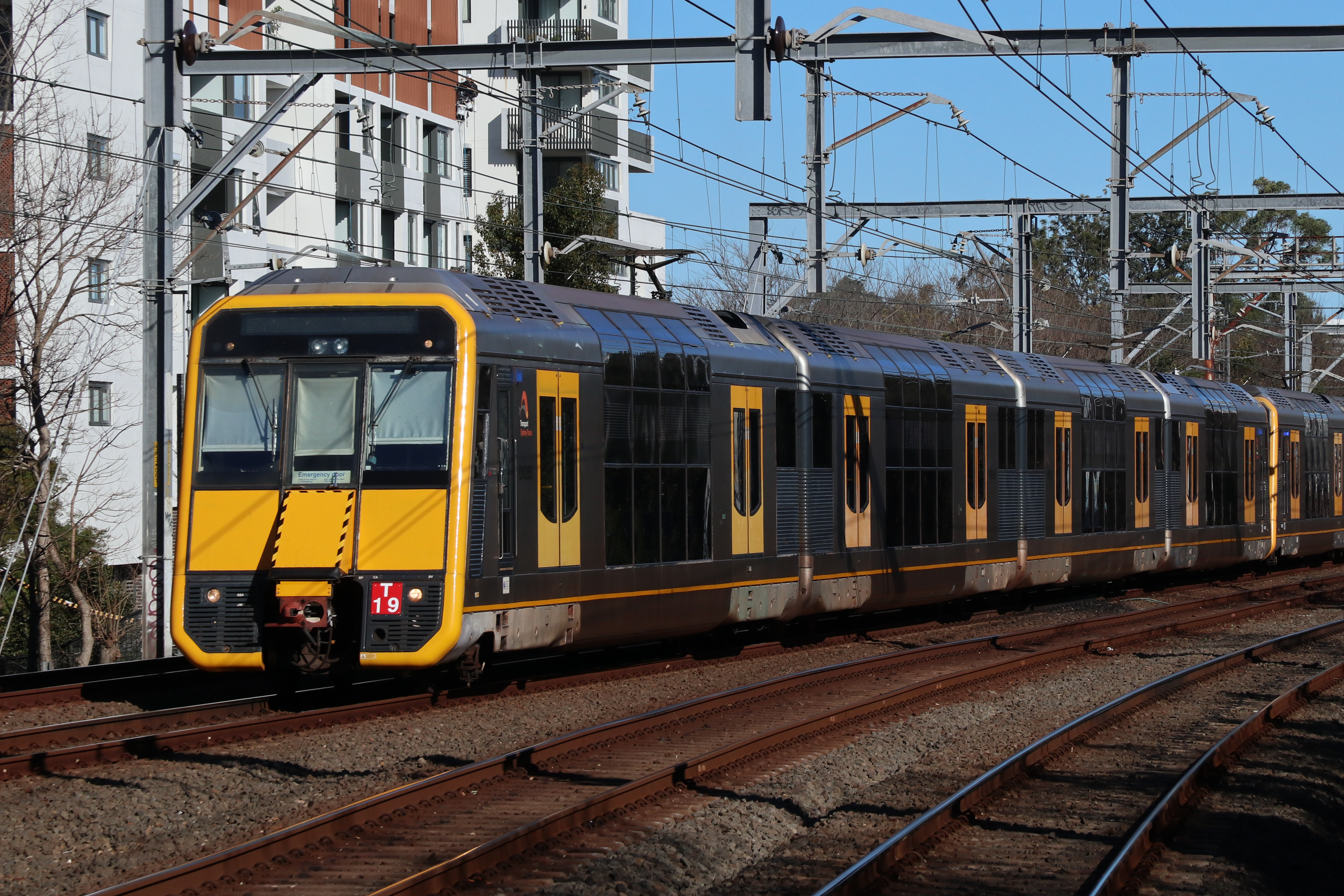
Tangara T19 with an anti-trainsurfing installation, July 2025

In June 2025, sets T19 and T35 entered service featuring the installation of an angled box on the front emergency doors to prevent train surfing. The addition is due to be installed on all sets in the future. These sets are colloquially referred to by the railfan community as "Duckgaras".

In September 2025, sets T76 and T128 were sighted in a new livery. The doors and cab fronts had been repainted a burnt orange in lieu of the previous yellow, to more closely match the modern Sydney Trains colour scheme. In November 2025, it was announced that T76 and T128 had completed their life extension project announced in June 2024. Alongside the updated livery, additions include new passenger information screens and CCTV.

The Life Extension Project for the Tangara fleet also included external changes to train fronts, such as new external destination boards as well as on T128 replacing the grilles covering the horns and fog light with a metal panel. Other upgrades have been implemented such as improved driver controls with touchscreens, upgraded internal gangway doors featuring push buttons as opposed to the old pneumatic handles, a change in the doors closing announcement similar to that on the Millennium M sets, as well as upgraded internal help points. In August 2026, T76/T128 re-entered service with the upgrades.

In late September 2026, the Minister for Transport, John Graham informed Parliament that the refurbished train had only operated five times since coming online. As of October 2026, the train had not run since the 17^{th} of September. Sources from within the government at the time claimed the upgrades are expected to be completed on the rest of the fleet by 2029.

== Service ==
=== Lines serviced ===
The Tangaras usually operate on the following lines:

- T1 North Shore & Western Line: Emu Plains or Schofields to Berowra or Hornsby via Parramatta & Gordon
- T4 Eastern Suburbs & Illawarra Line: Bondi Junction to Waterfall & Cronulla via Hurstville & Sutherland
- T9 Northern Line: Gordon to Hornsby via Strathfield

Additionally, they operate limited services on the following lines:

- T3 Liverpool & Inner West Line: Liverpool to City Circle via Regents Park and Lidcombe (weekends)
- T7 Olympic Park Line: Shuttle from Lidcombe to Olympic Park (limited)
- T8 Airport & South Line: Macarthur to City Circle via Airport or Sydenham (weekends)

== Incidents ==
=== Wentworthville derailment ===
Driving trailer car D6127 and motor car N5127 were both involved in the Wentworthville train derailment on 27 December 1989, the first major accident involving the Tangara fleet. D6127 was written off, having collided with the platform. N5127 was sent to Dunheved on the Ropes Creek line for training fire fighters, along with S Set car C3866.

=== Vineyard collision ===
On 10 February 1994, set T99 travelling from Richmond towards Blacktown collided with a van at the level crossing at Vineyard. The first 3 cars derailed in a zig-zag format, starting a nearby grassfire.

=== Waterfall derailment ===
Set G7 derailed on 31 January 2003 near Waterfall, killing seven people aboard including the train driver. The driver suffered a sudden heart attack and lost control of the train while the deadman's brake failed to activate as intended. Investigations found the train to be travelling in excess of 117 km/h (73 mph) as it approached the 60 km/h (37 mph) curve where the accident occurred.

=== Unanderra derailment ===
On 24 January 2009 at 2:35 am, set G4 (now T104) was departing from Unanderra towards Wollongong and derailed due to the train passing a signal at danger, and the catch-points derailing the train to avoid a collision with a freight train. The first two cars and the front bogie of the third car derailed and stopped safely 50 metres from the signal. Subsequently because of this incident, G4 was the first G set to undergo conversion to suburban T set T104.

=== Doonside derailment ===
On 15 June 1993, T91 derailed at Doonside due to a tyre from a garbage truck hitting a tree and bouncing into the rail corridor as T91 was approaching. The incident resulted in only minor damage.

=== Vineyard derailment ===
On 10 February 1994, T99 derailed at the level crossing near Vineyard station after colliding with a Toyota Tarago. The occupants of the car survived, but it is believed that the engine block got caught under the trailing bogie of driving trailer car D6274 causing the car to derail. D6274 suffered extensive damage, and was subsequently written off. D6274 has since been replaced by spare car D6286.

=== Concord derailment ===
On 9 June 1998, set T73 and T84 (D6114–N5114–N5113–D6113–D6174–N5174–N5173–D6173) derailed at Concord West, with the train coming off the tracks and rolling onto Queen Street, the closest street to the station area. The driver failed to slow down for a turnout, which caused the derailment. Driving trailer car D6114 was written off due to extensive damage, with spare driving trailer car D6287 subsequently replacing it, while the rest of the cars were repaired and returned to service, with T73 still retaining its target number, and T84 being eventually renumbered T53. Much like the example with N5159 (see below), motor car N5114 also had some of its side panels replaced.

=== Kingsgrove derailment ===
On 6 October 2000, T30 derailed near Kingsgrove station, which involved three carriages landing on their side. It was revealed that the derailment was caused by hot weather which made the tracks buckle. Some panels on the side of the carriages had to be replaced; this is most notably seen on N5159.

=== Homebush derailment ===
On 7 January 2009, T1 was derailed by catchpoints at Homebush station, injuring one passenger, after the train passed a signal at stop. After this derailment, driving trailer car D6106 was taken out of service and stripped for spare parts at UGL Rail's Unipart maintenance facility at Auburn. It was later repaired and put back together, before being re-attached to T1 in 2014. During the time D6106 was in storage, D6148 filled in for it. In addition to the above, on 9 February 2012, T1 was involved in another minor derailment near Hurstville station. The train was derailed by catch points after passing a signal at stop (SPAD). The driver was subsequently suspended from the job.

=== Damage at Edgecliff ===
On 15 January 2014, a metal guard rail speared through the floor of one of the motor cars of T10 near Edgecliff station while paired with T35 on a service bound for Cronulla. It was later revealed that a broken axle led to the guard rail from a concrete slab being lifted, piercing into the vestibule of carriage N5222, narrowly avoiding several passengers.

=== Stuck at Town Hall ===
On 23 August 2019, T50 had one of the top hatches on driving trailer car D6223 come loose and was close to being caught in overhead wires at Town Hall. Power had to be isolated, causing major delays for over 12 hours on almost every line as a result, with the North Shore, Northern and Western Lines being the most heavily affected. There has also been investigation that T50 may have hit an external object prior to entering the City tunnel, as scratches were detected on the affected hatch.

=== Caringbah collision ===
On 9 October 2020, sets T41 and T77 collided with a fallen tree at Caringbah, causing trains to be suspended between Sutherland and Cronulla. The two sets were later towed by 81 class locomotive 8166 to Mortdale Maintenance Depot for repairs.

=== Kembla Grange derailment ===
On 20 October 2021 at 4:09 am, Tangara set T42 derailed near Kembla Grange station on a level crossing. It was caused by a motor vehicle that was stolen and driven up the rail corridor near the railway crossing. Car D6212 fell onto its side and car N5212 also derailed, while cars N5211 and D6211 did not derail and only had minor damage. There were no serious passenger injuries or deaths as a result of this incident, however two passengers, as well as the guard and the driver, were hospitalised to be checked. The driver was badly injured during the rollover of the driver trailer carriage. T sets typically did not operate through Kembla Grange, however they were used on the day of the incident instead of the usual H sets due to industrial action.

== 4D ==
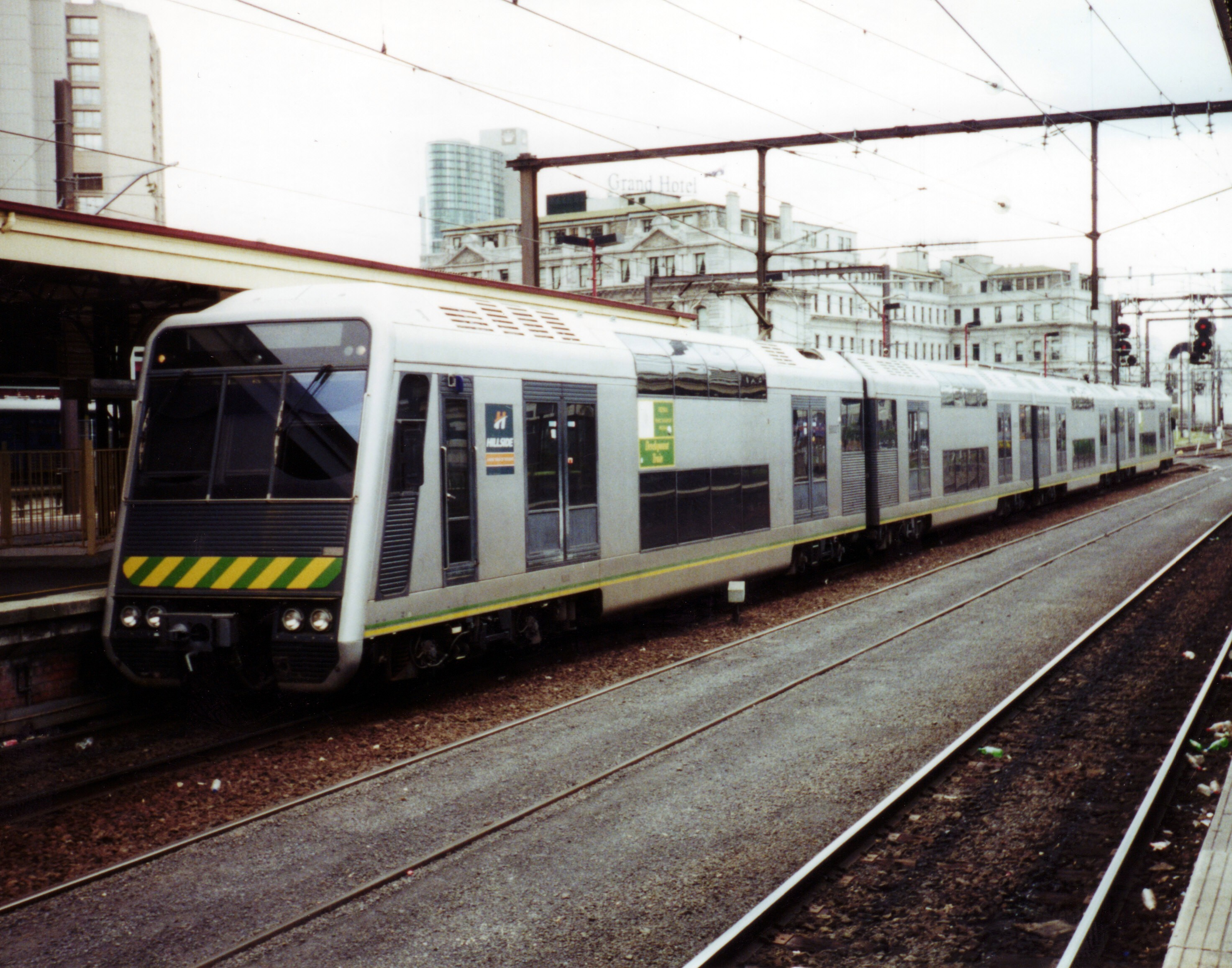
4D at Spencer Street

A train bearing strong resemblance to a Tangara, known as the 4D, was built by A Goninan & Co in 1991 for the Public Transport Corporation. Although outwardly similar to the Tangaras, it was mechanically very different, being built to be compatible with the Comeng trains operated in Melbourne. It was included in the sale of Hillside Trains to Connex Melbourne in August 1999. It was not successful and after spending large periods out of service, being withdrawn in December 2002 and stored at Newport Workshops. The 4D was bought by CityRail for parts and then scrapped in March 2006 by them at Sims Metal, Brooklyn, Victoria. The G sets' cab ends have a design similar to the 4D, with the bottom part being bent inwards.
