= CityRail fleet =

The CityRail fleet now belongs to:

- Sydney Trains fleet
- NSW TrainLink fleet
