= Sydney Trains rolling stock =

The Sydney Trains fleet serves the metropolitan and intercity lines within Sydney, Australia. Most of the rolling stock are double-deck electric multiple units, while some are single-deck diesel multiple units and operate mainly as eight carriage sets, with some operating in four and two.

== Current fleet ==
Sydney Trains fleet
Class	Name	Image	Type	Top speed		Carriages	Entered service	Formation	Routes
Class	Name	Image	Type	km/h	mph	Carriages	Entered service	Formation	Routes
T sets	Tangara		Electric multiple unit	115	71	447	1988–1995	4 cars, 8 cars	Special and rare events only:
M sets	Millennium		Electric multiple unit	130	81	140	2002–2005	4 cars, 8 cars	T2 Leppington & Inner West Line T3 Liverpool & Inner West Line T5 Cumberland Line T6 Lidcombe & Bankstown Line Olympic Park railway line T8 Airport & South Line
H sets	OSCAR		Electric multiple unit	130	81	220	2006–2012	4 cars, 8 cars	T1 North Shore & Western Line T9 Northern Line Central Coast & Newcastle Line South Coast Line
A sets	Waratah		Electric multiple unit	130	81	626	2011–2014	8 cars	T1 North Shore & Western Line T2 Leppington & Inner West Line T3 Liverpool & Inner West Line T5 Cumberland Line Olympic Park railway line T8 Airport & South Line T9 Northern Line
B sets	Waratah		Electric multiple unit	130	81	328	2018–2021	8 cars	T1 North Shore & Western Line T2 Leppington & Inner West Line T3 Liverpool & Inner West Line Olympic Park railway line T8 Airport & South Line T9 Northern Line
D sets	Mariyung		Electric multiple unit	160	99	610	2024–present	4 cars, 6 cars	Blue Mountains Line Central Coast & Newcastle Line South Coast Line
N sets	Endeavour		Diesel multiple unit	145	90	30	1994–1996	2 cars	(to Bathurst) (Kiama–Bomaderry)
J sets	Hunter		Diesel multiple unit	145	90	14	2007–2008	2 cars	Hunter Line

== Former Fleet ==
Sydney Trains former fleet
Class	Image	Type	Service Speed		Carriages	Entered Service	Last Withdrawn	Formation	Network
Class	Image	Type	km/h	mph	Carriages	Entered Service	Last Withdrawn	Formation	Network
V set		Electric multiple unit	115	71	246	1970–1989	2026	4 Cars	Intercity
S set		Electric multiple unit	115	71	509	1972	2019	4 Cars	Suburban
K set		Electric multiple unit	115	71	160	1981–1985	2026	4 Cars	Suburban
C set		Electric multiple unit	115	71	56	1986–1987	2021	4 Cars	Suburban

== History ==
The following lists all rolling stock to have operated under Sydney Trains.

=== S sets ===
==== 1972 Comeng power cars ====
In 1972, the first Comeng-constructed stainless steel double deck power-cars entered service. These cars (C3805–3857) were loosely based on the recently introduced inter-urban cars, the V set. Their stainless-steel bodies were painted the standard "Tuscan red" to match the livery of the existing fleet. Cars C3844–3857 were delivered in the blue and white livery of the Public Transport Commission in the 1970s, and repainted to deep Indian red after 1976, before being paint-stripped to run in their original stainless steel finish in the early 1980s. They were initially marshalled into sets (from S11 onwards) with Tulloch trailers T4841, 4842, and 4845 to 4895, which had their passenger doors modified from manual to power operation. Internally, they had reversible seating with a light-tan upholstery, and a grey and off-white internal livery. Beclawat sliding windows were fitted to the upper and lower decks, with drop windows in the doors. The sliding windows were replaced with Hopper windows in the 1990s and internally they were repainted light grey with blue upholstered seating. These motor cars had tapered ends, which were fitted with destination boards in the 1990s. With the introduction of the Millennium Trains in 2002, several early Comeng power-cars were converted to non-driving trailers, with their pantographs removed, and renumbered T4701–4723. The last of these cars with withdrawn in 2014.

==== 1973 Comeng power and trailer cars ====
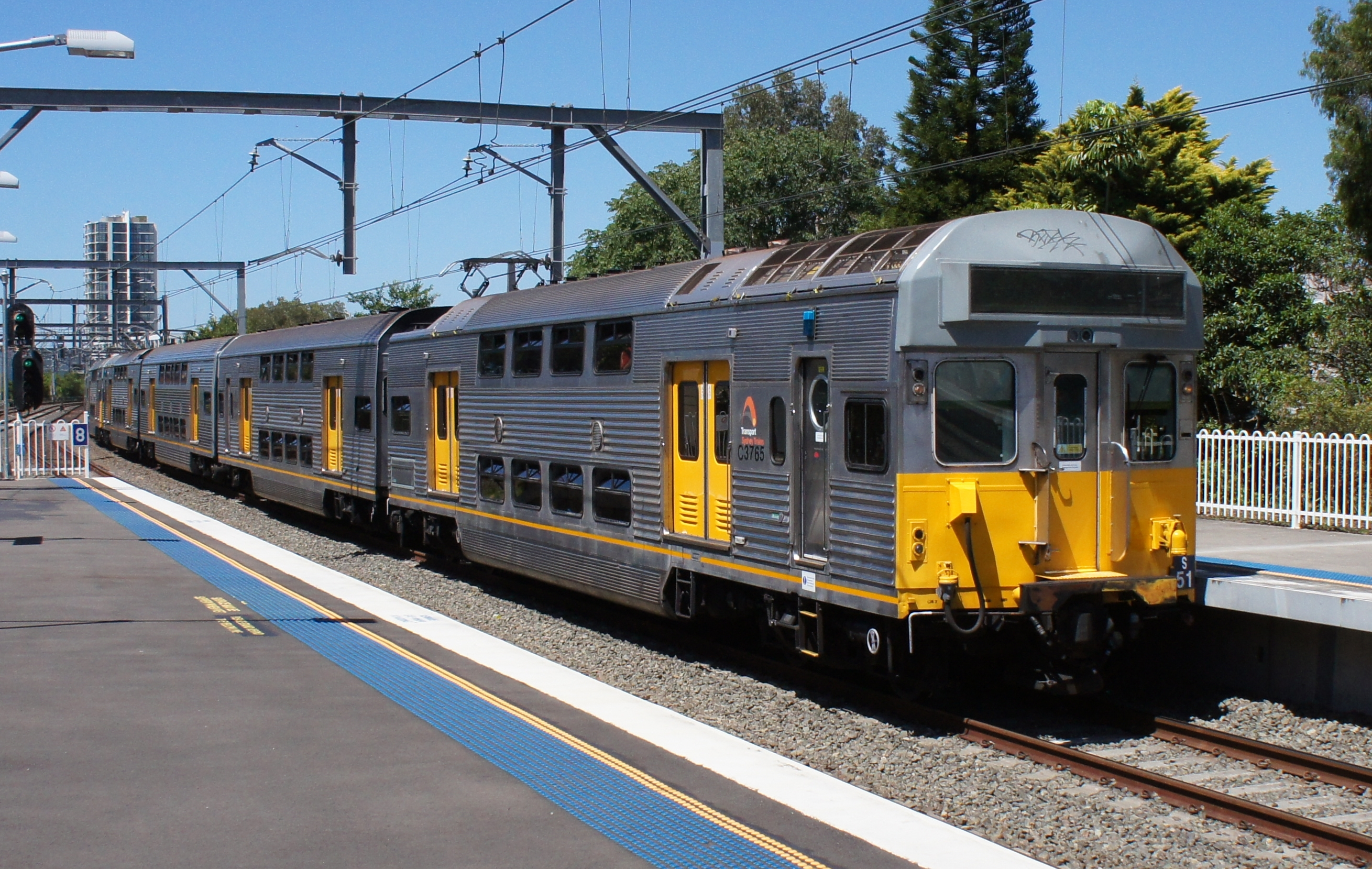
A Comeng-built S Set led by power car C3765

In 1973, additional 54 Comeng power cars C3858–3911, and 56 Comeng trailer cars T4921–4962, were ordered to coincide with the opening of the Eastern suburbs railway line. These trailer cars were the first to be of stainless steel construction, and they had an extra row of seats on the top deck (and are thus distinguished by an extra single window at the centre of the car on both decks). Ten driving trailers D4011–4020 were built with small driver's compartments for 2-car trains. However, they never saw service as driving cars due to Union bans. Subsequently, 25 driving trailer cars D4021–4045 (with large guard's compartments) were also built to be paired with a driving motor car to allow 2-car sets to be operated. Ten driving trailers were diesel hauled on South Coast suburban services, south of Thirroul, prior to electrification. Ten driving trailers, renumbered D4001–4010, were used for two car shuttles in the initial period after the electrification of the Richmond line. These driving trailer cars subsequently had their driving equipment removed and were converted into standard non-driving trailer cars. Extended orders saw the Comeng double-deck fleet expanded to include power-cars C3912–3986 & 3741–3765, trailers T4963–4987 and driving trailers D4046–4095 by 1982. By 1976, one quarter of suburban cars were double deck. All the 1973 cars are now integrated with earlier stock and operate as L, R & S Sets. With the introduction of the Millennium Trains in 2002, several early Comeng power-cars were converted to non-driving trailers, with their pantographs removed, and renumbered T4701–4723. These cars operated until 2019.

==== 1978 Goninan cars ====
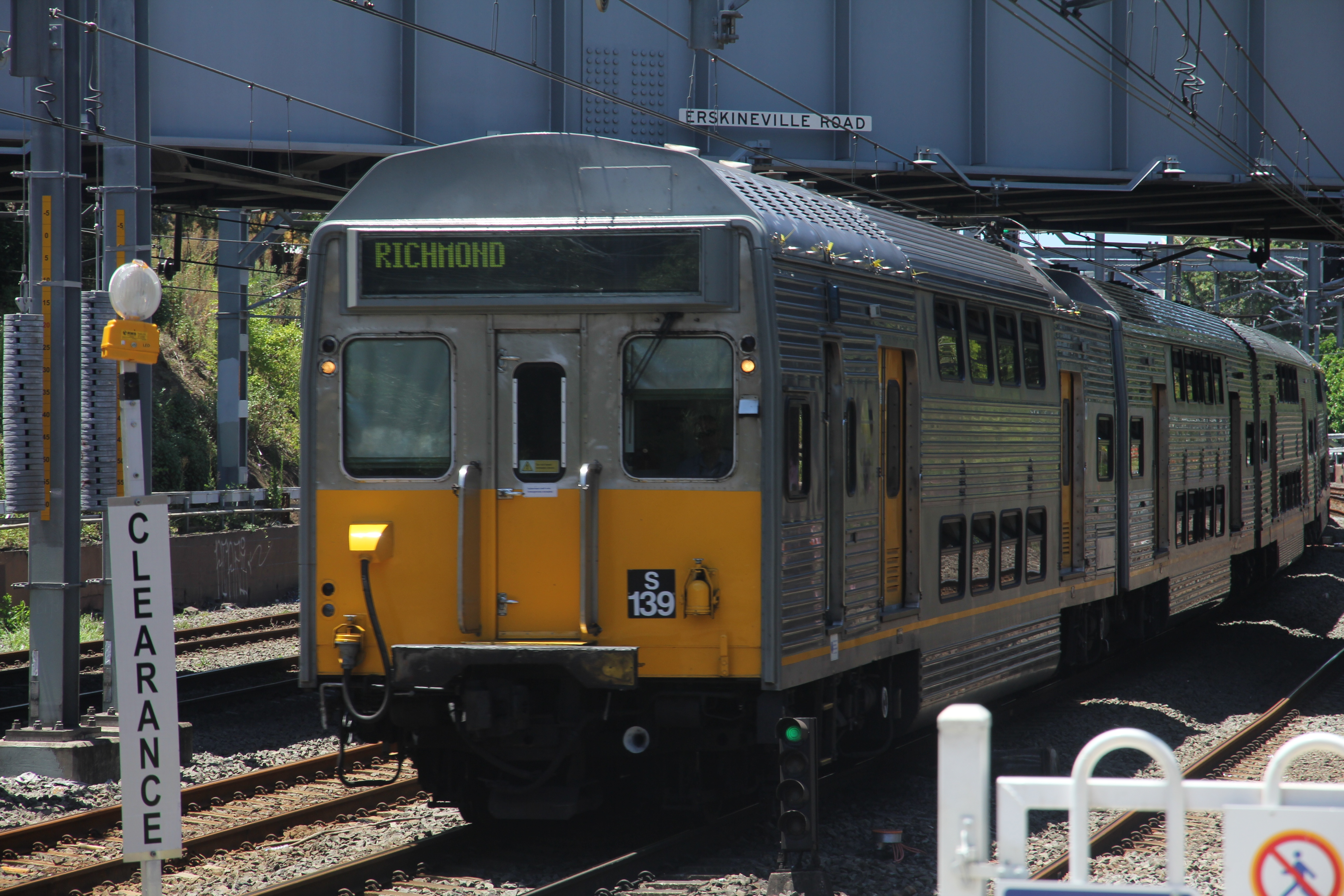
A Goninan & Co-built S set

In the 1970s, A Goninan & Co in Newcastle entered the passenger car construction market building 80 power cars C3001–3080 and 70 trailer cars T4101–4170. Unlike the Comeng cars, the power cars had a flat front end and Pullman Standard fluting, and the upper deck passenger windows were set significantly lower than the earlier Comeng cars reducing passenger sight lines (a source of complaint from passengers). When the Eastern Suburbs Railway was opened in 1979, only stainless-steel Comeng or Goninan double deck cars were meant to operate on this line, but the painted Tulloch double-deck trailers were also used. In 1981, a brand new four-car Goninan set conveyed Queen Elizabeth II from Bankstown (which was declared a City by the Queen) to Martin Place. For this occasion the train was specially fitted out with carpets and other refinements. The set was targeted "R1" for the occasion. These cars continued to operate into 2019 as L, R and S sets. They were the last non-air conditioned passenger trains in service under Sydney Trains.

==== Retirement ====
Two thirds of pre-1981 non-air conditioned S set rolling stock were withdrawn from service with the roll-out of 626 new A set carriages (78 sets) from 2011 to June 2014. The final sets were scheduled to be withdrawn from service by 2015 but some sets were retained for the South West Rail Link since no newer rolling stock or additional A sets had been ordered. In December 2016, the NSW Government introduced 192 new B sets. These replaced all remaining non-airconditioned S set trains by the end of June 2019.

=== 1986 Goninan cars (C sets) ===
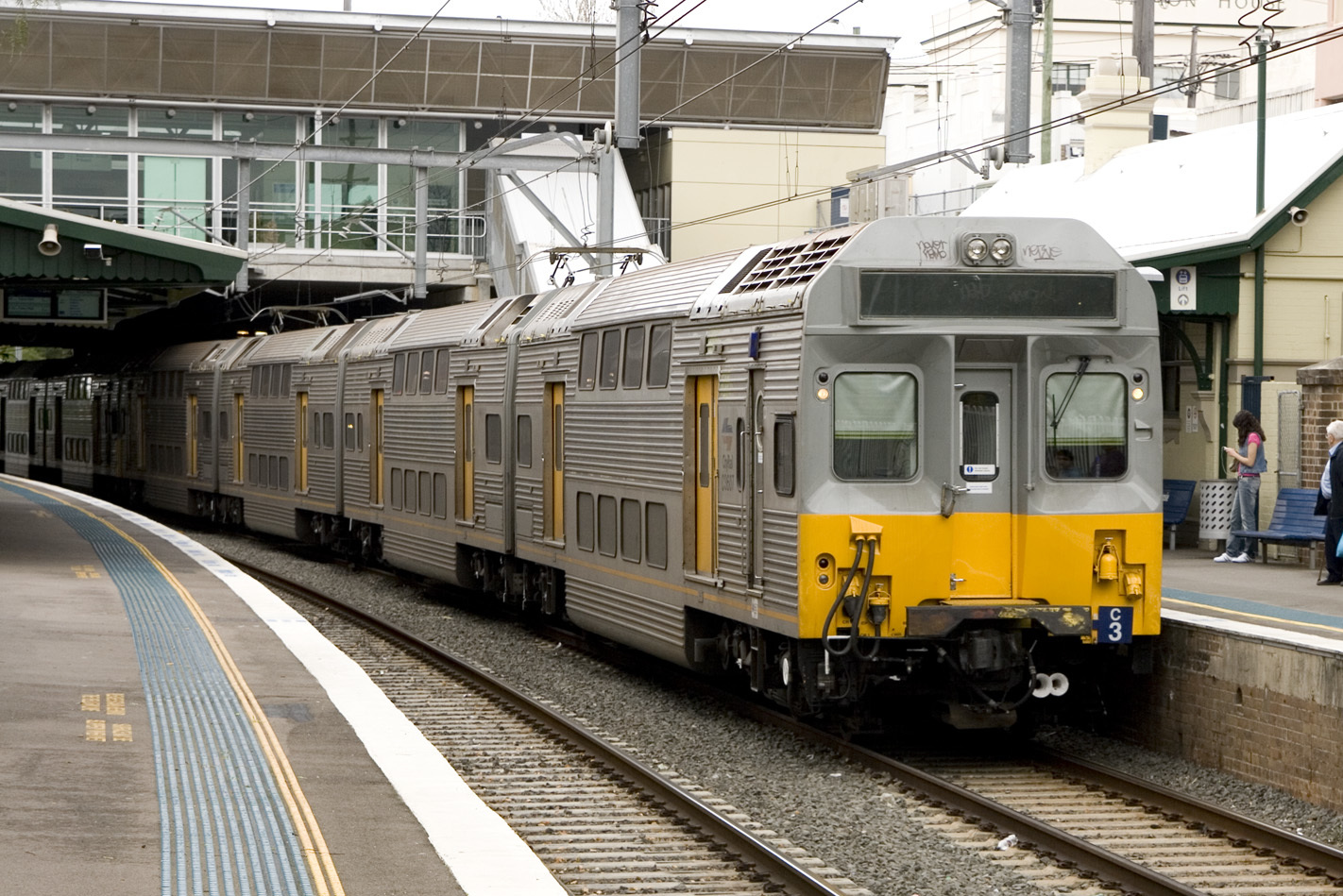
A C set at Campsie railway station

In 1986, a new generation of advanced suburban passenger train was being considered by the State Rail Authority. There was a delay in the construction of these trains, and 56 interim stainless steel air conditioned cars, C3581–3608 and T4247–4274, were built by Goninan, known as the 'Chopper Cars' for their chopper control. These cars trialled several features of the next generation cars, such as fixed seating, door chimes and passenger address systems. They were originally fitted with a push-button feature, to enable passengers to open the doors manually, but this feature was short-lived. They retained the flat ends of the previous Goninan cars, but with the addition of a fibreglass moulded end piece which was originally white with orange and red stripes (the 'candy' State Rail livery). These ends were later painted grey with a lower yellow section which they retain to this day, and internally the standard grey livery and blue seat upholstery was applied. These cars were initially branded as a continuation of the K Sets, but were incompatible due to the camshaft controls fitted to the existing fleet. Often, the sets would 'jerk' while accelerating when coupled together. These cars were later rebranded as C sets, to differentiate them from K Sets.

They continued to operate until the second batch of B sets started entering service from late 2020. The last train was withdrawn on 26 February 2021, after operating its last revenue run on 90-W from the city to Liverpool via Bankstown. A farewell tour took place on 6 March, organised by the Sydney Electric Train Society (SETS). The train operated up the Blue Mountains to Mount Victoria and made a trip to both Hornsby and Fairfield. Initially, no sets were to be preserved due to the small fleet, however, SETS will preserve one 4-car set as of July 2021. This set has been confirmed to be formed of cars C3584, T4266 (both from set C5), T4274 and C3608 (both from set C9). C3608 and T4274 are significant for being the final stainless steel power and trailer cars respectively built for the Sydney network.

==== V set (1970–1989) ====
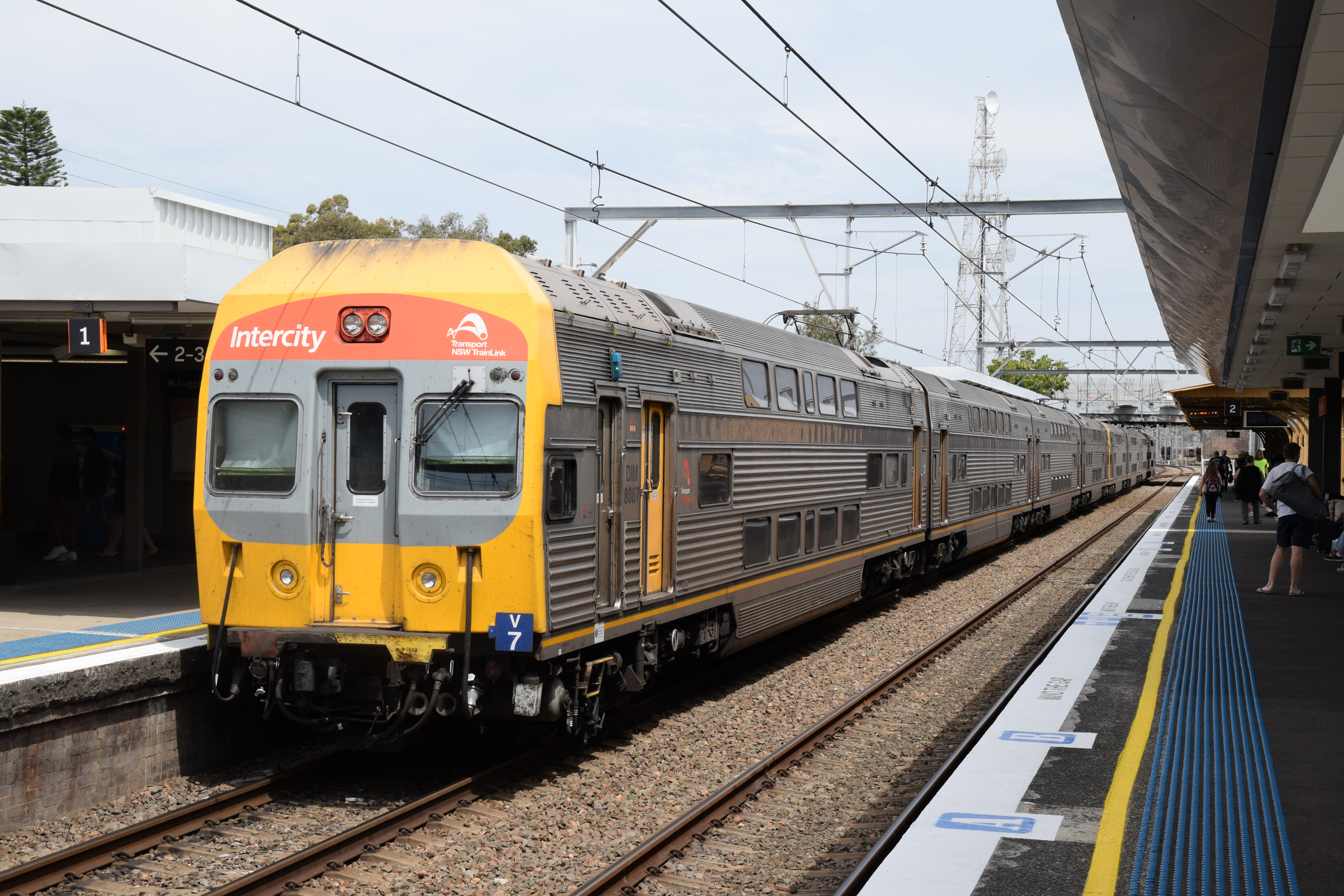
V set

V sets formed the backbone of the interurban network's services. They were manufactured by Comeng and were introduced between 1970 and 1989. They used to run in four or eight car configurations containing toilets on the South Coast line until 2012, the Central Coast & Newcastle Line until 2025 and the Blue Mountains Line to Lithgow until their official retirement in January 2026.

==== K sets ====
In 1981, Goninan built the first air-conditioned cars for the Sydney suburban network. Until then, Sydney had lagged somewhat behind other cities that had commenced the introduction of air-conditioned stock. In order to fit the air-conditioning equipment into the motor cars, the pantographs were moved to the trailers, effectively meaning that a motor car must remain semi-permanently coupled to a trailer car. Four driving trailer cars D4096–4099 were also ordered, allowing 2-car sets to be operated with power cars C3501–3504. The first 8-car set (R1) was delivered with air-conditioning, followed by 90 forced ventilation cars C3505–3549 & T4171–4215, during the delivery process for this order, C3550 and T4216 were delivered, fully fitted with air-conditioning.

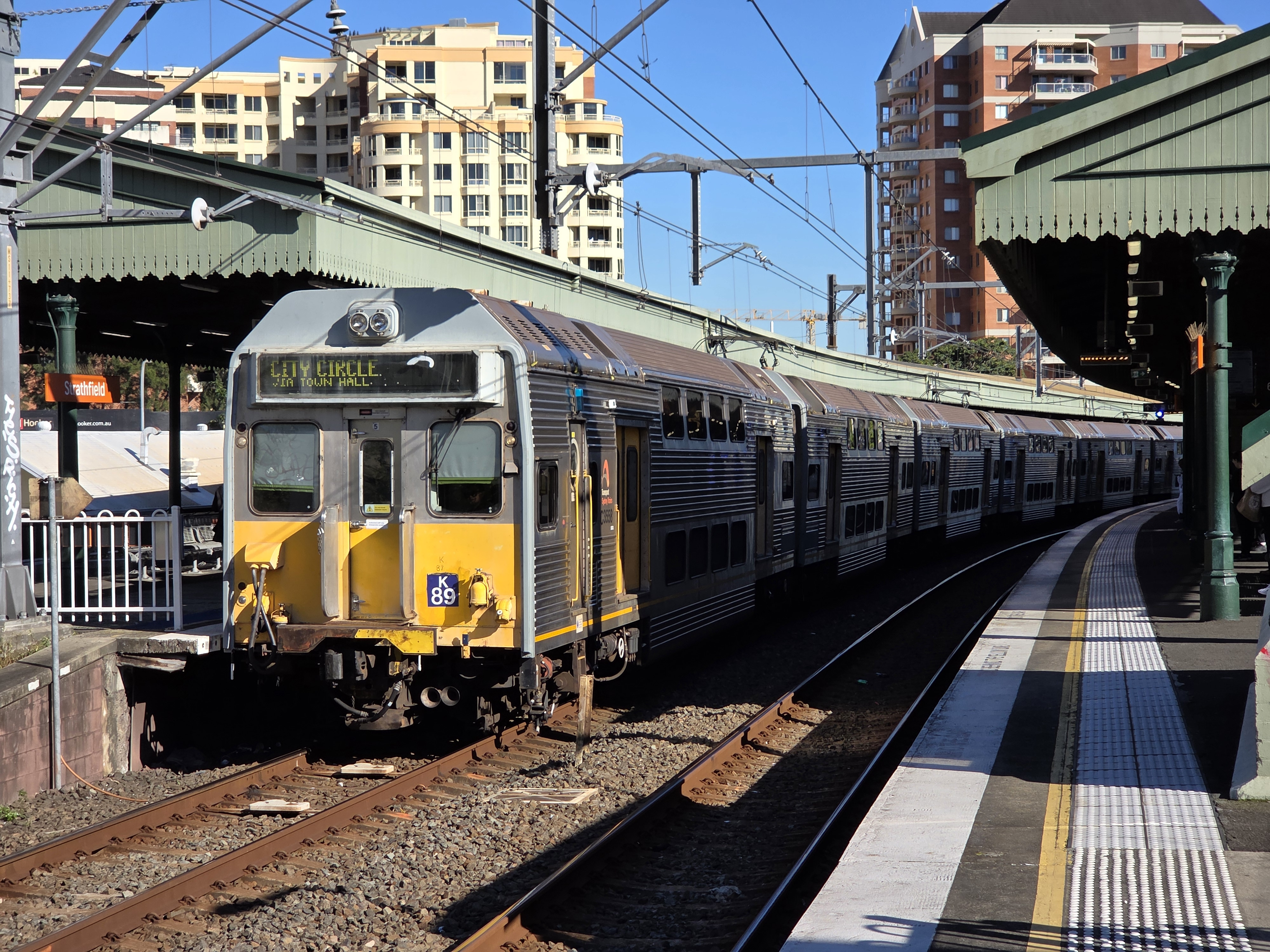
K set

Following this, the next order, numbered from C3551 and T4217, were also fitted with forced-air ventilation, and were the first to be fitted with air-conditioning. The first 100 cars had their upper deck windows at the unpopular lower height of the earlier Goninan cars, the final 60 were modified and these final 60 were distinguished by their front end being painted into the 'candy' white, orange and red State Rail livery of the time. The final batch (C3551–3580 & T4217–4246) also featured bright yellow internal walls. The forced ventilation cars were later retrofitted with air-conditioning, and the Beclawat sliding windows replaced by fixed panes in the late 1990s. Also at this time, the standard light grey internal livery was adopted, and the seats were replaced with blue upholstery. 160 of these cars were delivered until 1985, and continue to operate until their retirement in 2026 as K sets.

== Current passenger rolling stock ==
=== Suburban fleet ===
==== T sets (Tangaras) ====
In 1988, the T sets were introduced as "third generation" rolling stock, also known as the Tangara trains – an aboriginal word meaning "to go". This train marked a radical departure from the previous double deck car design both in appearance and technically. The T sets were the last publicly funded electric rolling stock built for CityRail – all future electric trains were built and operated under public–private partnership agreements. A total of 450 T set cars were introduced between 1988 and 1994, allowing the withdrawal of the remaining Standard suburban carriages and Tulloch suburban carriages by 1992.

Eighty G set cars featuring toilets, high-backed reversible seating and passenger door opening controls were built between 1994 and 1996. These generally operated on outer-suburban runs, typically to Wollongong, Springwood and Gosford, though they also sometimes operated in suburban service. These outer-suburban sets allowed the retirement of the last remaining single-deck U sets in 1996. One set, G7, was experimentally fitted with dual-voltage A/C traction. This set was extensively damaged in the Waterfall rail accident in January 2003 and scrapped after completion of the coronial inquiry into the accident.

In 2010, a refurbishment program began for all Tangaras, which were by then nearly 20 years old and showing signs of wear and tear. This work involved reupholstered seats, new flooring and handrails, relocated end saloon partitions and a complete internal repaint. Inter-car doors and handrails are repainted yellow, and the interiors share common fittings with the Millennium and OSCAR cars. The former outer-suburban G sets have been retargeted as T sets from T101 onwards and the cars recoded from OD, ON and ONL to the suburban D & N codings, retaining the same 58xx and 68xx number series. The former ONL cars have had their toilet and water cooler removed and replaced with longitudinal seating, but without the luggage racks found elsewhere in these cars.

==== M sets (Millenniums) ====
From 2002, 140 "fourth generation" carriages were introduced, known as Millennium trains or M sets. These trains allowed the withdrawal of the Tulloch double deck trailer carriages. These were the first passenger trains in NSW to introduce automatic passenger information displays and announcements. The design of the M sets formed the basis for the design of H sets and A sets. These trains are maintained by Downer Rail at the Auburn Maintenance Centre.

While the Millennium trains are suitable for division into four-car sets, they are normally kept coupled as eight-cars sets at all times.

==== A & B sets (Waratahs) ====
The A sets (also known as the Waratah trains) are a double-decker, air-conditioned train based on the Millennium train, the order being for 78 sets of eight cars per train. The body shells were constructed in China and completed at Newcastle, New South Wales by a joint venture between the NSW Government, Downer Rail, and other companies under a public–private partnership, with delivery between 2011 and 2014 to replace the now withdrawn 6–8 car R & S Set trains. The first set went into regular service on 1 July 2011 on the Macarthur–East Hills–Airport line with the last set delivered by mid-2014.

The New South Wales Government announced on 1 December 2016 that 24 new suburban trains had been ordered. Known as the Sydney Growth Trains during development, the trains are officially classified as B sets and are a lightly updated version of the similar A sets. The $1.7 billion contract was awarded to Downer EDI. CRRC Changchun Railway Vehicles manufactured the bodies of the trains before delivering them to Downer EDI, to undergo final assembly. More than 90 percent of the design is shared with the original A sets. The first B set was unveiled in Auburn in March 2018. After undergoing months of testing, Set B2 was the first to enter revenue service on 7 September 2018. The B sets replaced the remaining S sets by the end of June 2019. In February 2019, a further 17 B sets were ordered.

=== Interurban and outer suburban fleet ===
The network's interurban services are designed with extra facilities (such as armrests and on-board toilets) to cater for longer distance journeys connecting Sydney with regional centres. All interurban trains are air-conditioned. Whilst previously operated by NSW TrainLink, in July 2024, interurban services were transferred to the responsibility of Sydney Trains.

==== Electric ====
===== H set (OSCAR) (2006–2012) =====
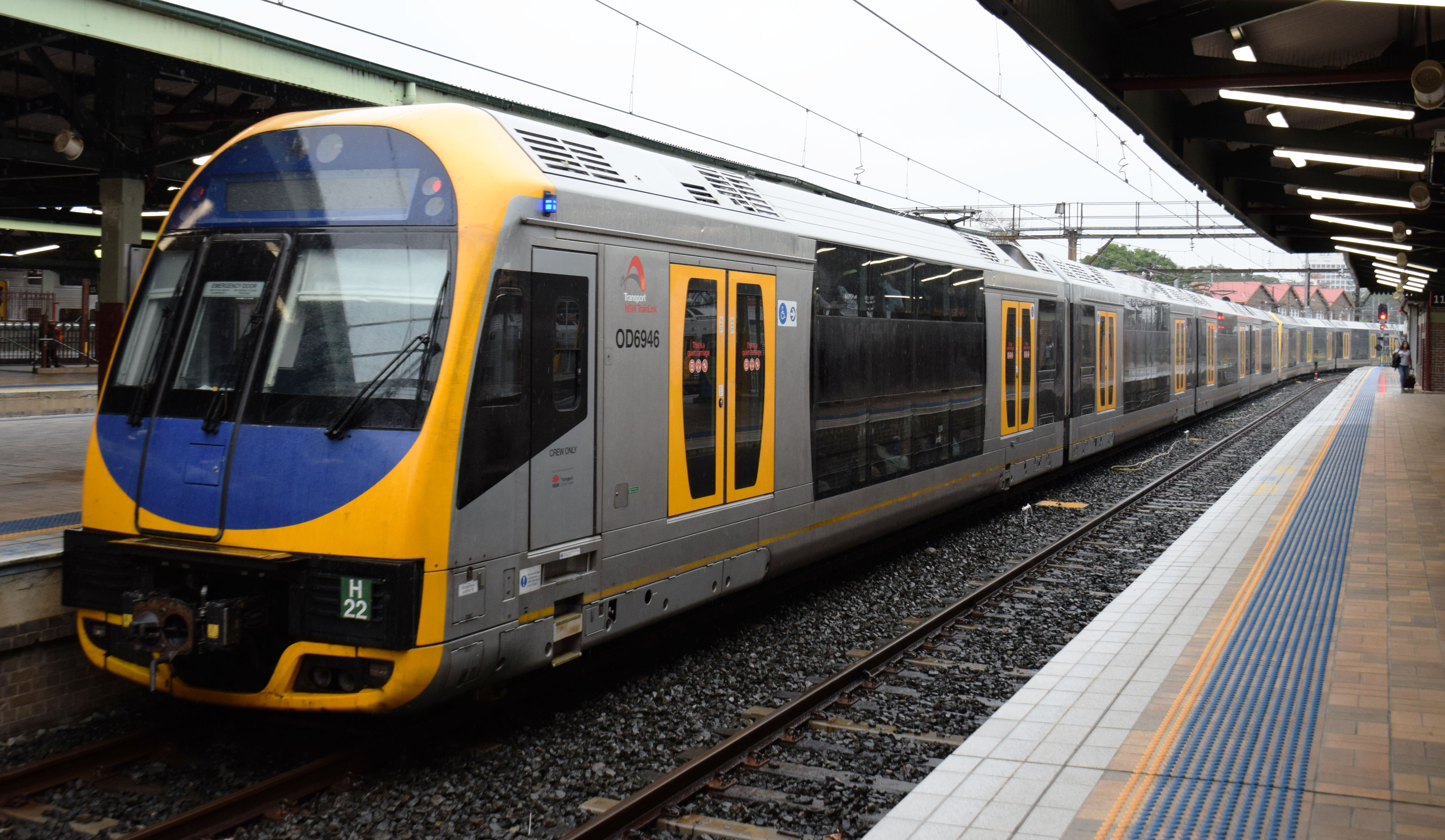
H set

H sets (nicknamed OSCARs, for Outer Suburban CARs) were introduced from 2006 and operate as 4 or 8 car sets on the South Coast Line, and were formerly in operation on the Blue Mountains Line and Central Coast & Newcastle Line. The OSCARs were initially ordered to replace the G set Tangaras on outer suburban runs, however in addition to this they have also been used to replace some of the older interurban V sets which have been retired. They contain toilets and feature suburban style 3×2 seating and perform some suburban only work in addition to their main outer suburban duties. They are currently being replaced with D sets (see below) and being converted for suburban duties on Sydney's T1 and T9 lines.

===== D sets (Mariyung) (2024–) =====
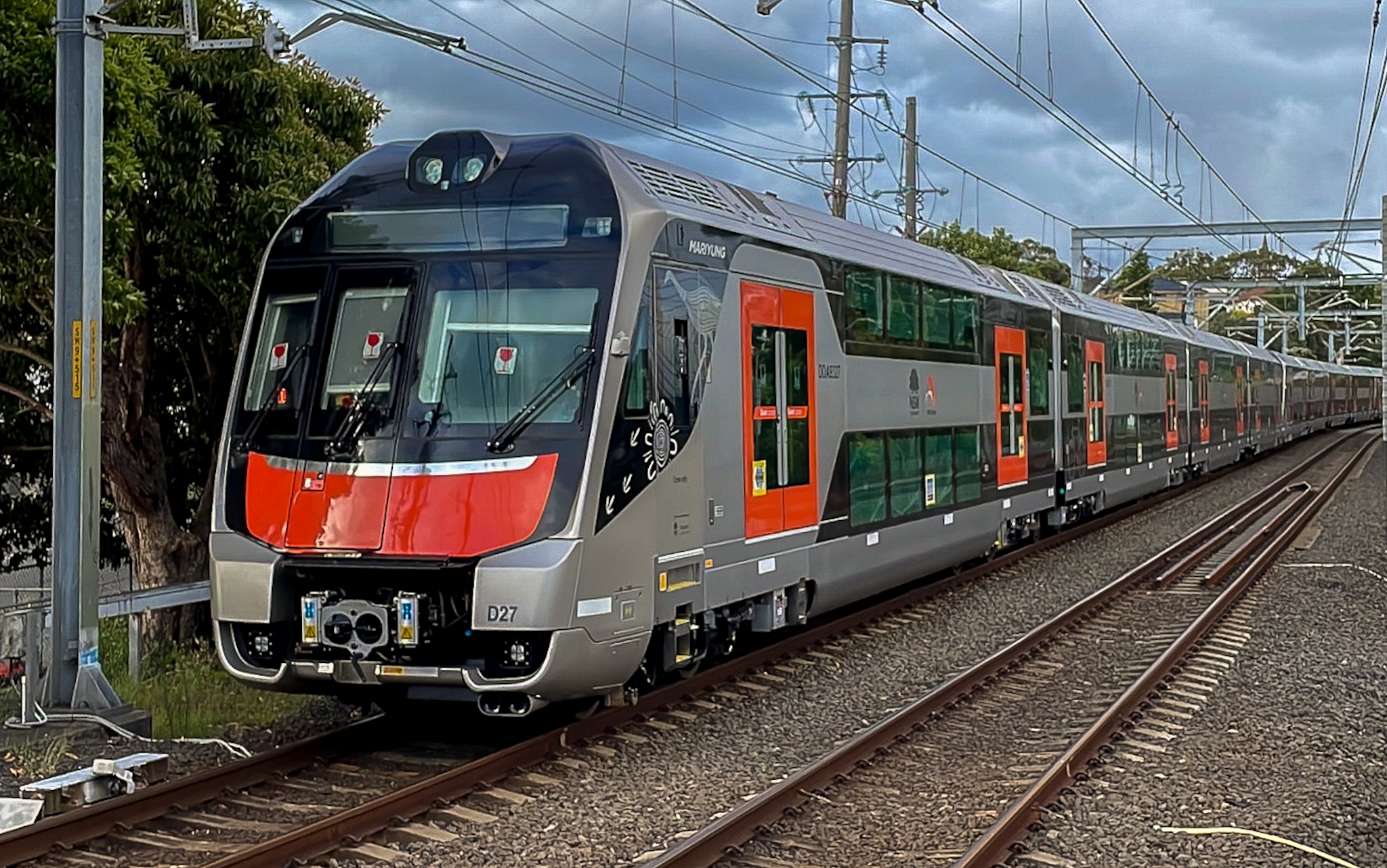
A D set on its delivery transfer

D sets (also called the Mariyung trains, previously the New Intercity Fleet) are currently being introduced since they started operating in 2024. They will be operating on the Blue Mountains Line, Central Coast & Newcastle Line and South Coast Line, intended to replace V and H sets currently running on these lines, with the H sets re-allocated to suburban services and all V sets withdrawn.

Produced in South Korea by RailConnect, a joint venture of Hyundai Rotem, Mitsubishi Electric and UGL Rail, the first train was delivered in 2019, but the trains are expected to enter service in 2024 due to a safety-related dispute between the rail union and the government. The D sets feature non-reversible 2x2 seating (unlike other sets), phone charging, accessible toilets and dedicated spaces for luggage, prams, bicycles and wheelchairs.

==== Diesel ====
The network's diesel multiple units are run on the Southern Highlands Line, the far reaches of the South Coast Line (between Kiama and Bomaderry), services on the Blue Mountains Line that extend to Bathurst, and the regional Hunter Line.

===== Endeavour railcar (1994) =====
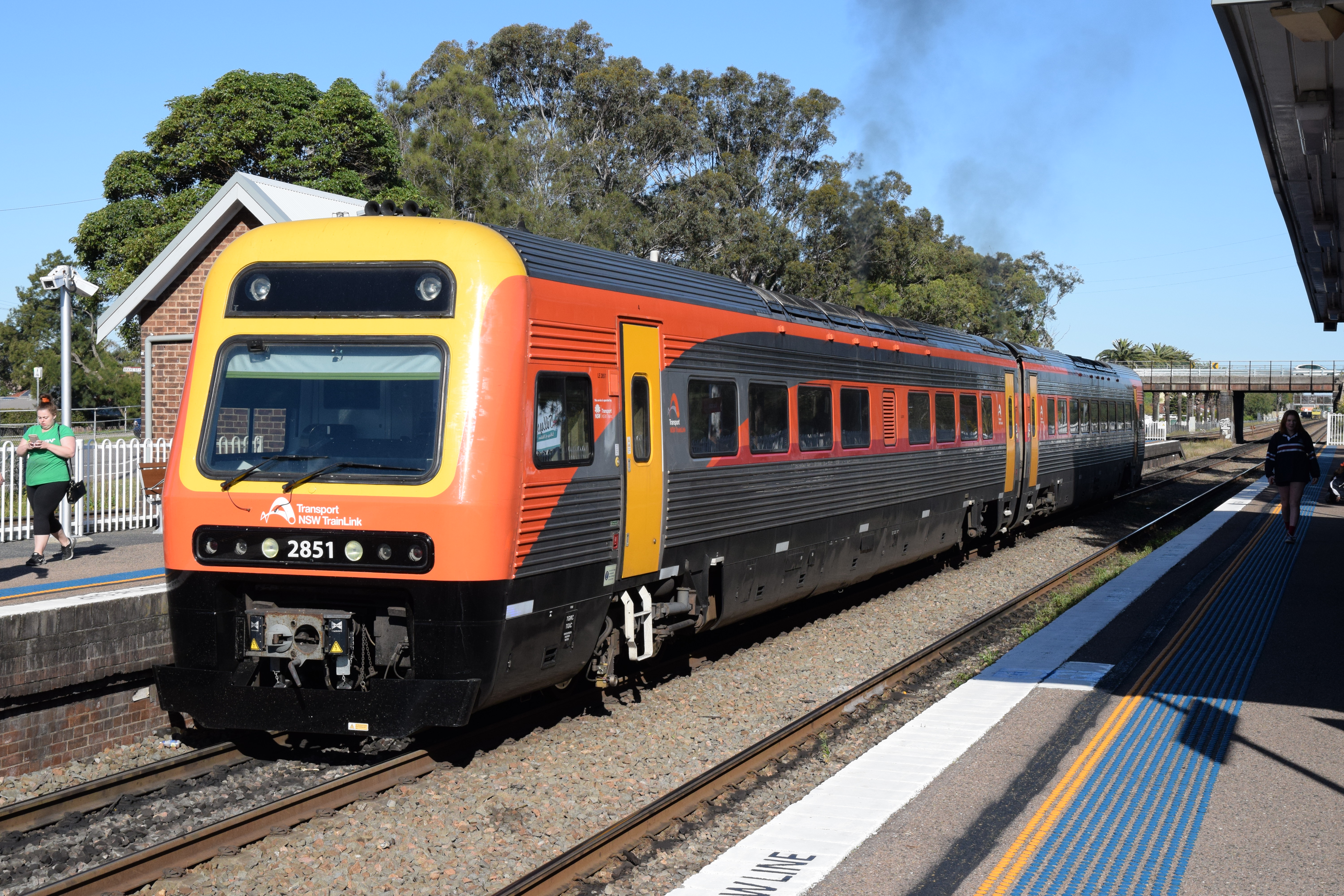
Endeavour railcar

Endeavour railcars were introduced in 1994. The 28 carriages were manufactured by Adtranz. They serve all lines on which diesel trains operate. The New South Wales Xplorer is a long distance configuration of the same basic design.

===== Hunter railcar (2006–2007) =====
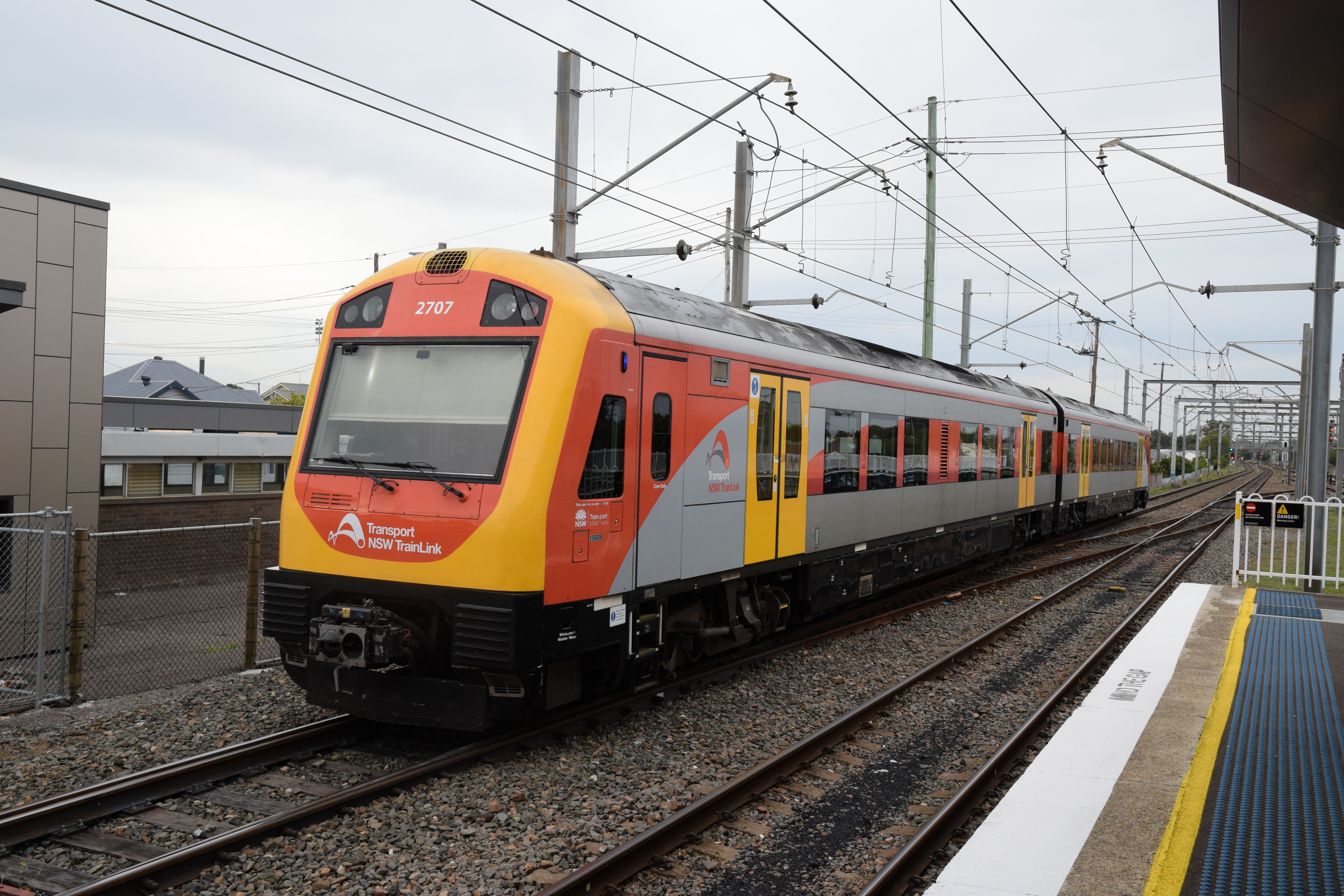
Hunter railcar

Hunter railcars were the newest members of the NSW TrainLink's diesel fleet, serving the Hunter line only. Introduced between 22 November 2006 and 10 September 2007, they replaced the old 620/720 railcars. Features of the series of the 7 2-car trains include air-conditioning, security cameras, on-board passenger information displays and digital voice announcements.

== Maintenance Depots ==
Sydney Trains' electric trains are based at maintenance depots. The colour of target plate at the front of each train shows the depot the train was originally based at. Over the years, many trains have been transferred between depots without changing their target plate colour, so the colours no longer have much meaning.

=== Mortdale Maintenance Depot (Red) ===
The following trains are maintained at Mortdale Maintenance Depot:

- T sets on Sector 1 (T4 Eastern Suburbs & Illawarra services and South Coast Line local services) (Note: Some T sets may carry black target plates, as they are regularly swapped between Mortdale and Hornsby)
- H sets on South Coast Line services (Note: M and H sets carry green target plates, as they were originally based at Eveleigh)

The out stabling and depot points for Sector 1 include Cronulla, Waterfall and Bondi Junction.

=== Flemington Maintenance Depot (Blue) ===
The following trains are maintained at Flemington Maintenance Depot:

- K sets on Sector 2 (T2 Leppington & Inner West, T3 Liverpool & Inner West and T8 Airport & South services) (Note: Most K sets carry black target plates as they were originally based at Hornsby)

The out stabling and depot points for Sector 2 include Macdonaldtown, Campbelltown, Liverpool and Leppington.

=== Hornsby Maintenance Depot (Black) ===
The following trains are maintained at Hornsby Maintenance Depot:

- T sets on Sector 3 (T9 Northern and T1 North Shore & Western services) and T7 Olympic Park special event services (Note: Some T sets may carry red target plates, as they are regularly swapped between Hornsby and Mortdale)
- H sets on Central Coast & Newcastle Line services

The out stabling and depot points for Sector 3 include Penrith, Blacktown, Richmond, North Sydney and Hornsby.

=== Eveleigh Maintenance Depot (Green) ===
No trains are currently being maintained at Eveleigh, however the Mariyung D sets are temporarily based here while they undergo acceptance testing.

=== Kangy Angy Maintenance Centre ===
Kangy Angy Maintenance Centre was built to maintain the Mariyung D sets, after opening in 2021 on the Central Coast & Newcastle Line.

=== Auburn Heavy Maintenance Centre (Formerly Auburn MainTrain) ===
Sydney Trains carry out maintenance to the various types of sets they maintain at the depot to which the train concerned is allocated but major work may be done at Auburn Maintenance Centre.

=== Auburn Maintenance Centre (stickers only) ===
The following trains are maintained at Auburn Maintenance Centre by Downer Rail:

- A sets on Sectors 2 and 3 (all Sydney Trains suburban services except T4 Eastern Suburbs & Illawarra services)
- B sets on Sectors 2 and 3 (all Sydney Trains suburban services except T4 Eastern Suburbs & Illawarra services)
- M sets on Sector 2 (T2 Leppington & Inner West, T3 Liverpool & Inner West, T5 Cumberland, T7 Olympic Park and T8 Airport & South services)

== See also ==
- Rail rolling stock in New South Wales
- NSW TrainLink rolling stock
