= NSW TrainLink rolling stock =

Australian state train operations

The NSW TrainLink fleet of trains serves the areas outside Sydney, Australia, mainly regional and interstate lines. The NSW TrainLink fleet consists of diesel traction, with the oldest of the fleet being the XPTs and the newest being the forthcoming R sets. The operations previously included interurban and outer suburban services in its fleet until July 2024, with the services now operated by Sydney Trains rolling stock.

== Fleet ==
All of the regional and interstate fleet is diesel powered and are single deck trains.

=== Xplorer ===
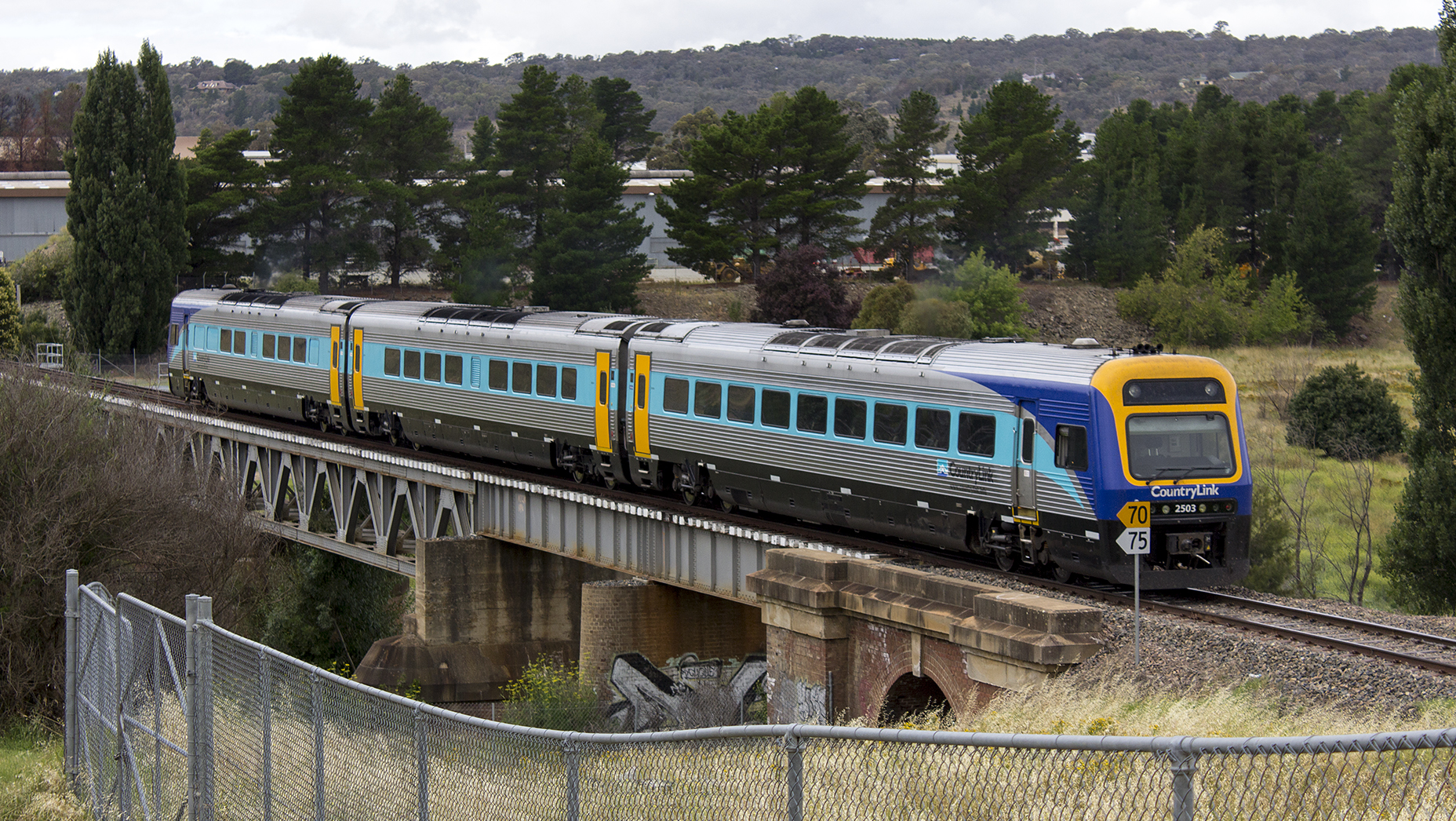
Xplorer, 2012

The Xplorers are a class of regional train built between 1993 and 1995. They were originally built to run the Northern Tablelands Express, but later entered services to Canberra, Griffith and Broken Hill. They have a 2x2 seating configuration, with a buffet, toilets and overhead luggage racks on board.

=== XPT ===
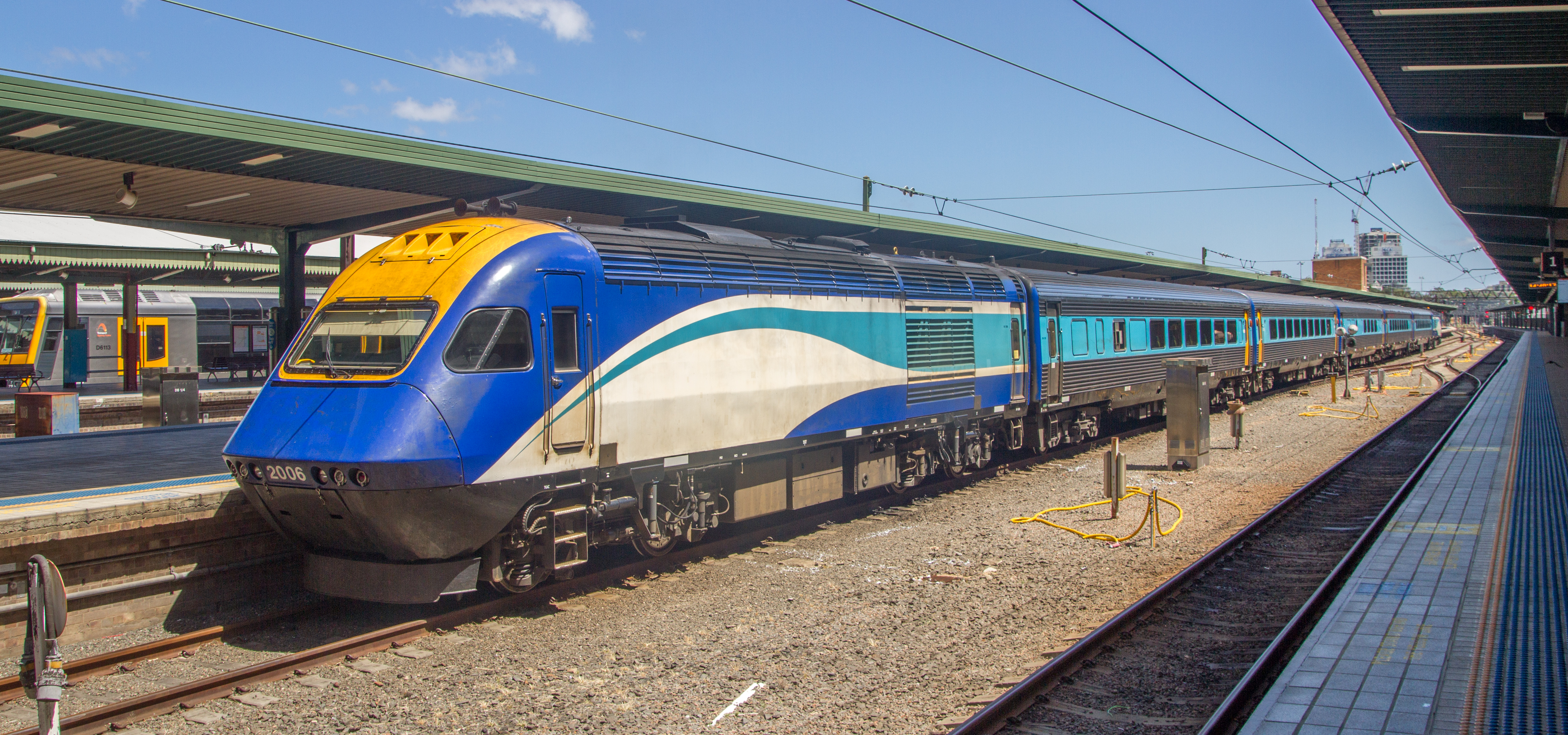
XPT, 2017

The XPTs are a class of diesel-powered trains built between 1981 and 1994. They operate regional and interstate services to Brisbane, Dubbo, Melbourne, Grafton and Casino. These trains are hauled by two diesel power cars in a push-pull configuration. They have a buffet, a 2x2 seating configuration, toilets and luggage racks, as well as sleeper cars for long-distance travels.

=== R set ===
The R sets are a class of electro-diesel multiple units (EDMU) manufactured by CAF as part of the CAF Civity family in 2024. They will replace the XPTs, Xplorers and some Endeavour railcars. As of May 2026, the trains were under testing on the rail network and a firm date for their introduction to service had not been set.

== Maintenance depots ==
XPTs are maintained at the XPT Service Centre just south of Sydenham station. The Xplorers are maintained at the Xplorer Maintenance Centre south of Macdonaldtown. The future R set trains will be maintained at Mindyarra Maintenance Centre in Dubbo.

== See also ==
- Rail rolling stock in New South Wales
- Sydney Trains rolling stock
