= New South Wales S set =

Retired class of electric multiple unit train

S sets
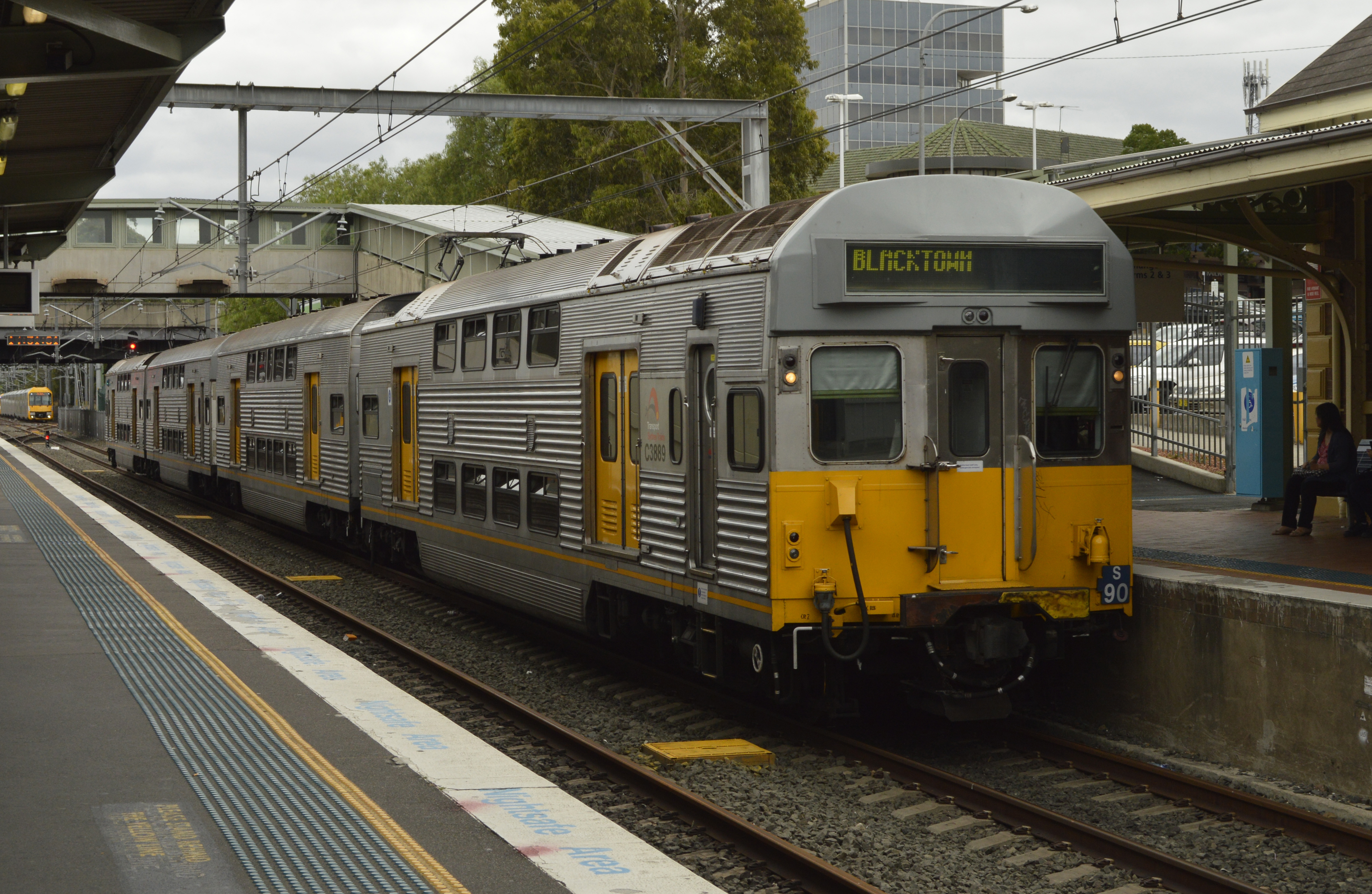
- Set S90 at Liverpool station in February 2014

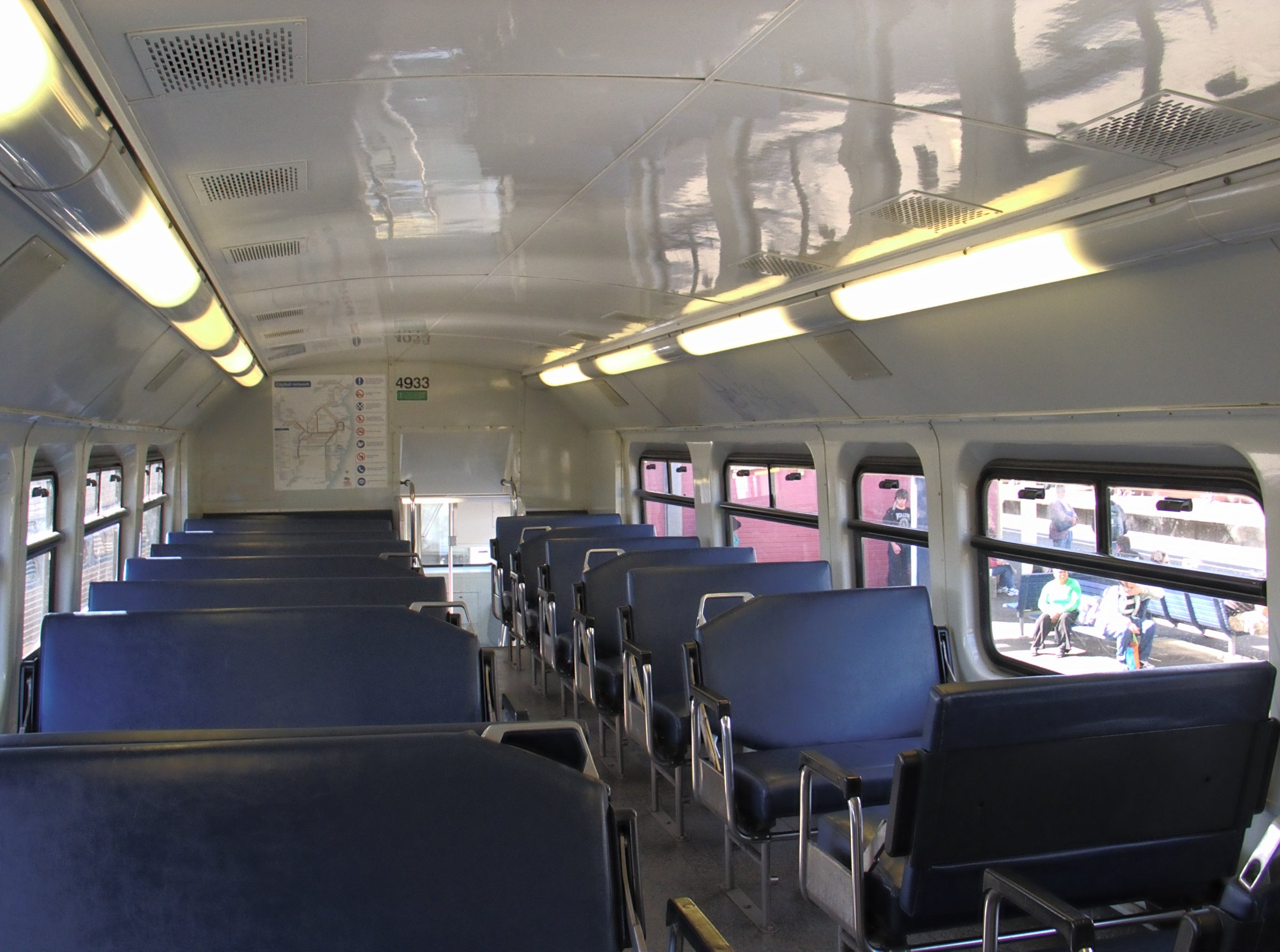
- Upper deck interior
- Stock type: Electric Multiple Unit
- In service: 1972–2019
- Manufacturers: Commonwealth Engineering (359); A Goninan & Co (150)
- Built at: Granville (Comeng); Broadmeadow (Goninan)
- Constructed: 1972–1980
- Entered service: May 1972
- Refurbished: 1990s
- Scrapped: 2011–2015, 2018–2020, 2024
- Number built: 509 carriages
- Number preserved: 16 carriages (as of 2024)
- Number scrapped: 493 carriages
- Predecessor: Wooden motor carriages
- Successor: A and B sets (A1-A3-A78-A80 & B1-B24)
- Formation: 2-car or 3-car sets (L-set); 6-car sets (R-set); 4-car sets (S-set)
- Fleet numbers: C3001–C3080, C3741–C3765, C3805–C3986; D4011–D4095; T4101–T4170, T4921–T4987
- Capacity: Comeng: 484 (112 in control motors, 130 in trailer cars); Goninan: 486 (113 in control motors, 130 in trailer cars)
- Operators: Public Transport Commission; State Rail Authority; CityRail; Sydney Trains
- Depot: Flemington
- Lines served: Until 2015: all Sydney Suburban lines Until retirement: Inner West & Leppington; Bankstown; Carlingford; Olympic Park; Airport & South

Specifications
- Car body construction: Stainless steel
- Car length: 20.22 m (66 ft 4 in)
- Width: Comeng: 3,077 mm (10 ft 1.1 in); Goninan: 3,036 mm (9 ft 11.5 in)
- Height: Comeng: 4,382 mm (14 ft 4.5 in); Goninan: 4,368 mm (14 ft 4.0 in)
- Maximum speed: 115 km/h (71 mph)
- Weight: Comeng control motors: 47 t (46 long tons; 52 short tons); Goninan control motors: 45 t (44 long tons; 50 short tons); Trailers: 34 t (33 long tons; 37 short tons)
- Traction system: Mitsubishi camshaft resistance control
- Traction motors: 4 × Mitsubishi 150 kW (200 hp) series wound DC motor
- Power output: 600 kW (800 hp)
- Transmission: 5.73:1 (86:15) gear ratio
- Electric systems: 1,500 V DC (nominal) from overhead catenary
- Current collection: Pantograph
- UIC classification: Bo′Bo′ (control motors); 2′2′ (trailers)
- Track gauge: 1,435 mm (4 ft 8 1/2 in) standard gauge

The S sets are a type of double-decker electric multiple units (EMU) that formerly operated on Sydney's suburban rail network in New South Wales, Australia from 1972 up until 2019. Originally entering service under the Public Transport Commission, the sets also operated under the State Rail Authority, CityRail and Sydney Trains in later years.

The S sets were originally designated into three classes, two-car L sets (originally T sets), four-car S sets, and six-car R sets. Some received other designations when they were employed on local services on the South Coast and around Newcastle, becoming two-car PK sets and three-car NC sets respectively.

Prior to their retirement, the S sets were the last class in the Sydney Trains fleet to not be air-conditioned, earning them the nicknames "tin cans" and "sweat sets".

They were also nicknamed "Ridgys" because of their fluted ("ridged") stainless steel panelling; they shared this nickname with similar looking K sets and C sets. Their stainless steel appearance is shared with the intercity V sets and U sets. All remaining sets were withdrawn from service in June 2019.

== Delivery ==
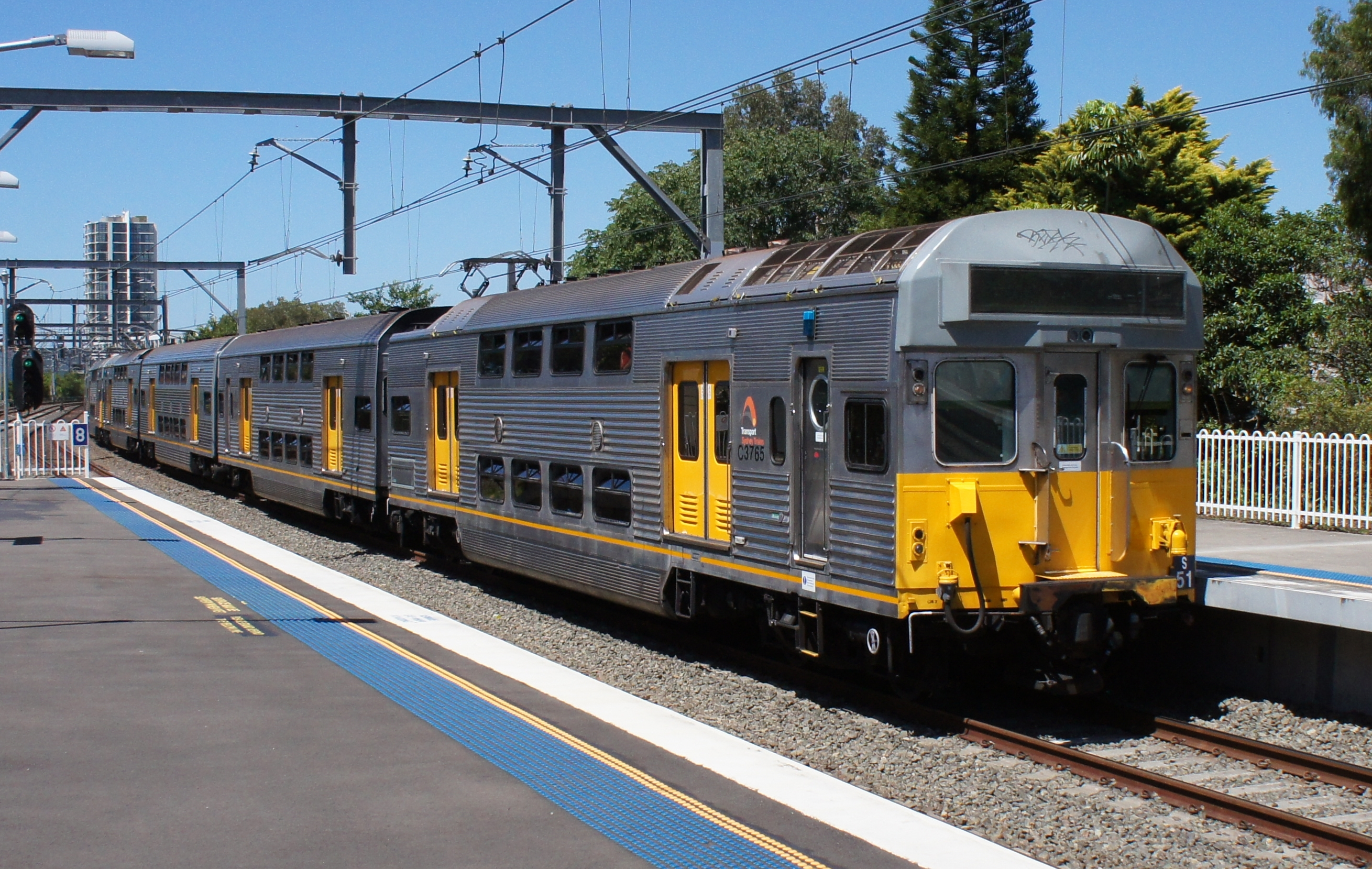
Comeng power car

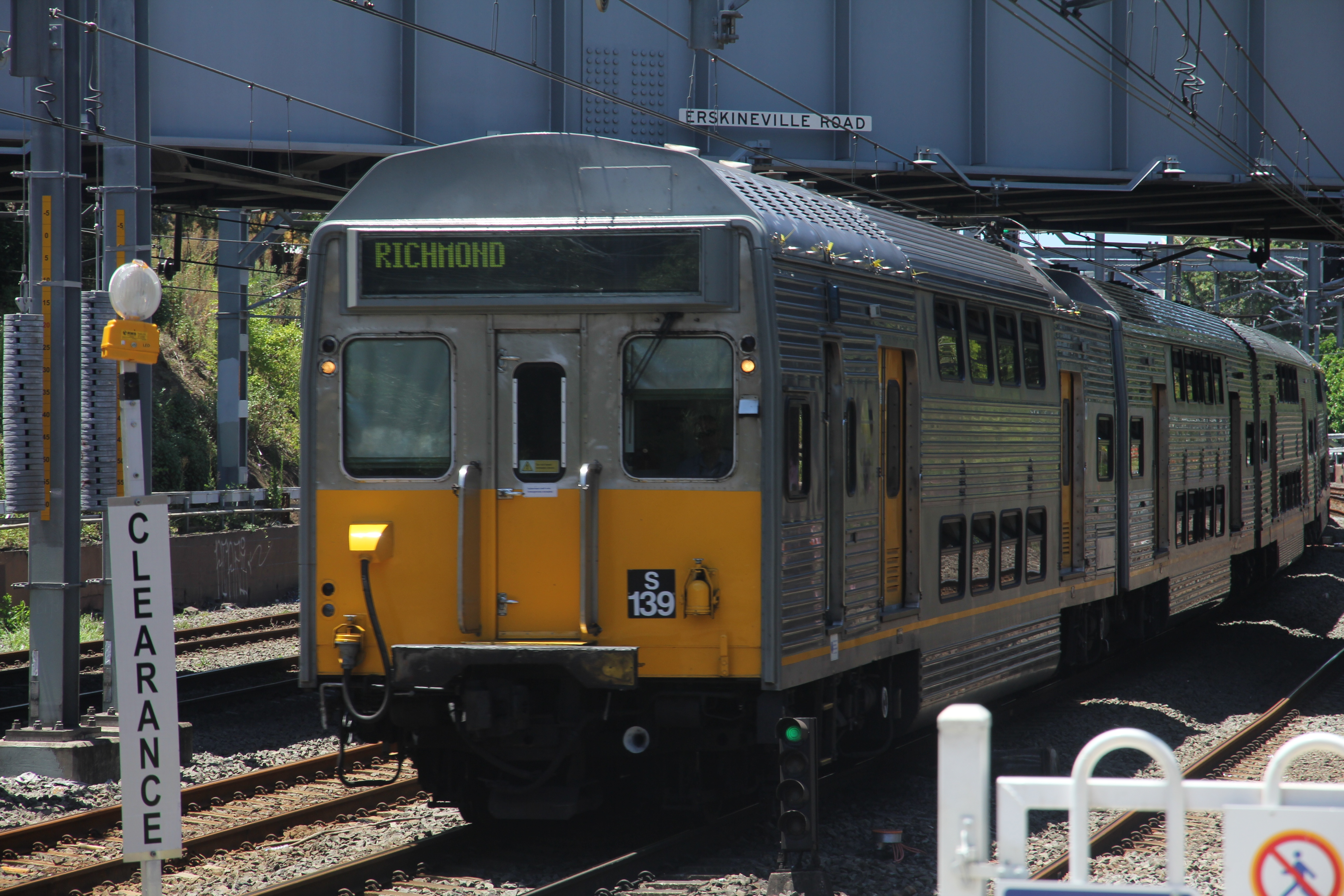
A Goninan & Co power car

Two manufacturers built 509 carriages, based on a largely common design. They were based on the Tulloch Double deck power cars (C3801–C3804) and the numbers of the Comeng built motor cars would follow on from this.

- 359 carriages were built by Comeng between 1972 and 1980.
- They were externally distinguished by the peaked front of driving cars and a prominent line across each side of its carriages above the upper deck windows. They also had thin flutings at the top and upper half of the sides of the carriages.
- The Series 1 Comeng power cars featured no fluting on the lower half of the carriage and one peaked front and rear end.
- The Series 2/3 Comeng power cars featured fluting on the lower half of the carriage and one peaked front end. These two types were identical aesthetically.
- The Series 4 Comeng power cars were identical to the Series 2/3 cars with minor improvements to the design.
- Cars D4011–D4020 were built without cab doors. Because of this, they were banned from use as driving cars by the Australian Federated Union of Locomotive Engineer men (AFULE), who claimed that there was no suitable exit for the driver. This led to the controls being stripped and the cars being used as normal trailers.
- Cars D4021–D4095 addressed the AFULE's concerns and were built with cab doors, thus they were near identical to the motor cars, the only difference being the absence of electrical equipment and pantographs.
- Despite these improvements, the AFULE banned these cars as well, this time due to driver complaints about being punched in the back when the control motors shoved the driving trailers forward. This also led to all but the last 10 cars being converted to normal trailers as well.
- All 85 driving trailers were eventually converted into trailer cars with the driving compartment, cab and guard instruments removed with head and tail lights plated over.

Qty	Series	Class	Car numbers
207	Mk1	Power car	C3805–C3857
207	Mk2	Power car	C3858–C3911
207	Mk3	Power car	C3912–C3986
207	Mk4	Power car	C3741–C3765
67	Mk1	Trailer car	T4921–T4962
67	Mk2	Trailer car	T4963–T4987
85	Mk3	Driving trailer	D4011–D4020
85	Mk4	Driving trailer	D4021–D4095

- 150 carriages built by A Goninan & Co between 1978 & 1980. They were externally distinguished by the flat front of driving cars and lower windows on the upper deck. They also had larger windows at the end between carriages. They also had thicker flutings at the top and around the top of the carriages and lacked the line around the top of the sides of the carriages unlike the Comeng carriages.

Carriage numbers	Class
C3001–C3080	Power cars
T4101–T4170	Trailer cars

== History ==
=== In service ===
C3806 leading set S11 in May 1972

Following the successful trial of four double-deck power cars built by Tulloch in 1969, 53 Series 1 power cars were ordered from Comeng and delivered in 1972–73.

They were paired with 1964–66 Tulloch-built trailer carriages that had previously operated in company with single deck power cars. The first 39 were painted tuscan to match the trailer cars while the last 14 were painted in the newly introduced Public Transport Commission blue and white livery, although this livery was applied differently on some carriages with the Riviera white stripe being painted on higher up on some carriages than others. In response to distance visibility complaints from trackside workers, four motor cars were painted with a chrome yellow front.

From 1976, the blue and white livery was replaced by an Indian red livery. In 1979, painted Series 1 cars began to have their paint removed to match the Series 2 cars. Only seven were completed, and it was not until August 1988 that the program recommenced with the last carriage treated in 1990.

Subsequent orders saw another 154 power cars, 67 trailer cars and 85 driving trailer cars built by Comeng. These were all built to the Series 2 design with Budd type polished inserts on the carriage sides, flat rather than tapered number 2 ends, throw-over rather than sliding reversible seats, upgraded interior lights and a natural stainless steel finish. As noted above, the driving trailers could not be used to their full extent due to Union bans due to the lack of cab doors (on older D cars) and the uncomfortable kicking (on most D cars).

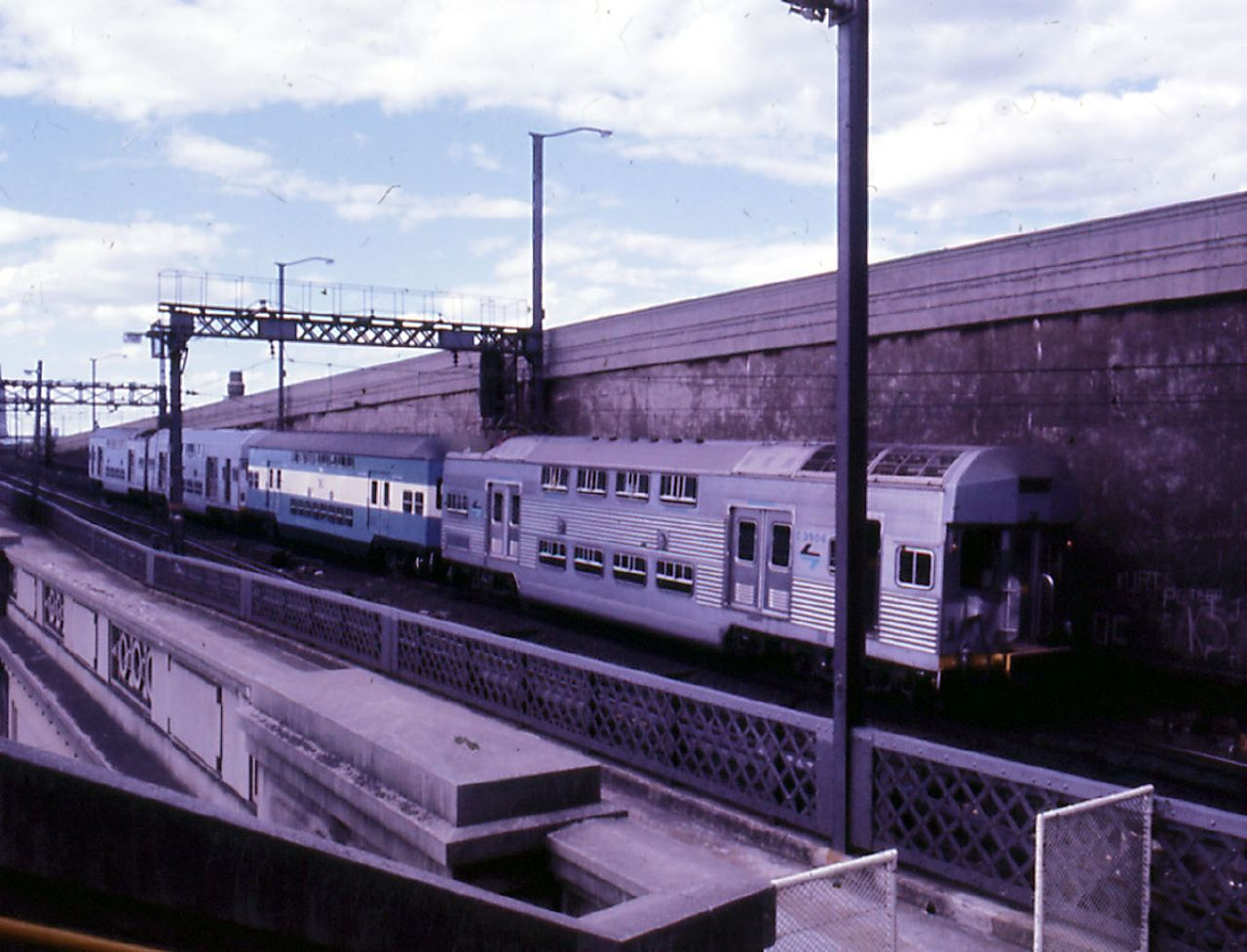
An S set with a PTC-liveried Tulloch trailer on the Sydney Harbour Bridge, 1977

A further order saw 80 power cars and 70 trailer cars constructed by A Goninan & Co in 1978–80. These cars differed in having a squarer type of fluting and flat fronts on the power cars.

All were formed into either four-car S sets or two-car T sets. In practice, there were only a few diagrams requiring two carriage sets. For this reason, and because of the Union ban on driving trailer cars, most T sets were used to form six and eight-car sets. By the early 1980s, some permanent six-car sets had been formed and targeted as R sets. In December 1983 there were 60 T sets, 12 months later this was down to 19.

In April 1982, ten driving trailers were introduced on local services between Scarborough and Port Kembla. They were targeted as PK sets, and operated in two-car sets. These PK sets ran until the line was electrified in December 1985. They were hauled by 48 class diesels but because of incompatibility between the electrical systems, the guard operated doors were disconnected.

From June 1984, four three-car sets of Goninan stock operated suburban services from Newcastle to Fassifern and Morisset as NC sets. This stock was allocated to Mortdale and periodically rotated. In August 1989, this was reduced to two sets. In September 1989, the remaining NC sets were replaced by two carriage L sets from Hornsby. These were replaced in January 1992.

In May 1987, the ten newest driving trailers based at Hornsby were renumbered D4001–D4010 and were permanently coupled to their accompanying motor cars to address the Union's issue of uncomfortable kicks. The remainder began to have their control equipment removed and revert to ordinary trailers. To allow the Tangaras to be targeted as T sets, the remaining two-car sets became L sets in April 1988.

To operate services on the newly electrified Riverstone to Richmond line from August 1991, all 10 driving trailers and a number of Series 1 power cars were fitted with headlights.

From October 1996, two-car L sets replaced U sets on suburban services between Thirroul, Port Kembla and Kiama. These were later extended to three cars before being replaced by Tangaras in October 2011.

During the 1990s, all carriages were refurbished as part of the CityDecker program. This saw the interiors refurbished with white walls and ceilings, grey floors and blue seats. Power cars received a destination indicator and had yellow applied to the lower half of their fronts. Sliding Beclawat windows were replaced with hopper windows and doors painted yellow.

=== Accidents and early withdrawals ===
Car (s)	incident	Manufacturer	Type
C3825	Burned by arsonists at Liverpool on 25 August 1973	Comeng	Power car
D4017	Burned by arsonists at Redfern on 15 June 1976	Comeng	Driving trailer
C3877	Burned by arsonists at Villawood on 14 December 1976	Comeng	Power car
C3070	Damaged beyond repair in a shunting accident at Hornsby on 8 February 1980	Goninan	Power car
T4928	Burned by arsonists at Artarmon on 5 January 1983	Comeng	Trailer car
C3866	Damaged beyond repair in a collision at Hornsby on 16 June 1990	Comeng	Power car
C3827, C3849	Damaged beyond repair in a collision at Waterfall on 20 December 1994	Comeng	Power car
C3905, D4047	Burned by fire at Mortdale on 23 July 1995 (D4047 written off after 1994 Waterfall collsion)	Comeng	Power car Driving trailer
D4020	Damaged beyond repair in a collision at Bondi Junction	Comeng	Driving trailer

=== Replacement ===
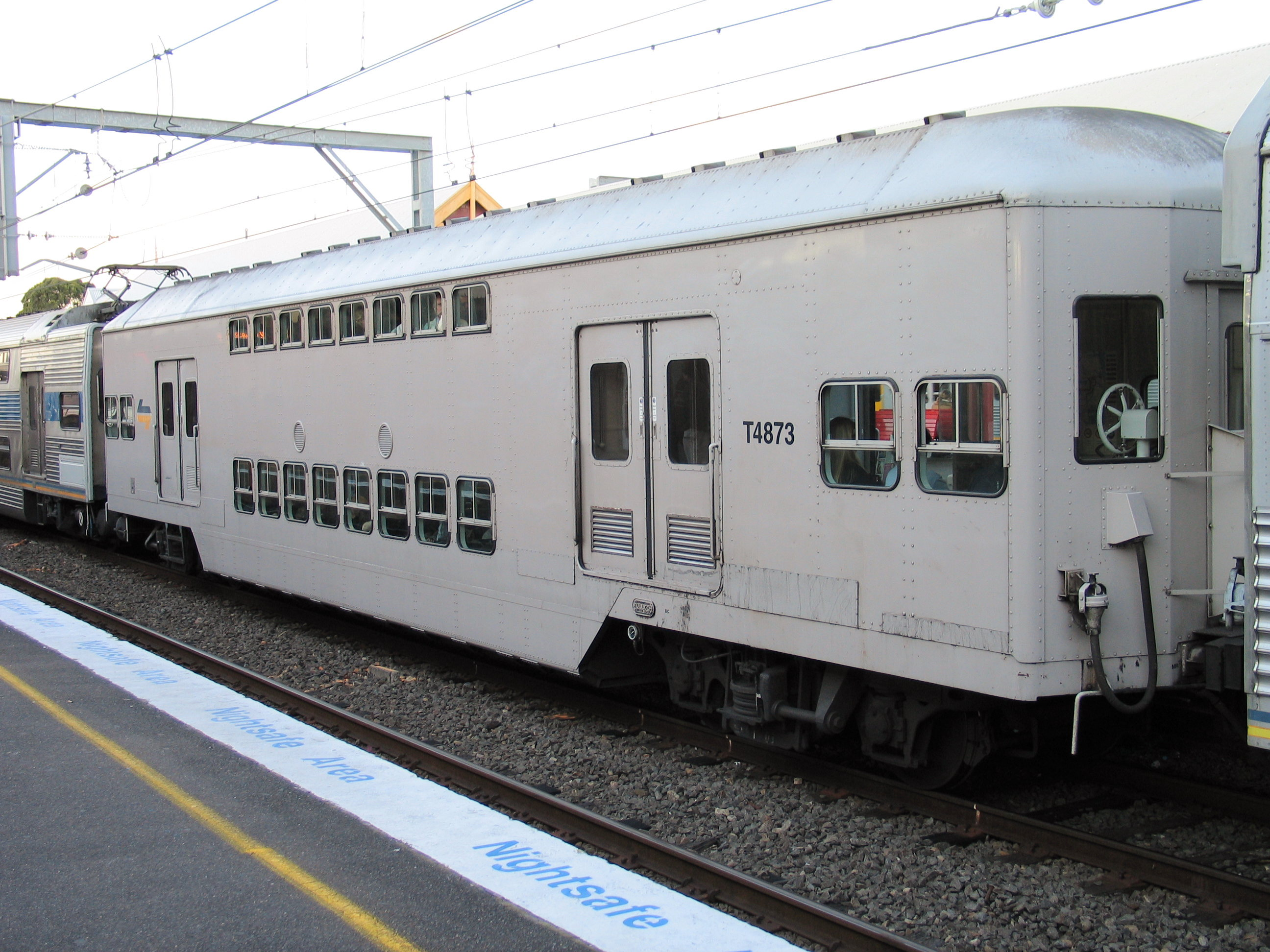
Tulloch trailer T4873 at Sydenham station in July 2003

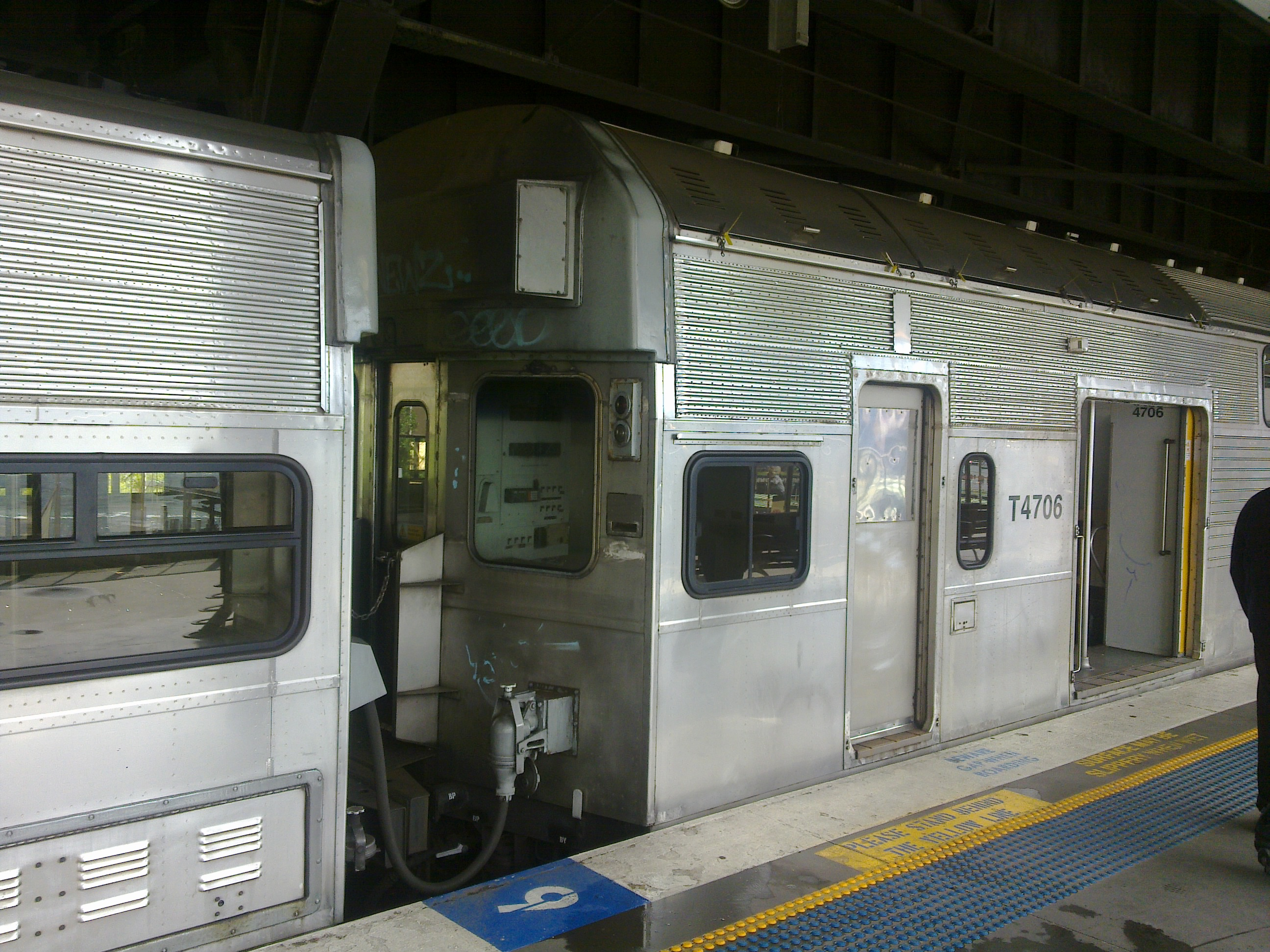
T4706 (ex. C3844) in 2011 at Circular Quay station

After nearly 40 years of service, the Tulloch trailers were deemed life expired and the last withdrawn in March 2004. This resulted in a disproportionate number of power cars. To address the balance, 23 Comeng power cars were converted into trailers. 16 conversions were Series 1 cars, however 7 conversions involved Series 2 cars.

Conversions
Car	Ex	Series	Converted	Originally built
T4701	C3864	2	July 2003	January 1974
T4702	C3846	1	August 2003	February 1973
T4703	C3907	2	August 2003	January 1976
T4704	C3886	2	August 2003	March 1975
T4705	C3834	1	August 2003	November 1972
T4706	C3844	1	August 2003	February 1973
T4707	C3895	2	September 2003	June 1975
T4708	C3824	1	March 2005	September 1972
T4709	C3833	1	March 2005	November 1972
T4710	C3815	1	November 2004	June 1972
T4711	C3838	1	November 2004	December 1972
T4712	C3909	2	December 2004	February 1976
T4713	C3841	1	December 2004	January 1973
T4714	C3854	1	January 2005	May 1973
T4715	C3870	2	January 2005	July 1974
T4716	C3819	1	January 2005	July 1972
T4717	C3822	1	May 2005	September 1972
T4718	C3852	1	March 2005	March 1973
T4719	C3835	1	February 2005	December 1972
T4720	C3816	1	April 2005	June 1972
T4721	C3859	2	March 2005	November 1973
T4722	C3820	1	April 2005	July 1972
T4723	C3839	1	April 2005	December 1972

This involved the removal of the yellow painted front (on some cars), pantograph and opening up of the driving compartment for passengers. Some cars had their external lights removed and plated over, and their cabs removed, other retained these fittings. All retained their motors and compressors for ballast purposes.

The destination indicators were also retained as it would have cost too much to have them removed; they were painted over instead. These cars were renumbered T4701–T4723 and were easy to recognise as they have an open space were the pantograph once was.

During their history, S sets operated on all Sydney lines. The last six car R sets were deemed life expired in August 2012, with all carriages formed into four car S sets (which were typically operated in pairs).

The last sets were transferred from Mortdale to Flemington in March 2013 bringing an end to their operation on Eastern Suburbs & Illawarra services. However, one set remained operational through parts of March and April on the line. In May 2014, all Hornsby sets were transferred to Flemington.

All remaining 498 carriages were to be replaced by A sets from 2012, with the last scheduled for replacement in 2015. In March 2013, it was revealed that forty eight S sets would need to be retained after the full introduction of the A sets, as the option to build further A sets had lapsed, meaning no trains had been ordered for the South West Rail Link.

The last Series 1 power car was withdrawn in January 2014. The final A set was delivered in June 2014. Following the delivery of the final A sets, Sydney Trains retained 48 four-car sets (192 carriages).

In June 2014, the government announced that all timetabled services except those on the T7 Olympic Park shuttle, would be operated by air-conditioned trains. With the introduction of a new timetable in November 2017, 40 four car sets were temporarily required to operate the weekday service, while the B sets were delivered. This meant that S sets would once again be scheduled to operate services on all lines in Sector 2.

==== Final days ====
The remaining forty eight S sets were gradually replaced by twenty four eight-carriage B set trains throughout the course of 2018 and 2019, with 14 S set carriages being retained for heritage purposes. Six S sets were initially kept for emergencies but sufficient availabilities of other air-conditioned rolling stock ultimately deemed this redundant.

The new B sets replaced timetabled K set runs, while the K sets moved on to S set runs. The remaining S sets were mostly phased out by the end of April 2019, with the introduction of an updated timetable of the Sydney Trains network. All of the final sets were withdrawn by June 2019.

On 27 June 2019, Transport Minister Andrew Constance joined Sydney Trains Chief Executive Howard Collins and rail employees on a farewell run from Central Station across the Sydney Harbour Bridge to Lavender Bay. The last timetabled S set service ran on the following night, on 28 June 2019, on the T7 Olympic Park Line with sets S140 (C3057, T4141, T4983, and C3947) and S61 (C3930, T4030, T4037 and C3931).

Two public farewell events were held on Sunday 21 July 2019. The final revenue S set service was a special charter on the afternoon of 21 July, organised by the Sydney Electric Train Society (SETS) and operated in conjunction with Transport Heritage NSW and Sydney Trains.

During their final days S sets operated on the following lines:

- T2 Inner West and Leppington Line: Leppington/Parramatta to City via Granville
- T3 Bankstown Line: Liverpool/Lidcombe to City via Bankstown
- T6 Carlingford Line: Clyde to Carlingford
- T7 Olympic Park Line: Lidcombe to Olympic Park
- T8 Airport and South Line: Macarthur to City via Airport/Sydenham

== Preservation ==
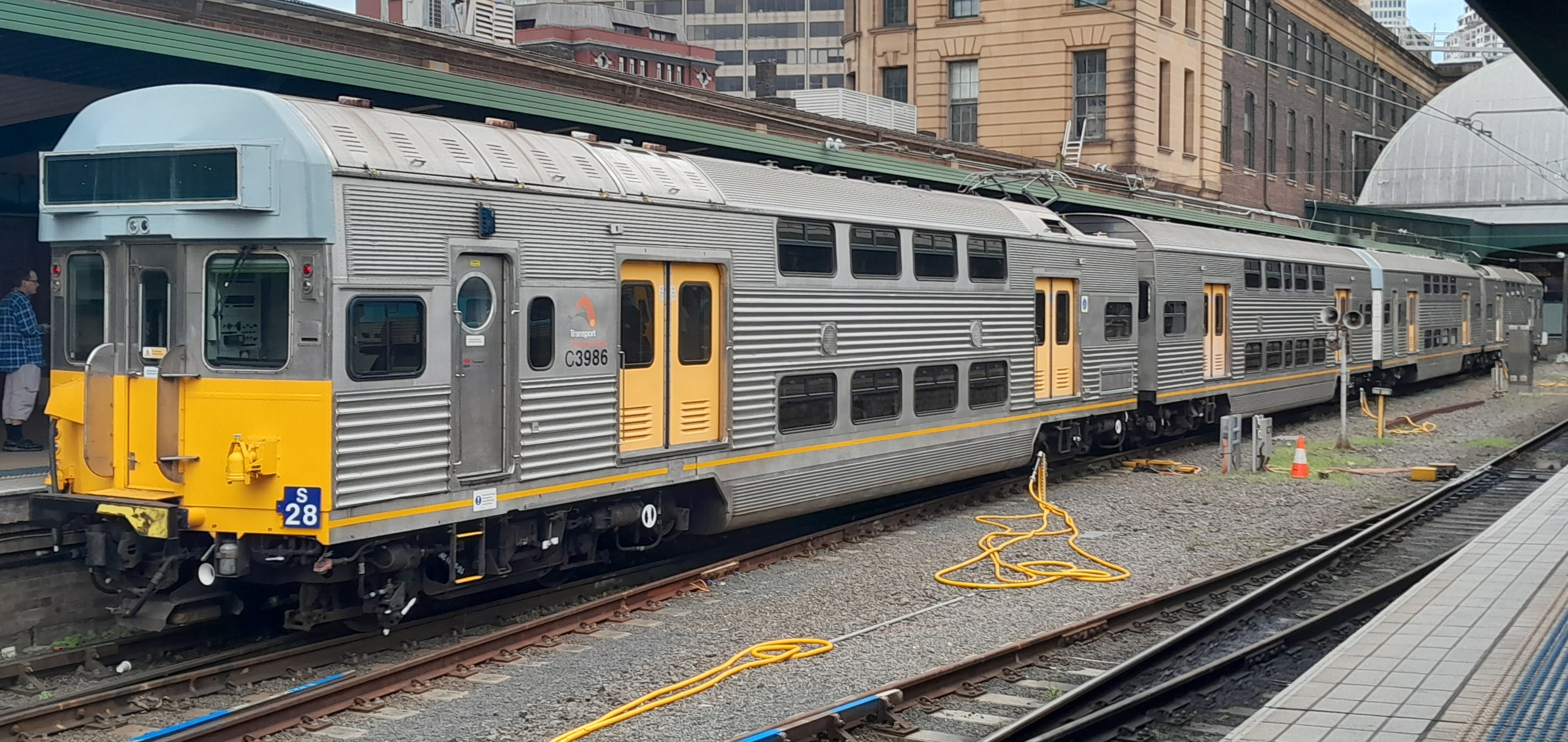
Heritage S set S28 at Central station in 2025

A total of 16 carriages still remain. In 2008, cars C3840 and T4058 from set R42 were withdrawn and placed at the Petersham Training Centre outside the railway station. While two of these carriages presently remain at Petersham, these carriages are not considered preserved.

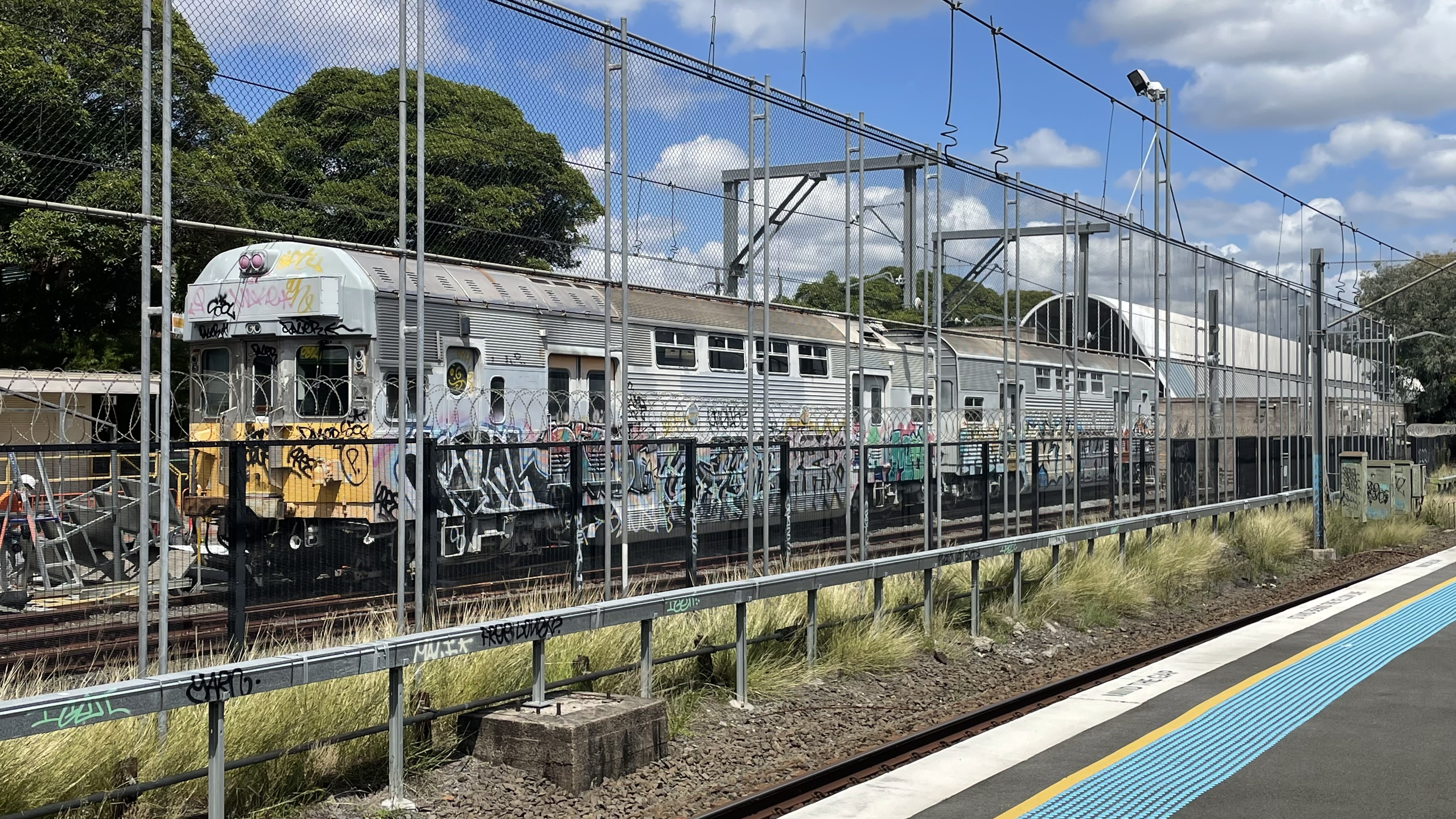
C3840 and T4058 in 2023

The others were retained by Sydney Trains/Transport Heritage NSW and SETS, with 10 being held by the former and 4 being held by the latter. This included both four car sets used for the SETS farewell tour as well as two extra carriages that had been withdrawn in the early 2010s.

On 20 February 2015, carriages, C3814, T4150 and C3805, were transferred from Flemington to Broadmeadow before another transfer to Redfern, with the first transfer being done by 44 class locomotive 4473 along with three stainless steel carriages. C3814 was stripped for parts and scrapped in 2024 at Redfern.

Some other carriages still remain in the custody of HET and are being restored to operation. Of the two four car sets, set S28 (C3986, T4013, T4050 and C3765) remains operational whilst the other, S56 (C3001, T4961, T4101 and C3862), is in storage. Notably, cars C3986 and C3765 on set S28, are the last series 3 and series 4 S set motors built by Comeng. SETS has a four car heritage set, designated set S1 (C3861, T4983, T4003 and C3057).

Below are the surviving carriages:

Car Number	Set	Owner	Manufactuer	Build Date	Notes
C3001	S56	Sydney Trains / THNSW	A Goninan & Co	20 December 1978	First Goninan S set motor carriage. Under restoration.
C3057	S1	SETS	A Goninan & Co	22 April 1980	
C3765	S28	Sydney Trains / THNSW	Commonwealth Engineering	9 May 1980	
C3805		Sydney Trains / THNSW	Commonwealth Engineering	4 April 1972	Painted in PTC blue and white between February 1976 and the 1980s. First Comeng S set carriage. Under restoration.
C3840	DT1	Sydney Trains (Lewisham Training Centre)	Commonwealth Engineering	January 1973	Petersham Training Centre. Painted flake grey and yellow (likely) to deter vandalism. Destination board is covered. Not accessible to the public.
C3861	S1	SETS	Commonwealth Engineering	4 December 1973	
C3862	S56	Sydney Trains / THNSW	Commonwealth Engineering	10 December 1973	Oldest S set carriage at the time of Withdrawal.
C3986	S28	Sydney Trains / THNSW	Commonwealth Engineering	July 1978	
T4003 (ex. D4080)	S1	SETS	Commonwealth Engineering	5 March 1979 (as D4080) July 1987 (as D4003) October 2005 (as T4003)	
T4013 (ex. D4013)	S28	Sydney Trains / THNSW	Commonwealth Engineering	22 February 1974	
T4050 (ex. D4050)	S28	Sydney Trains / THNSW	Commonwealth Engineering	11 July 1977	
T4058 (ex. D4058)	DT1	Sydney Trains	Commonwealth Engineering	October 1977 (As D4058) October 1997 (As T4058)	Petersham Training Centre. Painted flake grey (likely) to deter vandalism. Not accessible to the public.
T4101	S56	Sydney Trains / THNSW	A Goninan & Co	20 December 1978	First Goninan S set trailer carriage. Under restoration.
T4150		Sydney Trains / THNSW	A Goninan & Co	9 May 1980	Carriage that Queen Elizabeth rode on. Under restoration.
T4961	S56	Sydney Trains / THNSW	Commonwealth Engineering	14 April 1976	
T4983	S1	SETS	Commonwealth Engineering	20 November 1978	

*DT1 is denoted on internal fleet lists as of circa June 2016.

== In popular culture ==
- Many of the scenes in the music video of the 2020 single Old Me, by pop-rock band 5 Seconds of Summer, were filmed inside S set carriage C3805.
