= New South Wales C set =

Retired class of electric multiple unit operated in New South Wales

C set
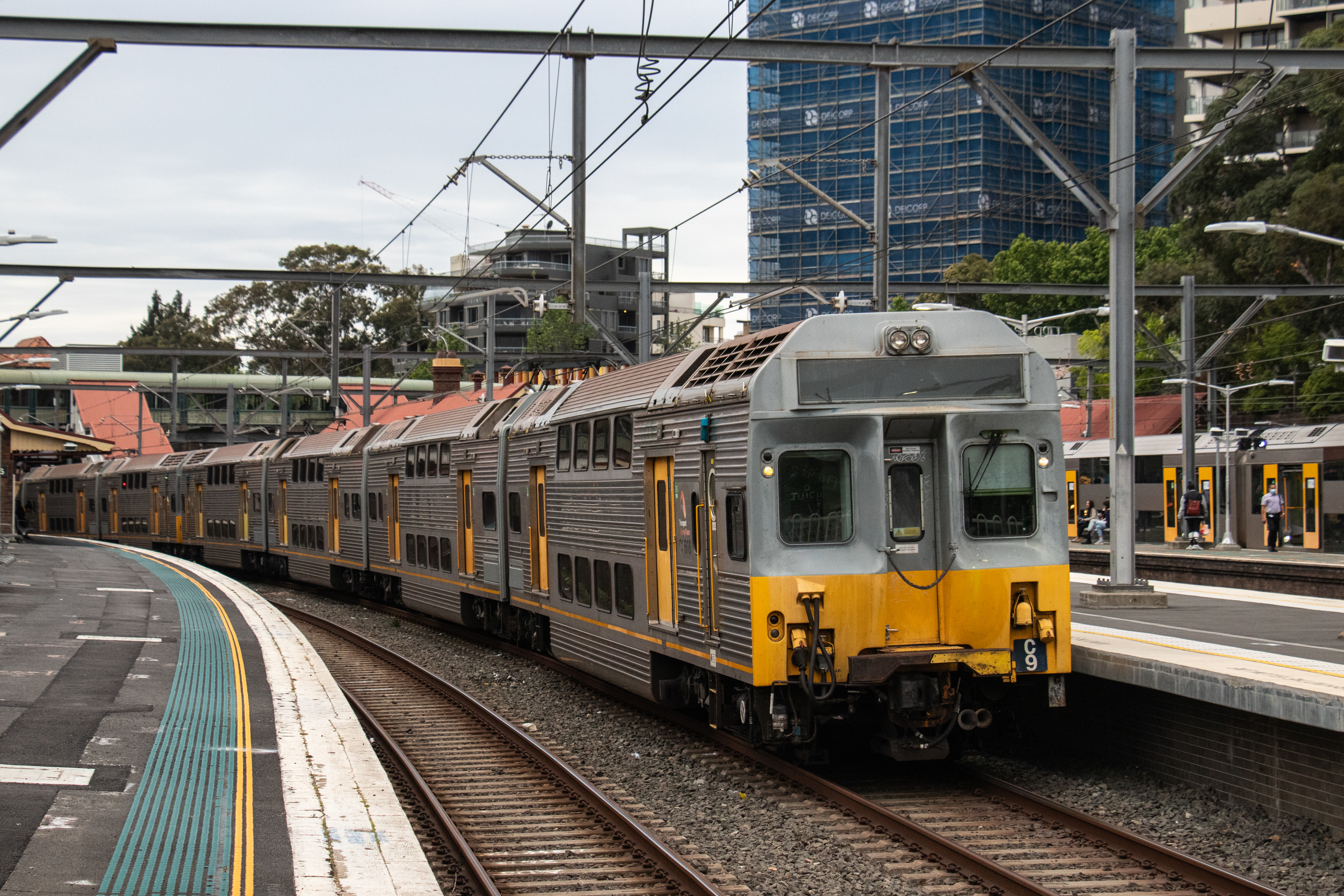
- C9 (Leading) and C7 (Trailing) at Redfern in September 2020

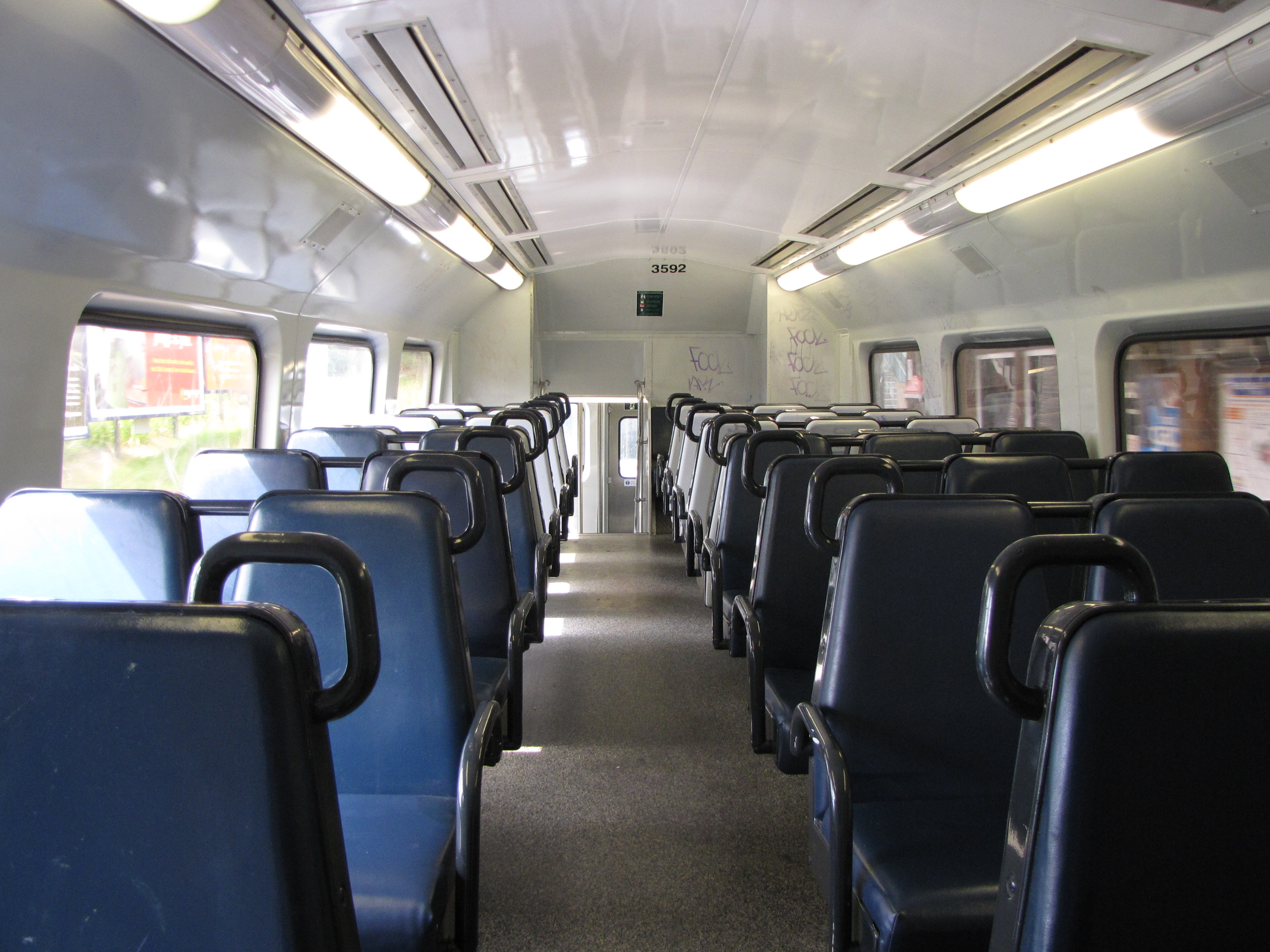
- Upper deck after CityDecker refurbishment
- Stock type: Electric Multiple Unit
- In service: 25 July 1986 – 26 February 2021
- Manufacturer: A Goninan & Co
- Built at: Broadmeadow
- Constructed: 1986–1987
- Entered service: 1986–1987
- Refurbished: late 1990s
- Scrapped: 2021–2022, 2025
- Number built: 56 carriages (14 sets)
- Number preserved: 6 carriages
- Number scrapped: 40 carriages (10 pending)
- Successor: B sets (B25–B41)
- Formation: 4-car sets
- Fleet numbers: C3581–C3608, T4247–T4274
- Capacity: 438 (104 in control motors, 115 in trailer cars)
- Operators: State Rail Authority; CityRail; Sydney Trains
- Depot: Flemington
- Lines served: Inner West & Leppington; Bankstown; Airport & South

Specifications
- Car body construction: Stainless steel
- Train length: 81.54 m (267 ft 6 1/4 in)
- Car length: 20,385 mm (66 ft 10 1/2 in)
- Width: 3,036 mm (9 ft 11 1/2 in)
- Height: 4,368 mm (14 ft 4 in)
- Maximum speed: 115 km/h (71 mph)
- Weight: 190 t (190 long tons; 210 short tons)
- Traction system: Mitsubishi GTO–4-quadrant chopper control
- Traction motors: 8 × Mitsubishi MB-3303-B 170 kW (228 hp) 2-phase DC shunt-wound motor
- Power output: 1,360 kW (1,824 hp)
- Transmission: 4.94:1 (84:17) gear ratio
- Electric systems: 1,500 V DC (nominal) from overhead catenary
- Current collection: Pantograph
- UIC classification: Bo′Bo′+2′2′+2′2′+Bo′Bo′
- Track gauge: 1,435 mm (4 ft 8 1/2 in) standard gauge

The New South Wales C set is a class of double-decker electric multiple units that formerly operated on Sydney's suburban rail network in New South Wales, Australia from 1986 up until 2021. Built by A Goninan & Co between 1986 and 1987, they were introduced into service by the State Rail Authority, before later being operated under CityRail and Sydney Trains. A total of 56 carriages were built, with the last sets being withdrawn from service in February 2021, having been gradually replaced by B set trains.

== Design and construction ==
The C sets were originally built as Series 3 K sets. The second order of K sets, which were Series 2, composed of 100 cars; 50 motor cars numbered C3551 to C3600, and 50 trailer cars numbered T4217 to T4266. The first 60 were built to the "Series 2" specification, but the remaining 40 cars (C3581–C3600 and T4247–T4266) were built under a new specification. A further 16 cars were later built; 8 motor cars numbered C3601–C3608 and 8 trailer cars numbered T4267–T4274. The Series 3 K sets (later C sets) featured chopper control as an interim measure due to delays with the Tangara program. They were also used to train and familiarise staff with the new (at the time) chopper technology. These K sets were the first Sydney suburban trains to be fitted with chopper control, which gives the train smoother acceleration. Gate turn-off thyristors (GTO) were used to control power to the traction motors, hence allowing for smoother acceleration. Following the successful implementation of chopper control, these features were installed on the Tangara and later V set carriages (DJM).

The C set carriages were also the first on the suburban network to feature fixed seating (originally covered with fabric, since replaced with vinyl). These cars also featured push-button doors requiring passengers to activate, to increase air-conditioning efficiency. These proved unpopular and the push-buttons on the doors were removed.

The C set was distinguished externally by a fibreglass moulding mounted on the front of the power carriage. It was originally in the State Rail Authority white with orange and red candy livery stripes on the lower portion. C3596 was the only power car to have its Candy-liveried front repainted in CityRail blue and yellow prior to its CityDecker refurbishment in 1998. The chopper cars were amongst the heaviest in the suburban fleet, with the power cars weighing 52 tonnes.

In early 1986, C3584 and T4250 conducted tests on the SRA network between Pendle Hill and Westmead before commissioning. During these tests, C3584 did not have the fibreglass front fairing it would be fitted with in service, and instead resembled a K-set power car. Neither car was fitted with seating when built.

The total for both orders was for 56 cars:

Qty	Class	Car numbers
28	Power cars	C3581–C3608
28	Trailer cars	T4247–T4274

A second C3581 was built as a demonstrator for the Tangaras, featuring a non-functional, raked-back fibreglass front end with a large black "window", a unique livery and a black border around the passenger window areas, but otherwise resembling a production-model K/C-set power car. It was exhibited at Central Station for the media, but was then stored before being scrapped in 1990.

== History ==
=== In service ===
The first set entered service in July 1986, operating out of Mortdale Maintenance Depot, some were delivered to Hornsby Maintenance Depot, but by December 1988, all were operating out of Punchbowl Maintenance Depot as sets K40-K51.

The chopper cars were originally classed as Series 3 K sets and for a while when they entered service, they ran together with the then-force ventilated K sets. This however caused problems in service as force-ventilated cars were fitted with camshaft control and led to jerking while accelerating. By December 1990, they had been separated into their own class retargeted as C sets; C42–C54. In January 1991, these were reformed as 6-car sets numbered C1–C8. By June 1991, all had been transferred to Hornsby Maintenance Depot.

One carriage, C3596 of set C5, was painted in a livery having its fibre-glass front being painted in CityRail colours, with the L7 logo.

During the late 1990s, all were refurbished by A Goninan & Co as part of the CityDecker program. This saw the interiors refurbished with white walls and ceilings, grey floors and blue seats. Power cars received a destination indicator and had the yellow apron livery applied which includes a grey front with yellow over the bottom half.

In 2001, the C sets were once again reformed into seven 8-car sets. A 6-car C Set was re-formed in late 2006 due to car T4262 being seriously damaged by an arson attack at Villawood in October 2006, however the full 8-car set later went back in operation.

In July 2017, asbestos was found in the circuit breaker panels, which was inside the driver compartment of the C sets, with all withdrawn for inspection.

From November 2017 until they were retired from service, all C Sets operated out of Flemington Maintenance Depot.

Prior to their retirement, C sets operated on the following lines:

- T2 Inner West and Leppington Line: Leppington or Parramatta to City Circle via Granville
- T3 Bankstown Line: Liverpool or Lidcombe to City Circle via Bankstown
- T8 Airport and South Line: Macarthur To City Circle via Airport or Sydenham

=== Retirement ===
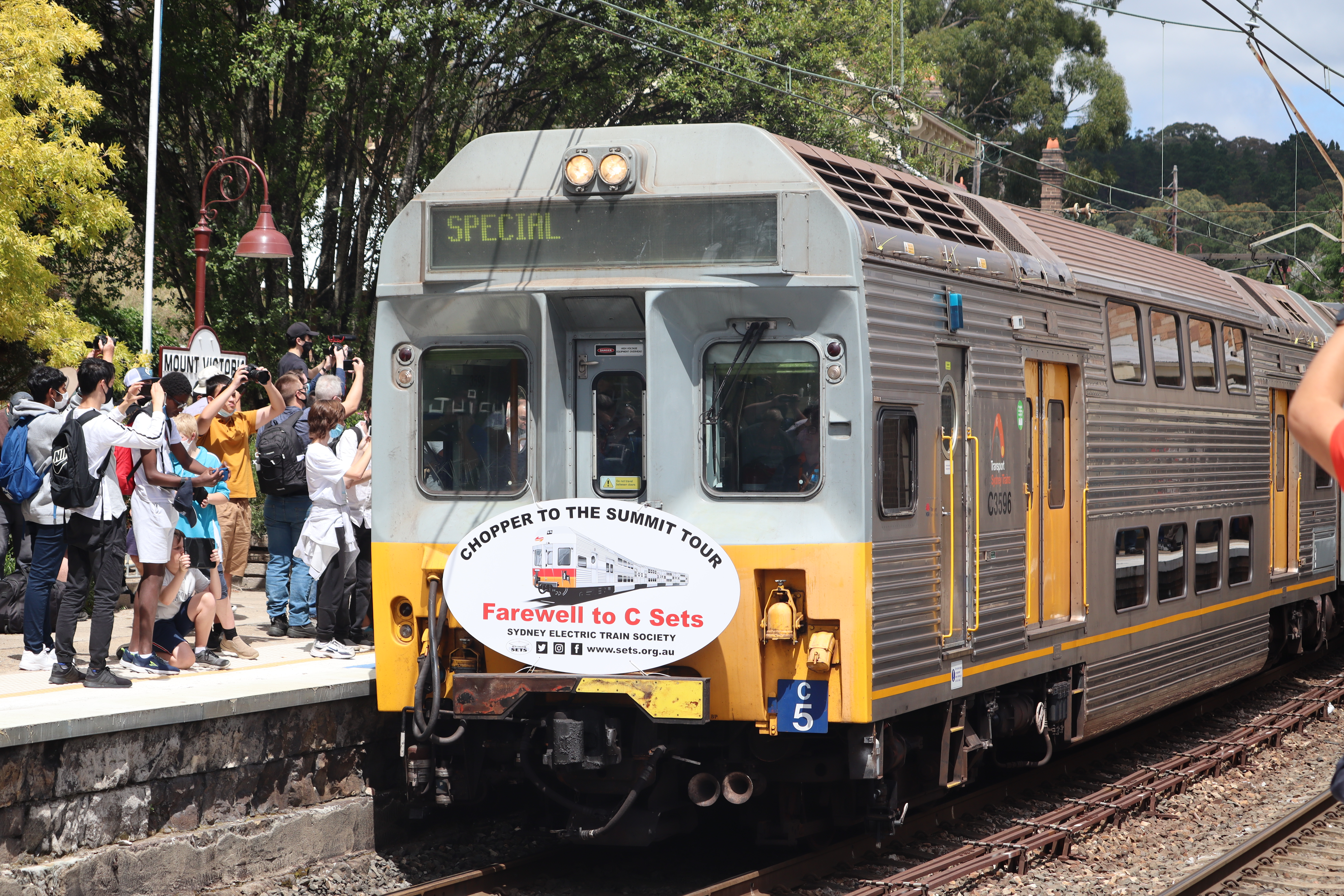
C5 on its final farewell SETS tour, at Mount Victoria, March 2021

Due to the extensive amount of work needed to keep the trains operational and the scarcity of parts, the C sets were gradually phased out from September 2020 to February 2021 with the first two sets to be withdrawn being C4 and C2, being replaced by B sets. The C sets ran their final revenue timetabled service on 26 February 2021 on the Airport & South Line. A farewell to the C Sets tour by the Sydney Electric Train Society took place on 6 March 2021 visiting Mount Victoria and Hawkesbury River.

Two C sets (C1 and C5) remained as standby sets for emergencies from their retirement until 30 April 2021.

Over the course of 2021, C Sets were transferred from Flemington to the Chullora Disposal Sidings for scrapping.

Most transfers were documented by train spotters:

- On 8 February 2021, Sets C2 and C4 were transferred by Pacific National diesel locomotives 8144 and 8252.
- On 13 May 2021, C6, C7, C8 were transferred by Pacific National diesel locomotives 8144 and 8234. Later the same day, C10 and C12 were transferred by Pacific National diesel locomotives 8234 and 8138.
- On 12 July 2021, the final transfer was of sets C1, C3, and half of sets C5 and C9 undertaken by Pacific National diesel locomotives 8133 and 8155.

== Preservation ==
SETS' untargeted heritage C Set at Auburn in 2026

In 2019, Transport Heritage NSW expressed no interest in preserving a C set for heritage. They also were recommended against the preservation of any K set carriages as well.

In May 2021, two cars from set C11 were taken by Fire and Rescue NSW to their facility in Orchard hill for training purposes. These were class leader C3581 and T4272.

In July 2021, the Sydney Electric Train Society (SETS) announced that they would be preserving four carriages for heritage. These carriages were C3584 and T4266 taken from C5 and T4274 and C3608 from C9. It was intended that they will be operational for tours operated by SETS, including the Great Northern Chopper Tour, which was initially scheduled for 28 August 2021, but was postponed due to COVID-19, with no new date announced since.

The trip was planned to also go via the Bankstown Line, but now the line between Bankstown and Sydenham via Campsie is set to be part of the Metro North West & Bankstown Line run by Sydney Metro. The cars that were set aside for preservation by SETS are currently stored at Auburn Heavy Maintenance Centre alongside retired S Set carriages C3861, T4983, T4003, and C3057. As of November 2025, SETS is currently working with Sydney trains to rehouse the stock and return the C Set to heritage service (to join SETS operational 86 class electric locomotives).

Car Number	Image	Last Set	Owner	Build Date	Notes
C3581		C11	Fire and Rescue NSW	March 1987	
C3584		C5	SETS	19 July 1986	Used in two car test set at Pendle Hill
C3608		C9	SETS	15 September 1987	
T4266		C5	SETS	20 March 1987	
T4272		C11	Fire and Rescue NSW	August 1987	
T4274		C9	SETS	15 September 1987	Last double deck stainless steel trailer built
