= Rail rolling stock in New South Wales =

The government railways of New South Wales, Australia, use a large variety of passenger rolling stock. The first railway in Sydney was opened in 1855 between Sydney and Granville, now a suburb of Sydney but then a major agricultural centre. The railway formed the basis of the New South Wales Government Railways. Passenger and freight services were operated from the beginning. By 1880, there was a half hourly service to Homebush.

== Former suburban passenger rolling stock ==
=== Suburban steam locomotives ===
==== M36 Class ====
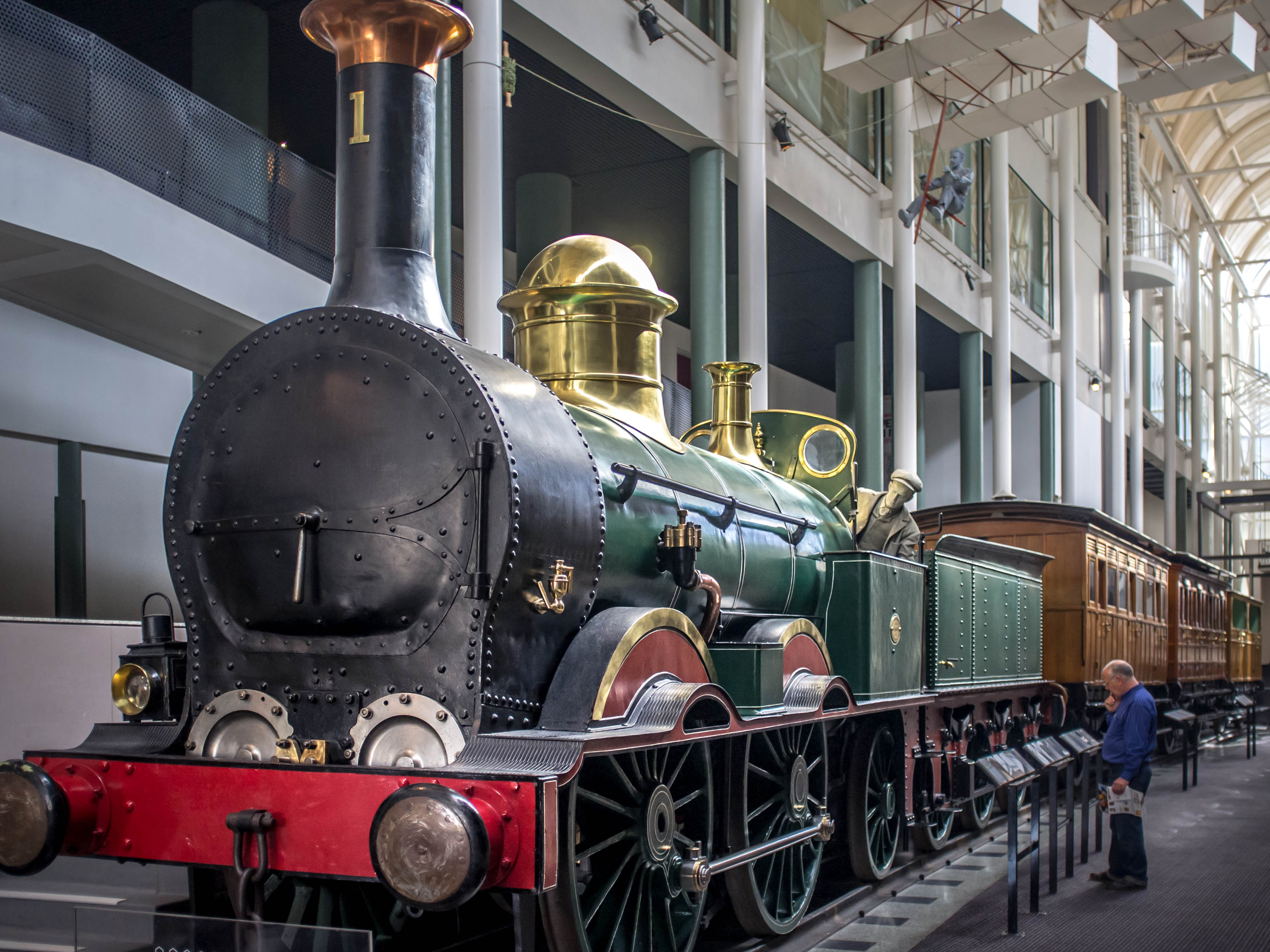
locomotive No. 1 at the Sydney powerhouse museum.

In the late 1860s, four more of the 1 class were manufactured by Mort's Dock & Engineering Company Sydney in 1870–71. Another four locomotives of the M.36 class were manufactured at Eveleigh Railway Workshops in 1876–77 using re-built tenders from Locomotive No.1–4. Two of the class later had cab shelters fitted to the tenders for suburban running.

==== Z18 Class ====
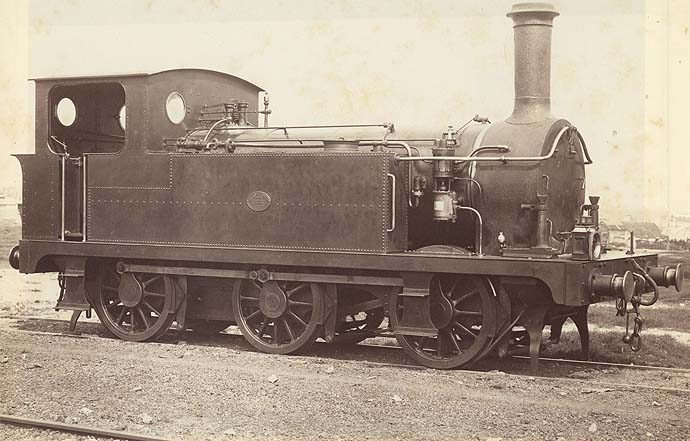
Z18 class locomotive

An order was placed in February 1882, with the Vulcan Foundry for six 2-4-0T locomotives to the specification of the then Acting Locomotive Engineer, Mr Scott. During Mr Scott’s subsequent absence in England on official business, Thomas Middleton, Locomotive Engineer, had the specifications altered to 0-6-0T wheel arrangement with 4'0" diameter driving wheels, together with other variations to the original order. Middleton claimed that the revised design would enable the locomotives to run at 30–33 mph (48–53 km/h) in suburban service. Commissioner Goodchap approved the changes and despite the protests on Scott’s return, the variations were made.

The six locomotives were delivered in 1884 and designated the 285 class. They became the (R) 285 class in 1889 and the Z18 class in 1924.

Their 4-foot-0-inch (1.219 m) driving wheels proved too small for the speed required and they were reduced to shunting duties in Sydney Yard, with just the occasional venture into the suburbs.

In 1907, the locomotives were fitted with new domed boilers, replacing the domeless versions originally fitted. This increased their weight by 3 tons which improved their adhesion factor. Power reversing gear was fitted in 1922, making them the first class in New South Wales to be so fitted. It was a hydraulic type and was excellent when shunting at Sydney station, however this was only short lived and Johnson bar lever reversing gear was fitted shortly after.

In 1927, following the release of other locomotives with the electrification of the Sydney suburban network, the class was transferred to locomotive depot work, some being fitted with cranes and renumbered into the (X)10 series. Later, with the cranes removed, they were restored to their Z18 numbers and worked at Port Kembla shunting. 1076 was an exception which continued to be known by that number. No. 1802 (originally R286) was sold to the Public Works Department in 1927 and became their No. 75. It continued in service until it was cut up for scrap metal in 1964. 1801 and 1806 were sold to the Wallarah Coal Company in 1957 and worked on the isolated Catherine Hill Bay Coal Railway until the line ceased operation in December 1963.

==== F351 Class ====
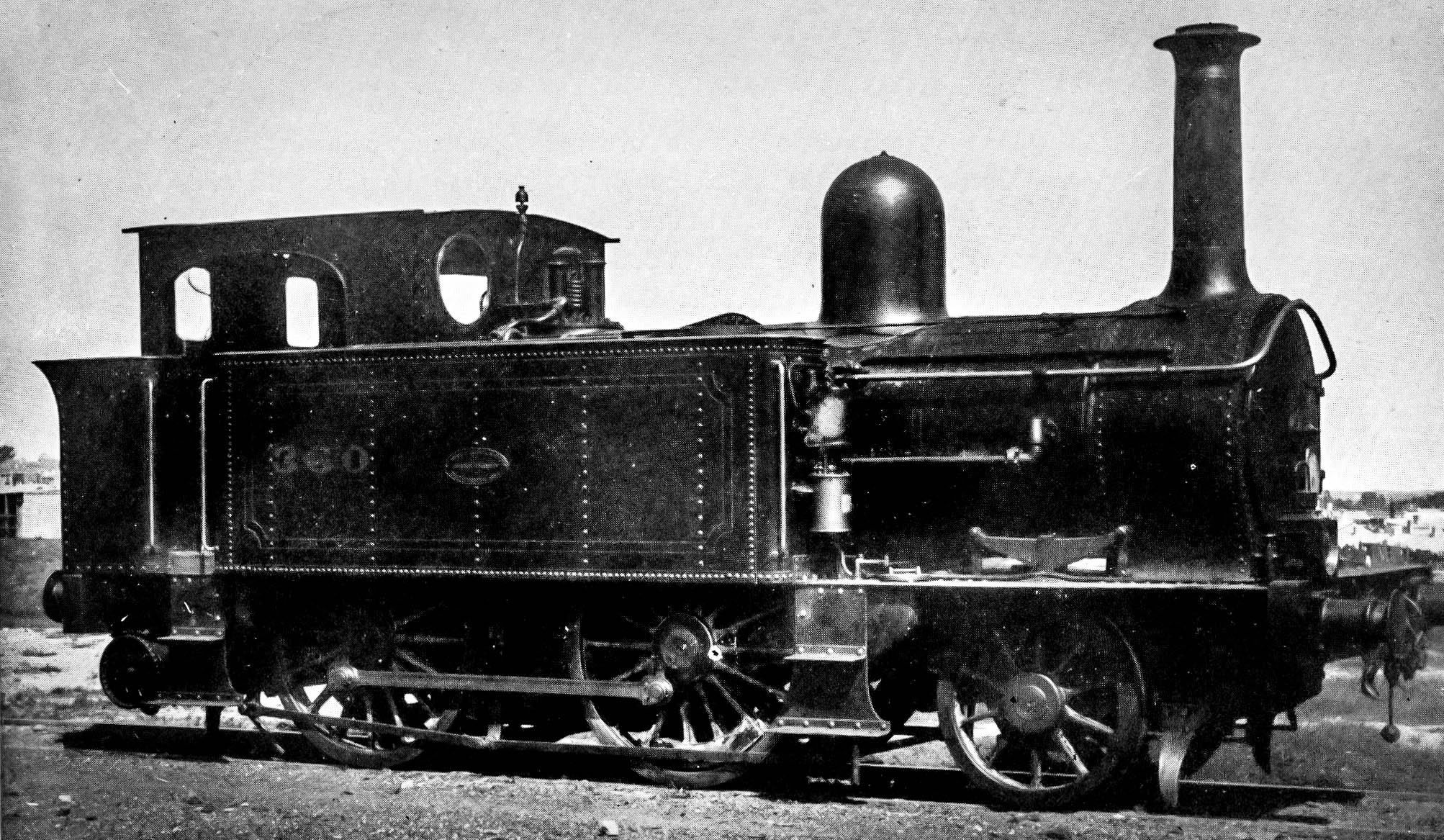
F351 class locomotive

Originally ordered in 1879, but the order was stopped. A follow-up order in 1882 was made, the specification originally for 2-4-0 tank locomotives with 5'0" diameter driving wheels made by the acting locomotive engineer Mr Scott. As noted above, the order was altered during Scott's absence, resulting in the R285/Z18 class.

In August 1884, Mr Scott informed the commissioner that more locomotives were required with the opening of the Illawarra extension. Mr Middelton wanted more of the R285 class, but Mr Scott recommended his original proposed design from 1881. After much hesitation by the government, Beyer, Peacock & Company were asked to design and build the locomotives. These became the F351 class and went into service on the Sydney suburban network in 1885–86, being numbered 351 to 362. In 1887, six more locomotives of this design (numbered 363 to 3680) were delivered by Henry Vale of Sydney. No. 366 featured in the Redfern collision of 1894. The design was extremely similar to a number of 2-4-0 tank locomotives supplied to the Isle of Wight Central Railway from 1864. A similar locomotive was delivered to the South Australian Railways in 1884 as their P-class.

Their running life came to an end in 1901 as a result of the findings on the Sydenham derailment involving No. 363 and the whole class was taken out of passenger work. The F351 class were known to oscillate and rock at high speeds and were officially limited to 30 mph. A factor in the Sydenham derailment was the driver exceeding the official speed limit. The locomotive was believed to be doing 51 mph when the accident occurred. The entire class was subsequently withdrawn from passenger work and allocated to various shunting, yard and depot duties. A number of the class were modified with a heavy cast iron front buffer beam in an attempt to stabilise the front of the locomotive after 1901. Between 1906 and 1929, ten of the class were sold to various private railway operators.

All members of the class had been withdrawn from passenger work by 1914. Eleven were still on the books at this stage and were renumbered Lo.19–Lo.26 (Lo. Indicated that they were no longer in revenue-earning service). In 1924 they were renumbered in the X10 class, bearing numbers 1031–1033, 1035–1037 and 1039–1043. From 1914, members of the class still in NSWGR service were rebuilt with the same domed boilers that replaced the dome-less type originally supplied on the R285 class. A number of other modifications were made to the class such as replacing the leaf spring on the front axle with twin coil springs. For reasons unknown 1033 at some stage had the original parallel buffers on the rear replaced with longer bottle-shaped Turton buffers. In 1966, 1036 with withdrawn and scrapped, but during an overhaul the boiler was given to 1076, previously numbered R288 then 1804.

Three of the class were still in service with the NSWGR from 1940. 1033 at Eveleigh Railway Workshops, 1036 at Junee Locomotive Depot (withdrawn and scrapped in 1966) and 1042 at Cardiff Railway Workshops.1042 was given an overhaul as late as 1970 at the age of 83 years and continued working until February 1973, only three months shy of 86 years in service and having completed 401,359 km (249,446 miles) of logged running. 1036 (F359) had accumulated the most mileage in service with 707,564 km (437,889 miles) at withdrawal.

==== Z11 Class ====
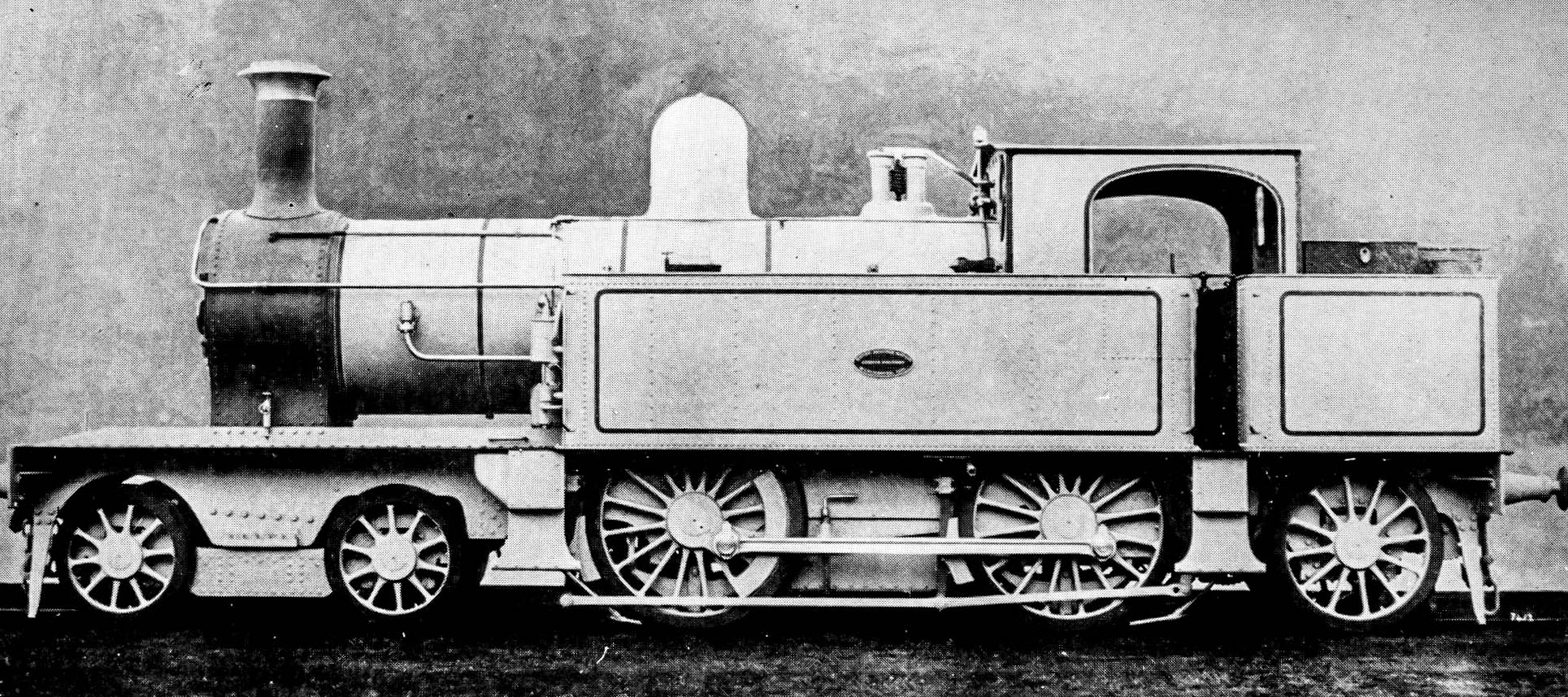
A Z11 class locomotive

The Z11 class (formerly the M40 class) was a class of steam locomotives built for the New South Wales Government Railways in Australia.

Built by Beyer, Peacock & Company of Manchester, they entered suburban traffic in Sydney in 1891.

They were primarily intended for use on the steeply-graded Strathfield-Hornsby and Milson's Point-Hornsby sections, hence their hefty weight which served to hinder them later in their careers. Because of this, they were never noted for spectacular performance.

Between 1906 and 1910, they were rebuilt with Belpaire boilers. They were soon superseded by the S636 class 4-6-4Ts and were promptly used on Newcastle suburban services for a period. In 1924, all were renumbered as part of the Z11 Class.

No. 50 was sold to Australian Iron & Steel Ltd., No. 51 to the South Maitland Railway, No. 1104 to the Nepean Sand & Gravel Company and No. 1111 to the Southern Portland Cement Company of Berrima. The remainder were sold for scrap between 1925 and 1927.

None are preserved.

==== Z13 Class ====
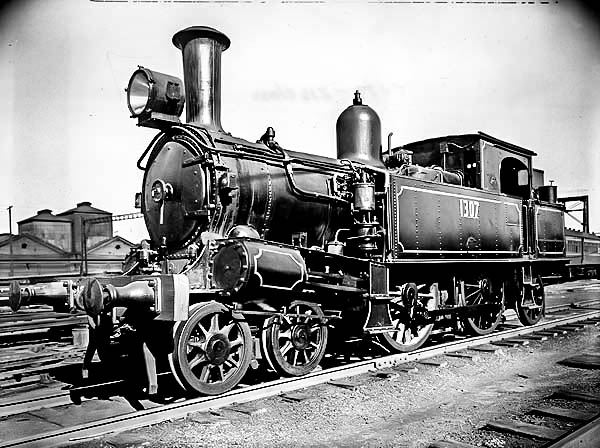
Z13 class locomotive

Due to a shortage of suburban engines in the Sydney area and the availability of surplus C79 class tender engines, it was decided to experimentally convert one of the tender locomotives to a tank type engine in 1896. The conversion proved successful and twenty had been converted at Eveleigh Railway Workshops by 1902. In 1924, the class was renumbered becoming the Z13 class.

Following the delivery of C30 class locomotives from 1903, they were transferred to Newcastle suburban traffic and when replaced there, were allocated minor roles such as working the Carlingford, Morpeth and Warren branches. Two were sold to East Greta Mining & Railway Company, one to Ashtonfields Colliery, Thornton and a fourth scrapped.

In later years, their main duties were working of the Ballina branch, the Picton-Mittagong Loop line, the Yass Town branch and school trains on the upper North Coast.

==== C30 Class ====
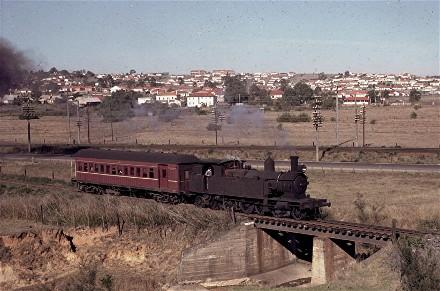
C30 class locomotive

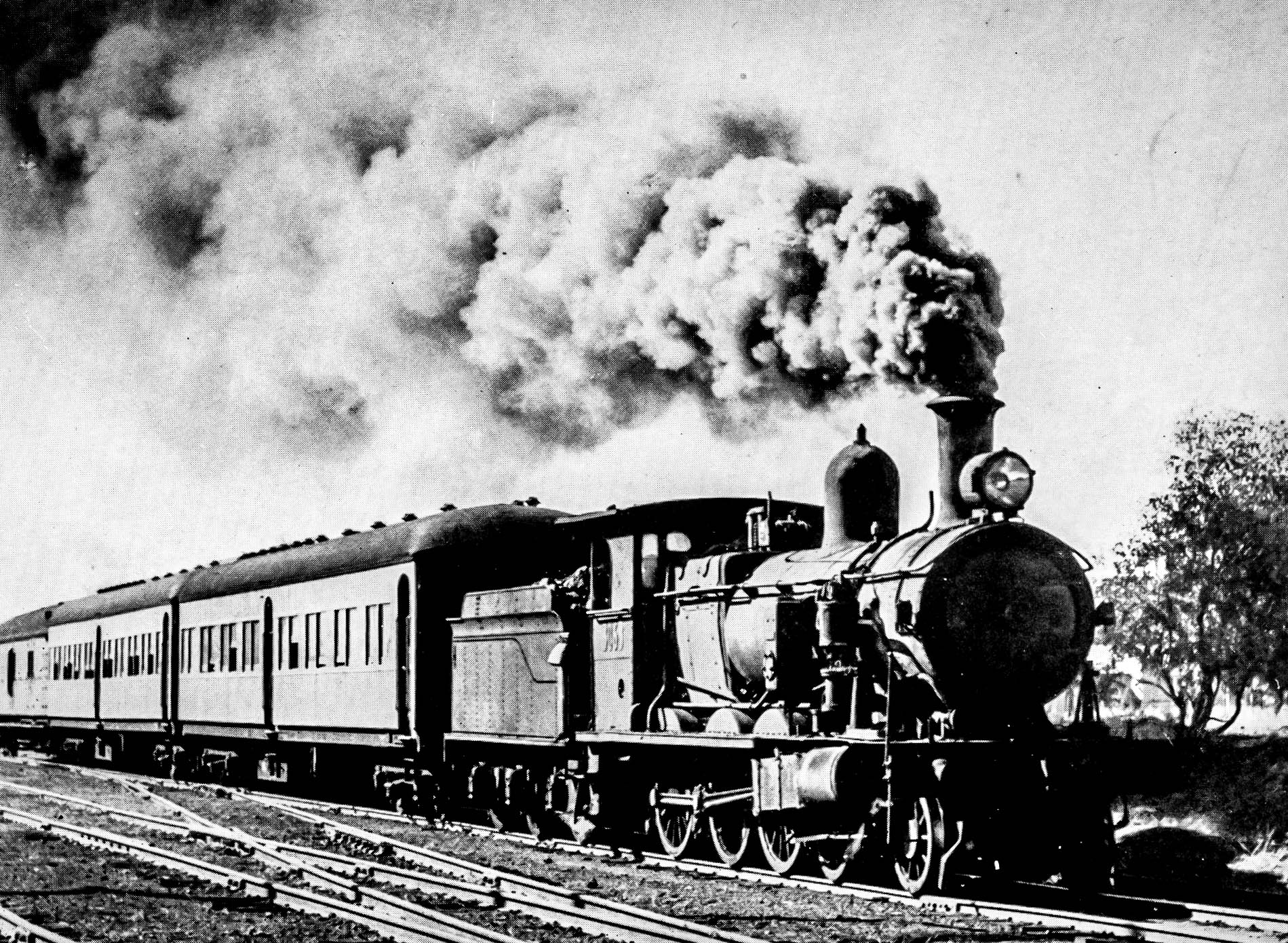
C30T class locomotive

The first batch of 35 locomotives were built Beyer, Peacock & Company entering service in 1903/04. Between 1905 and 1917 Beyer, Peacock built a further 60 engines while the New South Wales Government Railways built 50 at their Eveleigh Railway Workshops.

The electrification of the inner suburban lines resulted in a surplus of the class too valuable to scrap. Accordingly, between August 1928 and July 1933, 77 of these locomotives were converted to C30T tender 4-6-0 type locomotives by Clyde Engineering and Eveleigh Railway Workshops to replace older locomotives on country branch lines.

The remaining tank locomotives were mostly employed on Sydney suburban services to Cowan, Penrith and Campbelltown as well as branches to Carlingford, Richmond and Camden. They were also used on suburban services in Newcastle and Wollongong.

A few drifted to the country areas, working on sections where no turntable was readily available, such as Casino to Border Loop on the North Coast line, Leeton and Merriwa and shunting at yards such as Bathurst. The daily passenger trains on the extremely steep Unanderra to Moss Vale line were operated by 30 class locomotives until February 1967.

Following the electrification of the country platforms at Sydney Central station, the 30 class replaced the 26 class locomotives used to shunt carriages in the yard, they being not so dangerous to water under the traction wiring.

The first was withdrawn in February 1957, by July 1965 the fleet was down to 33 and by mid-1971 down to three. The last, 3085, was withdrawn on 22 February 1973. It was the second last steam locomotive in service on the NSWGR.

=== Single-deck cars ===
1877 American Suburban carriages

Main article: New South Wales American Suburban carriage stock

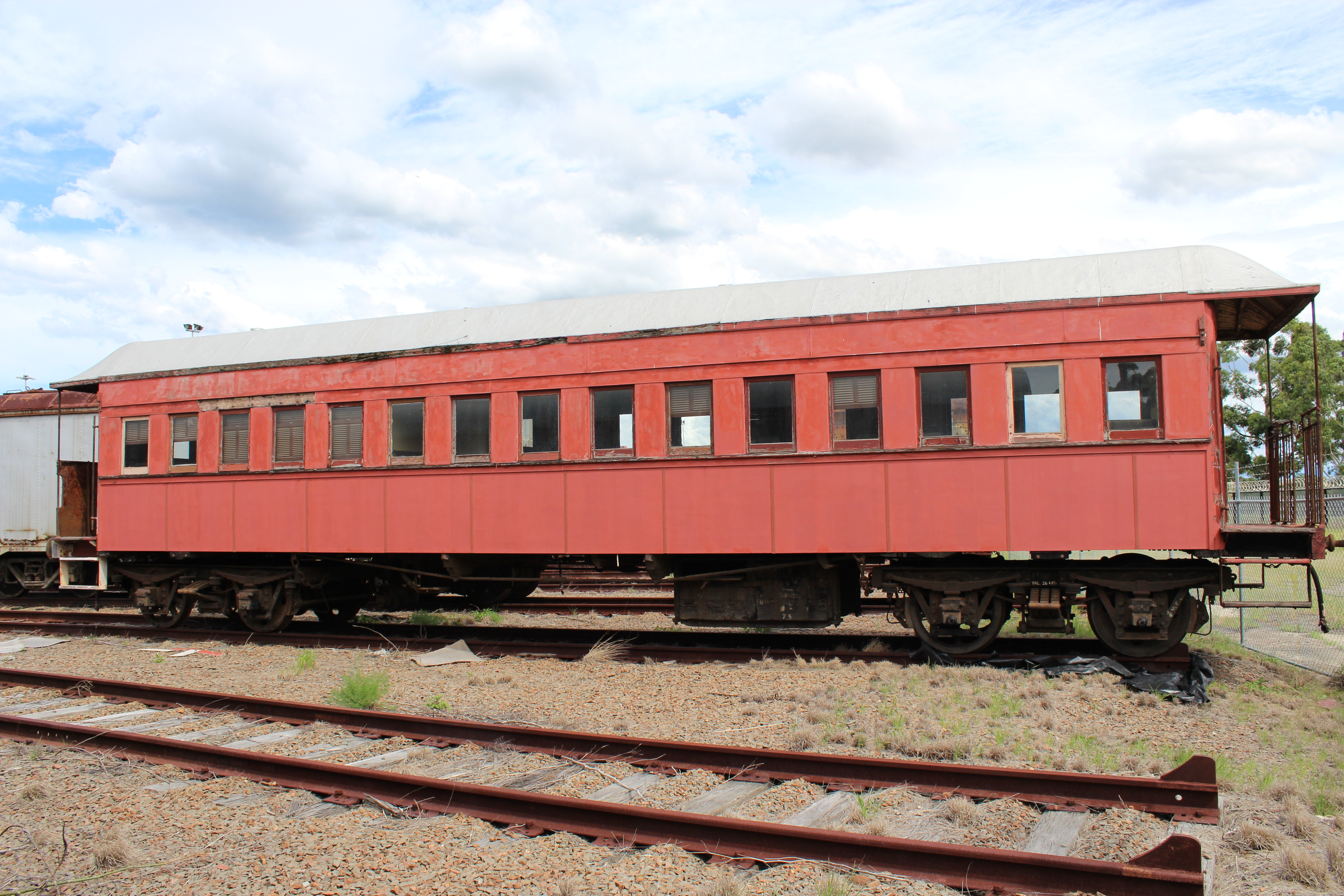
An end platform car of an American Suburban carriage stock stored at Broadmeadow Loco Depot.

The American Suburban Carriage were built between 1877 and 1912 by a number of manufacturers with timber frames and truss sided body work. Due to the truss bodywork, it was difficult to cut doors in the sides of the body so doors at either end of the cars were provided with covered platforms to allow access to the carriages. They became the most numerous group of carriages built for any Australian railway system with a total of 659 carriages built. A further 196 carriages, known as Lucy Suburban Carriages were constructed between 1913 and 1916 but had steel under frames and separate bodywork. While they retained the general layout and appearance of the American Suburban Carriage, they were generally not referred to as such and 193 were later completely rebuilt for use in Electric train stock in the 1920s.

The American Suburban carriages were built primarily as suburban passenger carriages for the Sydney network. Following the electrification of the Sydney network in the 1920s and 1930s, most carriages were converted for use on longer distance services, whilst others were transferred to Newcastle and Wollongong for continued suburban service or to country branch lines. The last examples were withdrawn in the mid-1970s.

In the 1920s, 193 cars were rebuilt into 184 electric trailer cars (T4101–4284) and nine driving trailer cars (D4001 to 4009). They were in service much longer than intended, being finally replaced by the Tulloch single deck, and later double-deck, trailers from the 1950s onwards. D4001 and 4006 were converted to Parcel Vans driving trailers. T4279 is preserved and has been used on many railfan single-deck tours in the 1980s and early 1990s. D4004 is also preserved awaiting restoration, but not operable.

A number of the non converted American Suburban carriages have been preserved. Examples are owned by the Canberra Railway Museum, Dorrigo Steam Railway & Museum, Lachlan Valley Railway and NSW Rail Museum.

==== 1920s Wooden Bradfield motor carriages ====
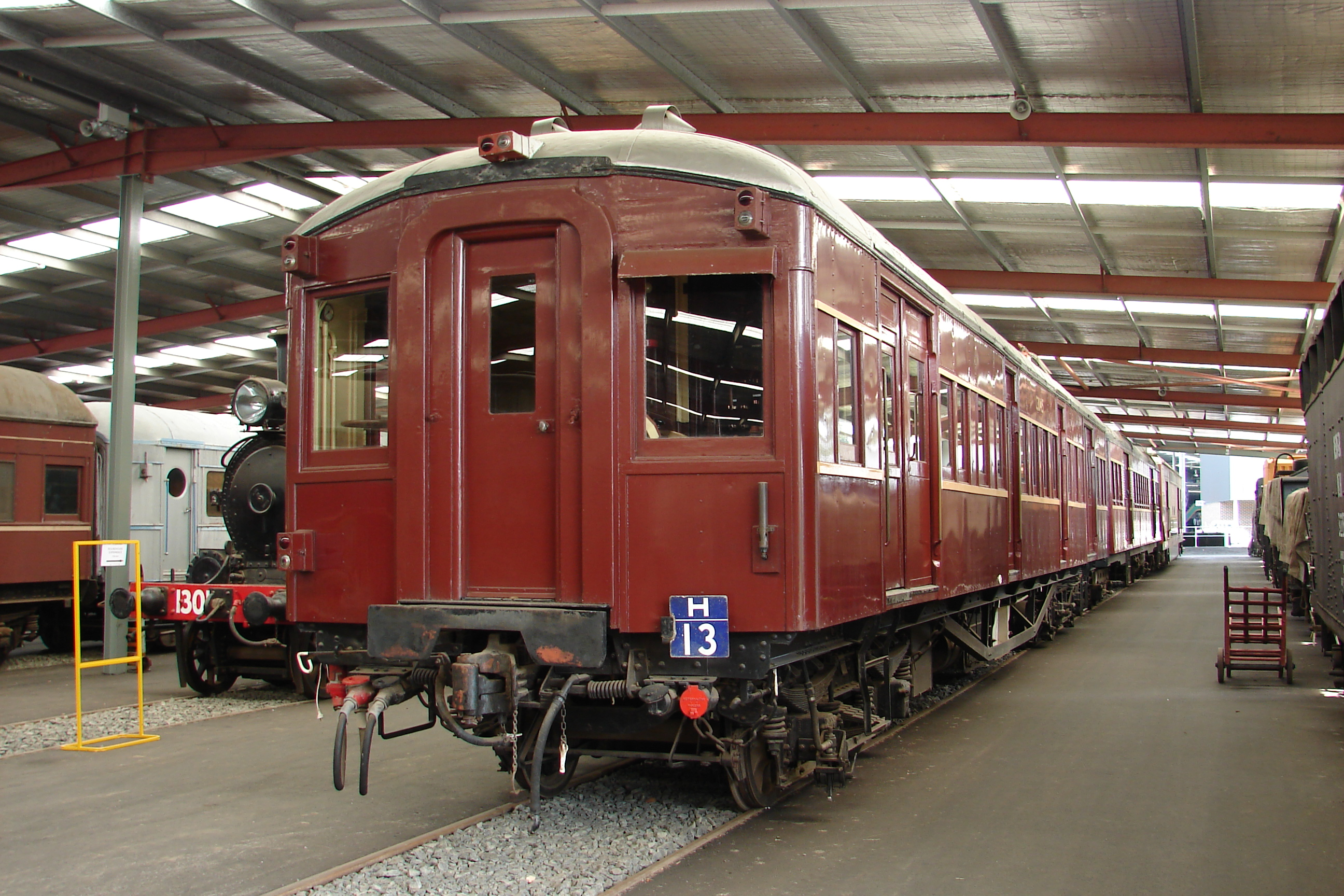
Preserved carriage C3045 at the New South Wales Rail Transport Museum in 2010

In the 1920s, the Bradfield electrification program began. Until then, trains continued to be sets of steam-locomotive-hauled wooden end-platform cars. In 1921, 101 wooden bodied driving-motor cars (later numbered C3000–C3100) were built by Ritchie Brothers and Meadowbank Manufacturing Company C3045 (now preserved) was built by the railway workshops as a prototype, but became the very last to enter traffic in 1923. They were originally steam-hauled EBB/EFA cars, prior to conversion to electric traction with the opening of the first section of electrified line between Sydney and Oatley in 1926. These wooden cars had steel sheathing for additional strength, and became known as the "Bradfield" cars after John Bradfield, although they were designed by Edward Lucy.

Some Bradfield cars were converted to parcel vans after accidents. Other Bradfield cars were rebuilt to resemble Standard suburban (1927-type) cars in the 1960s, to prolong their lives until new double-deck cars could be delivered to replace them. The last Bradfield power-cars were withdrawn from service in 1975. C3045 is preserved static at the NSW Rail Museum, Thirlmere, while C3082 has been retained by RailCorp. C3082, the former Elcar "Pilot" Shunter, was used on a number of single-deck railfan tours in the 1980s, often with Wooden trailer car T4279.

==== 1925 Standard suburban carriages ====
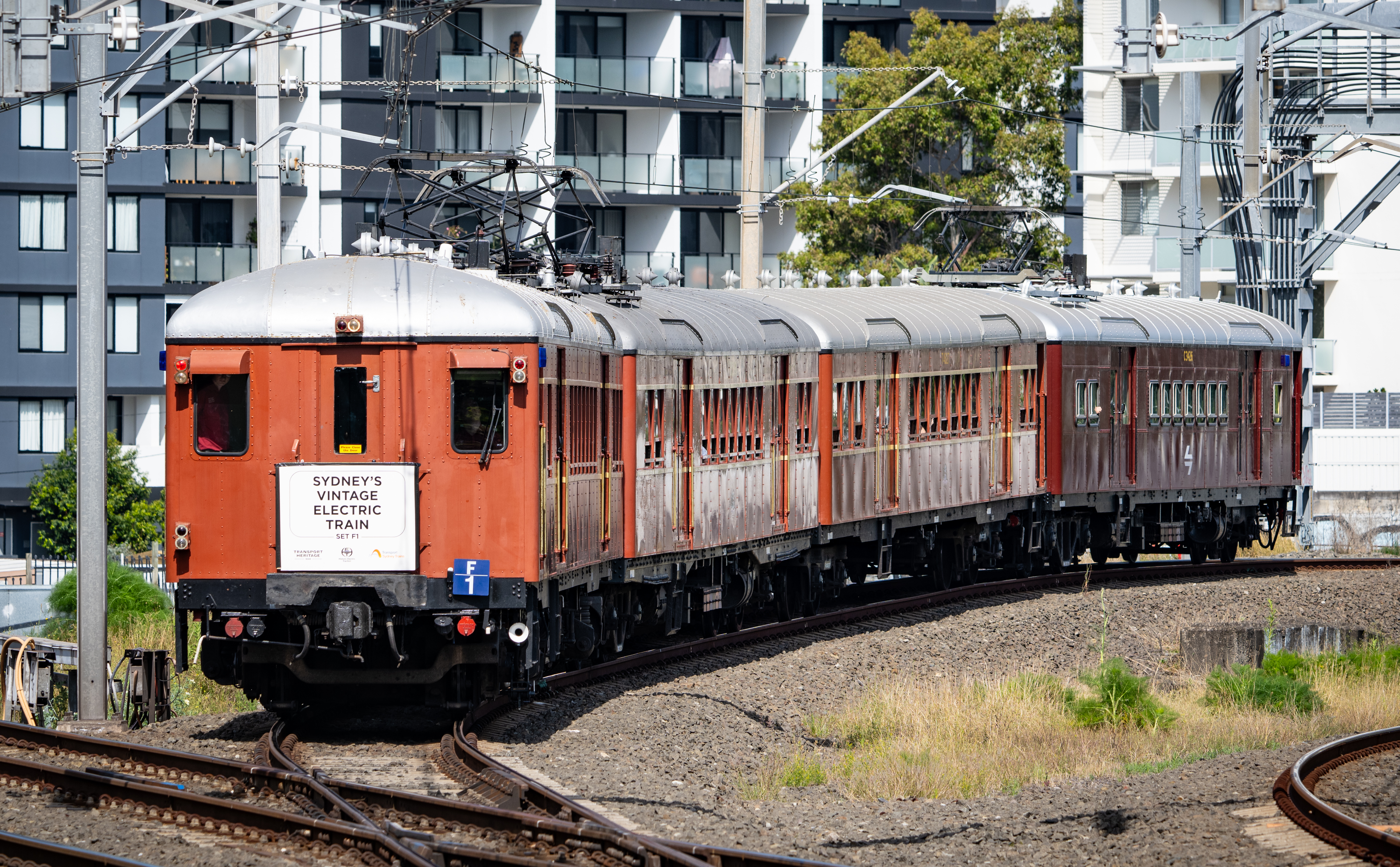
Heritage set "F1" at Wolli Creek in 2023

With the planned opening of the Sydney underground lines and electrification, it was proposed to build steel bodied suburban cars. As no such cars were built in Australia before, an initial 50 cars (numbered 3101–3150) were built by the Leeds Forge Company in England and assembled at Eveleigh Carriage Workshops and Clyde Engineering between April and October 1925. Initially numbered 2213–2262, they entered service being inserted into sets with wooden motor carriages for haulage by steam locomotives until fitted with Metropolitan-Vickers electrical equipment and motors in 1926. At this stage they were renumbered C3101 to C3150.

==== 1926–1960 Tulloch and Sputnik carriages ====
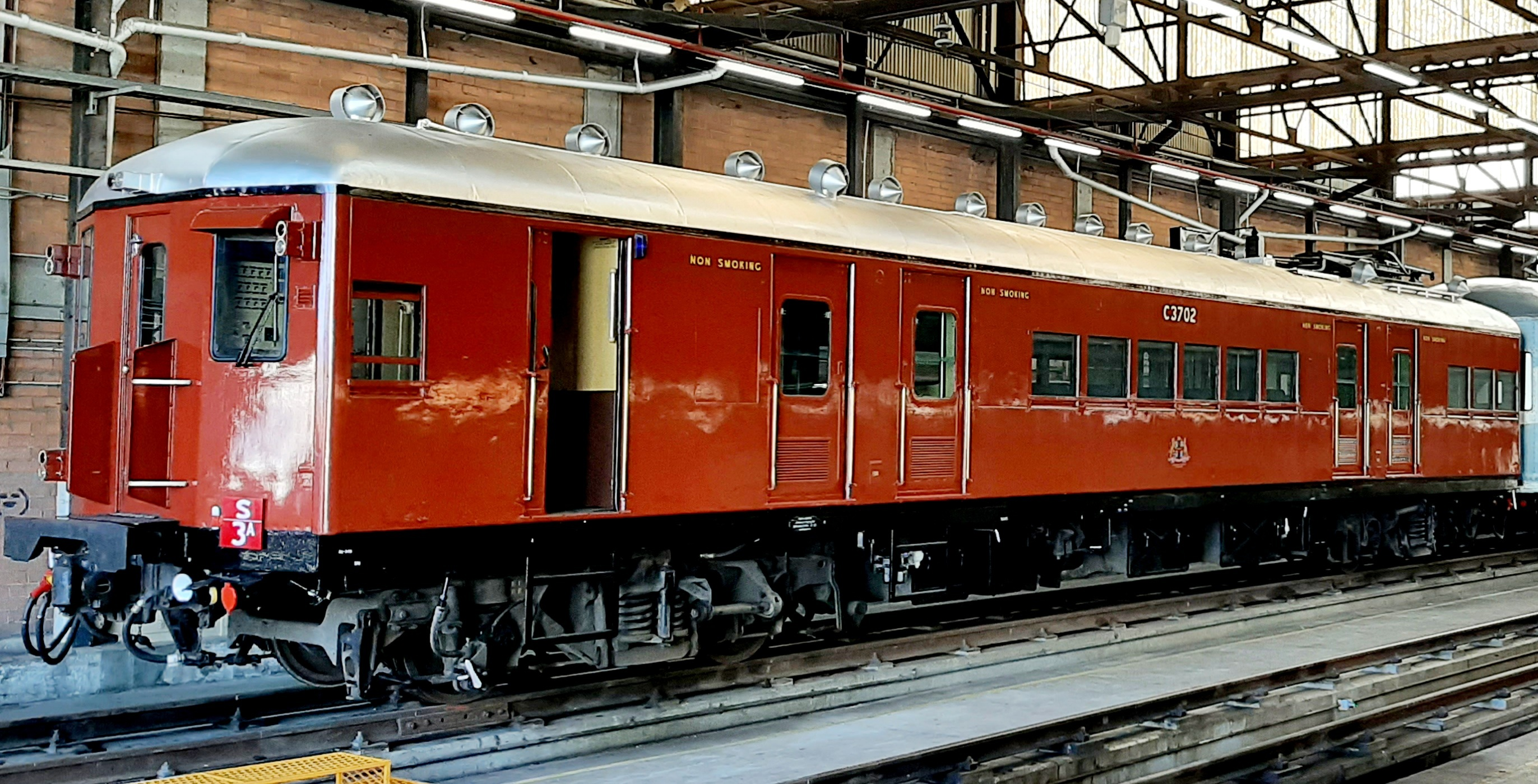
Heritage set W3 at Flemington

Between 1926 and 1960, a total of 417 motor cars and 417 trailer cars were built by various contractors including Leeds Forge Company, Walsh Island Dockyard, Clyde Engineering, Tulloch Limited and Comeng. The pre-war "1927 type" cars were known as the "Standard" cars as they dominated the suburban fleet, and featured First and Second Class travel until 1 January 1940. More cars (the majority being trailer cars), were delivered by Tulloch Limited between 1940 and 1957 to cater for system expansion, and to replace many of the decrepit Wooden trailer cars. The 80 cars built by Comeng from 1957 to 1960 (40 motor and 40 trailer cars) became known as the Sputnik cars. They had 4 single power operated doors on each side and were of spot-welded construction. These cars were introduced at the time of electrification extension from Parramatta to Penrith. One 8-car set of Tulloch cars was fitted with power-doors and ran from 1956 to 1976 as set F39. Between 1968 & 1973, 97 Standard & Tulloch motor-cars were converted from two to four motors on new air-ride bogies for better performance and adhesion, starting with C7500 (ex C3500). These single deck electric multiple unit (EMU) sets were the backbone of the Sydney suburban network until the stainless-steel double deck cars of the S (and later C, K & R) sets took over. The last of the Sputniks had their final retirement in 1993. Many cars were painted blue & white during the PTC years from 1972 onwards, and the last blue & white cars were repainted in 1987. Several cars were fitted with Beclawat sliding windows during overhauls as a cost-cutting measure (see photo). After 1976, they carried a deep 'Indian Red' livery until their retirement. In 1991, one eight-car set H22 was painted in a special livery to promote Taronga Zoo. Two power-door W-sets were painted in special liveries for the Zoo (W1) and to mark Sydney's Sesquicentenary (W2). Many of the motor cars were marshalled with the Tulloch double deck trailer cars (see below) to form 4 or 8 car mixed single and double deck sets. In their final years, these cars became associated with the term 'red rattlers' by the State Government and the media, due to the way the windows and window shutters rattled in their frames. On 10 June 2016, Preserved cars C7396, T4527, C3218 and C3426 were returned to operational status by Sydney Trains in conjunction with Historic Electric Traction. This train set, now known as Red Set F1, operates occasional special passenger trips through Transport Heritage NSW. At 90 years of age, Set F1 is now among the oldest fully operating electric train sets in the world.

=== Double-deck cars ===
==== 1964 Tulloch double-deck passenger carriages (1964–2004) ====
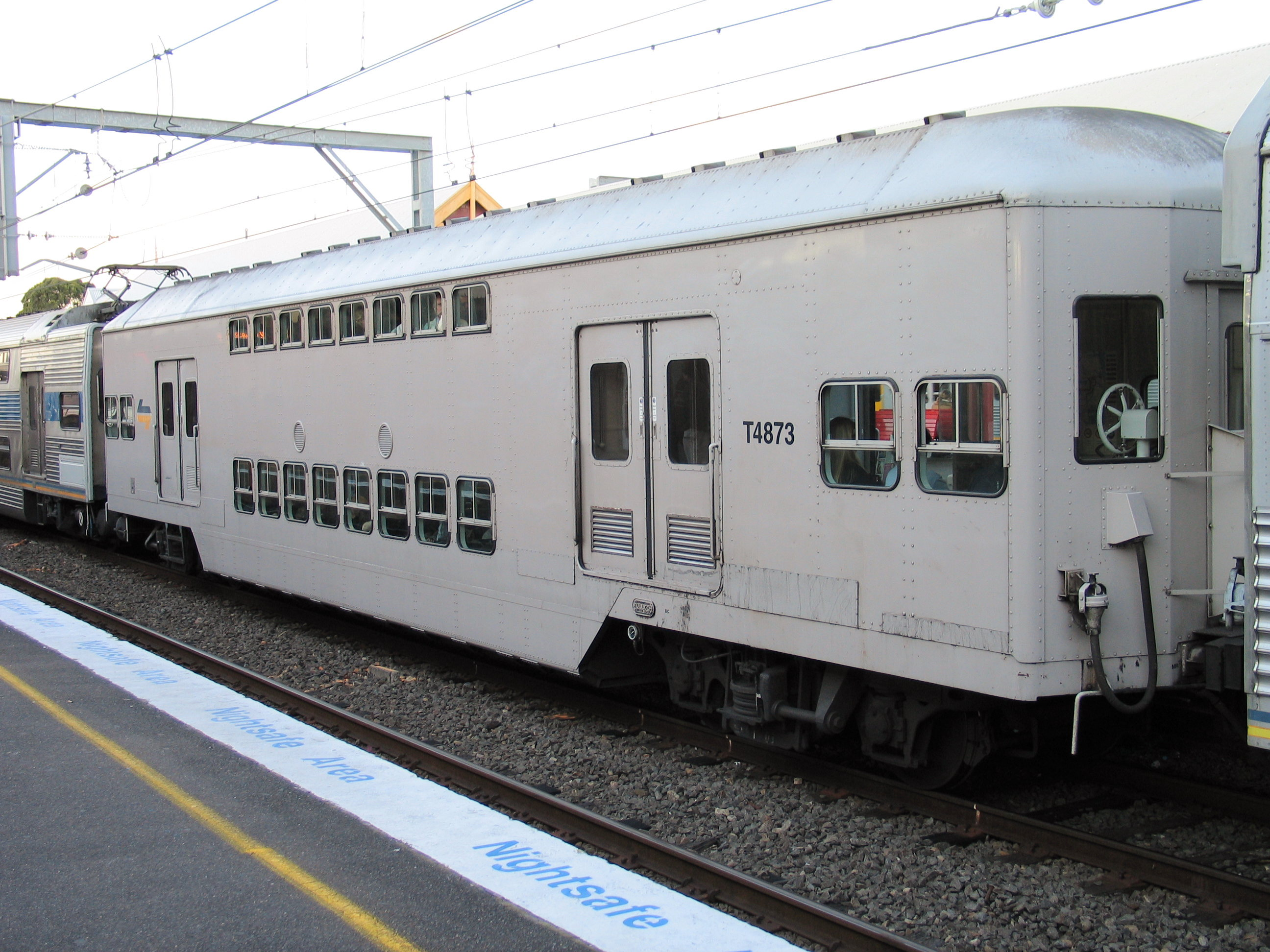
Tulloch trailer car T4873 forming part of an S set

In the 1960s, tenders were called for double-deck electric passenger cars. In 1964, the first of 120 Tulloch trailers were delivered, and integrated into the single-deck sets. The cars were built by Tulloch Limited, and were numbered 4801–4920, by operating across only the City Circle, South, Bankstown, East Hills and Inner West Lines (Sector 2). They consisted of normal floor level over the bogies, with a double deck passenger section between the bogies. The cars were largely riveted aluminium, with steel underframes. They carried green internal livery and were painted Tuscan Red on the outside sides with painted silver roofs to match the single deck carriages. For the first time in Sydney, fluorescent internal lighting and air suspension bogies were used. The initial 40 cars were used in power door sets, the remainder in non-powered door sets, and they replaced the remaining wooden bodied trailer cars. In 1987, W-set trailers T4834–4838 were converted to manual door M-set cars by having their power-doors disconnected, and rewired from 120- to 32-volt operation. The Tullochs were painted in the colour scheme of the day (blue & white and later deep Indian red). Cars T4839 to 4895 were later painted grey and marshalled into sets containing Comeng & Goninan double-deck cars (see below) as 'R & S sets'. Cars T4834–4838 and 4896–4920 continued to operate with older single-deck motor cars as 'M Sets'. The W set trailers (T4801–4833) and M set trailers (T4834–4838 and 4896–4920) were withdrawn in 1994 with the retirement of all single deck suburban stock, the cars marshalled with Comeng power cars in W sets saw service until March 2004, before the introduction of the Millennium Trains. Cars 4801, 4814, 4816, 4823, 4840, 4844, 4857, 4874 and 4881 have been kept for preservation.

==== 1968 Tulloch double-deck power carriages (1968–1980) ====
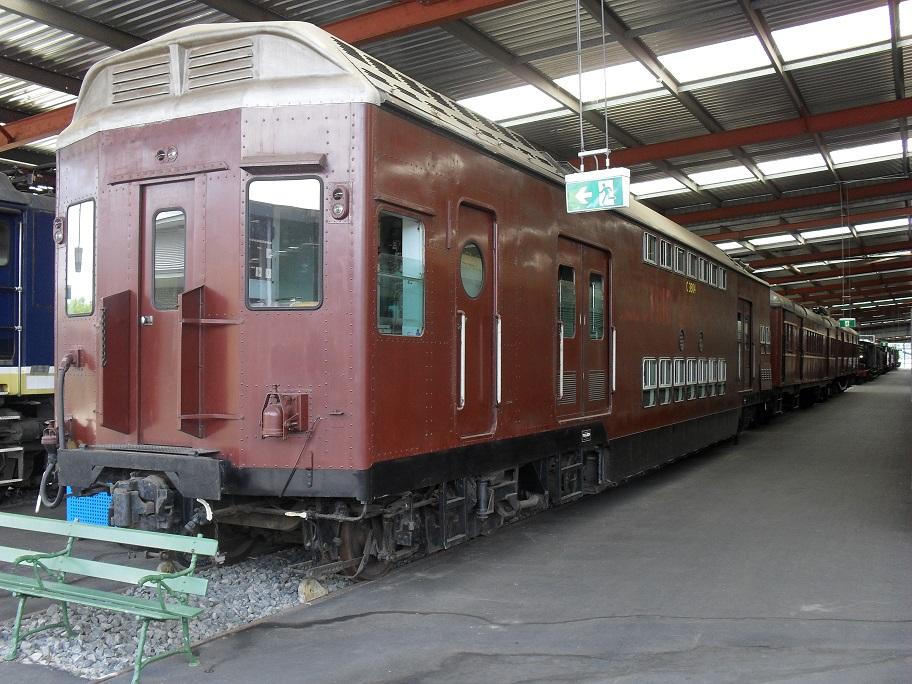
Prototype double-deck power car C3804

In 1966, after the success of the Tulloch double-deck trailers, tenders were called for double deck motor cars. In 1968, four experimental double-deck motor cars (C3801–3804) were built by Tulloch and entered service enabling the first eight-car double-deck train, set S10, to operate by marshalling them with four Tulloch trailers T4839, 4840, 4843 and 4844. These were the second double-deck Electric Multiple Unit passenger trains in the world after the 4DD stock on the Southern Railway in London, that had seating on both the upper and the lower level.

Each power-car carried electrical equipment from different manufacturers for evaluation purposes: C3801 (Mitsubishi), 3802 (Toshiba), 3803 (Hitachi) and 3804 (English Electric). Set S10 proved unreliable and the single-deck "Sputnik" C3701-series power-cars often deputised for Tulloch power cars out of service. In 1977, it was decided to disband the set to convert them to trailers. C3801 was converted to T4797 in 1980 and C3803 became T4799 in 1982. Conversion of C3802 to T4798 was started at Elcar Workshops, but never finished and it was later scrapped. C3804 is now preserved at the NSW Rail Museum, Thirlmere. It was withdrawn from service on 4 January 1980.

These trailers operated on the:

- South Line – City Circle to Macarthur via Granville
- Inner West Line – City Circle to Liverpool via Regents Park
- Bankstown Line – City Circle to Liverpool via Bankstown
- East Hills Line – City Circle to Macarthur via Sydenham (then via the Airport Line in 2000–2003)

==== 1972 S set power carriages (Comeng) ====
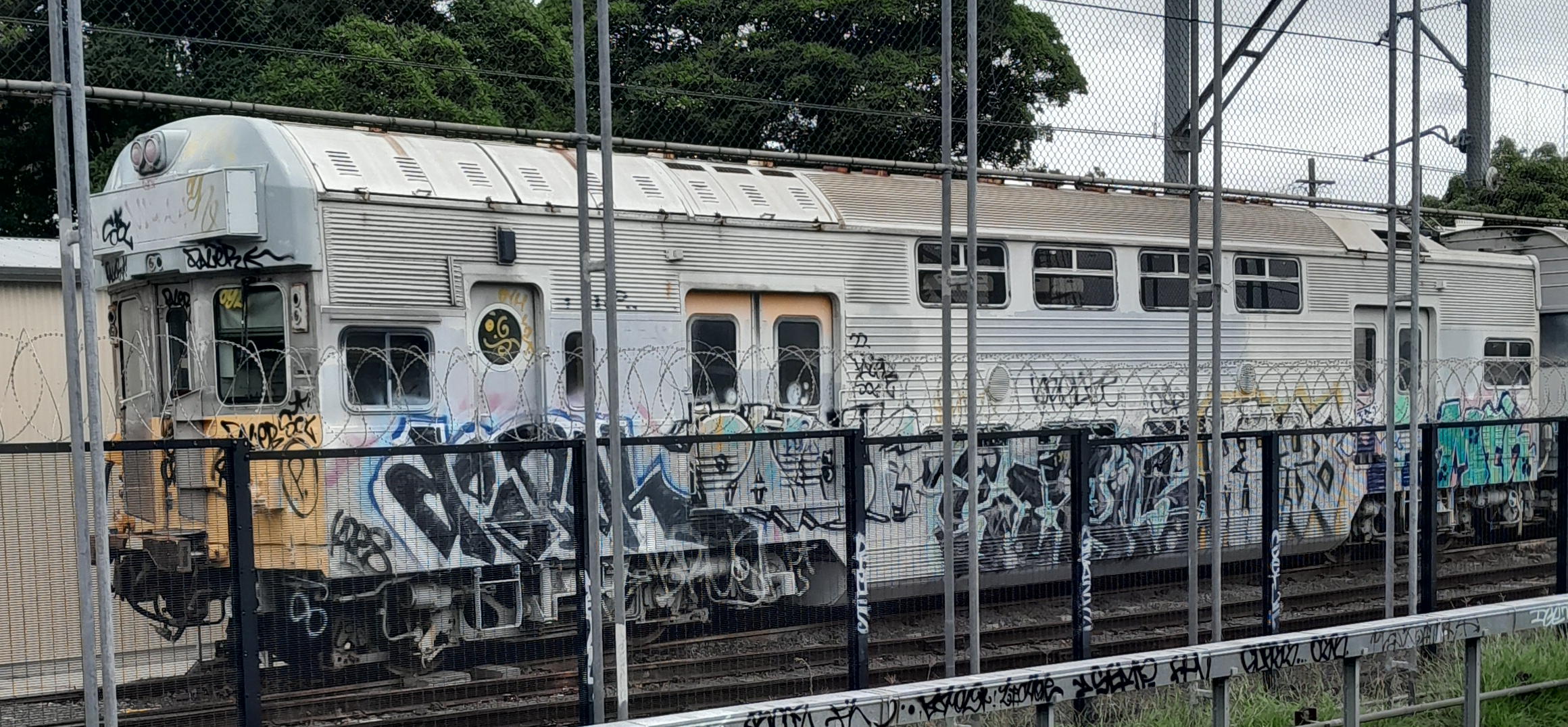
Series 1 Comeng S set power car C3840 at Petersham, 2025

In 1972, the first Comeng-constructed stainless steel double deck power-cars entered service. These cars (C3805–3857) were loosely based on the recently introduced inter-urban cars, the V set. Their stainless-steel bodies were painted the standard "Tuscan red" to match the livery of the existing fleet. Cars C3844–3857 were delivered in the blue and white livery of the Public Transport Commission in the 1970s, and repainted to deep Indian red after 1976, before being paint-stripped to run in their original stainless steel finish in the early 1980s. They were initially marshalled into sets (from S11 onwards) with Tulloch trailers T4841, 4842, and 4845 to 4895, which had their passenger doors modified from manual to power operation. Internally, they had reversible seating with a light-tan upholstery, and a grey and off-white internal livery. Beclawat sliding windows were fitted to the upper and lower decks, with drop windows in the doors. The sliding windows were replaced with Hopper windows in the 1990s and internally they were repainted light grey with blue upholstered seating. These motor cars had tapered ends, which were fitted with destination boards in the 1990s. With the introduction of the Millennium Trains in 2002, several early Comeng power-cars were converted to non-driving trailers, with their pantographs removed, and renumbered T4701–4723.

==== 1973 S set power and passenger carriages (Comeng) ====
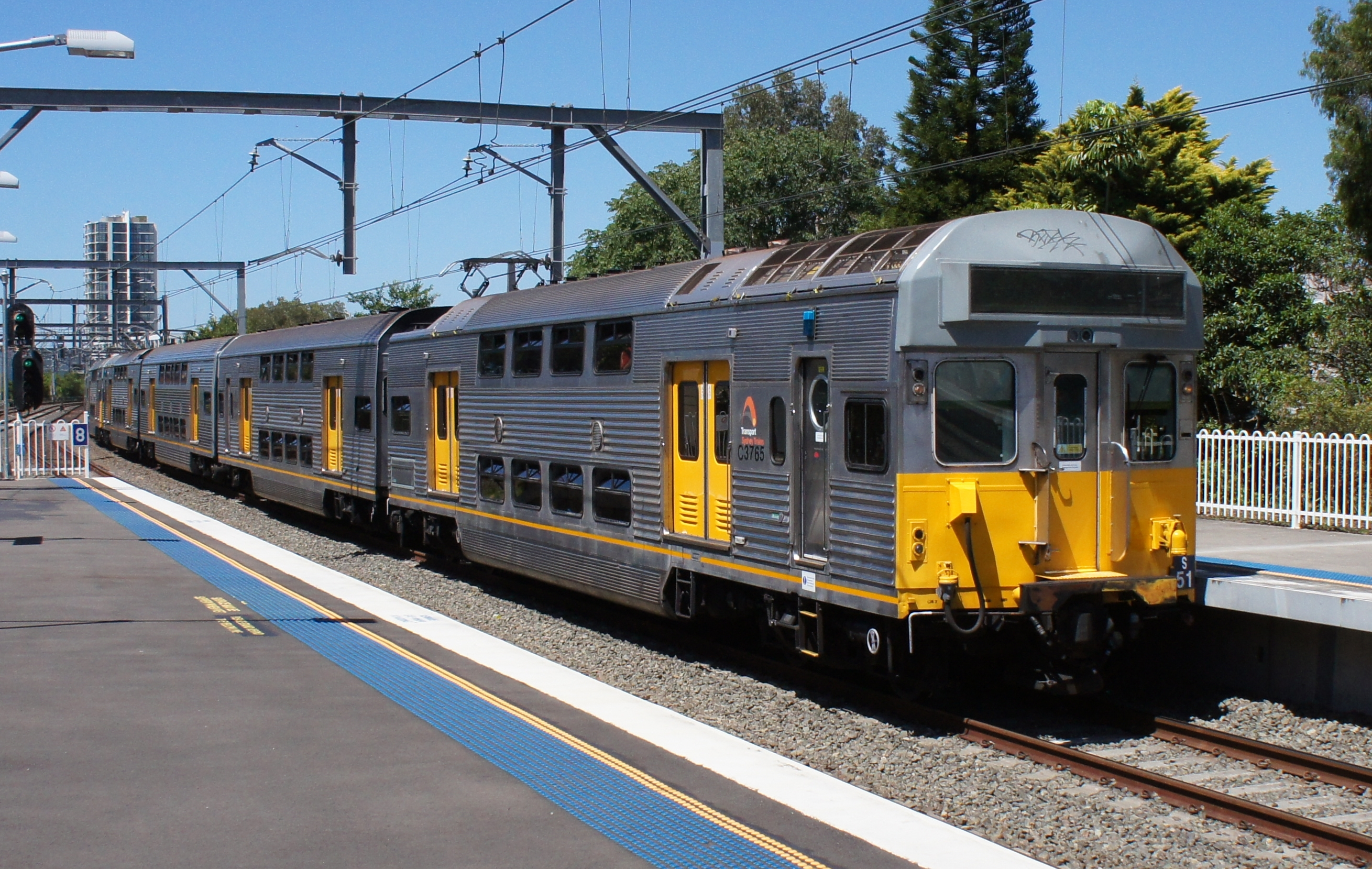
A Comeng-built S set led by power car C3765

In 1973, additional 54 Comeng power cars C3858–3911, and 56 Comeng trailer cars T4921–4962, were ordered to coincide with the opening of the Eastern suburbs railway line. These trailer cars were the first to be of stainless steel construction, and they had an extra row of seats on the top deck (and are thus distinguished by an extra single window at the centre of the car on both decks). Ten driving trailers D4011–4020 were built with small driver's compartments for 2-car trains. However, they never saw service as driving cars due to Union bans. Subsequently, 25 driving trailer cars D4021–4045 (with large guard's compartments) were also built to be paired with a driving motor car to allow 2-car sets to be operated. Ten driving trailers were diesel hauled on South Coast suburban services, south of Thirroul, prior to electrification. Ten driving trailers, renumbered D4001–4010, were used for two car shuttles in the initial period after the electrification of the Richmond line. These driving trailer cars subsequently had their driving equipment removed and were converted into standard non-driving trailer cars. Extended orders saw the Comeng double-deck fleet expanded to include power-cars C3912–3986 & 3741–3765, trailers T4963–4987 and driving trailers D4046–4095 by 1982. By 1976, one quarter of suburban cars were double deck. All the 1973 cars are now integrated with earlier stock and operate as L, R & S Sets. With the introduction of the Millennium Trains in 2002, several early Comeng power-cars were converted to non-driving trailers, with their pantographs removed, and renumbered T4701–4723.

==== 1978 S sets (Goninan) ====
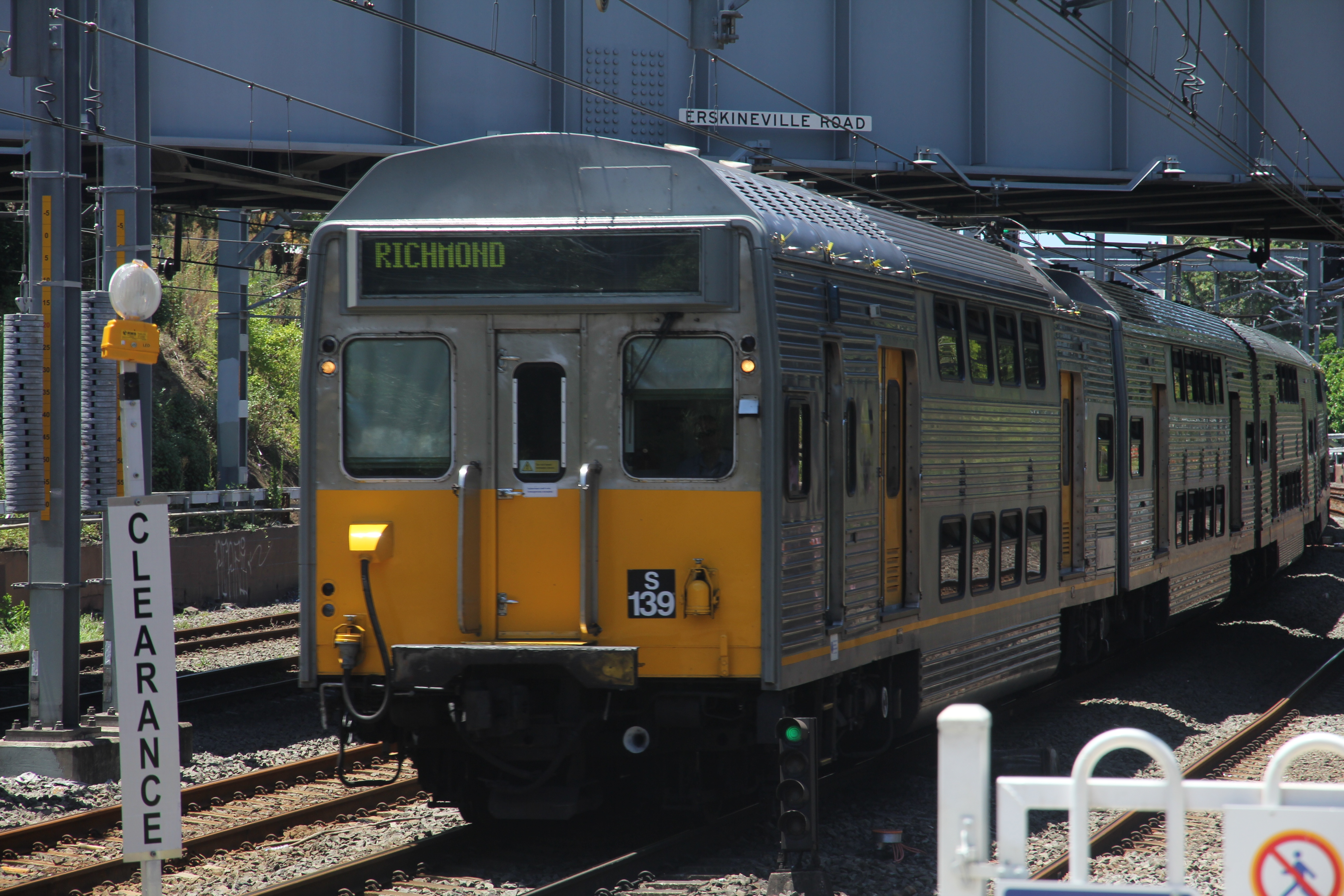
A Goninan & Co-built S set

In the 1970s, A Goninan & Co in Newcastle entered the passenger car construction market building 80 power cars C3001–3080 and 70 trailer cars T4101–4170. Unlike the Comeng cars, the power cars had a flat front end and Pullman Standard fluting, and the upper deck passenger windows were set significantly lower than the earlier Comeng cars reducing passenger sight lines (a source of complaint from passengers). When the Eastern Suburbs Railway was opened in 1979, only stainless-steel Comeng or Goninan double deck cars were meant to operate on this line, but the painted Tulloch double-deck trailers were also used. In 1981, a brand new four-car Goninan set conveyed Queen Elizabeth II from Bankstown (which was declared a City by the Queen) to Martin Place. For this occasion the train was specially fitted out with carpets and other refinements. The set was targeted "R1" for the occasion. These cars continue to operate in 2007 as L, R and S sets. They were the last non-air conditioned passenger trains in service in Sydney.

Two thirds of pre-1981 non-air conditioned rolling stock were withdrawn from service with the roll-out of 626 new A set Waratah carriages (78 sets) from 2012 to June 2014. The final sets were scheduled to be withdrawn from service by 2015 but some sets were retained for the South West Rail link since no newer rollingstock or additional Waratah trains had been ordered. In December 2016, the NSW Government announced a plan to introduce 192 new Waratah carriages also known as the Sydney Trains B sets. These have replaced the remaining non-airconditioned S set trains by the end of June 2019.

==== 1986 C sets ====
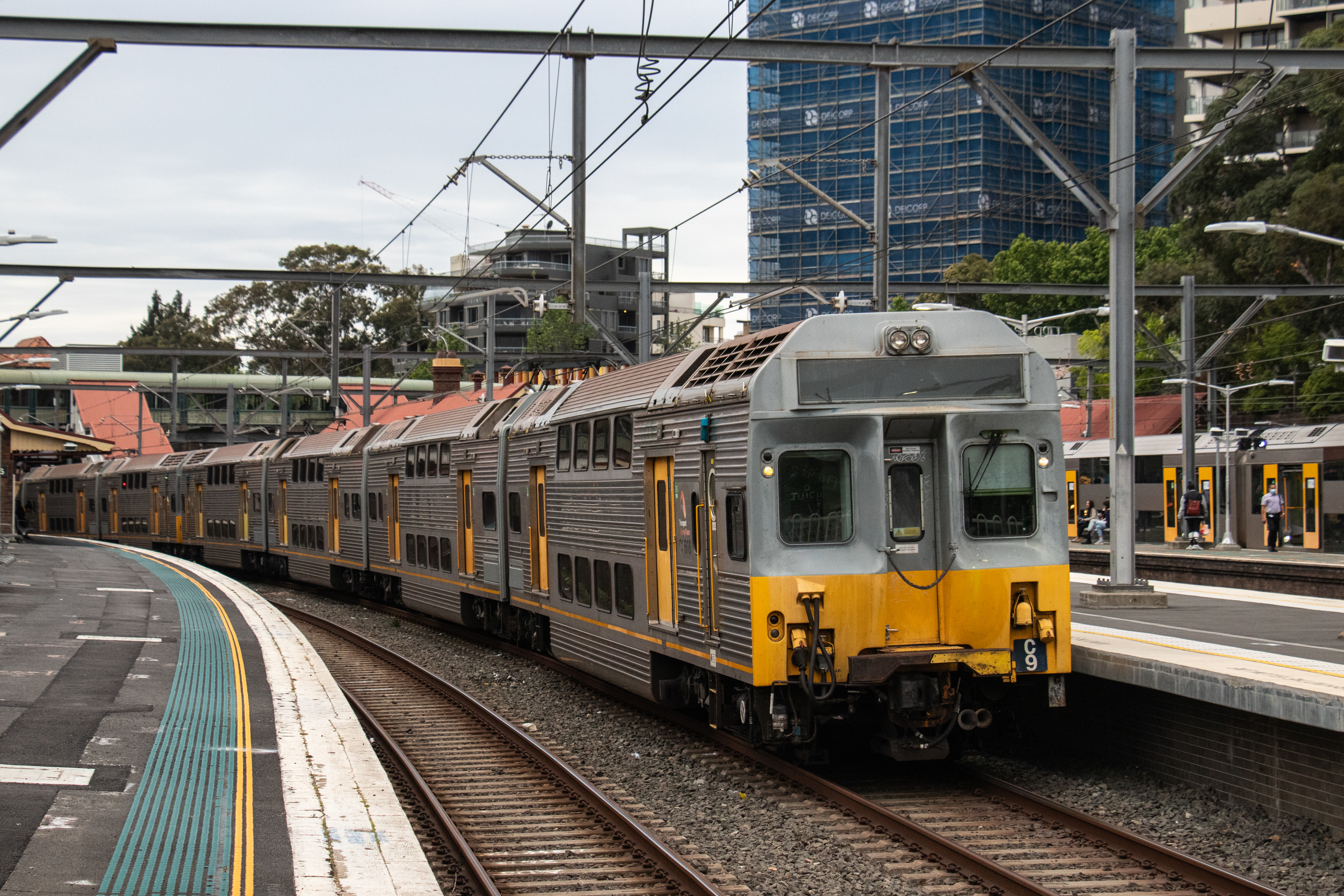
A C set at Redfern station

In 1986, a new generation of advanced suburban passenger train was being considered by the State Rail Authority. There was a delay in the construction of these trains, and 56 interim stainless steel air conditioned cars, C3581–3608 and T4247–4274, were built by Goninan, known as the 'Chopper Cars' for their chopper control. These cars trialled several features of the next generation cars, such as fixed seating, door chimes and passenger address systems. They were originally fitted with a push-button feature, to enable passengers to open the doors manually, but this feature was short-lived. They retained the flat ends of the previous Goninan cars, but with the addition of a fibreglass moulded end piece which was originally white with orange and red stripes (the 'candy' State Rail livery). These ends were later painted grey with a lower yellow section which they retain to this day, and internally the standard grey livery and blue seat upholstery was applied. These cars were initially branded as a continuation of the K Sets, but were incompatible due to the camshaft controls fitted to the existing fleet. Often, the sets would ‘jerk’ while accelerating when coupled together. These cars were later rebranded as C sets, to differentiate them from K Sets.

They continued to operate until the second batch of Series 2 Waratah B Sets started entering service from late 2020. The last train was withdrawn on 26 February 2021, after operating its last revenue run on 90-W from the City to Liverpool via Bankstown. A farewell tour took place on 6 March, organised by the Sydney Electric Train Society (SETS). The train operated up the Blue Mountains to Mount Victoria and made a trip to both Hornsby and Fairfield. Initially, no sets were to be preserved due to the small fleet, however, SETS will preserve one 4-car set as of July 2021. This set has been confirmed to be formed of cars C3584, T4266 (both from set C5), T4274 and C3608 (both from set C9). C3608 and T4274 are significant for being the final stainless steel power and trailer cars respectively built for the Sydney network.

=== 1981 K sets ===
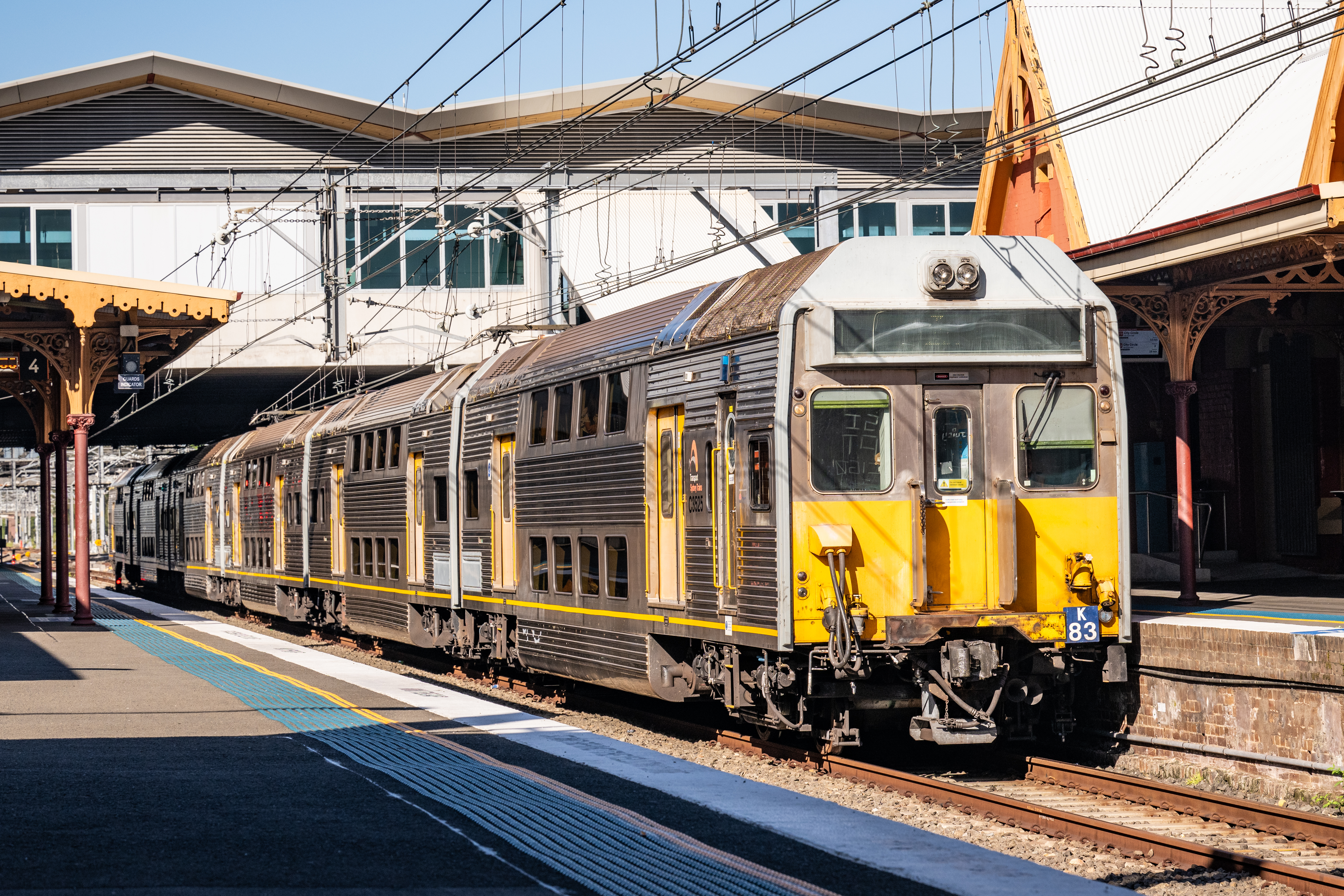
A K set at Sydenham station

In 1981, Goninan built the first air-conditioned cars for the Sydney suburban network. Until then, Sydney had lagged somewhat behind other cities that had commenced the introduction of air-conditioned stock. In order to fit the air-conditioning equipment into the motor cars, the pantographs were moved to the trailers, effectively meaning that a motor car must remain semi-permanently coupled to a trailer car. Four driving trailer cars D4096–4099 were also ordered, allowing 2-car sets to be operated with power cars C3501–3504. The first 8-car set (R1) was delivered with air-conditioning, followed by 90 forced ventilation cars C3505–3549 & T4171–4215, during the delivery process for this order, C3550 and T4216 were delivered, fully fitted with air-conditioning.

Following this, the next order, numbered from C3551 and T4217, were also fitted with forced-air ventilation, and were the first to be fitted with air-conditioning. The first 100 cars had their upper deck windows at the unpopular lower height of the earlier Goninan cars, the final 60 were modified and these final 60 were distinguished by their front end being painted into the 'candy' white, orange and red State Rail livery of the time. The final batch (C3551-3580 & T4217-4246) also featured bright yellow internal walls. The forced ventilation cars were later retrofitted with air-conditioning, and the Beclawat sliding windows replaced by fixed panes in the late 1990s. Also at this time, the standard light grey internal livery was adopted, and the seats were replaced with blue upholstery. 160 of these cars were delivered until 1985, and continue to operate in 2011 as K sets.

== Current suburban passenger rolling stock ==
=== T set (Tangara) ===
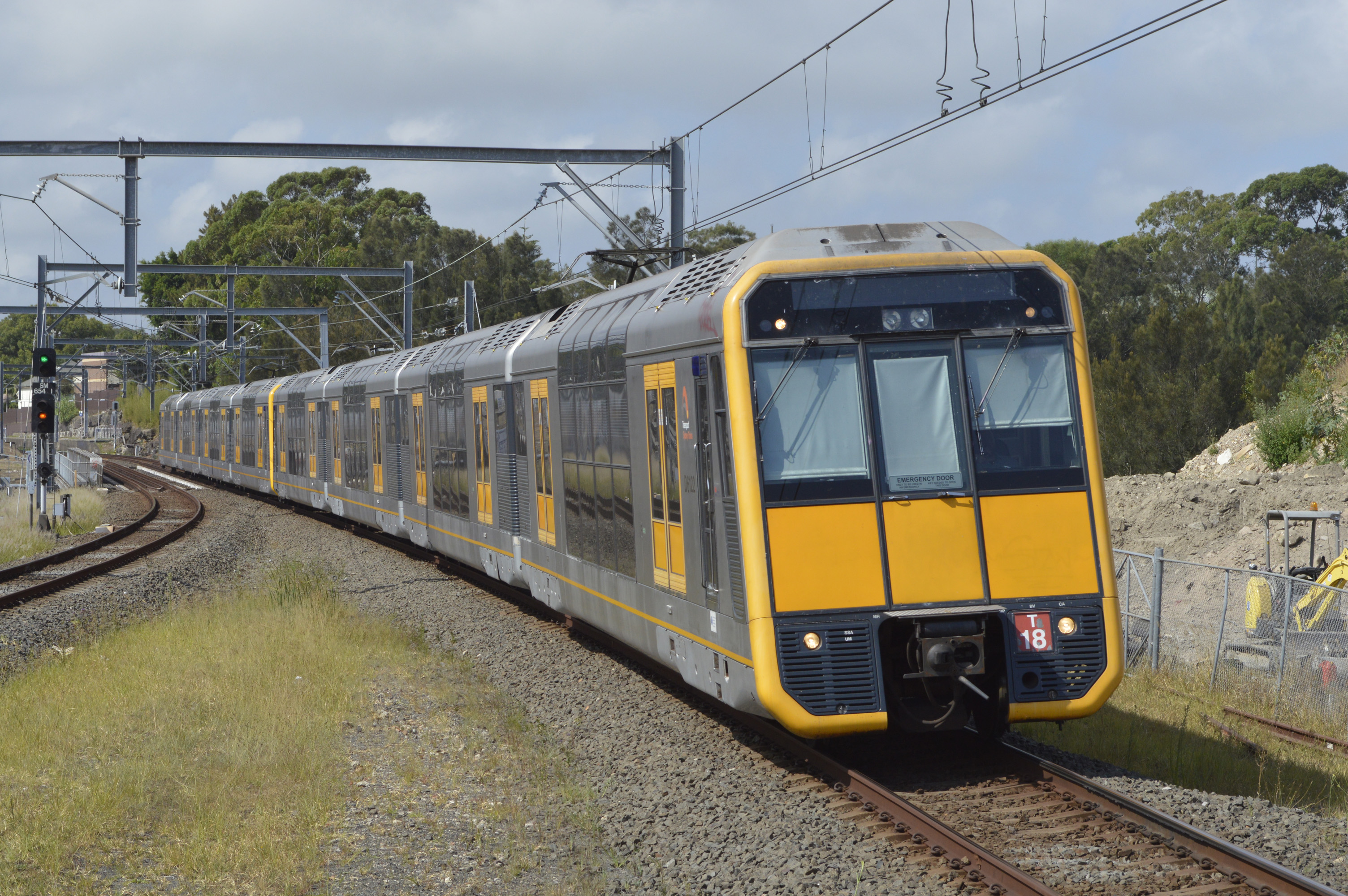
T set

In 1988, the "third generation" train, called Tangara – an Aboriginal word meaning "to go", was introduced. This train marked a radical departure from the previous double deck car design both in appearance and technically. The Tangara is the last publicly funded electric rolling stock built for CityRail – all future electric trains are being built and operated under public–private partnership agreements. A total of 450 T set cars were introduced between 1988 and 1994, allowing the withdrawal of the remaining single deck suburban passenger cars in 1993.

Eighty G set cars featuring toilets, high-backed reversible seating and passenger door opening controls were built between 1994 and 1996. These generally operated on outer-suburban runs, typically to Wollongong, Springwood and Gosford, though they also sometimes operated in suburban service. These outer-suburban sets allowed the retirement of the last remaining single-deck U sets in 1996. One set, G7, was experimentally fitted with dual-voltage A/C traction. This set was extensively damaged in the Waterfall rail accident in January 2003 and scrapped after completion of the coronial inquiry into the accident.

In 2010, a refurbishment program began for all Tangaras, which were by then nearly 20 years old and showing signs of wear and tear. This work involved reupholstered seats, new flooring and handrails, relocated end saloon partitions and a complete internal repaint. Inter-car doors and handrails are repainted yellow, and the interiors share common fittings with the Millennium and OSCAR cars. The former outer-suburban G sets have been retargeted as T sets from T101 onwards and the cars recoded from OD, ON and ONL to the suburban D & N codings, retaining the same 58xx and 68xx number series. The former ONL cars have had their toilet and water cooler removed and replaced with longitudinal seating, but without the luggage racks found elsewhere in these cars.

=== M set (Millennium) ===
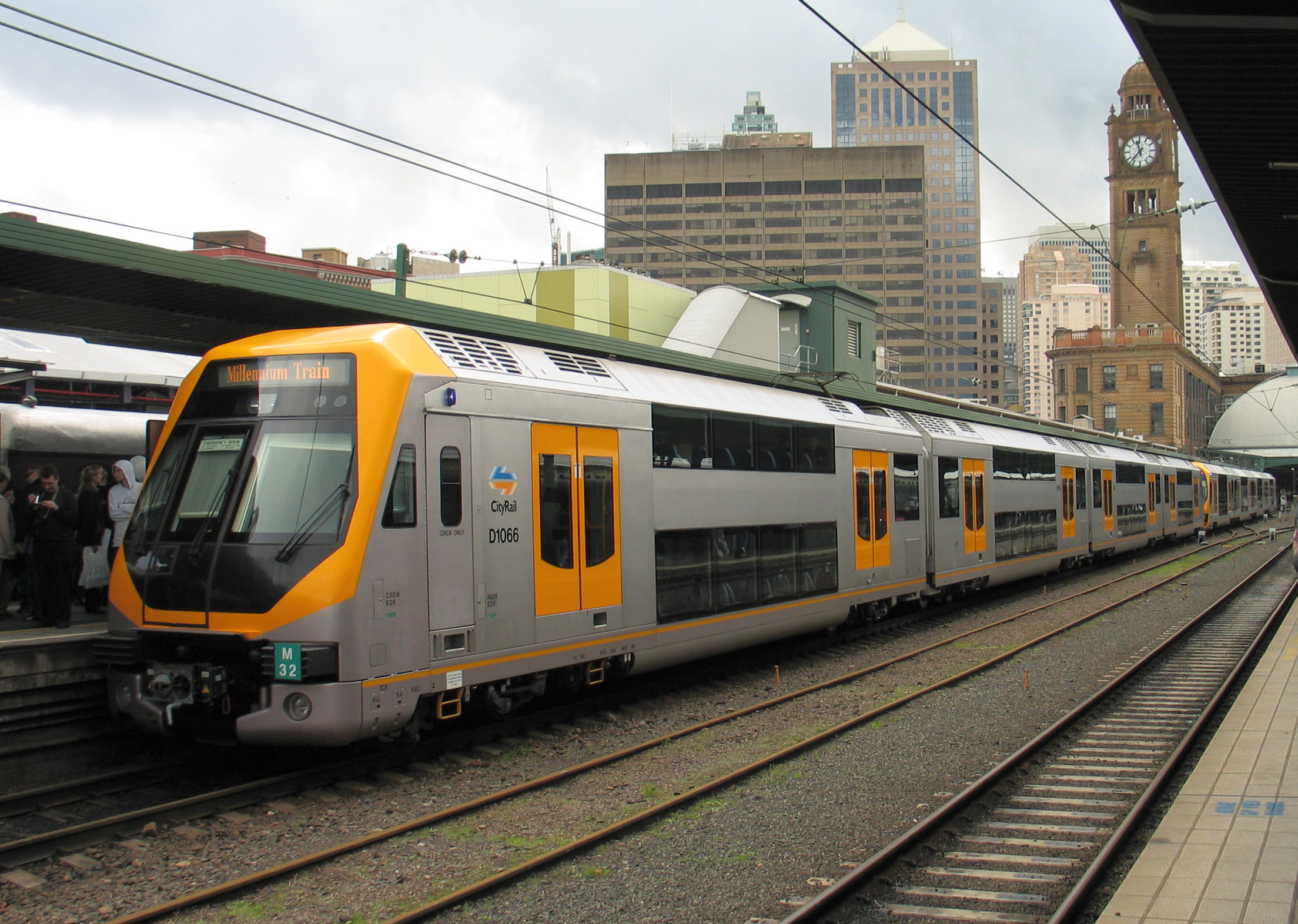
An M set at Central

From 2002, 140 "fourth generation" carriages were introduced. These trains allowed the withdrawal of the Tulloch trailer cars. These were the first passenger trains in NSW to introduce automatic passenger information displays and announcements. The design of the M sets formed the basis for the design of H sets and A sets. These trains are maintained by Downer Rail at the Auburn Maintenance Centre.

While the Millennium trains are suitable for division into four-car sets, they are normally kept coupled as eight-cars sets at all times.

=== A and B sets (Waratah) ===
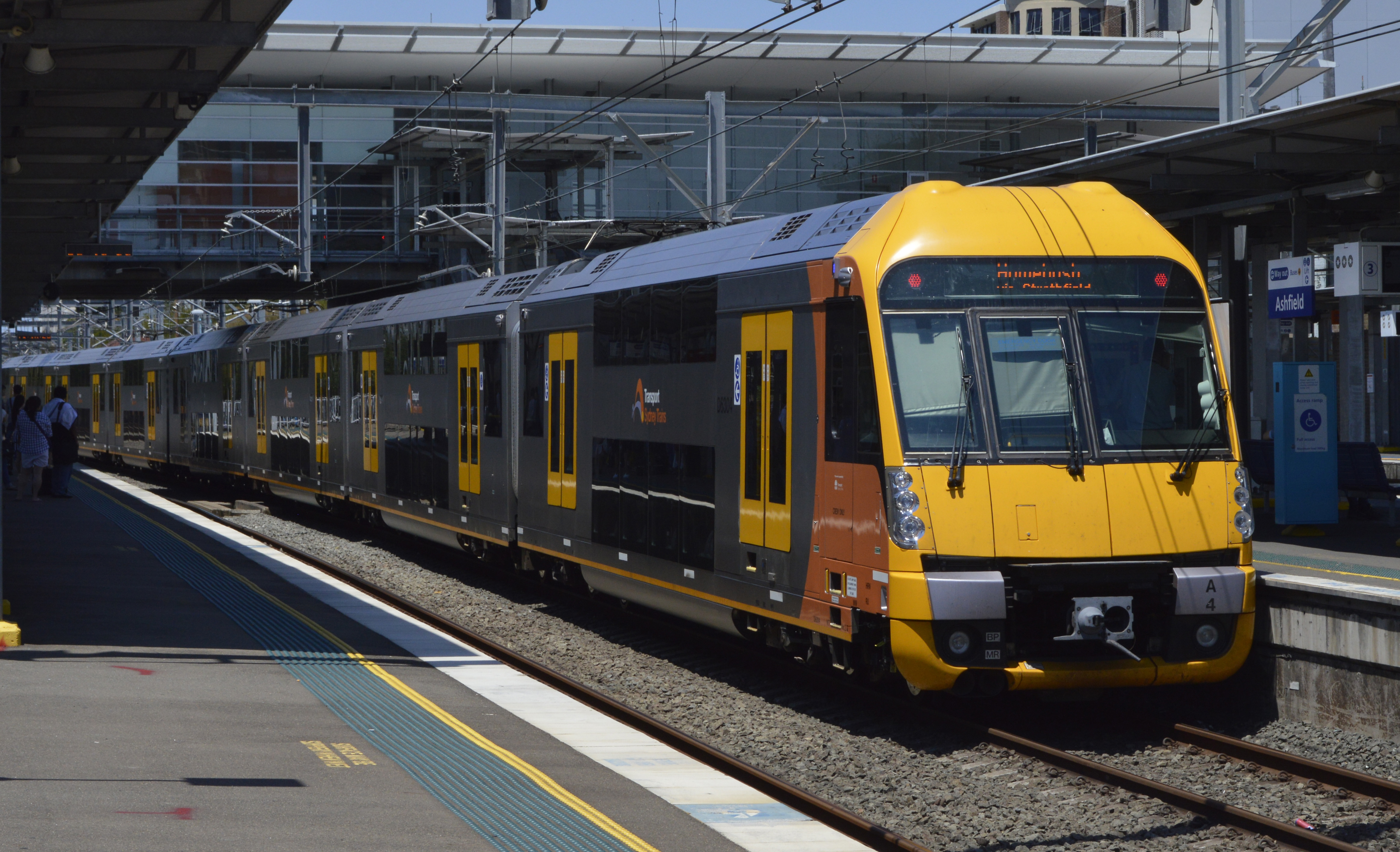
An A set at Ashfield station

The Waratah trains are a double-decker, air-conditioned train based on the Millennium trains, the order being for 78 sets of eight cars per train. The body shells were constructed in China and completed at Newcastle, New South Wales by a joint venture between the NSW Government, Downer Rail, and other companies under a public–private partnership, with delivery between 2011 and 2014 to replace the now withdrawn 6–8 car R & S Set trains. The first set went into regular service on 1 July 2011 on the Macarthur–East Hills–Airport line with the last set delivered by mid-2014.

The New South Wales Government announced on 1 December 2016 that 24 new suburban trains had been ordered. Known as the Sydney Growth Trains during development, the trains are officially classified as B sets and are also known as Waratah Series 2 trains. The $1.7 billion contract was awarded to Downer EDI. CRRC Changchun Railway Vehicles manufactured and delivered the bodies of the trains to Downer EDI, which assembled them. More than 90 percent of the design is shared with the original Waratahs. The first B set was unveiled in Auburn in March 2018. After undergoing months of testing, Set B2 was the first to enter revenue service on 7 September 2018. The B sets replaced the remaining S sets by the end of June 2019. In February 2019, a further 17 B sets were ordered.

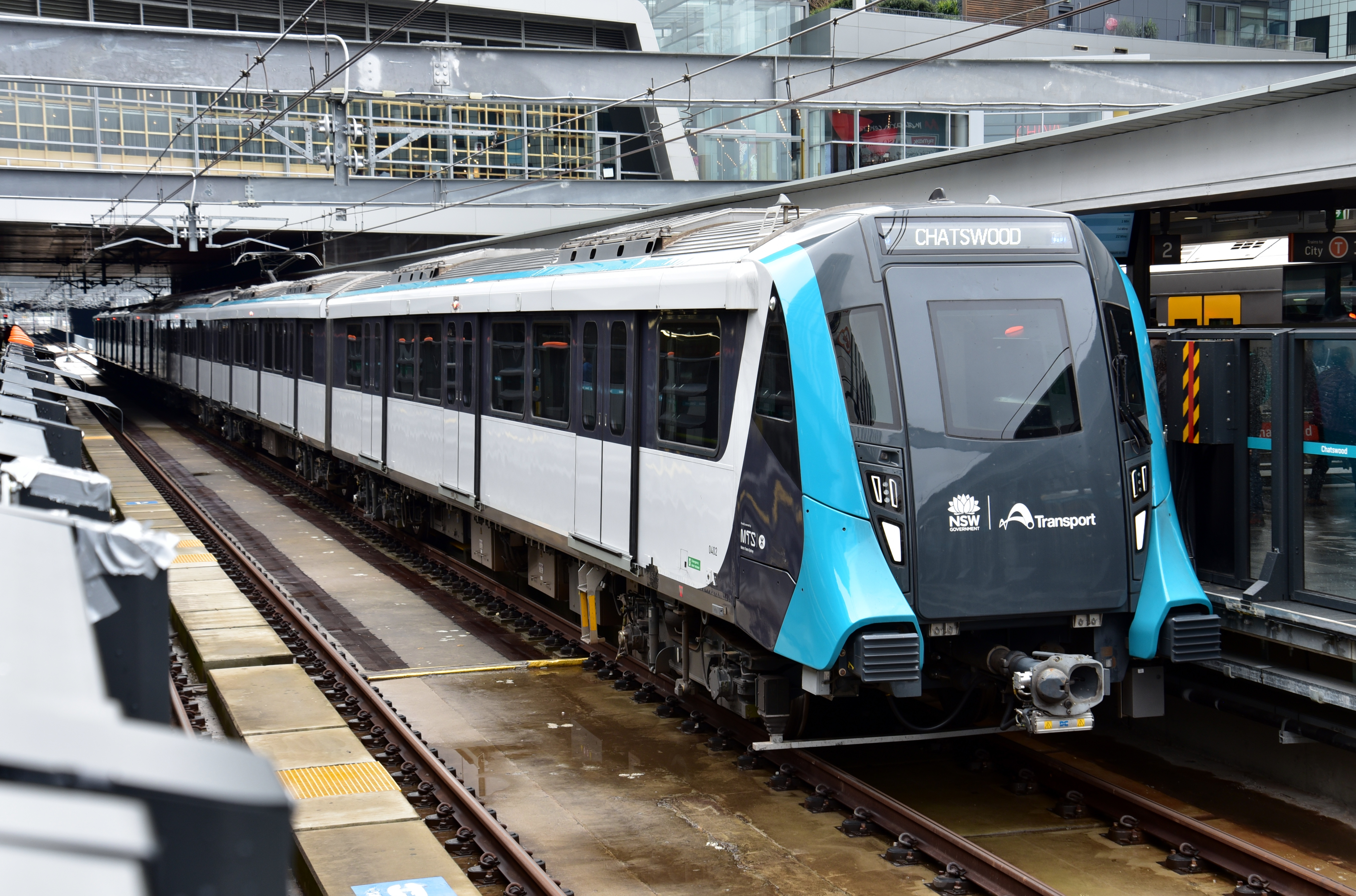
A Metropolis Stock train at Chatswood Station

== Sydney Metro rolling stock ==
=== Metropolis Stock ===
25 Sydney Metro Metropolis six-car sets were manufactured by Alstom and entered into service when the North West line of the Sydney Metro first opened with five minute services between Chatswood and Tallawong on 26 May 2019.

=== Inspiro Stock (Future) ===
12 sets of three-car Sydney Metro Insprio vehicles will be used on the Western Sydney Airport line, they were manufactured by Siemens Mobility.

== Former inter-urban passenger rolling stock ==
=== V sets ===
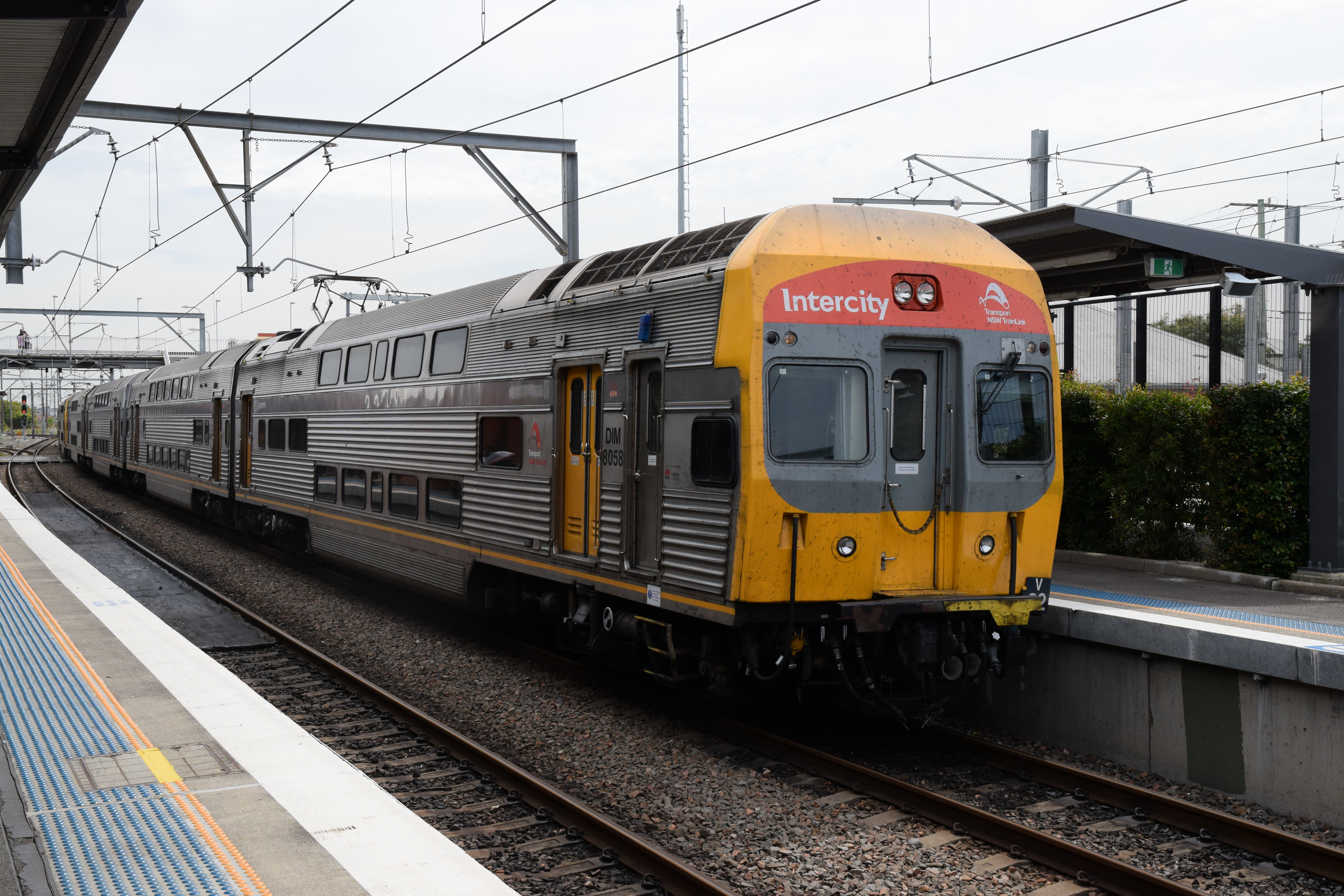
V set

Introduced from 1970, these double deck interurban cars actually predated the first full suburban double deck sets. Described at the time as the 'most luxurious commuter stock in the world', they set new benchmarks for passenger comfort in Sydney. Initial service was confined to the Central Coast & Newcastle Line until they were usable on the Blue Mountains Line after the Glenbrook tunnel was widened in 1975. They could proceed as far as Lithgow after the Lithgow tunnels were widened in 1979. Services began on the Illawarra line after electrification in 1985. Initially these sets carried 'U' target plates. The subsequent orders of double-deck cars carried 'V' plates to designate sets fitted with vacuum toilets. The original 1970 cars were not a success, and they were rebuilt into trailers to run with the later-series intercity cars in the early 1980s. These later cars could originally be identified by seating with plastic orange surrounds, and they lack a door between the passenger compartment and the small entry/exit area. The second series of the V-Sets (DCM/DM) commenced being phased out in early 2011, being replaced by H sets. When NSW TrainLink was established in 2013 the V sets were subject to refurbishment program involving the repainting and refitting the interior (all seating has now been fitted with bush plum coloured upholstery) and new exterior livery. The rest of the V sets were replaced between 2024 and 2026 with the introduction of the D sets

=== U sets ===
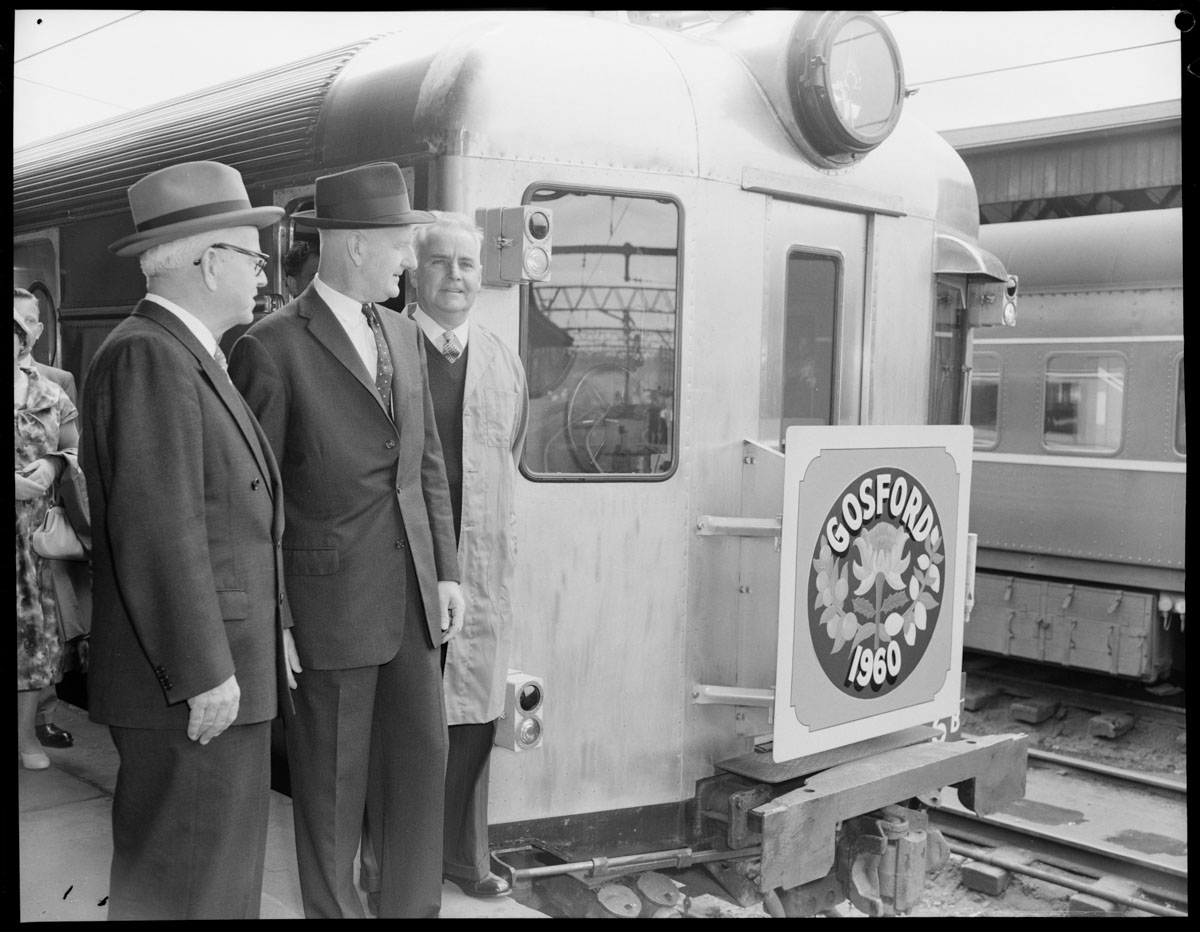
U set motor car at Gosford station in 1960

The initial 80 electric interurban passenger cars (40 "CF" power cars 5001–5040, 20 "TF" trailer cars 6001–6020 and 20 "ETB" trailer cars 6021–6040) were introduced from 1958 to coincide with the electrification of the Blue Mountains line to Bowenfels. These trains were similar in external appearance to the single deck steel suburban cars but were slightly narrower (for 2+2 across seating), built of unpainted stainless steel and corridor connectors between the cars. These trains carried a 'U' target plate, and became affectionately known as 'U Boats'. They featured First and Second Class accommodation until 1974, when they became "one class". First Class (in the ETB trailers) was identifiable by blue covered seats (as opposed to green seats in second class), carpet on the floor and ashtrays in the smoking section. Their operational sphere spread from Lithgow/Bowenfels and Gosford to include Port Kembla, Dapto and Newcastle until their final demise in 1996. They have been used on many railfan tours since the 1960s, sometimes loco-hauled outside the electrified area. Three power cars and two trailer cars have been preserved by the Sydney Electric Train Society. Other U-boat cars have been preserved privately, and many sold to private buyers for a variety of uses after withdrawal.

=== 620/720 class railcars ===
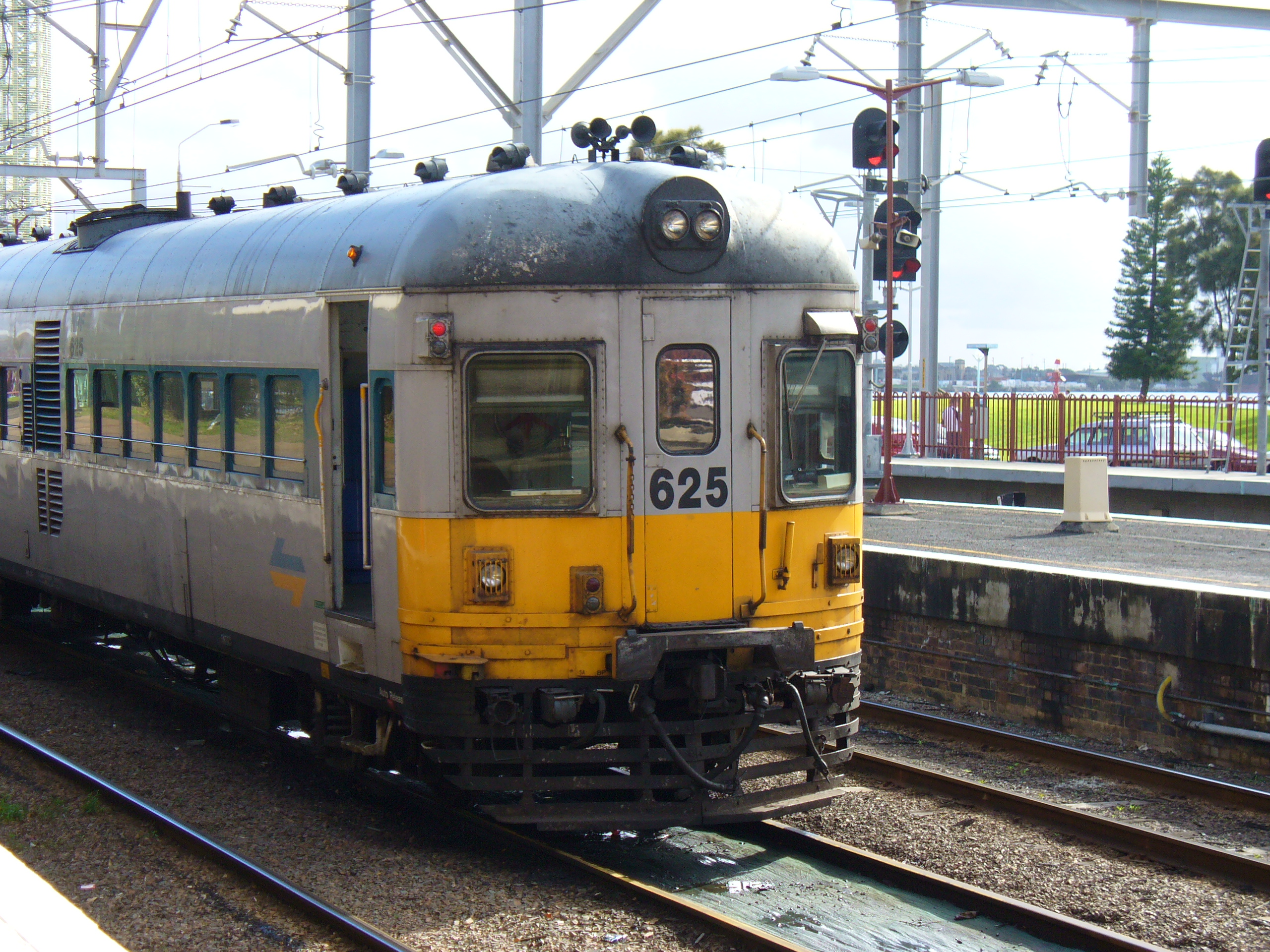
620/720 class railcar at Newcastle

Eighteen two-car self-propelled 620/720 class railcars were introduced between 1961 and 1968, constructed at the New South Wales Government Railways' Chullora Railway Workshops. They were the final passenger railcars to be built by government workshops in NSW. They were based on the 600/700 and 900/800 class railcars and were built for Newcastle suburban and regional workings, although they saw service on Wollongong services before electrification, and rural services to Cowra, Mudgee, Grafton and Murwillumbah. Three sets were built with first and second class accommodation and were used for country services, the remainder were single-class only (originally designated second class). They have served the non-electrified and pre-electrified sections of the Sydney suburban and outer-suburban (interurban) passenger networks – they saw service on the Richmond line until completion of electrification works in the 1990s. After the removal of many country services and the electrification of the South Coast Line in 1985 and the Richmond line in the 1990s, they saw service on the Far South Coast line and the Southern Highlands line. At introduction, they were painted tuscan red. From the 1970s, some carried an Indian red livery. In 1980, some were painted in a reverse livery with yellow front ends. From 1982 the 'candy' livery of bright red, with orange, yellow and white trims was introduced system-wide and the 620/720 class were no exception. In the 1990s, they were repainted from 'candy' into a 'heritage' livery reminiscent of the former tuscan paint scheme, before adopting a grey and blue corporate CityRail livery in the 2000s. After the introduction of the Endeavour railcars in 1994, their numbers were reduced to seven two-car sets, and they were all withdrawn from service during 2007.

Several of these sets have been preserved, with 621/721 repainted into 1960s deep Indian red livery with buff lining by the Rail Motor Society. This set has already seen use on enthusiast tours. At least one other set is under restoration to original external and internal condition.

=== SMR railcars ===
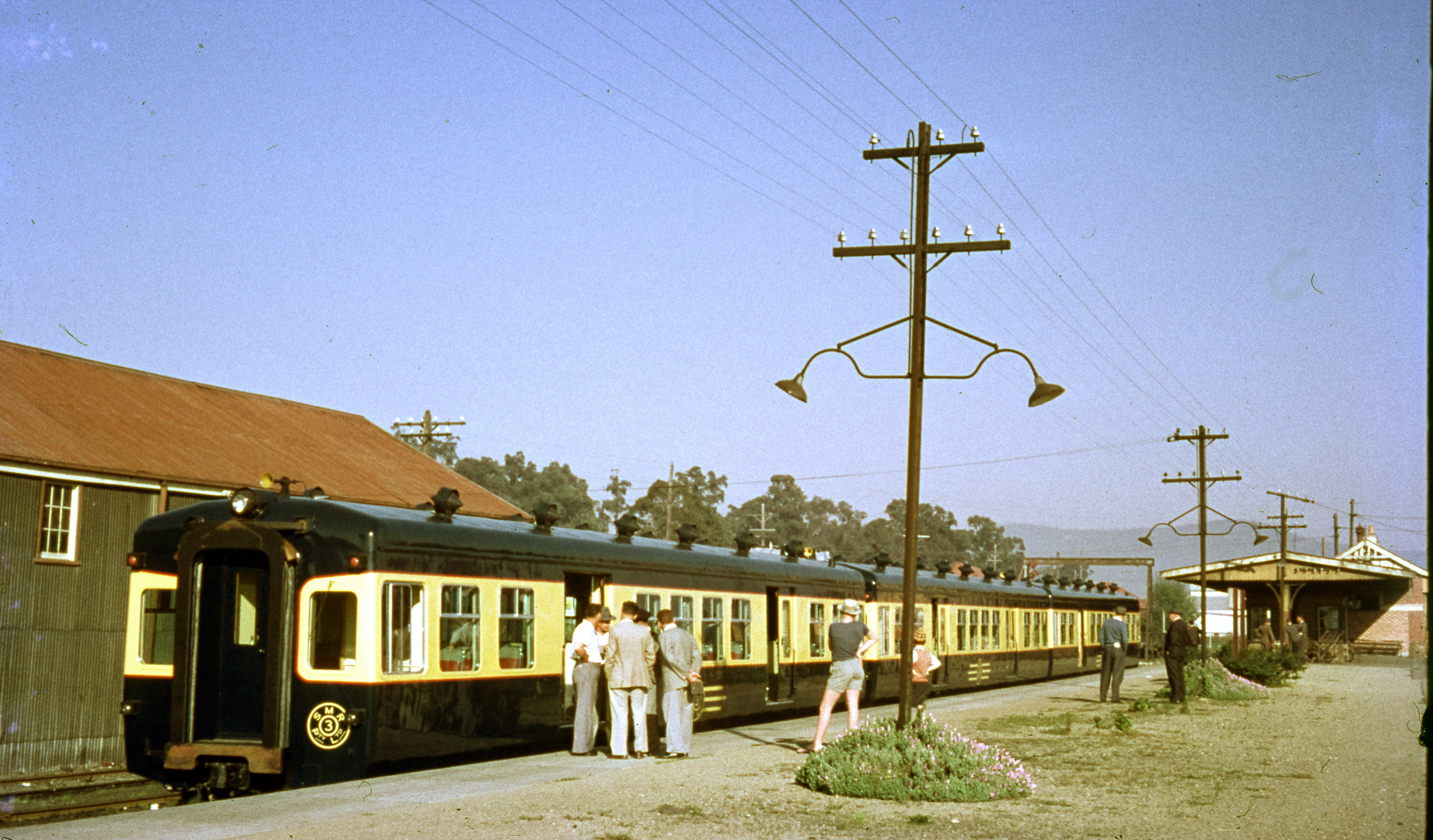
A South Maitland railcar at Cessnock Station in October 1961

The South Maitland Railways railcar was a class of diesel railcar built by Tulloch Limited for the South Maitland Railway (SMR) in 1961.

Having had all of carriages destroyed by a fire in March 1930, the SMR arranged for services to be operated by the New South Wales Government Railways (NSWGR). However, with the service running at a considerable loss, the SMR sought to reduce costs by introducing diesel railcars.

In September 1958, Tulloch Limited to answer an enquiry from the SMR for diesel railcars submitted a 65-page proposal document to SMR. As a result of this proposal SMR also approached Commonwealth Engineering for a request for a tender. In 1959 an order was placed with Tulloch Limited with all delivered for services to commence on 1 October 1961.

Tulloch developed the design for the railcars with the assistance of Tube Investments of England whom Tulloch had had a technical assistance agreement since 1959. The car bodies and underframes were of mild steel construction. Upon completion the railcars were tested on the NSWGR network in the Sydney region, travelling as far as Penrith. Railcar No.1 was delivered to East Greta Junction on 26 April, followed by No.2 on 2 June and No.3 on 14 July.

They operated all services on the line from Cessnock to Maitland except for the daily Cessnock Express to Sydney which continued to be operated by the NSWGR. All were painted royal blue and yellow. The original timetable provided services throughout the day, seven days a week. In May 1965, Saturday afternoon and all Sunday services were cancelled while off-peak services on weekdays were reduced to three in the morning and three in the afternoon.

In January 1967, all SMR operated passenger services were cancelled and the railcars withdrawn and placed in store at East Greta with a replacement Rover Motors bus service to Newcastle introduced. The through NSWGR operated services continued until May 1972. After attempts by SMR to sell the Tulloch railcars failed, they were scrapped in 1977.

=== 1100-class Budd railcars ===
The 1100 class railcar or Budd railcar are a type of diesel railcar built by Commonwealth Engineering for the New South Wales Government Railways in 1961. They primarily operated on the South Coast Daylight Express until withdrawn in 1993.

=== 1200-class Tulloch railcars ===
In 1968, an order was placed with Tulloch Limited for 10 railcars for the Riverina Express with the fleet delivered between October 1970 and May 1972. While awaiting delivery of sufficient cars to operate the service, some were used on Goulburn Day Train and South Coast Daylight Express services in company with the 1100 class railcars. In addition, two vehicles were also constructed for Victorian Railways as their DRC Class.

The ten cars were built in two configurations, one with a buffet section and seating for 8 First class and 36 Second Class (numbered PCR 1201–1203) and the other seating 18 First Class, 36 Second Class and a separate luggage compartment (numbered PCH 1221–1227). The objective was to provide two four-car trains, each consisting of one PCR and three PCH along with one spare car of each type.

They entered service on the Riverina Express in May 1972. The purpose of forming the trains with individual railcars was to allow it to divide at major stations along the route where cars detached for Cowra, Tumut, Lake Cargelligo and Hillston on selected days, as well as the traditional destinations of Griffith and Albury. On the return journey, the cars amalgamated again to form a single train back to Sydney.

The 1200s soon began to suffer equipment failures, particularly with their complex electrical system, especially when amalgamating. Following one car suffering a distorted engine support frame all were withdrawn in January 1973. The damaged car became an office. One set of four was returned to operate the service three days a week with locomotive hauled and later DEB sets operating it on the other days. This remaining cars were withdrawn in October 1975 when a second DEB set was transferred.

In May 1974, two cars (PCH 1224 and PCH 1227) were sold to Victorian Railways to complement the two DRC railcars it had purchased new. In 1977 four were converted to operate an exhibition train around New South Wales for the Silver Jubilee of Elizabeth II. Three more were pooled with the 1100 class railcars on Illawarra line services while the car with a damaged engine frame became an office. In 1981 it was decided to convert the latter and two of the Jubilee cars into loco hauled cars, the remaining five were similarly treated in 1983. They were placed in service on the Illawarra line between Sydney and Bomaderry.

They did occasionally stray operating both the Canberra Express and Newcastle Flyer in January 1986.

Following the cessation of locomotive hauled South Coast services in January 1991, they were redeployed to operate services on the Main South line to Moss Vale and Goulburn.

In February 1993, six of the carriages were given a light refurbishment before being withdrawn in November 1993. In August 1994, six were auctioned.

== Current inter-urban rolling stock ==
=== H sets (OSCAR) ===
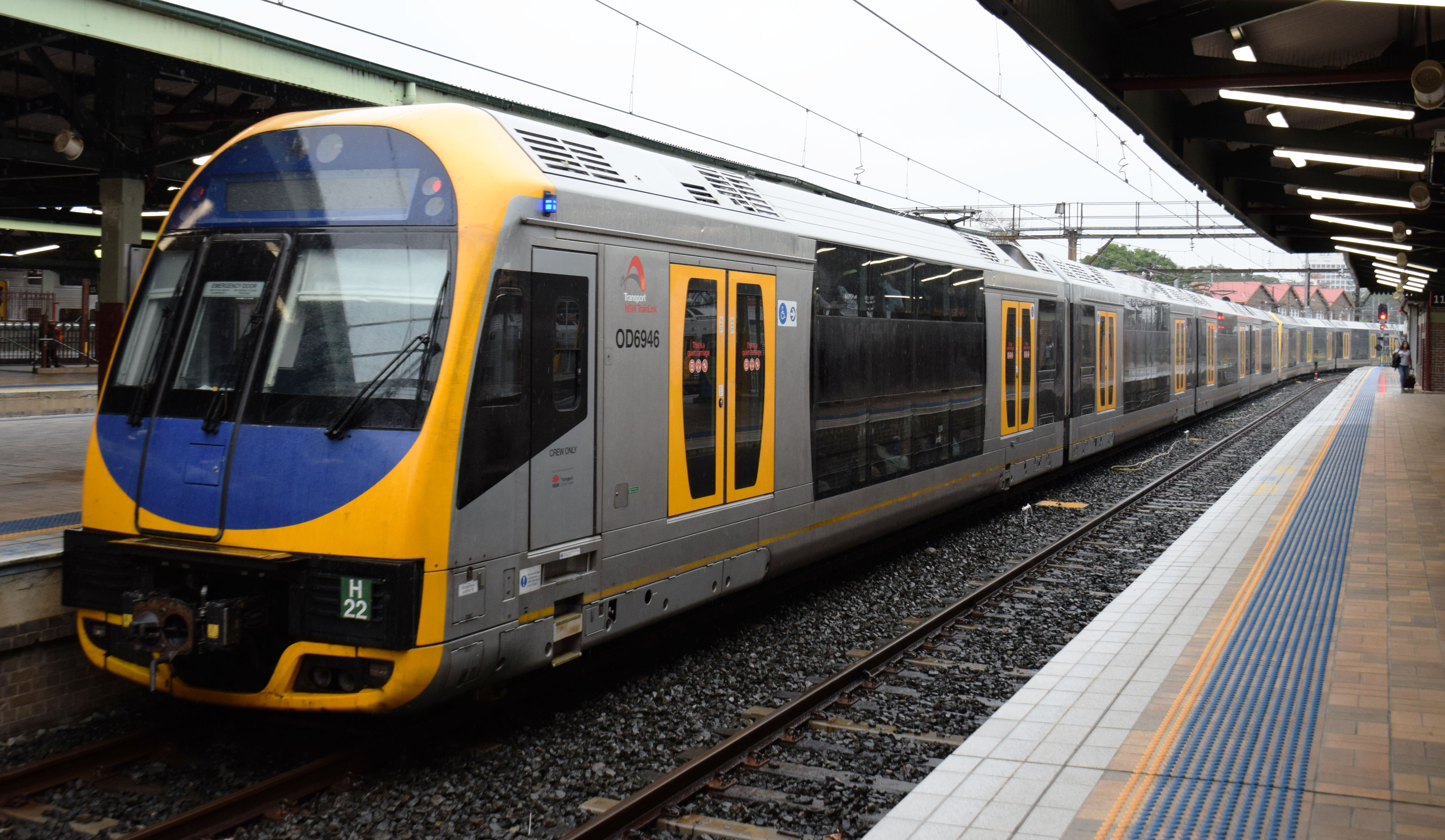
H set

The H sets, or OSCAR (Outer-Suburban CAR) trains, were launched on 24 April 2006. The H sets were principally built to replace the G set Tangaras on outer-suburban services and the original order of V sets. They feature identical reversible seating to Hunter railcars, and one disabled toilet per four-car set, whilst the vestibules feature longitudinal seating and ceiling hand-grips. They run to Newcastle Interchange, Port Kembla and Kiama. These cars were built by UGL Rail. When the D sets are introduced, the H sets will also be displaced and moved onto the Sydney Trains suburban network.

=== J sets (Hunter) ===
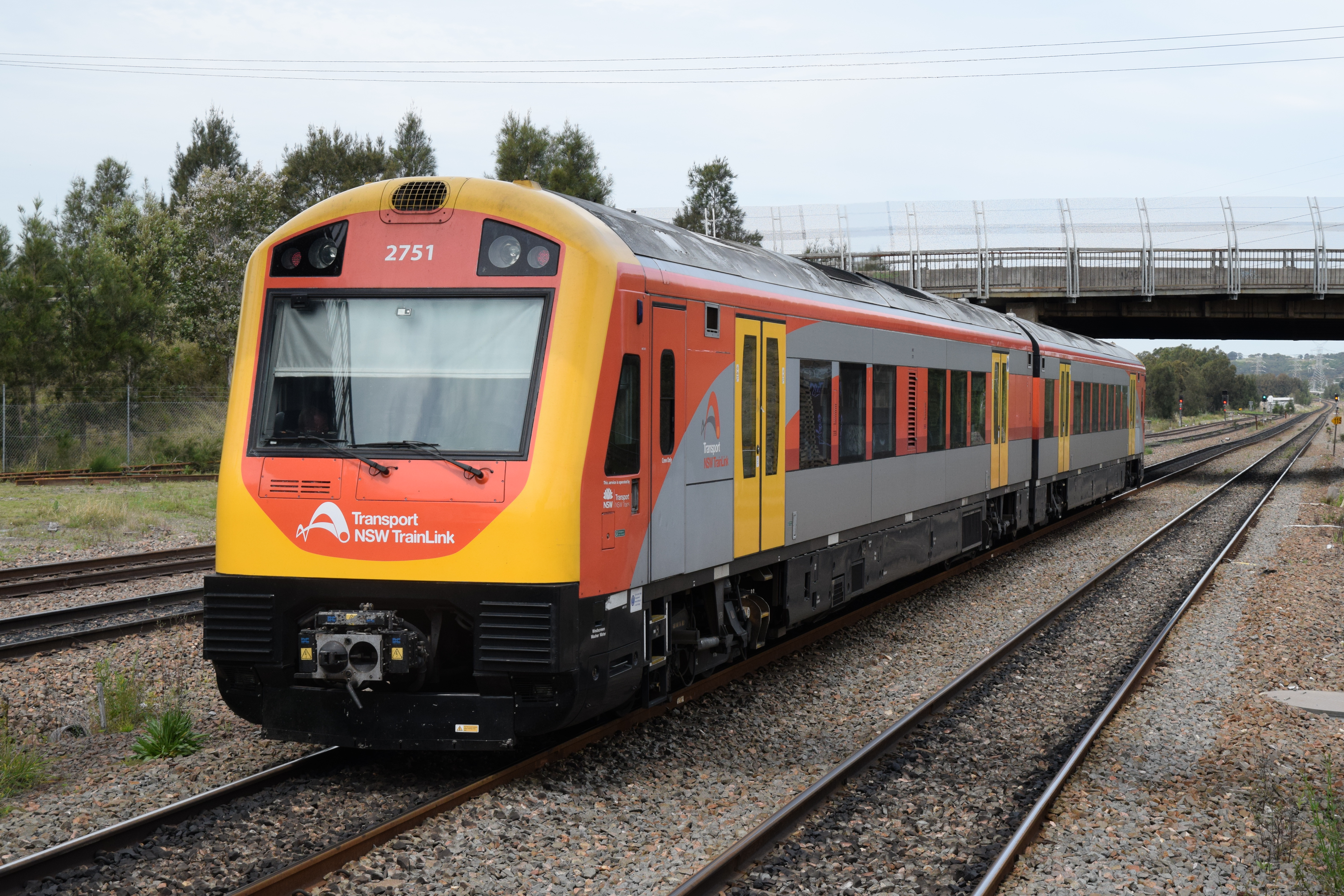
Hunter railcar

In 2006, 14 J sets, or Hunter railcars were ordered to replace 620/720 class railcars. They are a new type of diesel multiple unit used on the Hunter Valley lines centred on Newcastle. The trains were built by United Goninan and are sharing Newcastle to Maitland, Telarah and Dungog regional services with Endeavour railcars. The design is derived from the new generation Transwa Prospector, except that the lower top speed requirement for the Hunter railway line means that the driving cars are each single-engined instead of dual-engined.

=== Endeavour railcars ===
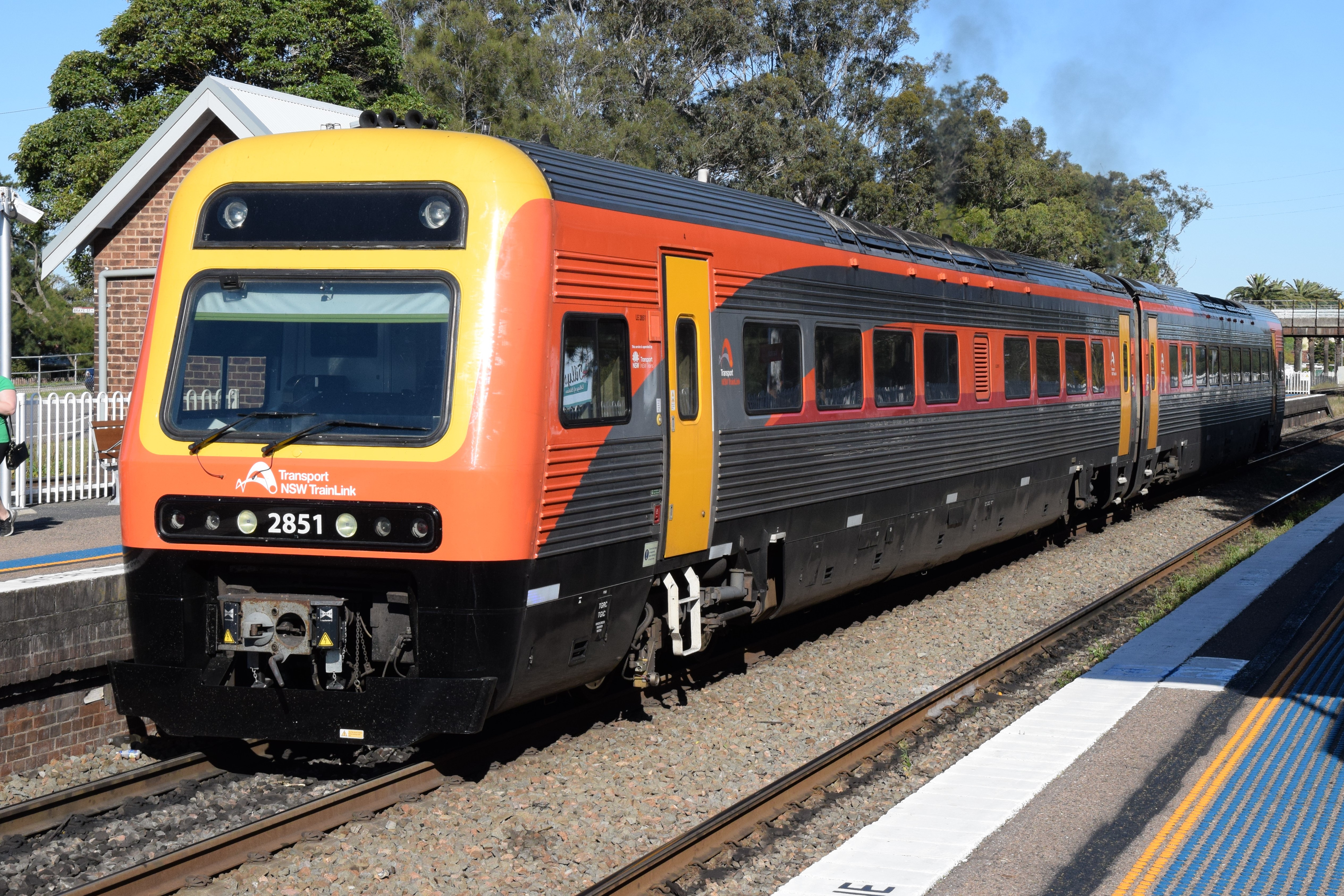
An Endeavour set in the NSW TrainLink livery

28 Endeavour diesel railcars were introduced from 1994 to operate the non-electrified CityRail lines to replace the ageing DEB railcars and some of the 620/720 class railcars. They currently operate on the Southern Highlands line, the Illawarra line between Kiama and Bomaderry, the Bathurst Bullet on the Main Western line and the Hunter line. They previously operated weekend service on the Moss Vale–Unanderra line. They operate as two or four-car sets. Several cars were converted into Xplorers, which they are technically and mechanically identical to.

=== D sets (Mariyung) ===
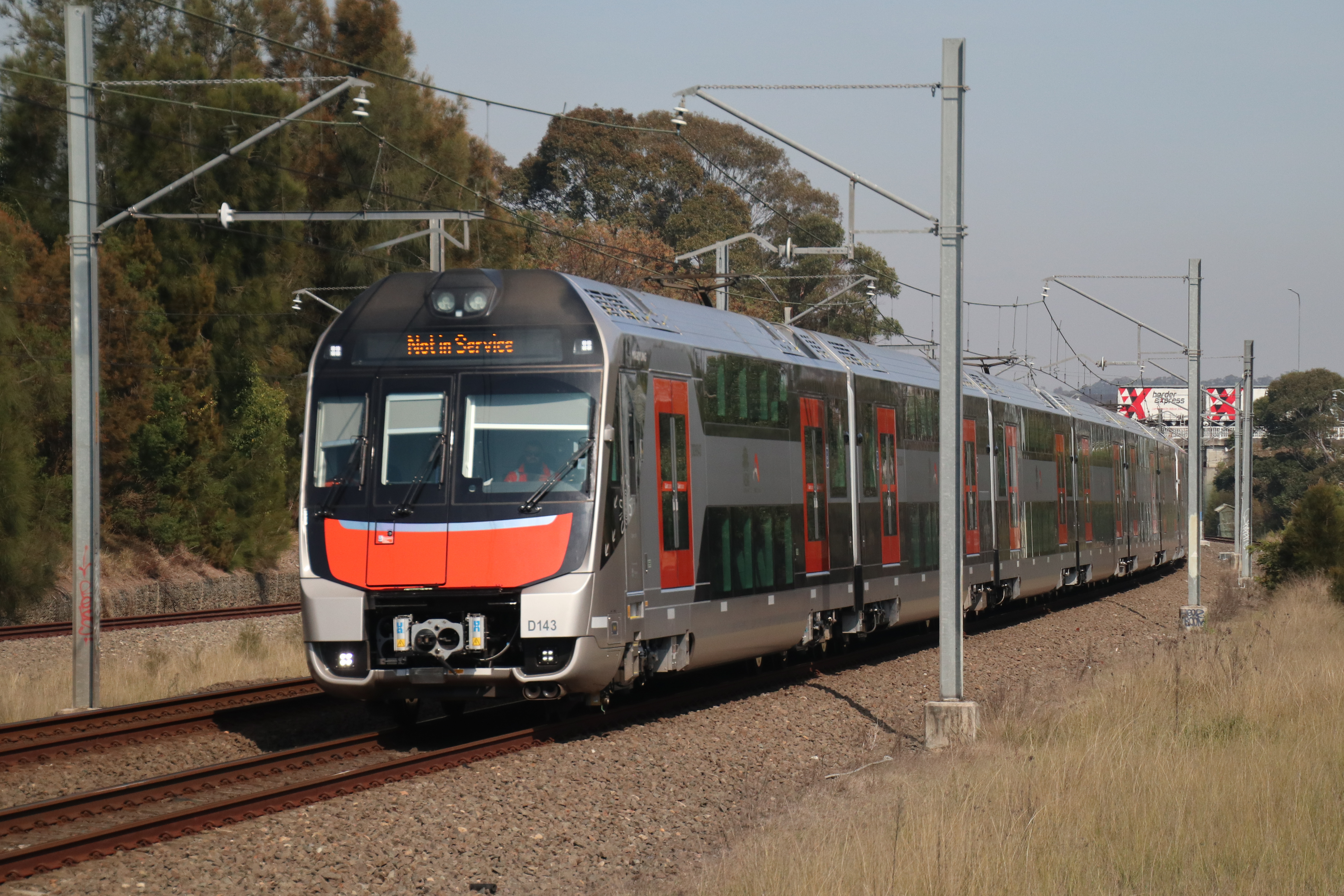
A Mariyung D set on a test run

The D sets, or Mariyung trains, are a class of 610 new carriages built to replace the entire V set fleet and allow the H sets to be reallocated to Sydney suburban services. They currently operate all services on the Central Coast and Newcastle Line, all electric services on the Blue Mountains Line, and some services on the South Coast Line.

== Former regional passenger rolling stock ==
=== CPH (Tin Hare) railmotors ===
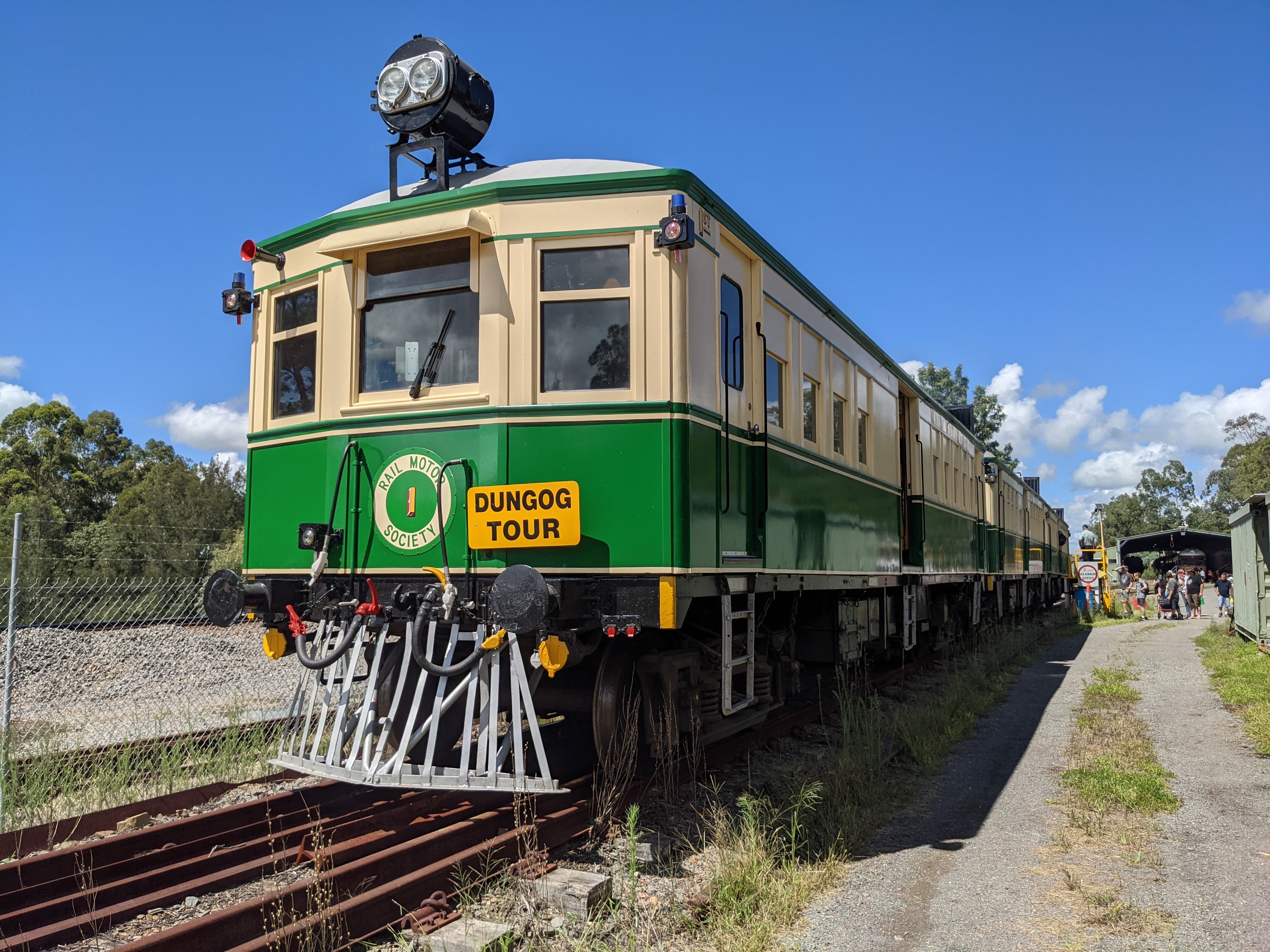
CPH1 railmotor

The CPH railmotors were introduced from 1923 to provide feeder services on country branch lines. They operated many branch line services in the south of the state until their widespread withdrawal in 1974. They also provided pre-electrification service on the Richmond line, late night Clyde – Carlingford shuttles, Sutherland – Waterfall on the Illawarra line and Pippita & State Abattoirs line in suburban Sydney until they were officially withdrawn with the 27 November 1983 timetable. A handful of CPH railmotors worked Wollongong suburban services for some months afterwards. Many of these veteran rail motors are preserved and still operational. Following the failure of 620 railcars to fit through the Fernleigh tunnel, the CPH railmotors also provided passenger service from Newcastle to Belmont.

=== Creamy Kate and Trailer ===
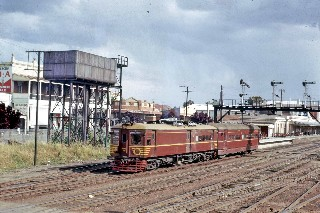
Creamy Kate at Junee

After an accident at Bowning, in which several passenger cars were damaged, two underframes were salvaged. Around the two underframes, a two-engine railmotor and attendant trailer were constructed. The motor car was allocated number CHP38 and the trailer 81. It spent most of its days on branch lines out of Narrandera. Trailer 81 was ultimately rebuilt and renumbered FT551 and worked Sutherland to Waterfall shuttles with conventional CPH railmotors until electrification in July 1980.

=== 1935 S type carriages ===
Between 1935 and 1937 Clyde Engineering built 35 first class BS carriages with 42 seats and 86 second class FS side corridor carriages with 64 seats at its Granville factory.

Over the years they operated on services from express passenger and mail trains to branch line services. Withdrawals commenced in the 1970s but some lasted until the late 1980s on mail trains to Dubbo, Moree and Tenterfield and Interurban services to Newcastle, Bathurst, Goulburn and Bomaderry.

During the period spanning 1974 to 1982 eight were gutted internally and fitted with suburban throw over seating and Beclawat windows for use on interurban services. These received the IFS and MFS classifications. As at June 1986, 32 remained in service with the State Rail Authority.

=== Silver City Comet ===
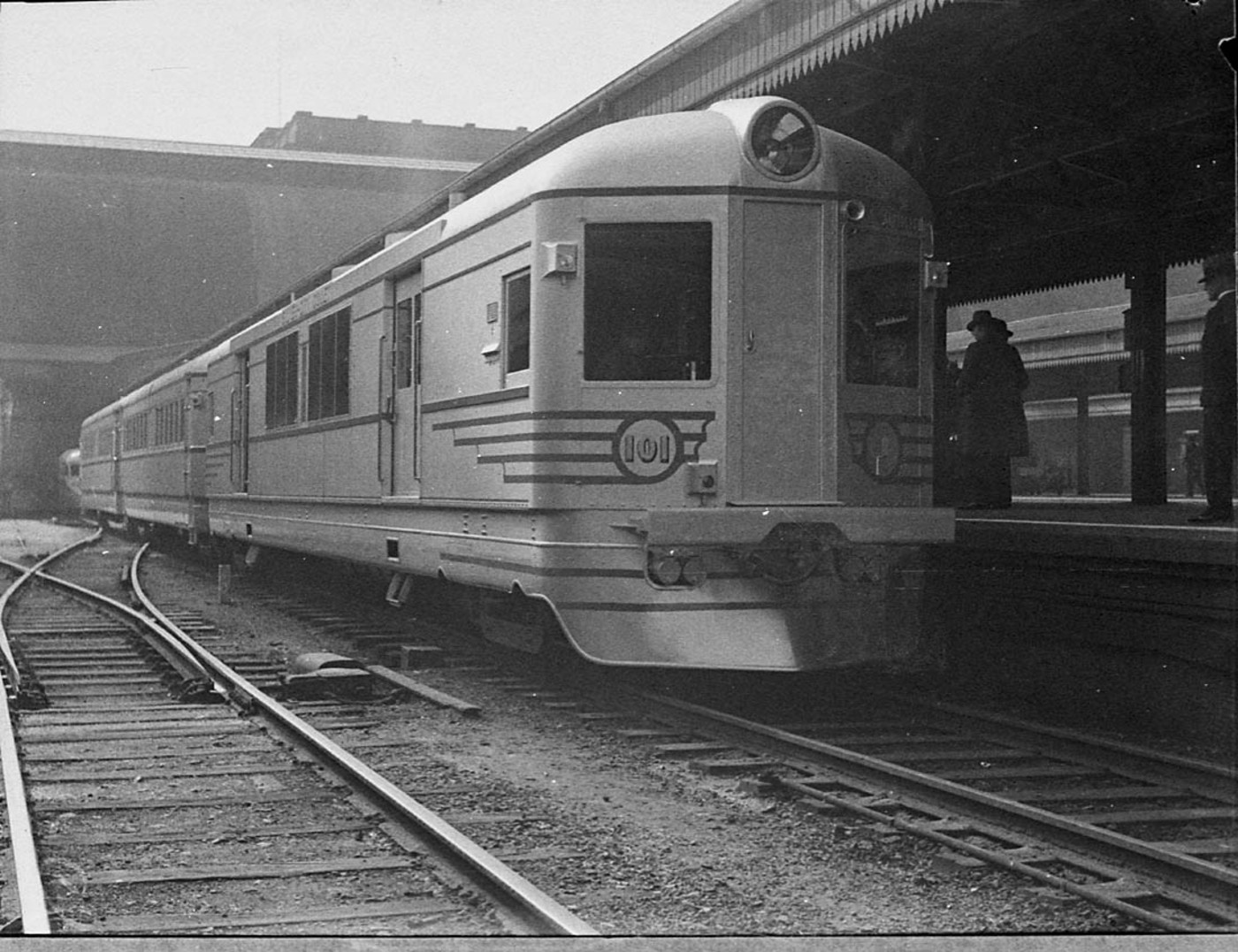
The Silver City Comet at Central, 1937

These self-propelled diesel passenger trains were introduced in 1937 and operated between Parkes and Broken Hill. During World War II, they were also used on some intercity runs from Sydney to Canberra and Newcastle. Together with Victorian Railways' "Spirit of Progress", it was the first air-conditioned train in the British Empire.

When introduced, it was originally painted silver, to reflect the harsh heat of the western plains. After World War II, Silver City Comet sets were repainted in standard NSWGR tuscan & russet, then Indian red liveries. Prior to the 50th anniversary of the Silver City Comet in 1987, it reverted to the original silver livery. The Silver City Comets were withdrawn in 1989. The majority of the remaining Silver City Comet fleet has been preserved in static condition.

=== FP Paybus ===
The FP paybuses were a series of thirteen small 4 wheel railbuses built for the Department of Railways New South Wales between 1937 and 1970. The rail buses were intended for use on branch lines whose low passenger numbers did not warrant the use of a larger railmotor.

=== 1939 N type carriages ===
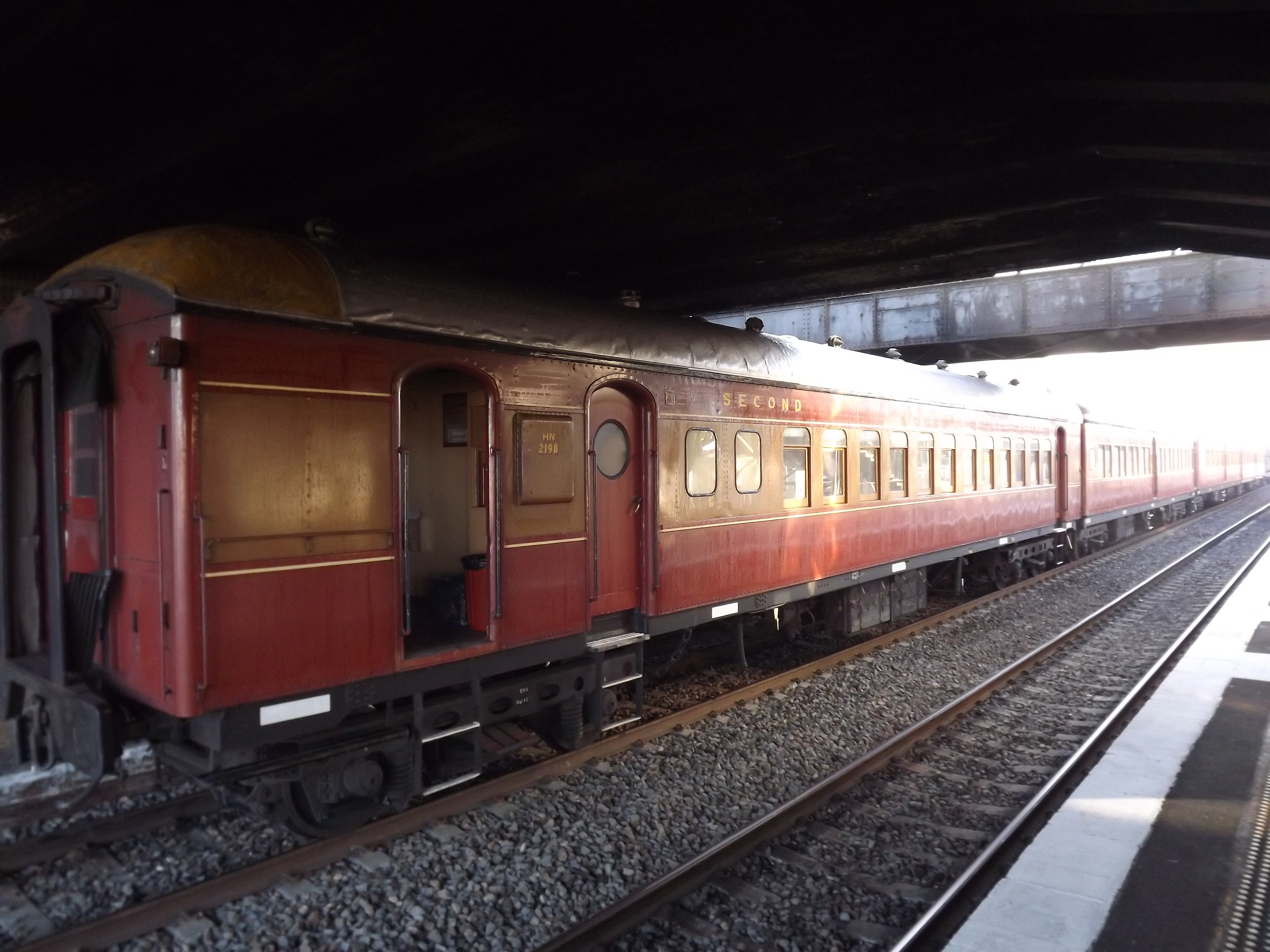
N type carriage stock

In September 1938, the Department of Railways New South Wales awarded a contract to Waddington, Granville for 35 steel carriages. They were equipped with forced air ventilation and downward opening windows. Neither were successful and were replaced by more conventional fittings.

The cars were delivered as 5 NUB sets of seven cars, normally marshalled as HFN, FN, FN, BN, BN, FN and HFN. Car numbers were 2177–2211 and the cars being numbered sequentially within each set. The BN cars were first class cars and sat 56 passengers in seven semi-partitioned sections. The FN cars were second class cars and could seat 78 passengers. The HFN cars were second class brake vans and could seat 68 passengers.

In May 1944, they were placed on the Newcastle Flyer services until replaced by HUB sets from 1948. They were also used on the Cessnock Express.

By 1969, five cars were modified from FN to RFN to provide additional buffets for the NSWGR fleet. The modified cars were three tons lighter and had a capacity of 47 passengers. A number were modified to BAM sleeper cars for use on longer distance trains which allowed retirement of a number of the older TAM type sleepers.

Over the years, they operated on both express passenger and mail train services. In May 1968, some were converted for use on the Brisbane via Wallangarra service while in June 1970, others were modified for use on the Southern Highlands Express. They were withdrawn in the late 1980s following the cessation of the Northern and Western Mails.

=== 400/500 class Railmotor ===
The 400 & 500 Class rail motors are diesel trains built by New South Wales Government Railways primarily for use on regional lines throughout NSW. The trains have since been phased out following a rationalisation of country branch line rail services in November 1983. The 400 Class power cars were built in 1938 at the Eveleigh Carriage Workshops, while the 500 Class trailer cars were built by Ritchie Brothers at Auburn.

=== 1948 HUB set carriages ===
The HUB set cars were ordered by the Department of Railways New South Wales in 1943 to operate services from Sydney to Newcastle. Originally the contract was for an additional 25 N type carriages, but due to wartime restrictions construction was delayed and the contract was amended with the carriages being altered to air conditioned and an additional 3 cars added to the order. The contract was awarded to Tulloch Limited, Rhodes who built the 28 carriages numbered 2212 to 2239 between 1947 and 1949, and formed into four sets of seven carriages. Each carriage was 19.83 metres in length. The cars consisted of:

- eight first class cars coded BH
- four first class with buffet coded RBH
- four second class coded FH
- four second class with buffet coded RFH
- four second class with guard coded HFH
- four second class cars with power generating equipment coded PFH.

The 4 sets coded HUB were numbered 116–119, with each set originally consisting of HFH, RFH, BH, BH, RBH, FH and PFH. The first set entered service in April 1948 on the Newcastle Flyer. One briefly operated the Riverina Express before being transferred to the South Coast Daylight Express and them in 1956 to the Central West Express to Orange.

From the 1970s, the HUB sets ceased operating as fixed formations and the carriages were operated with RUB and stainless steel rolling stock on services throughout the state.

They ceased operating the Newcastle Flyer services in April 1988 and many were withdrawn as a number of locomotive hauled services ceased in the early 1990s. Some remained in service with CityRail on Southern Highlands services to Goulburn until replaced by Endeavour railcars in 1994.

Most were auctioned in August 1994 with the State Rail Authority retaining five. In 1996 three were returned to traffic for use on CountryLink's new services to Broken Hill and Griffith before being withdrawn in April 2000.

=== 600/700 Railmotor ===
The 600/700 class railcars were a class of Diesel Multiple Unit built by the New South Wales Government Railways. They were built to operate on branch lines from 1949 with low traffic volumes later being transferred to Newcastle and Wollongong to operate suburban services until withdrawn in 1994. However, one 600 class railcar was converted to solar operation for use on the Byron Bay Train service. The upgraded train entered service on 16 December 2017 and is believed to be the world's first solar-powered train.

=== 1949 RUB set carriages ===
The RUB type carriage stock was a type of steel bodied air conditioned passenger carriage operated by the New South Wales Government Railways from September 1949 until April 2000.

=== 900/800 class diesel rail motors ===
From 1955 until 1990, air-conditioned 800/900 class trains, known as DEB sets, provided service to Canberra as the Canberra Monaro Express, replacing the steam hauled Federal City Express. The DEB sets were also used on some South Coast Line and Southern Highlands Line commuter services until they were replaced by Endeavour railcars in 1994.

=== 1961 Stainless Steel carriages ===
The New South Wales stainless steel carriage stock was a type of passenger carriage operated by the New South Wales Government Railways from 1961 until 1993. These carriages were mainly used on interstate trains such as the Southern Aurora, which ran between Sydney and Melbourne, its slower counterpart the Spirit of Progress and the Brisbane Limited. They were also used on the Gold Coast Motorail to Murwillumbah.

With the demise of locomotive-hauled trains, the majority of the carriages passed to the Australian Railway Historical Society, Canberra and New South Wales Rail Transport Museum who have maintained them in operational condition. The latter often operates them on tours under the Southern Aurora banner.

== Current regional passenger rolling stock ==
=== XPT ===
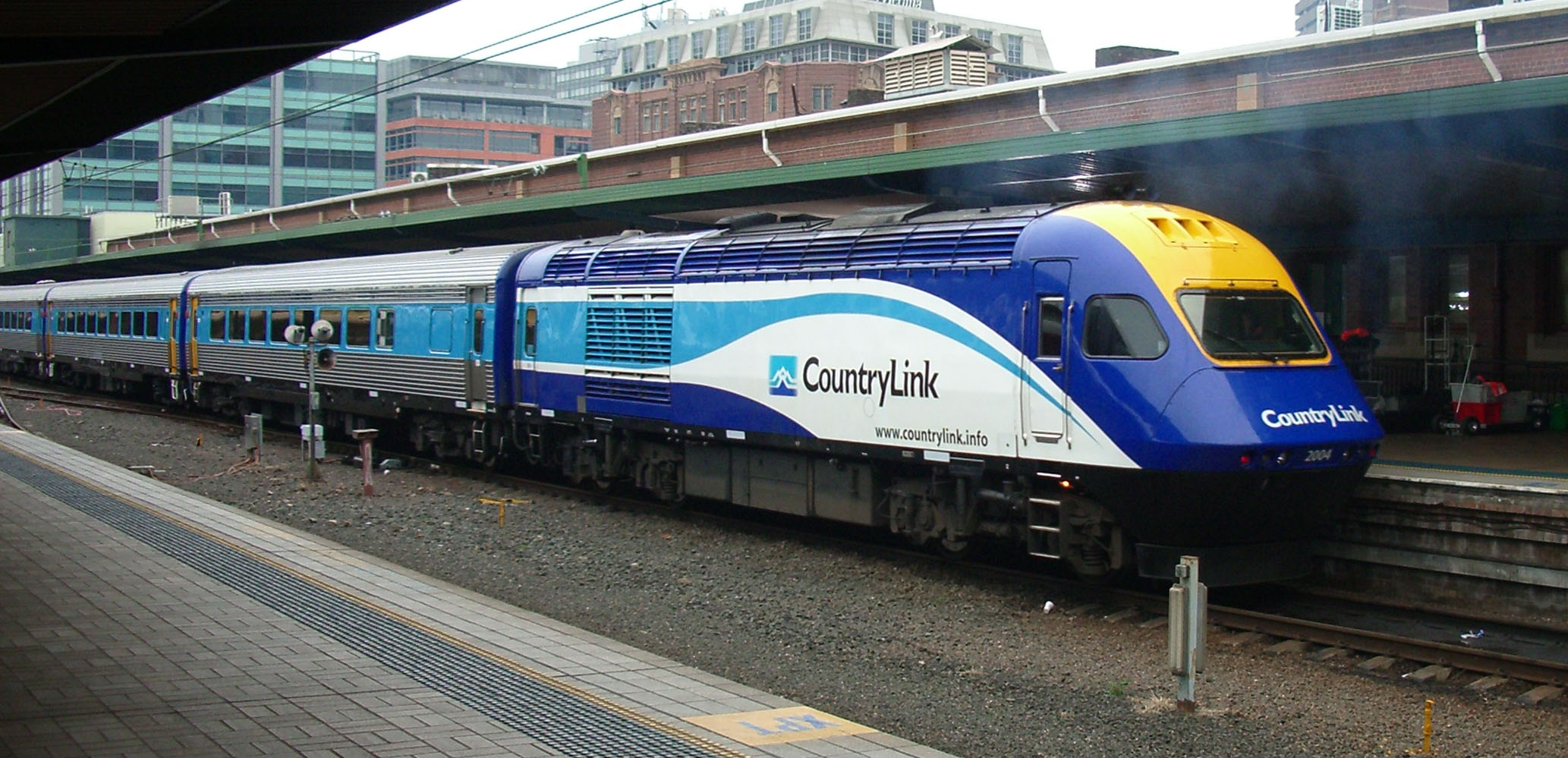
An XPT in CountryLink livery

The XPT (express passenger train) is the mainstay of the NSW country passenger rail-network. Modelled on the British HST and introduced from 1982, they currently provide service from Sydney to Melbourne, Brisbane, Dubbo, Grafton and Casino. An XPT consist can vary between four and seven cars depending on demand. Initially, the XPT was painted in a livery that was predominately red, with black and orange was also used in the livery and InterCity XPT signwriting on the power cars. The initial impact of the XPT's striking livery provided the inspiration for the "candy-stripe" livery to be applied to SRA locomotives and the interurban & country passenger car fleet from 1982. The first CountryLink repaint was introduced in 1991, and was updated to a new CountryLink livery in 2008. Class leader XP2000 has appeared in a number of special liveries for Sydney 2000 Games and the 2001 Centenary of Federation. In the early 1990s, XAM sleeping cars were added to the interstate XPT consists after protests arising from the cancellation of the locomotive hauled sitting & sleeping car trains Brisbane Limited and Pacific Coast Motorail in 1990.

=== Xplorer ===
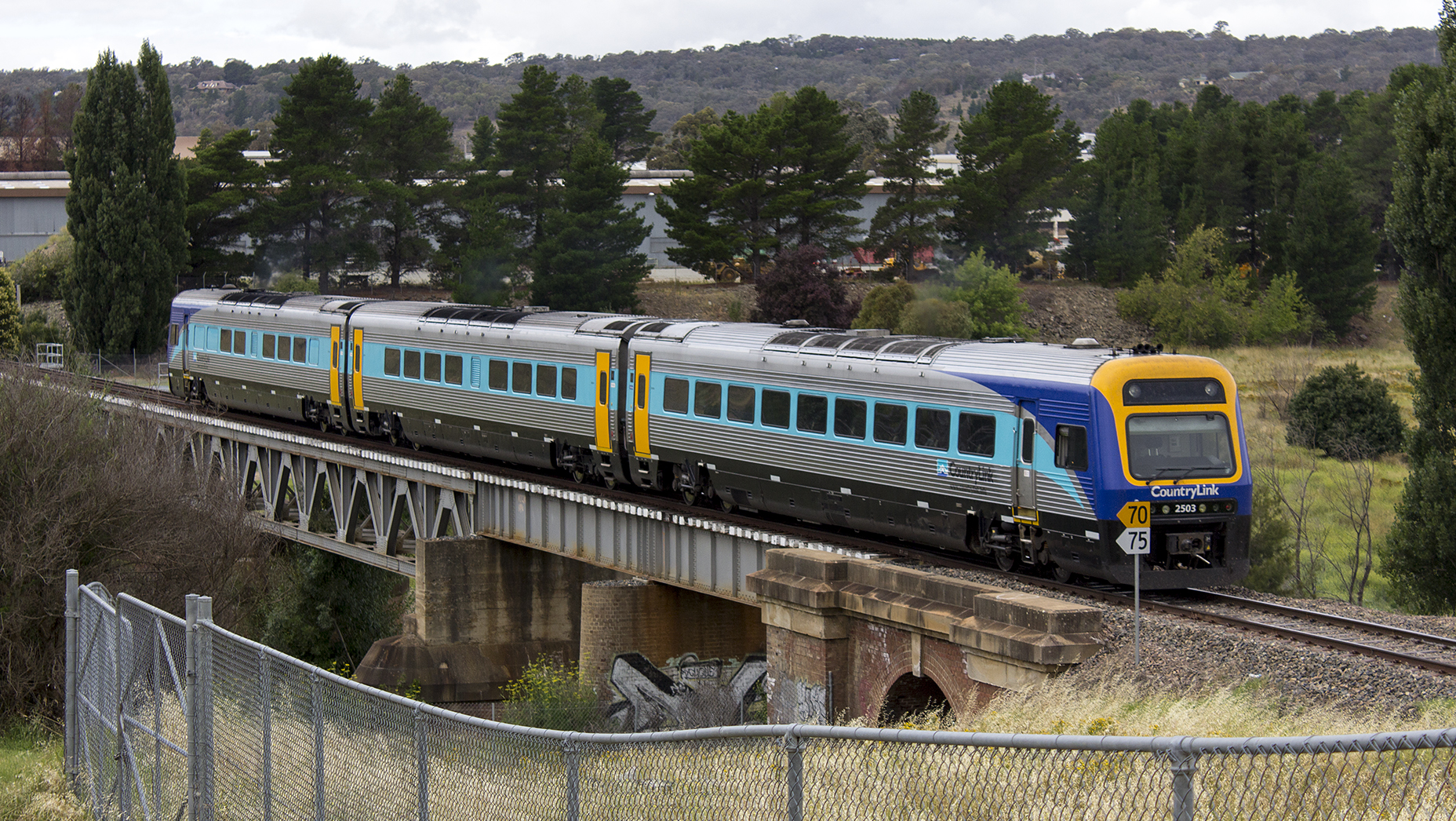
An Xplorer in the final CountryLink livery.

The Xplorer is a diesel self-propelled multiple unit train, introduced from 1993. They provide services to Canberra, Griffith, Moree, Armidale and Broken Hill. They are technically and mechanically similar to NSW TrainLink's Endeavour railcars, but with a buffet service and a higher standard of accommodation.

=== R sets (Future) ===
The NSW TrainLink Regional Train Project is an initiative of Transport for NSW to procure new trains to replace NSW TrainLink's Endeavour, Xplorer and XPT fleets.

The order comprises 117 bi-mode Civity carriages which will make up 10 long (6-car) trainsets for use on long-distance services linking Sydney, Melbourne and Brisbane, plus 9 short (3-car) Regional trainsets for NSW and 10 short (3-car) Intercity sets for the Southern Highlands – a total of 29 trains. The bi-mode units will enable electric operation in NSW where there are overhead catenary lines, however these trains will not use overhead electricity in Melbourne or Brisbane.

== Intercity/regional passenger locomotives ==
=== Former Stock ===
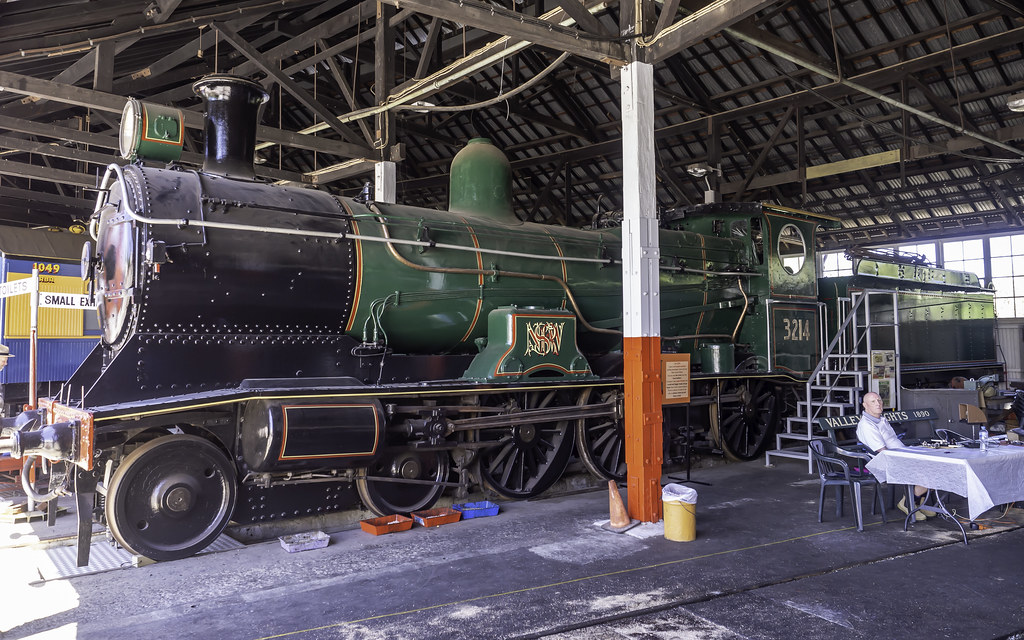
NSW 6 class locomotive 3214 built in 1892 exhibited at the Valley Heights Locomotive Depot Heritage Museum.

==== 6 Class ====
The 6 class consisted of engines 6 and 7, built in 1856. They were of a 2-2-2 wheel configuration

==== 9 Class ====
The 9 class was built in 1858 as a part passenger, part coal engine with a 2-2-2 wheel configuration.

==== G23 class ====
In 1863, Beyer, Peacock & Company delivered the first of nine G class 2-4-0s to the New South Wales Government Railways for passenger service, fitted with 5'9" driving wheels. This was followed up by the order of four additional locomotives with 5'6" driving wheels.

==== 8N Class ====
The 8N class was built for the northern sector in 1864

== Light rail ==
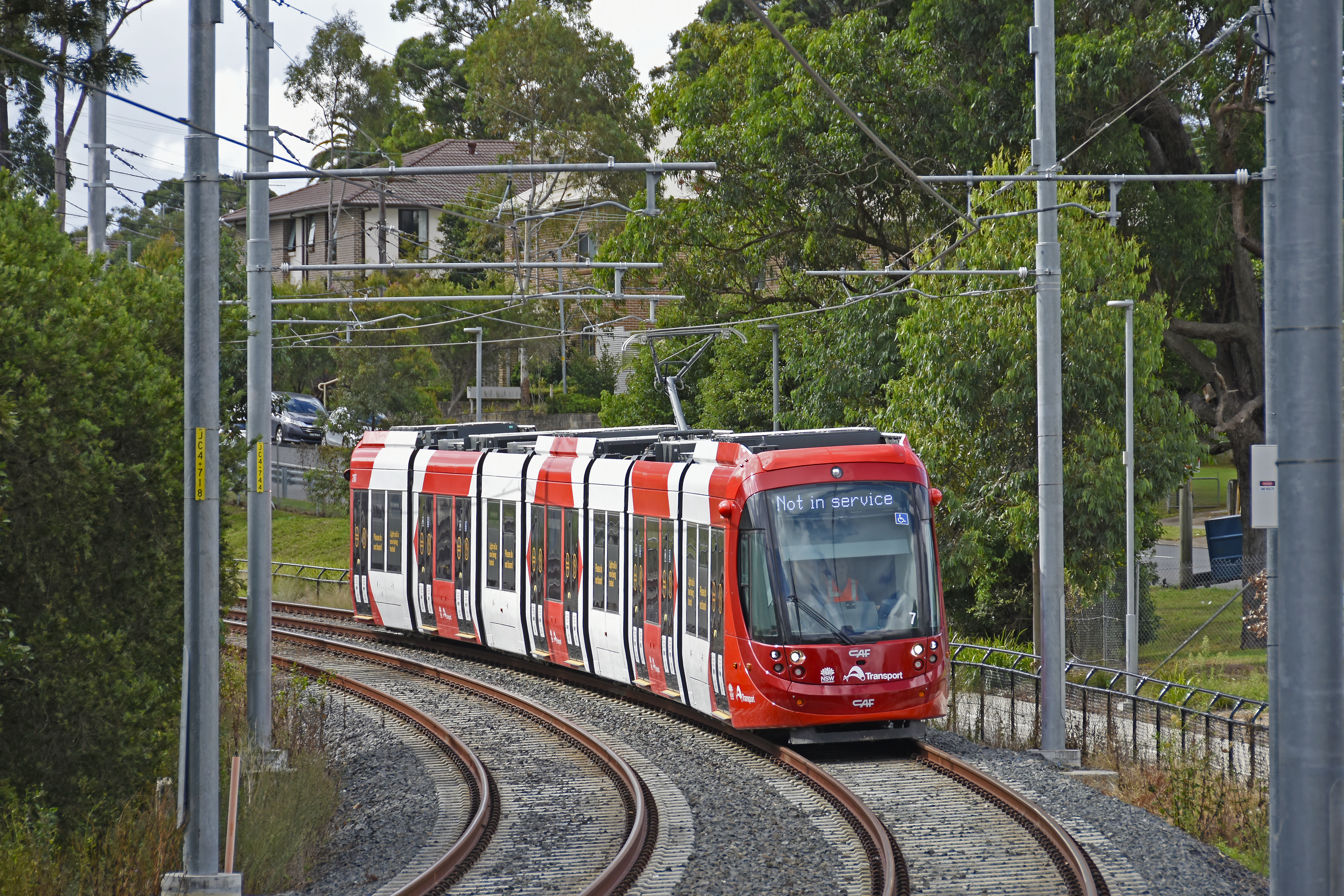
Urbos 100 on the Parramatta Light Rail

From the 1890s until the 1960s, trams ran in Sydney on what became an extensive network. In 1997, the first stage of the Inner West Light Rail opened to Lilyfield. In 2014, it was extended to Dulwich Hill, connecting with the Bankstown line. In December 2019, the Randwick branch of the CBD and South East Light Rail opened, with the Kingsford branch opening in March 2020.

The light rail systems in Sydney and Newcastle rely on their own fleets, with the Parramatta Light Rail separated from the rest of the Sydney light rail network.

== Codes ==
=== Passenger Vehicles ===
- A = sleeping
- B = first
- C = composite (first and second)
- F = second
- H = guard/brakevan
- L = lavatory
- M = Conductor's compartment (currently only used on XPT sleeping cars, coded "XAM")
- O = hostess, or staff amenities
- P = power
- R = restaurant
- HPF = guard plus power plus second, a compound code.

=== Suburban Codes ===
- C = Control Motor
- D = Driving Trailer
- N = Non Control Motor
- T = Trailer

=== Interurban Codes ===
==== V Set Interurban Intercity Double Deck ====
- DCM, DIM, DJM, DKM = Double Deck Driving Trailer (middle letter indicates car model)
- DCT, DIT, DKT = Double Deck Trailer With Toilet (middle letter indicates car model)
- DTD, D*D = Double Deck Driving Trailer With Toilet (* is any letter)

==== OSCARs ====
- OD = Driving Trailer
- ON = Non Control Motor
- ONL = Non-Control Motor With Toilet

The NIFs do have different codes to the current Intercity fleet.

=== EMU/DMU Fleet ===
Bold: Fleet in/will be in service

- A = **Waratah Series 1**, 1877 American carriage stock
- B = **Waratah Series 2**, Punchbowl red sets (Timber, Standard, Tulloch)
- BPH = Creamy Kate Railmotor
- C = Chopper C set
- CPH = Tin Hare Railmotor
- D = **Mariyung**
- DEB = 900/800 class railmotors
- E = 620/720 class railcar
- F = Flemington Red sets (Timber, Standard, Tulloch)
- G = G set Tangara, converted to T1 set in 2010
- H = **OSCAR (Outer Suburban Cars)**, Hornsby red sets (Timber, Standard, Tulloch)
- J = **Hunter Railcar**
- K = **K set**
- L = L set, post 1988
- M = Proposed for the Tangara, later changed to T set. **Millennium**, Mortdale Red sets
- N = **Endeavour** (possibly given due to the silent E in its name)
- P = **Xplorer**
- R = R set (withdrawn, converted to S set, which were subsequently withdrawn). The new sets to replace NSW TrainLink's Endeavour, Xplorer and XPT are set to be designated R set.
- S = Sputnik carriage stock (single and double deck), see W set. S set (withdrawn)
- T = 2 car S set, see L set. **Tangara** (given due to the first letter of its name)
- T1 = **Ex G sets**, compatible with T set
- U = **U Set** (given due to the curvature of the train, nicknamed U-Boats)
- V = V set (given due to its vacuum toilets)
- W = W set, post 1972. (given to free up the S allocation, possibly chosen because of the double deck coaches used in the sets, and the letter being used to signify 'double' in places such as Japan.)
- X = **XPT** (eXpress Passenger Train)
- X2 = **Tilt Train** (withdrawn)
- Y = 3 car V sets for DTRS/ATP testing – Not for passenger service (withdrawn)

== See also ==
- Rail transport in New South Wales
- Railways in Sydney
- Sydney Trains rolling stock
- NSW TrainLink rolling stock
