= New South Wales 660/760 class railcar =

660 and 760 class railcars
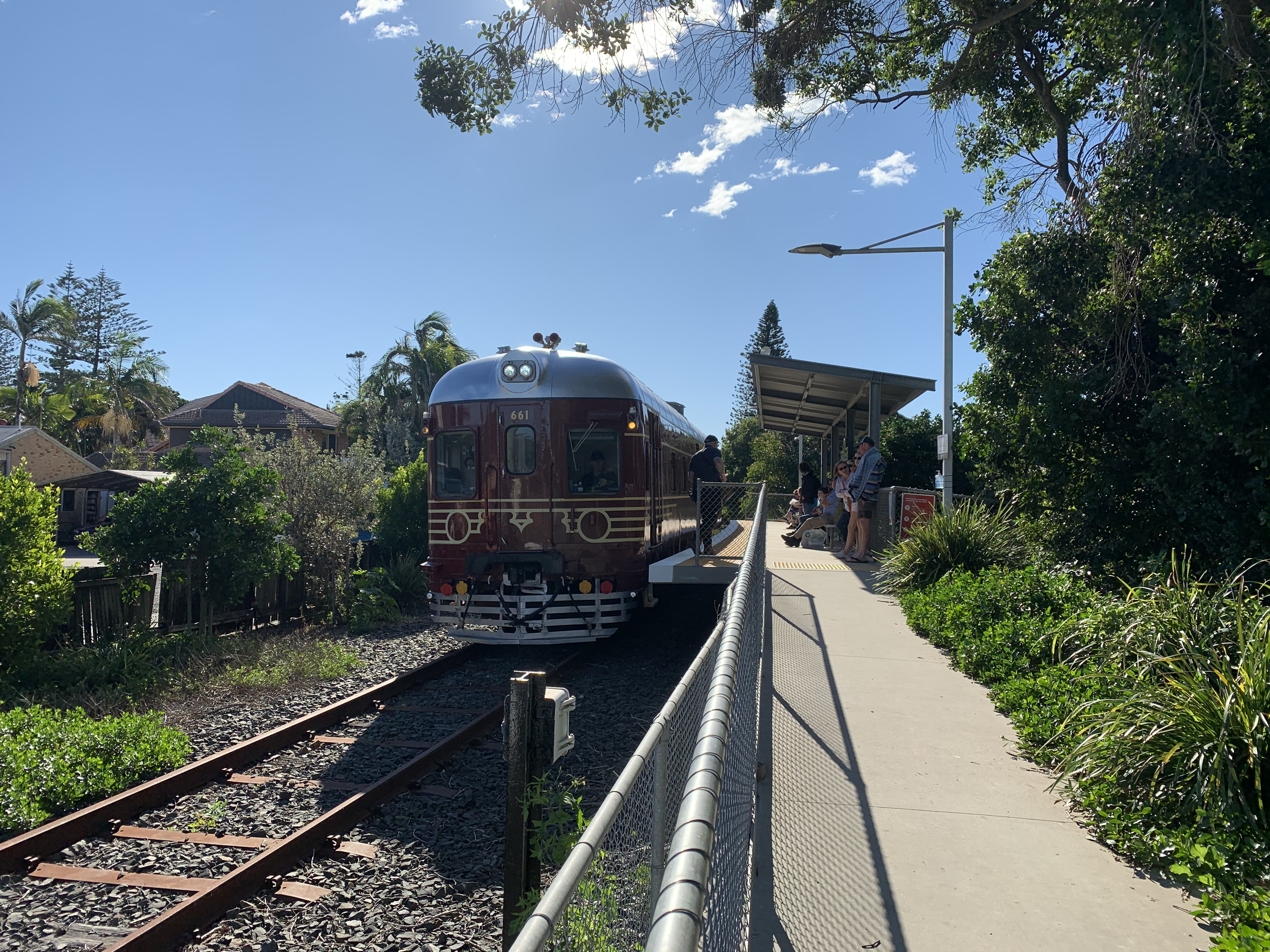
- Power car 661 at Byron Beach station in July 2020
- Stock type: Diesel multiple unit
- In service: 1972
- Manufacturer: New South Wales Government Railways
- Built at: Rolling Stock Workshops, Chullora NSW
- Constructed: 1973–1975
- Entered service: 1973–1994
- Number built: 10 (5 two-car units)
- Number preserved: At least 1 (car 661)
- Number scrapped: 3
- Fleet numbers: 661/761, 665/765, 668/768, 669/769 and 670/770
- Operator: CityRail
- Line served: Hunter line

Specifications
- Car body construction: Aluminium (Steel underframe)
- Car length: 18.67 m (61 ft 3 in)
- Width: 2,970 mm (9 ft 8 7/8 in)
- Maximum speed: 115 km/h (71 mph)
- Traction system: Diesel
- Prime mover: Cummins NT-855-R2 / Cummins NTA-855-R4
- Engine type: Diesel 300 bhp, 335 bhp
- Power output: 600 hp (450 kW) (300 hp or 220 kW x 2); 670 hp (500 kW) (335 hp or 250 kW x 2)
- Transmission: Lockup torque converter
- Braking systems: S.E.M. electro-pneumatic straight air with emergency feature, handbrake
- Track gauge: 1,435 mm (4 ft 8 1/2 in) standard gauge

The 660 and 760 class railcars are a class of diesel multiple unit train built by the New South Wales Government Railways (NSWGR) and used in the latter stages of their life by CityRail, primarily on its Hunter Valley line. The trains have since been phased out in favour of the newer Endeavour railcar model. The 660/760 railcars were converted by NSWGR from earlier 600/700 Class vehicles between 1973 and 1975.

The 600 Class railcars, built in 1949–1950, were not compatible electrically with the later 900/950 and 620 Class diesel trains. In 1972, NSWGR purchased 22 Cummins 14-litre diesel engines and Twin Disc hydraulic transmissions with the intention of re-engining the entire ten units of the class and making them compatible with their later sisters. As a result of continued mechanical failures of some of the 620 Class units, a number of these engines and transmissions were diverted to upgrade the 620 Class, and in the end only five of the ten 600 Class sets were converted.

The converted units were fitted with two 300 hp Cummins NT-855-R2 in-line six cylinder, four stroke diesel engines coupled to Twin Disc DFFR 10034 automatic lock-up torque converter transmissions. They were also fitted with 620 Class control systems and were then able to work in multiple with the 900/950 and 620 Class units. During the reconstruction, side-mounted radiators were fitted in the centre of the power car. The original window arrangement of the luggage compartment was not changed, retaining the three original windows. However, one window was removed from the No. 2 End passenger compartment to accommodate the larger radiators. The louvred side radiator vents are an aid to distinguish them from their earlier 600 Class sisters. Apart from control system and driver's cab changes, the layout of the trailer cars was unaltered.

The units were renumbered as the 660/760 Class by the simple expedient of adding 60 to their original numbers. The units converted were 601/701, 605/705, 608/708, 609/709 and 610/710. 601 becoming 661, 701 becoming 761, 605 becoming 665, etc.

Once converted, the 660/760s worked interchangeably with the 620 Class on Newcastle, Wollongong and outer Sydney suburban services. Like the 620 Class, the 660s were re-engined with more powerful 335 hp Cummins NTA-855-R4 diesel engines coupled to Voith T211r automatic lock-up torque converters in the 1980s.

All sets were withdrawn by 1994 and some have been preserved in heritage rolling stock collections.

Carriage 661 (paired with carriage 726) was leased from the Lithgow State Mine Railway by the Byron Bay Railroad Company which financially contributed to the heritage restoration of the railcar set. Volunteers at the Lithgow Railway Workshop spent thousands of voluntary hours to restore the carriages. The railcar set 661/726 returned to service with the Byron Bay Railroad Company on 16 December 2017 and currently runs along 3 km of track which is part of the 132 km Casino to Murwillumbah line.

== See also ==
- Byron Bay Train
- Rail rollingstock in New South Wales
