= State Rail Authority =

Rail transport agency in NSW, 1980–2003

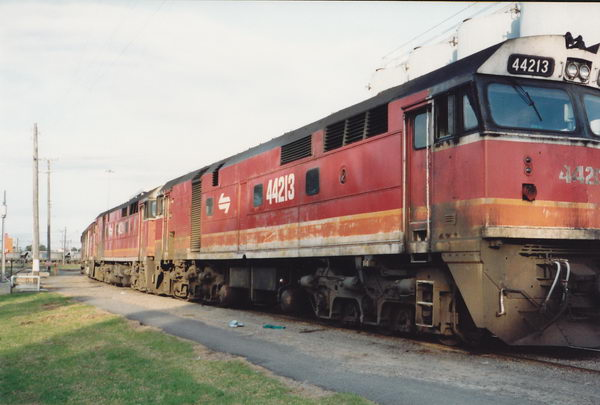
- Two 442 Class engines in State Rail livery

Statutory Authority overview
- Formed: 1 July 1980
- Preceding Statutory Authority: Public Transport Commission
- Dissolved: 31 December 2003
- Superseding Statutory Authority: RailCorp
- Jurisdiction: New South Wales
- Headquarters: Sydney
- Statutory Authority executive: David Hill, CEO
- Key document: Transport Authorities Act 1980 (NSW)

The State Rail Authority, a former statutory authority of the Government of New South Wales, operated and maintained railways in the Australian state of New South Wales from July 1980 until December 2003.

== History ==
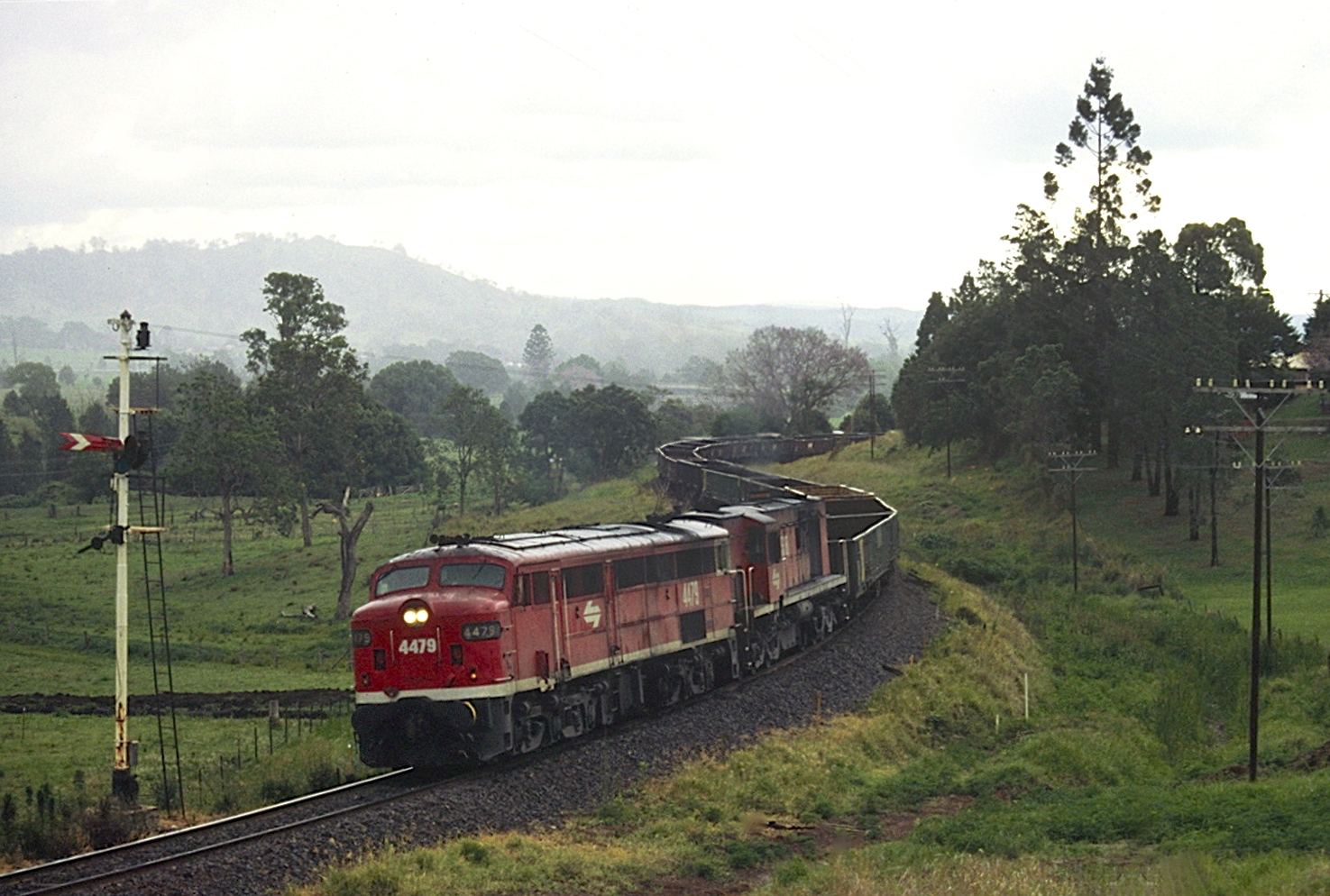
44 & 45 south of Kyogle in 1987

The Transport Authorities Act 1980 separated the functions of the Public Transport Commission (formerly responsible for all public transport) and established the State Rail Authority. The State Rail Authority assumed responsibility for trains, while the Urban Transit Authority responsibility for buses and ferries.

In July 1982 a new colour scheme developed by Phil Belbin of red, yellow, orange and white was unveiled, which was commonly referred to as the "candy colours". The L7 logo used by the Public Transport Commission was retained, albeit with the dark and light blue replaced with red and orange. Around this time, they also gave playing cards and soap to passengers.

=== Electrification ===
During its tenure the State Rail Authority completed a number of electrification projects:

- Gosford – Wyong April 1982
- Wyong – Newcastle June 1984
- Waterfall – Port Kembla February 1986
- Riverstone – Richmond August 1991
- Coniston – Dapto January 1993

=== Rolling stock ===
The State Rail Authority introduced new 80 Class, 81 Class and 86 Class locomotives used on both freight and country passenger services, K set, C set, Tangara, Millennium and V set double deck electric passenger trains and the XPT. It also placed an order for the 82 Class and 90 Class locomotives that were delivered to FreightRail in 1994. A fleet of Denning and Scania coaches was purchased to replace withdrawn country rail services.

Inherited Locomotives
Name	Image	Build Year	Withdrawn
42 Class	4201 in 2017	1955/1956	1983
421 Class	42103 and GM22	1965/1966	1986
422 Class		1969/1970	n/a
44 Class	Several 44 Class locomotives	1957/1967	1997
442 Class		1970/1973	1994
45 Class	4520 in its Indian red livery	1962/1964	1994
47 Class	4705	1972/1973	1989
48 Class	A pair of 48 Class Locomotives	1959/1970	n/a
49 Class	4916	1960/1964	1995, later 1997
70 Class	7002 in its Indian red livery	1960/1961	1986
73 Class	7318	1970/1973	1987/1990
80 Class	8008 in its Indian red livery	1979/1983	2003
X100 Class	X101	1962	1992
46 Class	4639	1956/1958	1996
85 Class		1979/1980	1998

Inherited Railmotors and Multiple Units
Name	Image	Build Year	Withdrawn
CPH		1923	1985
BPH		1934	1983
Silver City Comet	DP 104	1937	1989
FP	FP8	1967	1986
400/500 Class		1938	1983
600/700 Class		1949/1950	1994
620/720 Class		1961	2007
660/760 Class		1973	1994
DEB Set	HPF 954	1951/1960	1994
1100 Class		1961	1993
1200 Class		1970	1993
Standard Suburban Stock	F1	1925/1926	1992
Tulloch Single Deck Stock		1950	1993
W set "Sputnik"	Preserved carriage C3702	1957	1993
U Set "U Boat"		1958	1996
Tulloch Double Deck Stock		1964	1980/2004
V Sets	V25	1970	2025–2026
S Sets	An S set prior to refurbishment	1972	2019

Inherited Coach Stock
Name	Image	Build Year	Withdrawn
S Type		1935	1989
N Type		1939	late 1980s
HUB Type	FH 2230	1948	1994, later 2000
RUB Type		1949	1994, later 2000
Stainless Type		1961	1993

Pre-Booz Locomotives, Multiple Units and Coaches
Name	Image	Build Year	Withdrawn
81 Class	8120	1982/1986	n/a
XPT	XP2009	1982	n/a, proposed 2027
K Set	R16 (original classification)	1981	2025–2026
C Set		1986	2021
T Set "Tangara"		1988	n/a
86 Class	8649	1983/1985	2002

Post-Booz Locomotives and Multiple Units
Name	Image	Build Year	Withdrawn
82 Class	8223	1994/1995	n/a
90 Class		1994	n/a
PL Class		1999/2001	n/a
Xplorer	P2	1993	n/a proposed 2027
Endeavour	N3	1992	n/a proposed 2027
G Set	G6	1994	converted to T sets in 2010
M Set	M32	2002/2005	n/a proposed 2040

=== Booz Allen Hamilton review and restructure ===
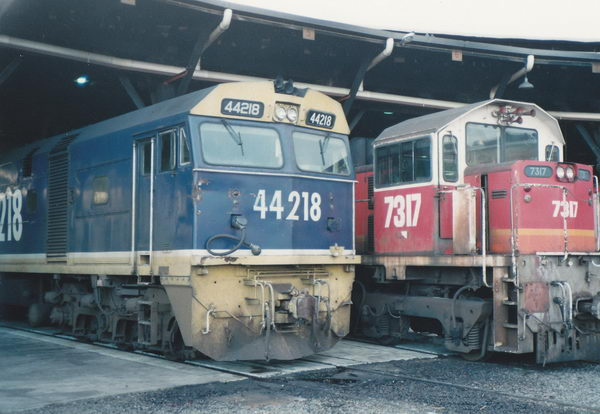
44218 in FreightCorp livery alongside 7317 in the candy livery at Broadmeadow Locomotive Depot circa 1990

Following the election of the Greiner State Government in March 1988, consultants Booz Allen Hamilton were commissioned to prepare a report into NSW rail services. In November 1988, before the report was complete, the North Coast Overnight Express to Grafton, the Northern Mail to Moree and Tenterfield, the Bathurst day train, the Western Mail to Dubbo and the Canberra Monaro Express to Cooma all ceased.

After receiving the Booz Allen Hamilton report, the government released its response in July 1989 under the title CountryLink 2000. It was announced the number of staff employed on country rail operations would fall from 18,000 to 10,000, including the withdrawal of staff from 94 country railway stations and the Nyngan – Bourke, Queanbeyan – Cooma and Glen Innes – Wallangarra lines would close.

Several country passenger services ceased over the next few years including the Silver City Comet, Northern Tablelands Express, Canberra XPT, Brisbane Limited, Pacific Coast Motorail, South Coast Daylight Express, Intercapital Daylight and Sydney/Melbourne Express. These were replaced either by XPT sets, EMU/DMU sets or coaches. Coach services which had been operated by the State Rail Authority's own fleet were contracted out to private operators. The report had recommended closing all country passenger services as they were judged unviable, however this was not politically acceptable.

The State Rail Authority was divided into business units:

- CityRail: responsible for suburban and interurban passenger services
- CountryLink: responsible for country passenger services
- FreightRail: responsible for freight services
- Rail Estate: responsible for rail property

CityRail adopted a blue and yellow colour scheme including L7 logo, CountryLink a blue, white and grey scheme and FreightRail a blue and yellow scheme.

=== July 1996 restructure ===
On 1 July 1996, the State Rail Authority was restructured into four distinct entities by the Transport Administration Amendment (Rail Corporatisation and Restructuring) Act 1996 to separate infrastructure from operations as required by the Competition Policy Reform Act 1995. This was part of the process of moving to an open access regime.

The entities were:

- Freight Rail Corporation: responsible for freight services
- Rail Access Corporation: responsible for managing track and providing access to public and private operators
- Railway Services Authority: responsible for track and rolling stock maintenance
- State Rail Authority: passenger service operator consisting of CityRail and CountryLink

=== February 1998 restructure ===
Another restructure in February 1998 saw the State Rail Authority split into four operating divisions:

- CityRail Stations
- CountryLink
- Operations
- Passenger Fleet Maintenance

=== January 2001 restructure ===
In January 2001, the Rail Access Corporation and Railway Services Authority were merged into the Rail Infrastructure Corporation that took responsibility for ownership and maintenance of the infrastructure.

=== January 2004 restructure and wind down ===
In January 2004, after much criticism and public perceptions of blame shifting between units for operational failings, RailCorp was formed taking over the passenger train operations from the residual State Rail Authority (CityRail and CountryLink) and responsibility for maintaining the greater metropolitan network from the Rail Infrastructure Corporation.

By June 2006 much of the operational function had been transferred, with the State Rail Authority in the process of being wound down.

== Publication ==
From September 1981 until June 1989, State Wide was the SRA's inhouse journal.

== See also ==
- RailCorp
