= Byron Bay Train =

Solar-powered train in Australia

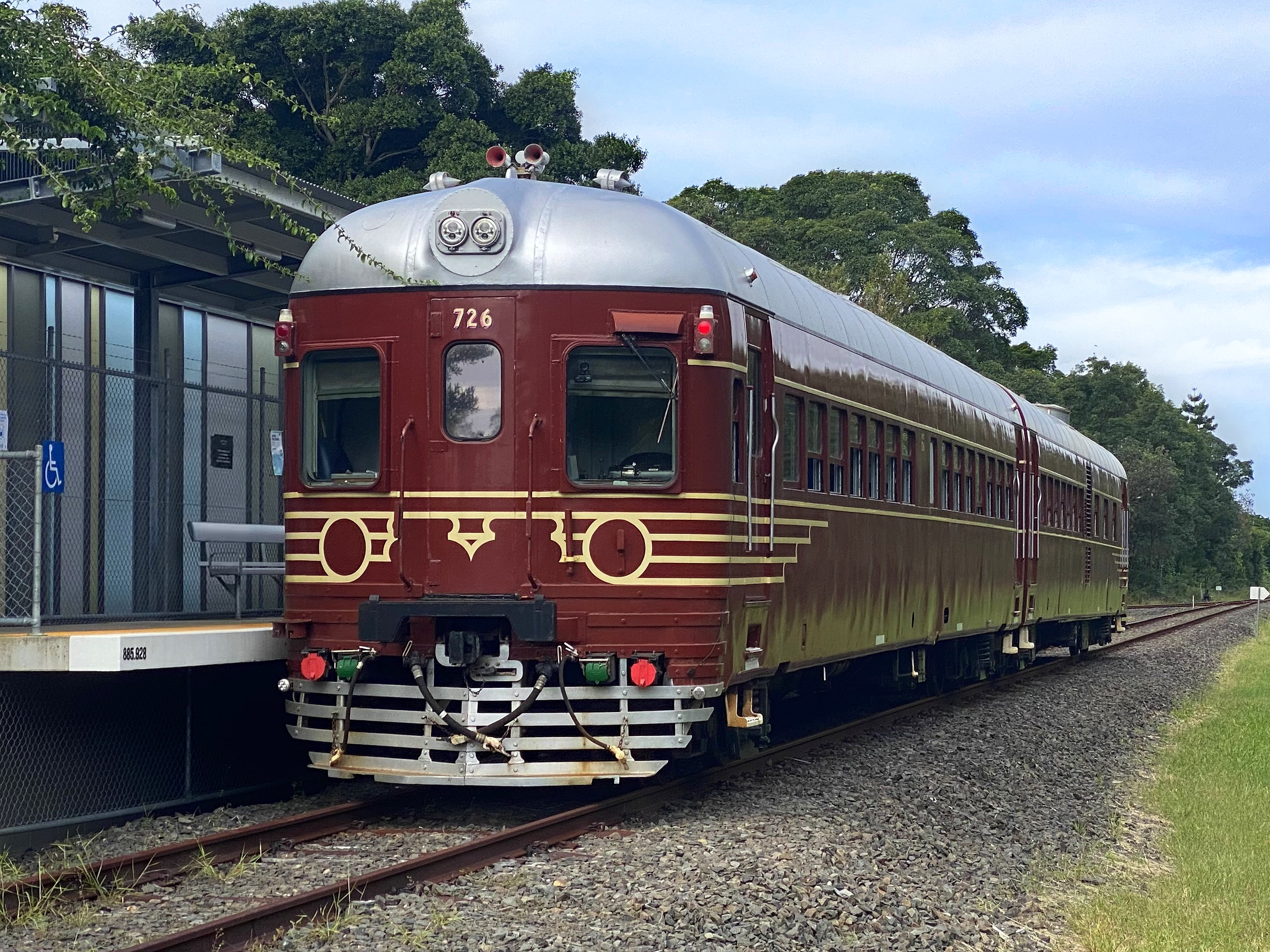
- 726 and 661 at Byron Bay North Beach station in April 2022

Overview
- Owner: Elements Beach Resort, North Byron
- Locale: Byron Bay
- Transit type: Shuttle
- Number of lines: 1
- Number of stations: 2
- Website: Byron Bay Train

Operation
- Began operation: 16 December 2017; 8 years ago

Technical
- System length: 3 km (1.9 mi)
- Track gauge: 1,435 mm (4 ft 8 1/2 in) standard gauge

The Byron Bay Train is a not-for-profit passenger rail service in Byron Bay, New South Wales, Australia. Since commencing in December 2017, it operates on a three-kilometre section of the largely disused Casino-Murwillumbah line.

A 1949-built 660 class railcar and 720 class railcar was converted to solar power for use on the service.

== History ==
The first section of the Murwillumbah line (which the Byron Bay Train uses) opened in 1894 between Lismore and Murwillumbah, connecting the Richmond and Tweed rivers. Passengers and goods were transported to Sydney by coastal shipping from Byron Bay. Nine years later, an extension from Lismore to Casino opened (and later south to Grafton – it was not until 1932 that the line was fully connected to Sydney). The line became a branch line when in 1930, the North Coast line was extended from Kyogle to South Brisbane. The Casino-Murwillumbah railway was closed in 2004, with the last NSW CountryLink XPT train leaving Murwillumbah on 15 May 2004.

The section of track to the north of the town centre was fully restored by private investment at a cost of about $300,000 per kilometre. Track work on the section commenced on 23 May 2016 and was completed in late November that year. New platforms and a storage shed were completed in April 2017. It was confirmed in early January 2017, the train would run on solar-hybrid operation. The solar-powered service is believed to be a world first.

Operations commenced on 16 December 2017. The service carried over 10,000 passengers in its first 19 days. Just over a year later, in January 2019, the train carried its 100,000th passenger.

== Train ==
The Byron Bay Railroad Company operates a single railmotor. Power car 661, along with trailer 761, was built at Chullora Railway Workshops in 1949 as 601/701. In 1973, it was upgraded with its GM Detroit Diesel 6/71 engines replaced with Cummins NT855-R2 engines and was subsequently renumbered 661/761. Withdrawn by the State Rail Authority in the early 1990s, it was sold to the Lithgow State Mine Heritage Park & Railway.

After 761 was destroyed by a bushfire, the 1960s-built trailer 726 was acquired as a replacement. It was restored to service in 2015 and operated a few charters on the Gwabegar line to Rylstone and Main Western line to Tarana. In 2017, it was converted to solar-hybrid operation. The conversion was completed in October 2017, and the railmotor was moved from Lithgow by road, arriving on 3 November 2017. Electricity will be supplied from the grid when there is insufficient solar and the train is intended to run on diesel fuel about once a week.

The railmotor has a seating capacity of 100 people. It is believed to be the world's first solar-powered train.

== Stations ==
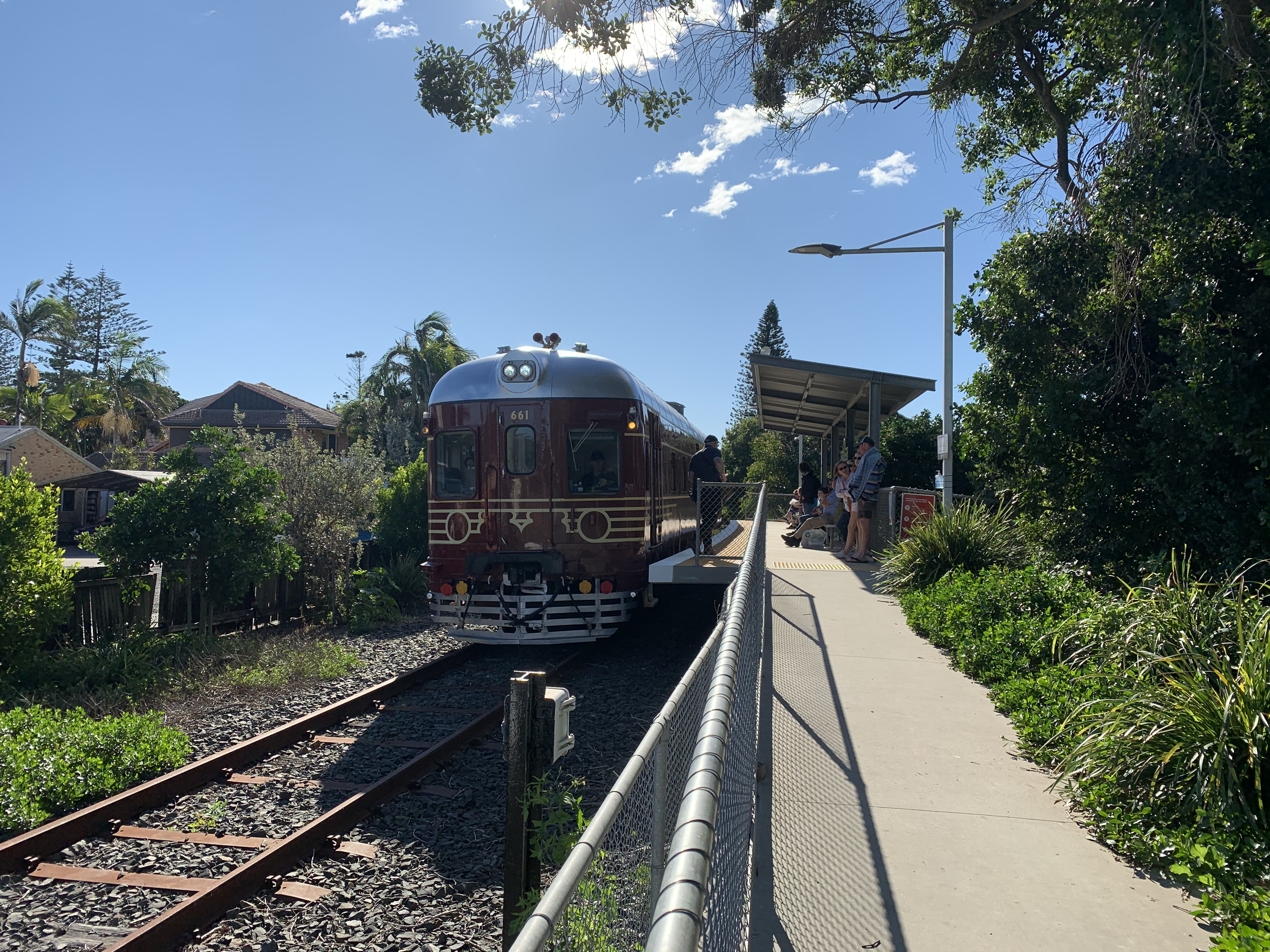
Byron Beach station, July 2020

The train operates a return shuttle between North Beach station located in Sunrise Beach and Byron Beach station, which serves the beach and Byron township. Due to the service not being subsidised by the government, the timetable will be reviewed from time to time. The train contains room for bikes, prams and surfboards, which can be carried free of charge. It does not use the existing station as this would have required the reinstatement of a level crossing.

The North Beach station is located on Bayshore Drive, near the Sun Bistro Tavern and Elements of Byron Resort. The Byron Beach station is located on the northern side of the Lawson Street level crossing in the Byron Bay CBD.

== Ticketing ==
Passengers aged 0–4 years ride free, with those aged 4–14 travelling for $5 one way or $8 return, and passengers fifteen and up travelling for $8 on a one-way or $12 return journey. A 10-ride adult ticket is available for $45.

== Criticism ==
The line is owned by the Byron Bay Railroad Company, which is owned and funded by the owners of Elements of Byron Resorts. It was criticised by Sunrise Progress Association president, Raphael Lee Cass, for its call for volunteers, when the owner was a multi-millionaire, already paying the drivers.
