= Red rattler =

Red rattler may refer to:

- Crotalus ruber, a venomous pit viper species found in the United States and Mexico
- A colloquial term for a single-deck vintage suburban train from Sydney built between 1925 and 1960, most notably the pre-war Standard type built between 1925 and 1937
- A slang term for a Tait train, a vintage suburban train from Melbourne
- A colloquial term for a New South Wales 620/720 class railcar
