= Canberra Monaro Express =

Former railway service in Australia

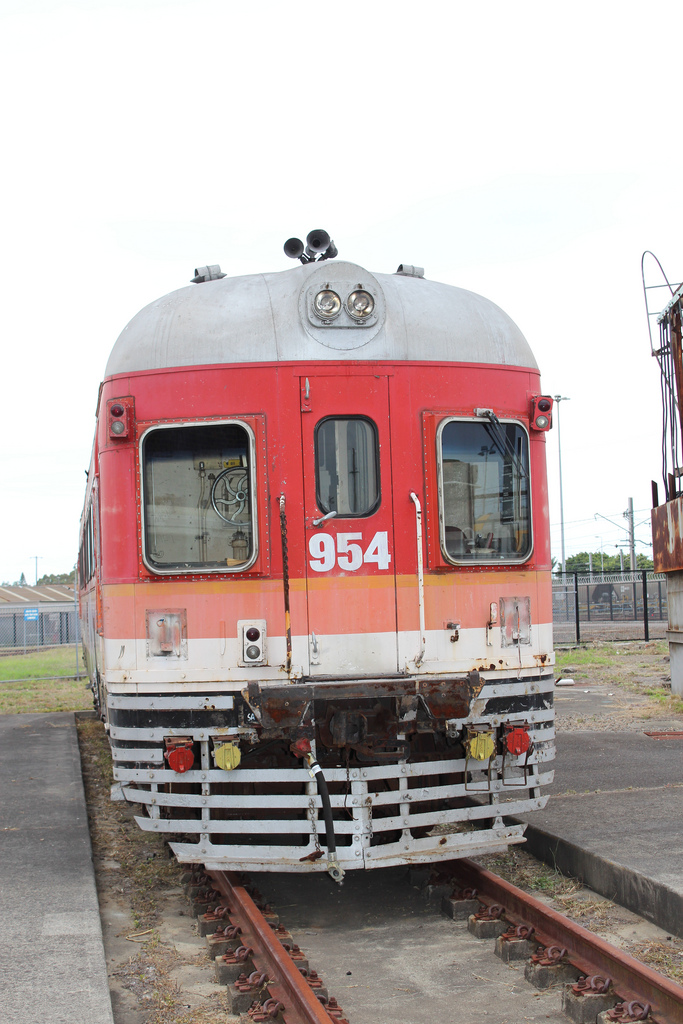
- DEB set carriage at Broadmeadow Locomotive Depot in December 2012

Overview
- Service type: Passenger train
- Status: Ceased
- Predecessor: Federal City Express
- First service: 9 May 1955
- Last service: 26 September 1988
- Former operator: State Rail Authority

Route
- Termini: Sydney; Canberra; Cooma
- Distance travelled: 435 kilometres (270 mi)
- Service frequency: Daily in each direction
- Train number: S37/S38
- Lines used: Main South; Bombala

Technical
- Rolling stock: DEB sets

The Canberra Monaro Express was a passenger train service that operated by the New South Wales Government Railways between Sydney, Canberra and Cooma from May 1955 until September 1988.

It was formed by two four-carriage DEB railcar sets and replaced the steam-hauled Federal City Express.

After departing Sydney Central, it travelled via the Main South line to Goulburn where it branched off to Queanbeyan. There the train divided, with one set going to Canberra, and the other to Cooma.

The train normally consisted of two DEB railcar sets of four carriages. In July 1973 it was cut back to a single four-carriage set serving both Canberra and Cooma, sometimes with a non air-conditioned 620/720 set attached when demand warranted. Reliability problems with the DEB sets saw locomotive hauled trains take over the service between June 1981 and August 1982. In the State Rail Authority era it was built up to seven-carriage DEB sets serving Canberra and Cooma, before the old practice of dividing the train at Queanbeyan, with three cars going to Cooma, was reverted to in March 1986. The final Canberra Monaro Express ran on 26 September 1988.
