= New South Wales 600/700 class railcar =

Retired train in Australia

600/700 Class Railcars
- Manufacturer: New South Wales Government Railways
- Built at: Chullora Railway Workshops
- Constructed: 1949–1950
- Refurbished: 1973-1975 five two-car sets converted to 660/760s
- Number built: 20 (10 two-car sets)
- Number in service: 1 (Byron Bay Train)
- Number scrapped: 7
- Formation: 1 powercar, 1 driving trailer
- Fleet numbers: 601/701 - 610/710
- Operator: New South Wales Government Railways

Specifications
- Car body construction: Aluminium body on steel underframe
- Car length: 18.67 m (61 ft 3 in)
- Width: 2,970 mm (9 ft 8 7/8 in)
- Height: 3,920 mm (12 ft 10 3/8 in)
- Maximum speed: 100 km/h (62 mph)
- Traction system: Diesel-hydraulic
- Prime mover: Two GM Detroit Diesel 6/71
- Engine type: 6-cylinder diesels
- Power output: 330 hp (246 kW) (165 hp or 123 kW x 2)
- Transmission: Allison automatic lockup torque converter
- Braking systems: S.E.M. electro-pneumatic straight air with emergency feature, handbrake
- Track gauge: 1,435 mm (4 ft 8 1/2 in) standard gauge

The 600/700 class railcars are a class of diesel multiple unit built by the New South Wales Government Railways. They were built to operate on branch lines from 1949, with low traffic volumes later being transferred to Newcastle and Wollongong to operate suburban services until withdrawn in 1994.

== Construction ==
In January 1946, approval was given for the construction of 10 two car sets. It was decided that they would be constructed at the new New South Wales Government Railways' Chullora Railway Workshops. They were built with an aluminium body on a steel frame. Each consisted of a 600 class powercar and 700 class driving trailer. They were powered by two General Motors 6/71 diesels coupled to an Allison TCLA 655 hydraulic transmission. The power car had 32 economy seats and had provision for eight tonnes of luggage while the trailer seated 24 in economy and 26 in first class. The 600/700s were capable of operating in multiple together and there was at least one instance of four sets operating together.

== In service ==
The first entered service on 25 January 1949 with all initially deployed on lines throughout country NSW including:

- Queanbeyan to Bombala
- Goulburn to Cootamundra
- Cootamundra to Griffith, Lake Cargelligo and Tumut
- Wallerawang to Mudgee
- Dubbo to Cobar, Brewarrina, Bourke, Coonamble and Gwabegar
- Werris Creek to Gwabegar, Moree and Walgett
- Armidale to Glen Innes

With the introduction of the DEB set railcars on the Northern Tablelands Express, in April 1959 one was transferred to Newcastle for suburban working being joined by a second from Dubbo. In the mid 1960s some were transferred to Richmond and Wollongong.

In 1971, 22 Cummins NT-855-R2 engines were purchased with the intention of repowering all ten to allow them to operate in multiple with the later 620/720 and DEB set railcars. However, only five were converted also receiving new bogies and being renumbered as 660/760s the other engines being used to repower 620/720s.

In November 1983, the final three were withdrawn from rural services from Cootamundra to Lake Cargelligo and Tumut, and from Narrandera to Hay and Tocumwal. They were transferred to Acdep and from November 1984 operated services from between Riverstone and Richmond with a few services starting back at Sydney Central. The other seven were all operating out of Newcastle and Wollongong by this stage and had their seating replaced with throwover suburban seating. The Richmond cars were withdrawn following the electrification of the line in August 1991 and the rest when replaced by Endeavour railcars in 1994.

Of the 600/700 sets, five cars were scrapped (two [603 and 703] following their partial destruction for an episode of the Australian Broadcasting Corporation television series Police Rescue in February 1992) and four were sold to The Rail Motor Society, Paterson. Vandals burnt out 702 and damaged 602 at Mortdale before they were transferred to the Rail Motor Society. The partially stripped body shells of 604 and 704 were given to the Society in compensation and after further stripping of parts they were later sold to the local Court House Hotel at Paterson for accommodation. In February 2020, the Hotel was being renovated for sale and the two carriage bodies were sold privately, one to Queensland and one to Victoria (Australia). The remains of 702 were scrapped and the other three cars (602, 606 and 707) all survive in near original condition in the collection of the Rail Motor Society. As of 2022, 602 and 707 are being restored to operational condition by The Rail Motor Society.

Of the 660/760s, 661/761 and 668/768 were sold to the Lithgow State Mine Heritage Park & Railway, 665/765 to the New England Railway, Armidale and 670/770 to the Valley Heights Locomotive Depot Heritage Museum.

661/726 have since been converted to operate on Solar power and now runs on a restored 3 km (1.9 mi) section of the former Murwullimbah - Casino line at Byron Bay from North Beach to Byron Beach stations.

== See also ==
- Rail rollingstock in New South Wales
