= CityRail =

Former Sydney passenger rail network operator

- The L7 logo of CityRail

Agency overview
- Formed: 16 January 1989
- Dissolved: 30 June 2013
- Superseding agencies: Sydney Trains; NSW TrainLink
- Jurisdiction: New South Wales
- Headquarters: Sydney
- Parent agency: State Rail Authority (1989–2003); RailCorp (2004–2013)
- Key document: Transport Administration Act, 1988 (NSW)
- Website: www.cityrail.info

CityRail was a passenger railway brand operated by the State Rail Authority from 1989 to 2003 and by RailCorp from 2004 to 2013 with services in and around Sydney, Newcastle and Wollongong, the three largest cities in New South Wales, Australia. It was established in January 1989 and abolished in June 2013 when it was superseded by Sydney Trains and NSW TrainLink.

In June 2013, it operated 307 stations and over 2,060 kilometres of track, extending north to the upper Hunter Valley, south to the Shoalhaven and Southern Highlands regions and west to Bathurst. In the year ended 30 June 2012, 306 million journeys were made on the network.

== History ==
=== Structure ===
The final logo of CityRail used until 2013

CityRail was established pursuant to the Transport Administration Act, 1988 (NSW), and was first mentioned as an entity distinct from the State Rail Authority in the Parliament of New South Wales by then governor James Rowland on 21 February 1990. CityRail adopted a blue and yellow version of the State Rail Authority L7 logo, to fit into its new blue and yellow colour scheme. This logo continued to be in use until 2010, when it was replaced by the Waratah logo of the NSW Government.

On 1 January 2004, RailCorp assumed all functions of the State Rail Authority, and later the functions of the Rail Infrastructure Corporation and Rail Access Corporation. This resulted in CityRail becoming a subsidiary of RailCorp, along with CountryLink. CityRail became defunct on 1 July 2013, with Sydney Trains taking over suburban services and NSW TrainLink taking over Intercity and regional services.

=== Operational history ===
When the CityRail brand was introduced the State Rail Authority was part way through taking delivery of 450 Tangara carriages. With these new carriages in service, the last single deck suburban sets were withdrawn in 1992, and the last U set interurban sets were withdrawn in 1996.

In February 1994, the first of 15 two-carriage Endeavour railcars was delivered. These replaced Class 620/720 railcars, Class 900 railcars and locomotive-hauled stock.

In May 2000, the Airport railway line opened to CityRail services. In July 2002, the first of 141 M set carriages entered service. In November 2006, the first of seven two-carriage Hunter railcar trains entered service.

In December 2006, the first of 221 Oscar carriages entered service on the South Coast Line. In February 2009, the Epping to Chatswood railway line opened with shuttle services and was integrated into the Northern Line service later that year.

In July 2011, the first Waratah trains entered service to replace the S sets, although it was announced in 2013 that some S sets would stay. In October 2012, a new service from Bathurst to Sydney commenced.

== Operations ==
=== Fleet ===
At the time of its cessation in June 2013, CityRail operated eight electric multiple unit classes for suburban and interurban working and two diesel multiple unit classes. All CityRail electric trains used 1500 V DC overhead electrification and travel on 1,435mm standard gauge tracks. Double deck rollingstock was first introduced in 1964 and after 1996, all electric multiple units were double deck.

Class	Image	Type	Top speed		Carriages	Entered Service	Formation
Class	Image	Type	km/h	mph	Carriages	Entered Service	Formation
V sets		Electric multiple unit	115	71	204	1970–1989	4 cars
S sets		Electric multiple unit	115	71	509	1972–1980	4 cars
K sets		Electric multiple unit	115	71	160	1981–1985	4 cars
C sets		Electric multiple unit	115	71	56	1986–1987	4 cars
T sets		Electric multiple unit	115	71	447	1988–1995	4 cars
Endeavour railcars		Diesel multiple unit	160	99	28	1994–1996	2 cars
M sets		Electric multiple unit	130	81	140	2002–2005	4 cars
Hunter railcars		Diesel multiple unit	160	99	14	2006–2007	2 cars
H sets		Electric multiple unit	130	81	220	2006–2012	4 cars
A sets		Electric multiple unit	130	81	626	2011–2014	8 cars

=== Former fleet ===
The following table consists of trains that were in the CityRail fleet which were withdrawn prior to CityRail's demise:

Type	Image	In service	Notes
Standard suburban carriage stock		1925–1992	Also known as Red Rattlers. Several preserved.
Tulloch suburban carriage stock		1940–1992	Also known as Red Rattlers. Several preserved.
W sets		1957–1993	Also known as Red Rattlers or Sputniks. Several preserved.
900/800 class railcar		1951–1994	Several preserved.
U set		1958–1996	Also known as U-Boats. Several preserved.
Tulloch double deck carriage stock		1964–2004	Operated with single and double-deck power cars. Several preserved.
620/720 class railcar		1961–2007	Several preserved.
422 Class		1969/70–1994 (passenger service)	Several in freight operation, several scrapped.
44 Class		1957–1994 (passenger service)	Several in operation, several scrapped, several preserved
RUB type carriage stock		1949–1994 (CityRail service)	Several scrapped, several preserved

The CityRail network was divided into three sectors, based around three maintenance depots. EMU trainsets were identified by target plates, which are exhibited on the front lower nearside of driving carriages. Target designations and set numbers were used in identifying EMU trainsets. The composition and formations of trainsets, and the target designations were subject to alteration.

CityRail maintenance sectors
Sector #	Depot	Serviced lines	Target plate
1	Mortdale	Eastern Suburbs & Illawarra and South Coast	Red
2	Flemington	Airport & East Hills, Bankstown, Carlingford, Cumberland, Inner West, Olympic Park and South	Blue
3	Hornsby	North Shore, Northern, Western, Central Coast and Blue Mountains	Black

All V sets which operated on the Newcastle and Blue Mountains lines, were serviced at Flemington Depot. All M and H sets, which had a green target plate, were serviced at Eveleigh Maintenance Centre.

=== Ticketing ===
For most of the brand's life CityRail's ticketing system was the Automated Fare Collection System (AFC). Dating from 1992, it was based on magnetic stripe technology and was interoperable with the Sydney Buses and Sydney Ferries systems. In later years the network was incorporated into the MyZone ticketing system, which retained the AFC technology but extended the validity of multi-modal tickets to private buses and light rail.

Unlike the ticketing systems of other cities in Australia, most of CityRail's ticket prices were calculated on the distance travelled, and were proven to be the most expensive tickets of any major city public transport system.

=== Performance ===
According to the 2003 Parry Report, "The interaction of metropolitan, suburban, intercity and freight lines and services has resulted in an overly complex system. This complexity has contributed in part to the organisation being widely criticised for poor reliability and safety. CityRail was also enormously expensive".

On-time running improved after new timetables were introduced in 2005 and 2006. The newly introduced timetable increased station dwell and journey times.

In October 2012, a report published by PricewaterhouseCoopers found CityRail performed poorly compared to many metro services from 27 other major world cities. Sydney was ranked as the fourth-worst public train system while being proven to have the most expensive tickets of any major city public transport system.

=== Patronage ===
The following table lists patronage figures for the network during the corresponding financial year. Australia's financial years start on 1 July and end on 30 June. Expansions and contractions of the network and major events that affected the number of journeys made are included as notes.

CityRail patronage by financial year from 1991 to 1992
1990s	Year		1991–92	1992–93	1993–94	1994–95	1995–96	1996–97	1997–98	1998–99	1999–2000
1990s	Patronage (millions)		243.8	229.8	234.8	249.6	256.4 (Note: Pippita services ceased in October 1995)	264.7 (Note: Cumberland Line services introduced in November 1996)	266.5 (Note: Olympic Park railway line opened in March 1998)	270.5	278.7 (Note: Airport railway line opened in May 2000)
1990s	Reference										
2000s	Year	2000–01	2001–02	2002–03	2003–04	2004–05	2005–06	2006–07	2007–08	2008–09	2009–10
2000s	Patronage (millions)	302.6 (Note: Sydney Olympic and Paralympic games held in September and October 2000)	276.4	273.4	273.3	270.3	273.7	281.5	296.1	292.2 (Note: Epping to Chatswood railway line opened in February 2009)	289.1
2000s	Reference										
2010s	Year	2010–11	2011–12	2012–13							
2010s	Patronage (millions)	294.5	304.2	306.2 (Note: Bathurst services introduced in October 2012)							
2010s	Reference										
View source data.

== Network ==
CityRail operated eleven suburban lines, four intercity services, one regional service, and five connecting bus services, plus a late night bus service across metropolitan Sydney.

=== Suburban lines ===
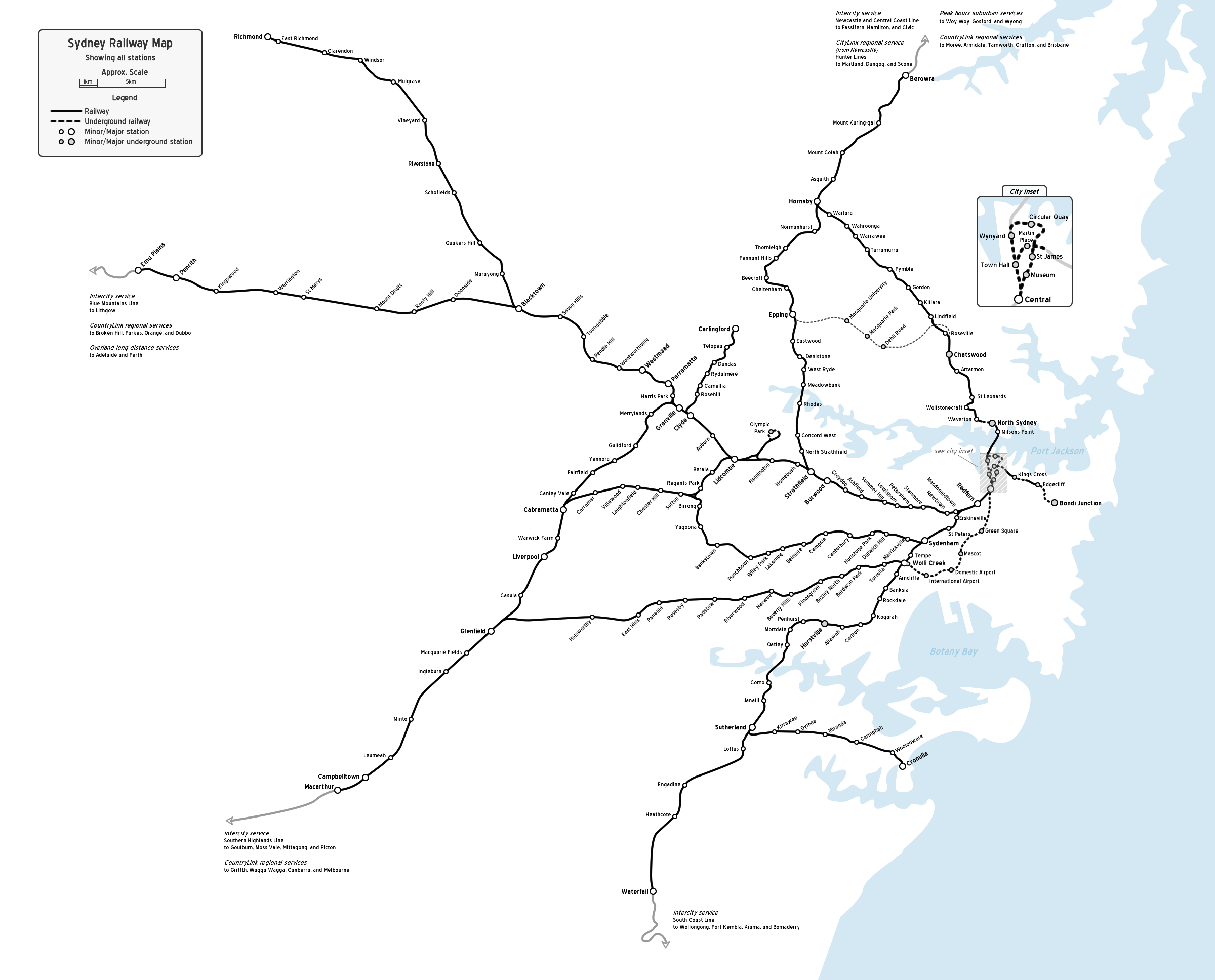
CityRail Suburban network

Line colour and name	Between	Train Types
Airport & East Hills Line	City Circle and Macarthur and Kingsgrove(peak) via either Sydenham (peak) or Airport	S, K, C, M & T sets
Bankstown Line	City Circle and Liverpool or Lidcombe, via Bankstown	S, K, C, M & T sets
Carlingford Line	Clyde and Carlingford, with limited services to Lidcombe and Central (i)	S, K, C, M & T sets
Cumberland Line	Blacktown and Campbelltown	S, K, C, M & T sets
Eastern Suburbs & Illawarra Line	Bondi Junction and Waterfall or Cronulla	T, S, K & C set
Inner West Line	City Circle and Bankstown or Liverpool (peak), via Regents Park	S, K, C, M & T sets
Northern Line	Epping and Hornsby via Strathfield, Central and Macquarie Park	S, K, C & T set
North Shore Line	Central and Berowra via Gordon	S, K, C & T set
Olympic Park Line	Lidcombe and Olympic Park. Some services operated between Central (i) and Olympic Park, particularly during special events	S, K, C, M & T sets
South Line	City Circle and Campbelltown, via Granville	S, K, C, M & T sets
Western Line	Central and Emu Plains or Richmond via Parramatta	S, K, C & T set

:*In peak hour on the North Shore Line, some outer-suburban services run to Gosford and Wyong, and some Western Line services extended to Springwood.
:*Inbound Inner West and South services generally travelled around the City Circle in the clockwise direction. Inbound Airport & East Hills and Bankstown services generally travelled around the City Circle in the anti-clockwise direction.

*Central (i) is a standard abbreviation used on timetables and station screens. It signifies Central's country and intercity platforms [formerly platforms 1–15, now 1–12].

=== Intercity lines ===
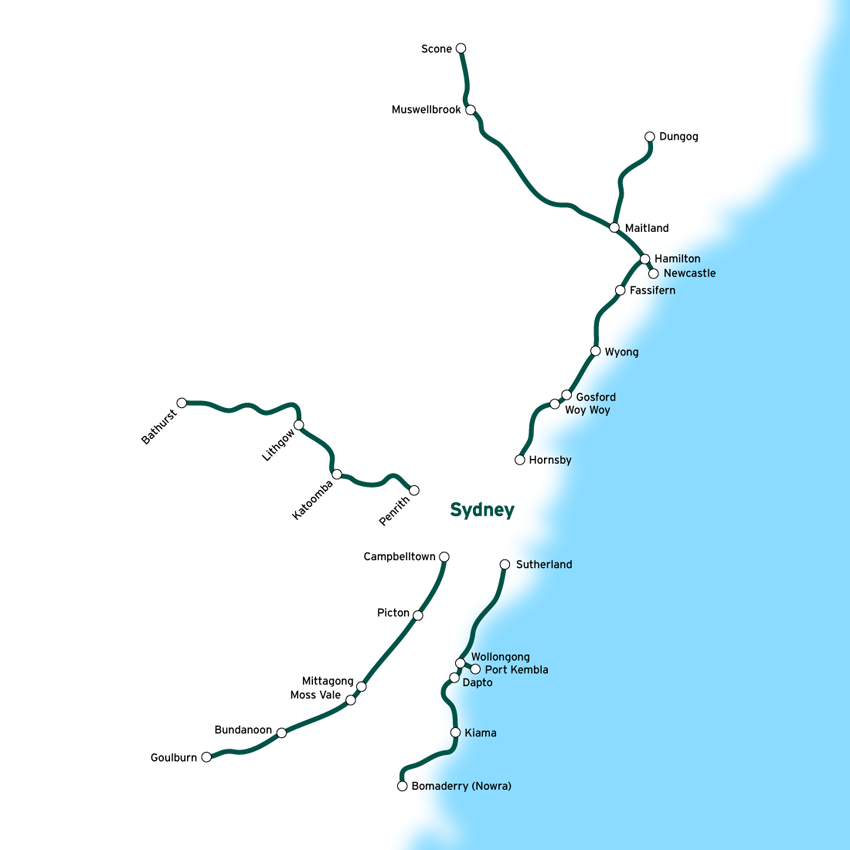
CityRail Intercity and regional network separated from the suburban network

Line colour and name	Between	Train Types
Blue Mountains Line	Central and Lithgow, with limited services to Bathurst^{a}	V set and Endeavour
Newcastle & Central Coast Line	Central and Newcastle	G, H and V set
South Coast Line	Central^{b} and Bomaderry or Port Kembla	T, G, H and V set
Southern Highlands Line	Campbelltown^{c} and Moss Vale, with limited services to Goulburn	Endeavour

^a Some peak services on the Blue Mountains Line ran to and from Hornsby
^b Some peak services and most weekend services on the South Coast Line ran to and from Bondi Junction
^c Some peak services on the Southern Highlands Line to/from Central. At other times, a change of train was required at Campbelltown or Macarthur

=== Regional line ===
Line colour and name	Between	Train Types
Hunter Line	Newcastle and Telarah, with limited services to Dungog or Scone	620/720 railcars and J set

=== Bus services ===
CityRail operated several bus routes along corridors where the railway line has been closed to passengers or as a supplement to rail services. These bus services appeared in CityRail timetables and accepted CityRail tickets, but were operated by private sector bus companies contracted by CityRail. Two were CountryLink services that carried CityRail passengers.

Colour	Connecting line	Between
	Blue Mountains Line	Lithgow to Bathurst via Mount Lambie^{(r)}
	Newcastle & Central Coast Line	Fassifern to Toronto via Blackalls Park
	South Coast Line	Wollongong to Moss Vale/Bundanoon via Robertson^{(r)}
	Southern Highlands Line	Moss Vale to Goulburn via Marulan
	Southern Highlands Line	Picton to Bowral via Thirlmere on weekdays only (replaces the closed Picton-Mittagong loop line)

^(r) CountryLink services, seat reservations required

=== NightRide ===
To provide a passenger service between midnight and 05:00 while leaving the tracks clear of trains for maintenance work, parallel bus services were established in 1989. NightRide services operated typically at hourly intervals (some routes depart more frequently on weekends). NightRide services were run by private bus operators, and identified by route numbers beginning with "N". All valid CityRail tickets for a destination (apart from single tickets) were accepted on NightRide services.

=== Network overview ===
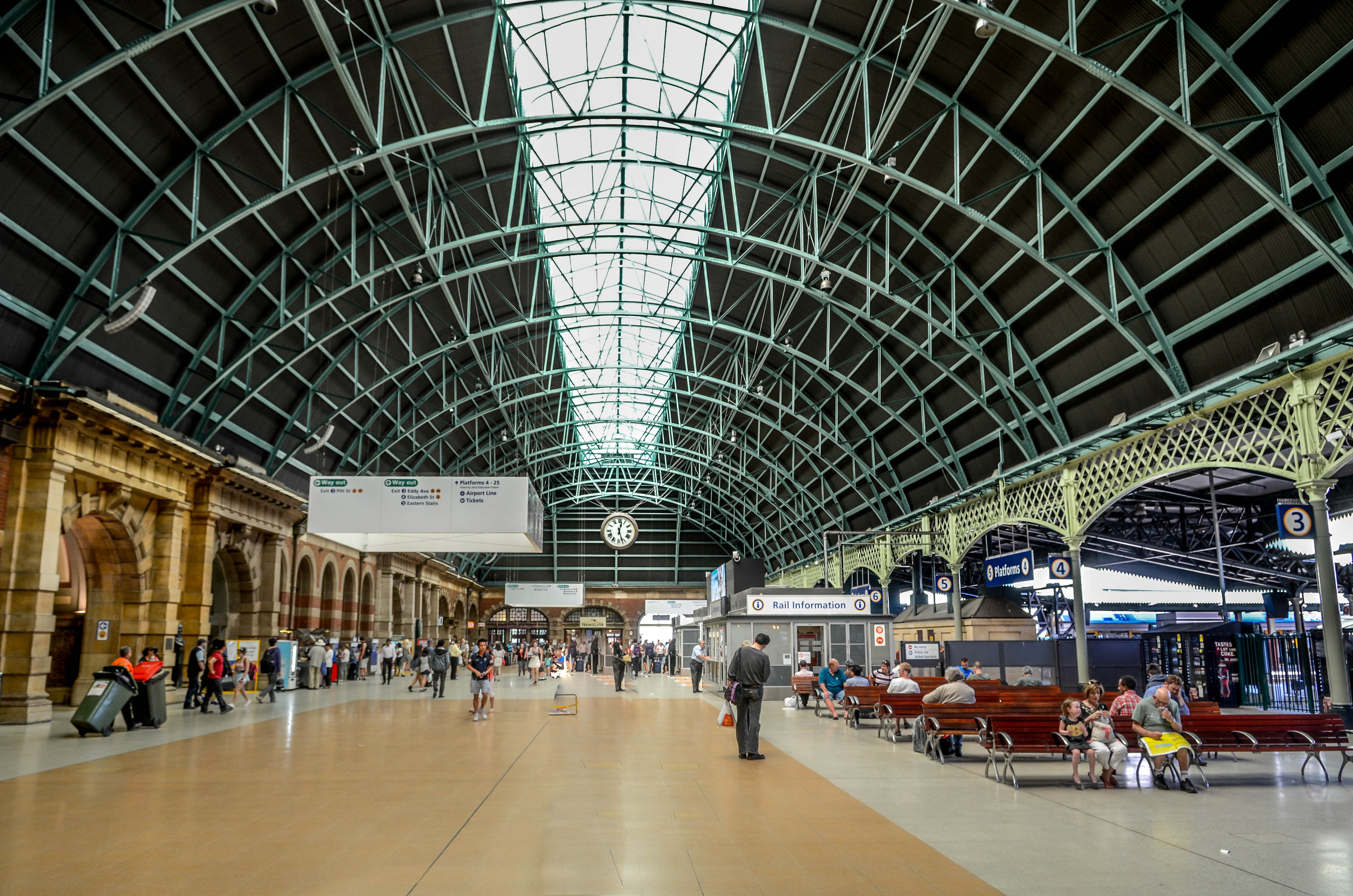
The concourse of Central Railway Station, the main station on the CityRail network that opened in its present location in 1906

Most Intercity trains terminated at Central while most suburban (except Carlingford Line) services proceeded through the city.

CityRail also operated several Intercity services that terminate at Central station (though some services operated in the metro-style portions of the system in the peak hours). These lines stretched over 200 kilometres from Sydney, as far north as Newcastle, as far west as Bathurst, as far south-west as Goulburn and as far south as Kiama and Port Kembla. Southern Highlands trains required a connection at Campbelltown as they ran into the city during peak hours only.

Regional services operated from the terminus station at Newcastle, with local electric services to the Central Coast and diesel services to Telarah with some extending to Dungog and Scone. Diesel services also operated on the South Coast Line between Kiama and Bomaderry.

The hub of the CityRail system was Central station, where most lines started and ended. Trains coming from the Airport & East Hills Line and Bankstown Line, after travelling anti-clockwise on the City Circle, sometimes terminated upon arrival at Central and proceeded to the Macdonaldtown turnback. However, most trains continued on and become outward bound Inner West Line and South Line services. The reverse applied for trains coming from the Inner West and South lines, which, if not terminating, became outward bound trains on the Airport & East Hills and Bankstown lines respectively. In the same manner, all trains from the Western Line and Northern Line became North Shore Line trains once they reached Central.

As well as the Intercity services mentioned above, local services also ran in the Newcastle local area during off-peak times, as part of the Newcastle & Central Coast Line. Local services also ran on the South Coast Line in the Wollongong local area, usually between Thirroul and Port Kembla.

=== Passenger information systems ===
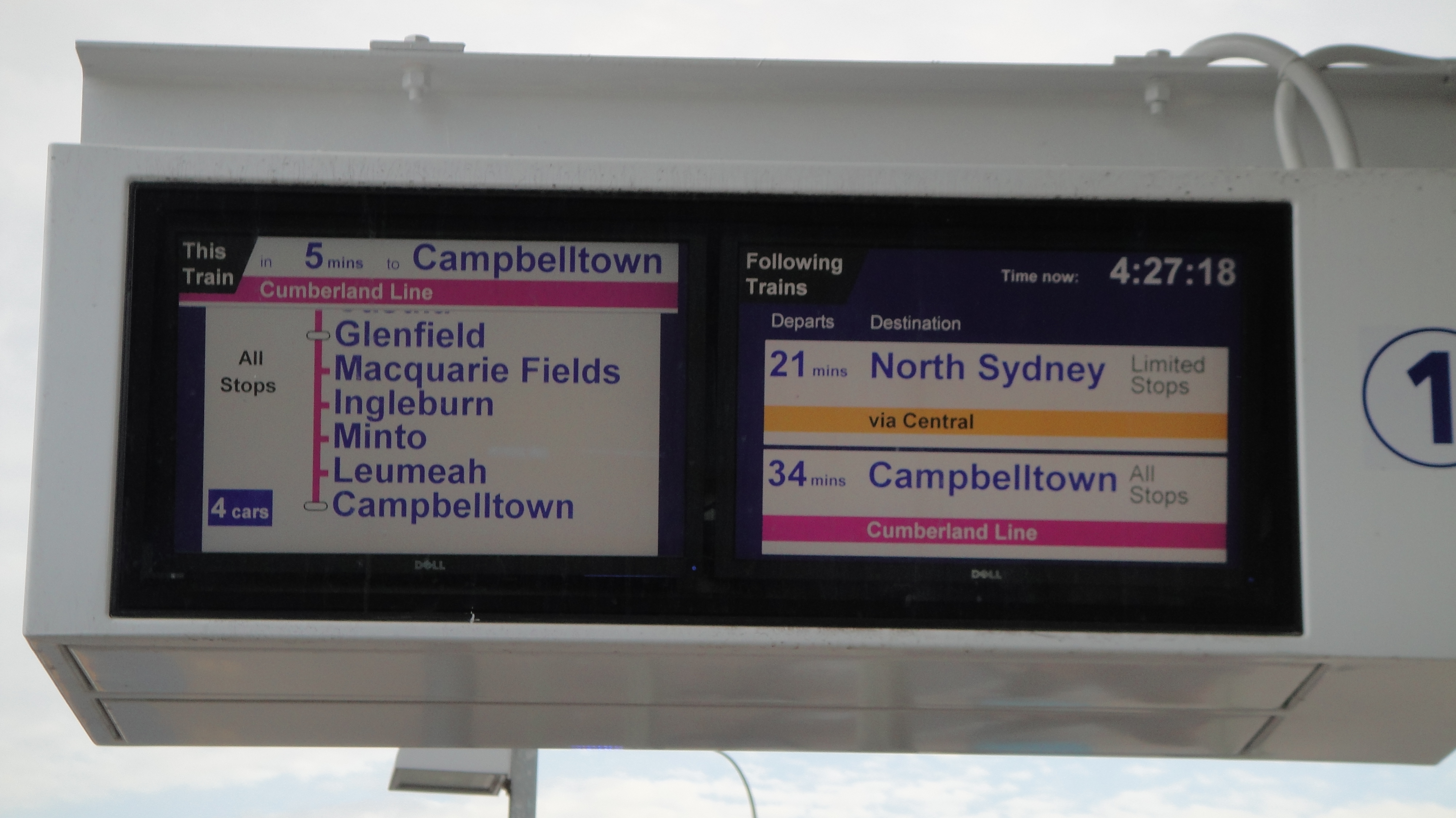
Dual horizontal, ceiling mounted screens as installed at many CityRail stations

Many CityRail stations were equipped with electronic passenger destination indicator boards. These provided information on the current time, next three available services, time due to arrival, destination route and the number of train carriages available.

CityRail Chime
The distinctive chime that is played prior to announcements

Due to the many differing types of stations that CityRail serves, their screens varied in form. In station where trains arrived at a higher frequency, 2 or more vertical LED screens were used on each platform to display the destination and arrival time whereas in low frequency areas 1 or 2 dual horizontal LED screens with a larger font were used. Manual destination indicator boards were still used at some lower patronage stations. In regional areas, a station relied on digital voice announcement for information on services. CBSM (Custom Built Sheet Metal) was responsible for the manufacture of many indicator board encasings.

== Challenges ==
The quality of the rail system was a matter of considerable political sensitivity. The performance of the State Rail Authority and RailCorp were questioned in regards to safety, training, a politically motivated focus on punctuality, management and workplace culture, with strong criticism from Justice Peter McInerny in his inquiries into the accidents at Glenbrook and Waterfall. Transport is the third largest area of public expenditure in NSW, after health and education. A newspaper distributed to commuters, mX, and The Sydney Morning Herald's "campaign for Sydney" kept transport at the top of the agenda ahead of the 2007 state election. In his 2003 interim report to the NSW Government, Tom Parry was highly critical of CityRail. "It is hard to believe that taxpayers or the state are getting the best possible value from the large amounts of money being spent each year," he wrote.

=== Safety ===
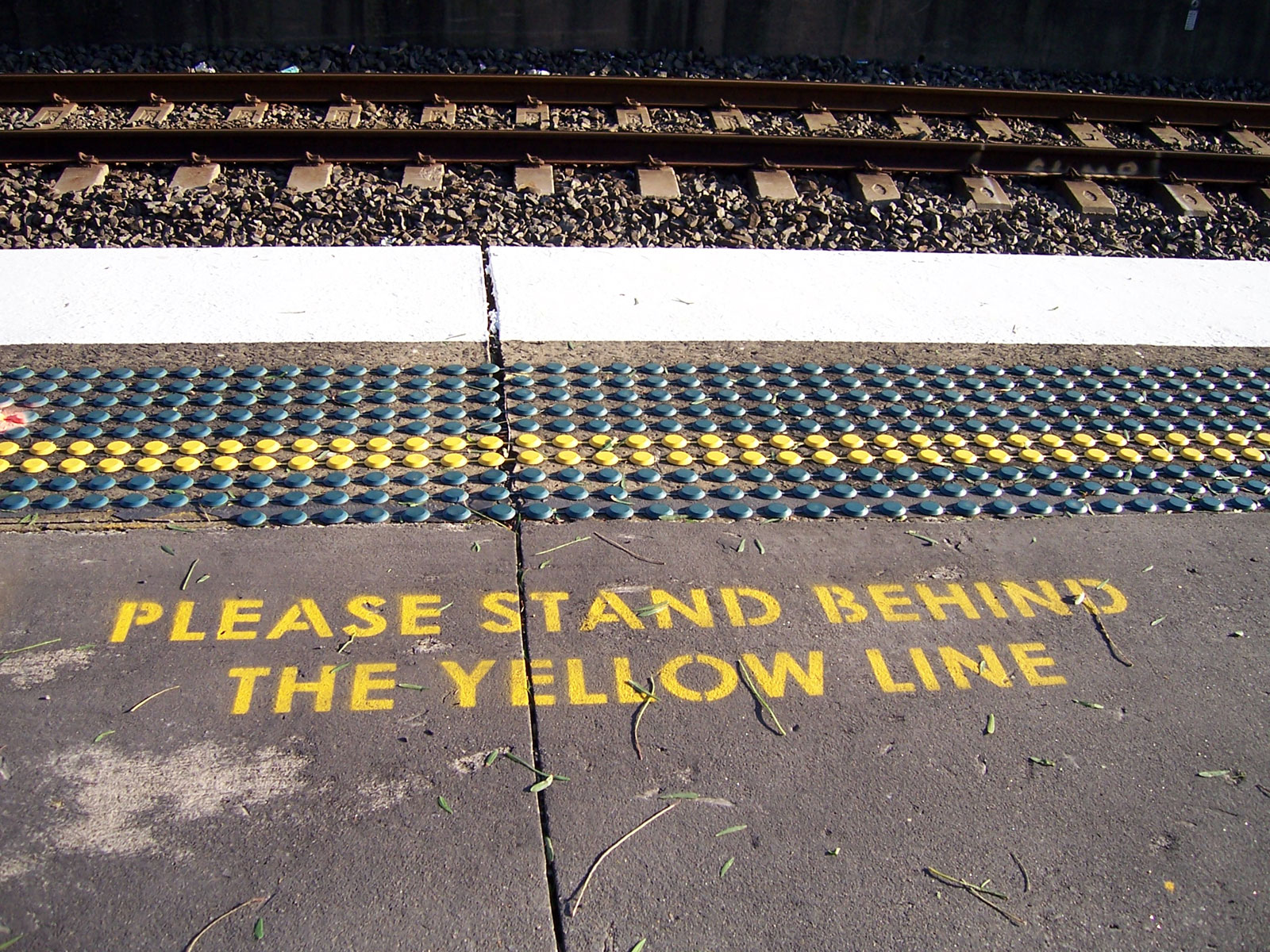
A typical message asking passengers to stand behind the yellow line, and tactile paving near the edge of the platform

The safety of the CityRail network was called into question by two fatal accidents. The second Glenbrook train disaster in 1999 killed seven people. In 2003, the Waterfall train disaster killed seven. Inquiries were conducted into both accidents. Official findings into the latter accident also blamed an "underdeveloped safety culture." There has been criticism of the way CityRail managed safety issues that arose, resulting in what the NSW Ministry of Transport called "a reactive approach to risk management".

CityRail has launched public information campaigns regarding railway trespassing, prams and strollers, and falling between the platform and the train.

=== Crime ===
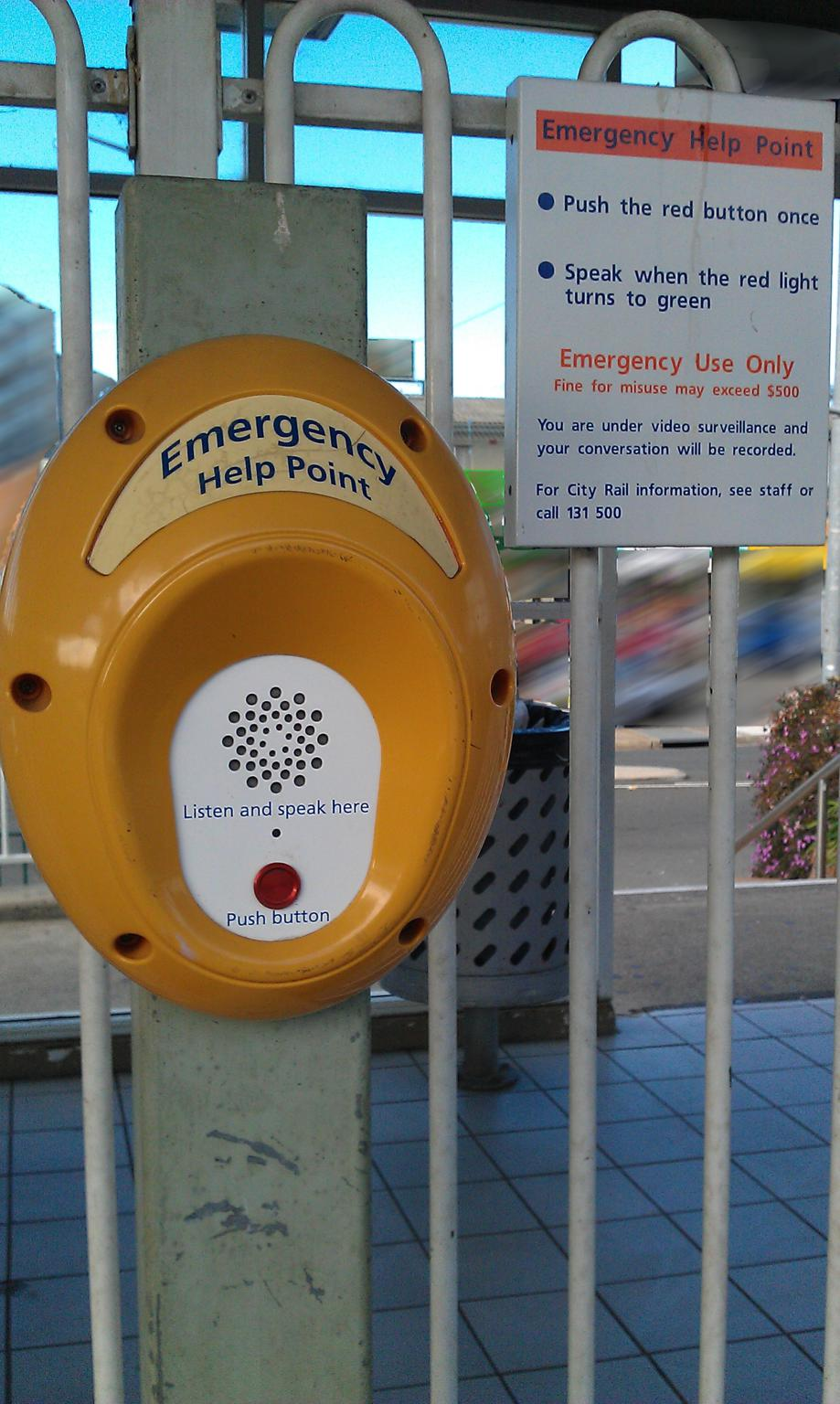
An emergency help point

Crime committed on railway property has decreased by 32.9% since 2002, which RailCorp attributes to the deployment of some 600 Transit Officers across the network. All stations, including those that are remote or unstaffed, have emergency "help points" to put passengers in immediate contact with authorities should an incident occur. All stations are covered by closed-circuit television surveillance. However, a large amount of graffiti is still evident on some trains and the depots.

In recent years, concerns over terrorism have played a role in the management of the network. CityRail and other public transport providers participate in an ongoing public terrorism awareness campaign, If you see something, say something, adapted from a similar campaign in New York.

=== Overloading ===
In 2008, overloading of trains was found by the Independent Pricing and Regulatory Tribunal (IPART) to be a significant cause of delays. A survey undertaken by RailCorp in September 2011 revealed that 6 of the 13 lines had a maximum load that exceeded 135% (of the seated capacity) during the peak morning commute.

=== Public perception ===
One result of CityRail's increasing problems was a sharp rise in public complaints and attacks against staff, with a Boston Consulting Group report claiming staff were actively hiding from irate customers wishing to complain about the service. The highly negative public perception of transit officers acting as ticket inspection officers and charging significant on-the-spot fines has also led to the organisation introducing anti-spitting fines and signage requesting commuters not abuse staff.

== See also ==
- Sydney Trains
- Railways in Sydney
- Transport in Sydney
