= New South Wales 620/720 class railcar =

Class of diesel-hydraulic multiple units

620/720 class railcars
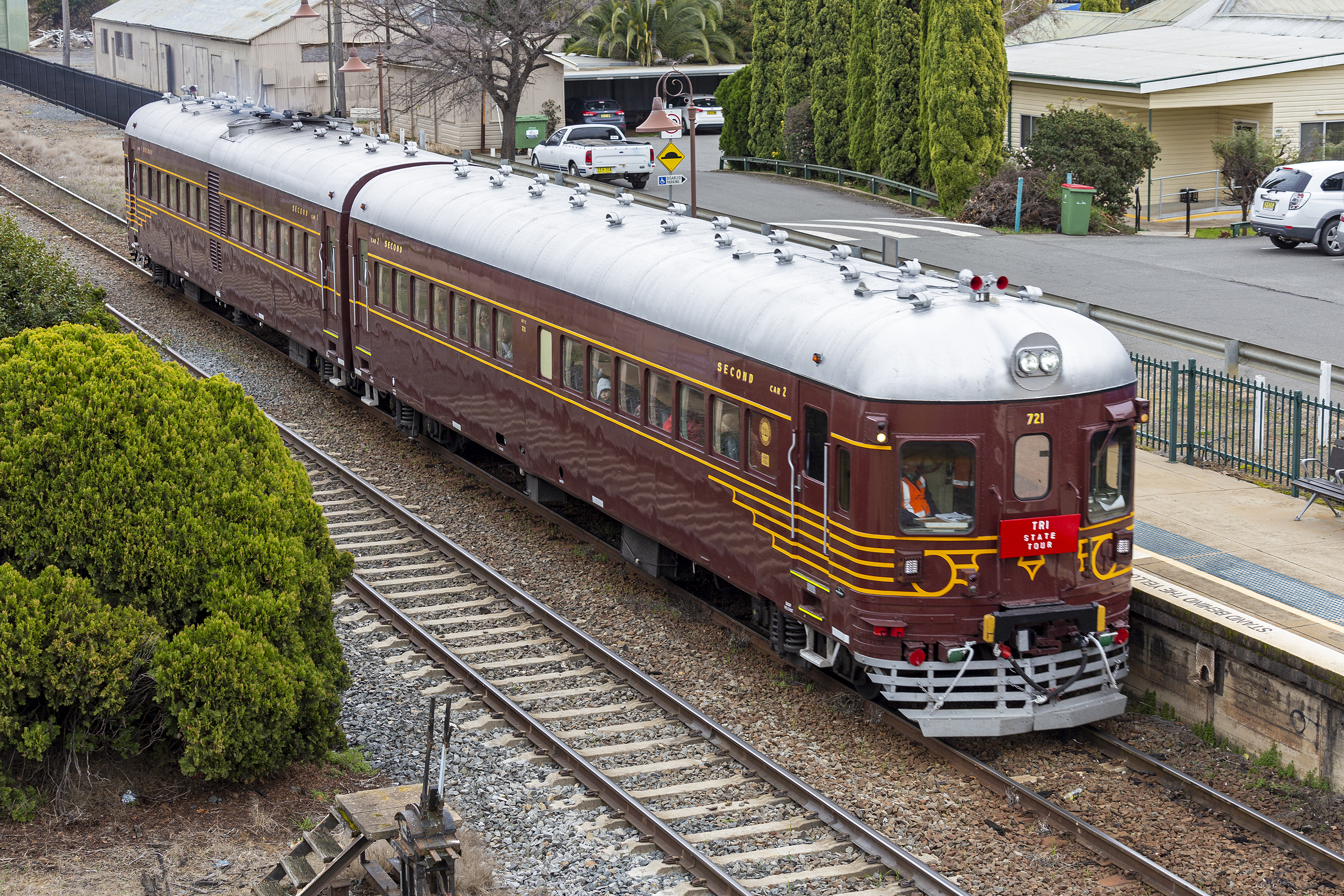
- Preserved NTC 721 and NPF 621 in original Indian Red livery at Wagga Wagga

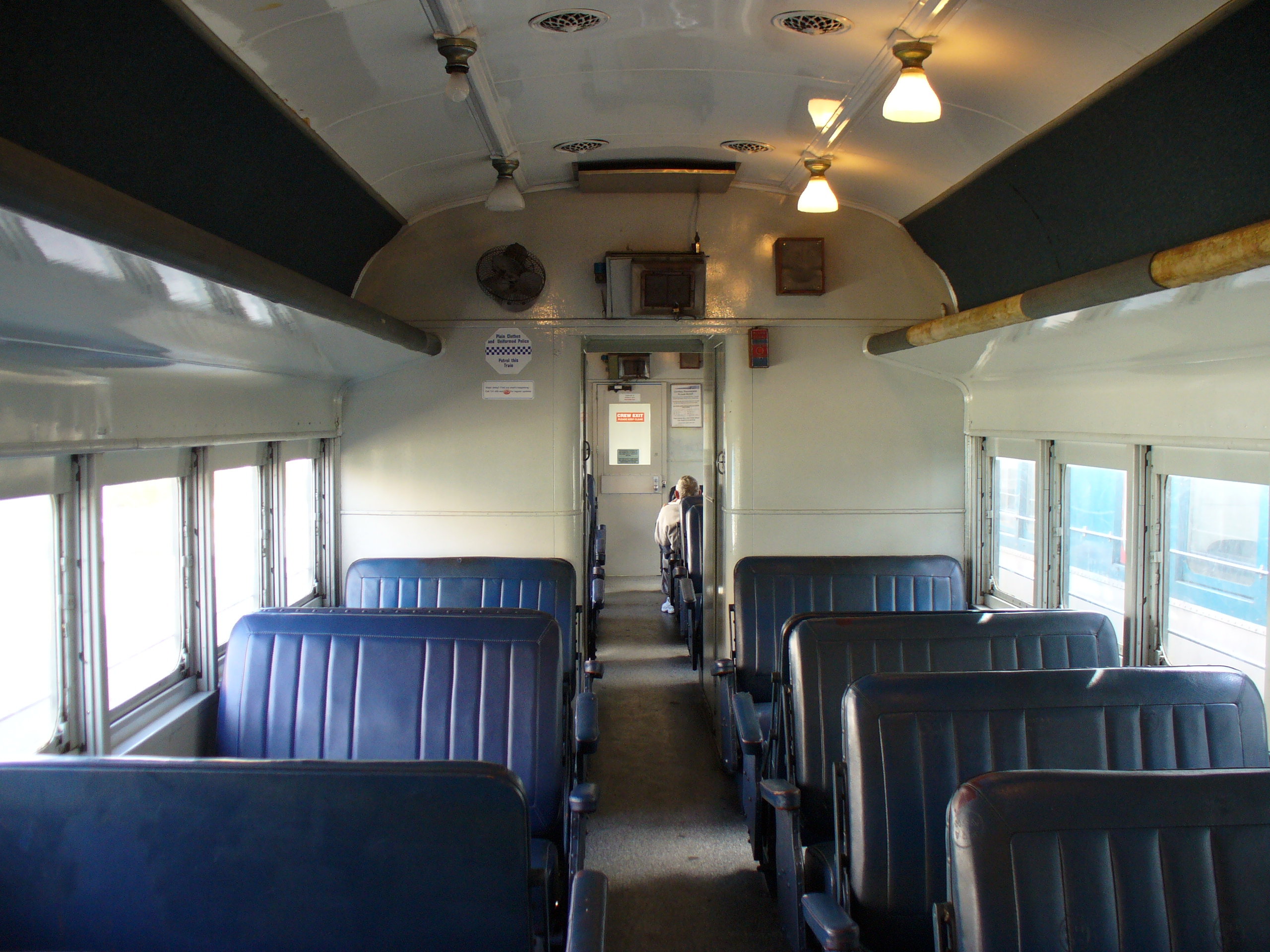
- Interior of a 620/720 carriage
- Stock type: Diesel-hydraulic multiple unit
- Manufacturer: New South Wales Government Railways
- Built at: Chullora Railway Workshops
- Constructed: 1961–1968
- Entered service: 1961–2007
- Number built: 36 vehicles (18 two-car units)
- Number in service: 1 (car 726)
- Number preserved: 21
- Successor: Endeavour Railcar, Hunter Railcar
- Formation: 1 power car, 1 driving trailer car
- Fleet numbers: 621/721–638/738
- Operators: Department of Railways (1961–1972); Public Transport Commission (1972–1980); State Rail Authority (1980–2003); CityRail (2003–2007)

Specifications
- Car body construction: Aluminium body on steel underframe
- Car length: 18.67 m (61 ft 3 in)
- Width: 2.97 m (9 ft 9 in)
- Maximum speed: 115 km/h (71 mph)
- Traction system: Diesel-hydraulic
- Prime movers: Rolls-Royce C8SFLH, 250 hp / GM Detroit Diesel 6/110, 250 bhp / Cummins NHHRTO-6-B1, 265 hp / Cummins NTA-855-R2, 300 hp / Cummins NTA-855-R4, 335 hp
- Power output: 500 hp (373 kW) (250 hp (186 kW) x 2); 530 hp (395 kW) (265 hp (198 kW) x 2); 600 hp (447 kW) (300 hp (224 kW) x 2); 670 hp (500 kW) (335 hp (250 kW) x 2)
- Transmission: Automatic lockup torque converter
- Power supply: 24 V DC
- Braking systems: S.E.M. electro-pneumatic straight air with emergency feature, handbrake
- Track gauge: 1,435 mm (4 ft 8 1/2 in) standard gauge

The 620/720 class railcars are a class of diesel-hydraulic multiple units (DHMU) built by the New South Wales Government Railways and operated from 1961 until 2007. Originally going in service under the Department of Railways, the railcars were built at Chullora Railway Workshops.

== Construction ==
The 620/720 class railcars were an evolution of the 600/700 railcars that had been built in 1949/50. Like their predecessors they were built with an aluminium body on a steel frame at the New South Wales Government Railways' Chullora Railway Workshops. However they were fitted with different engines, transmissions and electrical systems. Six received two 8-cylinder Rolls-Royce C8SFLH with Rolls-Royce DFR 11500 transmissions, 11 received two 6-cylinder GM Detroit Diesel 6/110 with Allison RC3 transmissions and one received two 6-cylinder Cummins NHHRTO-6-B1 engines with Twin Disc DFFR 10034 transmissions. Electrically, the class was compatible with the 900 Class DEB sets and both classes could work interoperably.

== History ==
The first five sets were ordered to operate suburban services out of Newcastle and were fitted with economy class seats throughout. The next six were constructed with both first and economy class accommodation to operate longer services out of Newcastle and between Liverpool and Campbelltown until the latter section was electrified in 1968. The remaining seven were constructed to operate regional services including :

- Sydney Central to Lithgow via Goulburn and Cowra
- Grafton to Casino
- Orange to Mudgee via Lithgow
- Dubbo based services
- Casino to Murwillumbah

From the mid-1970s, one was attached to the DEB set operating the Canberra Monaro Express during times of heavy demand. In late 1984, two were transferred to Wollongong from Lithgow joining three sets that had been there for many years. The balance of the fleet by this stage was all based in Newcastle.

== Withdrawals and Upgrades ==
During the life of the class, three cars were damaged in accidents and withdrawn. NPF 624 was burnt out at Gosford in 1981, NTC 734 was damaged in a collision with a motor vehicle on the Gwabegar line in 1981 and subsequently withdrawn in 1983, while NTC 728 was damaged in a collision with a coal train at Hexham in 2002 and was not repaired. NPF 634 was matched with trailer NTC 724 and they operated as a mismatched set until they were withdrawn.

MPF 638 was fitted with Japanese Niigata DBRG2115 transmissions as a trial in 1978 and proving reasonably successful Niigata transmissions were deployed in some of the 900 Class power cars. Ageing equipment plagued the Class in the 1970s and five units received 300 hp Cummins NTA-855-R2 engines and Twin Disc DFFR 10034 transmissions originally destined for upgrading the 600 Class power cars.

From the early 1980s, the remaining Rolls-Royce and GM powered units, along with Cummins powered NPF 638, were fitted with 335 hp Cummins NTA-855-R4 engines and Voith T211r transmissions. This drive train proved highly successful and was also deployed in the 900 Class power cars.

== First eleven withdrawn ==
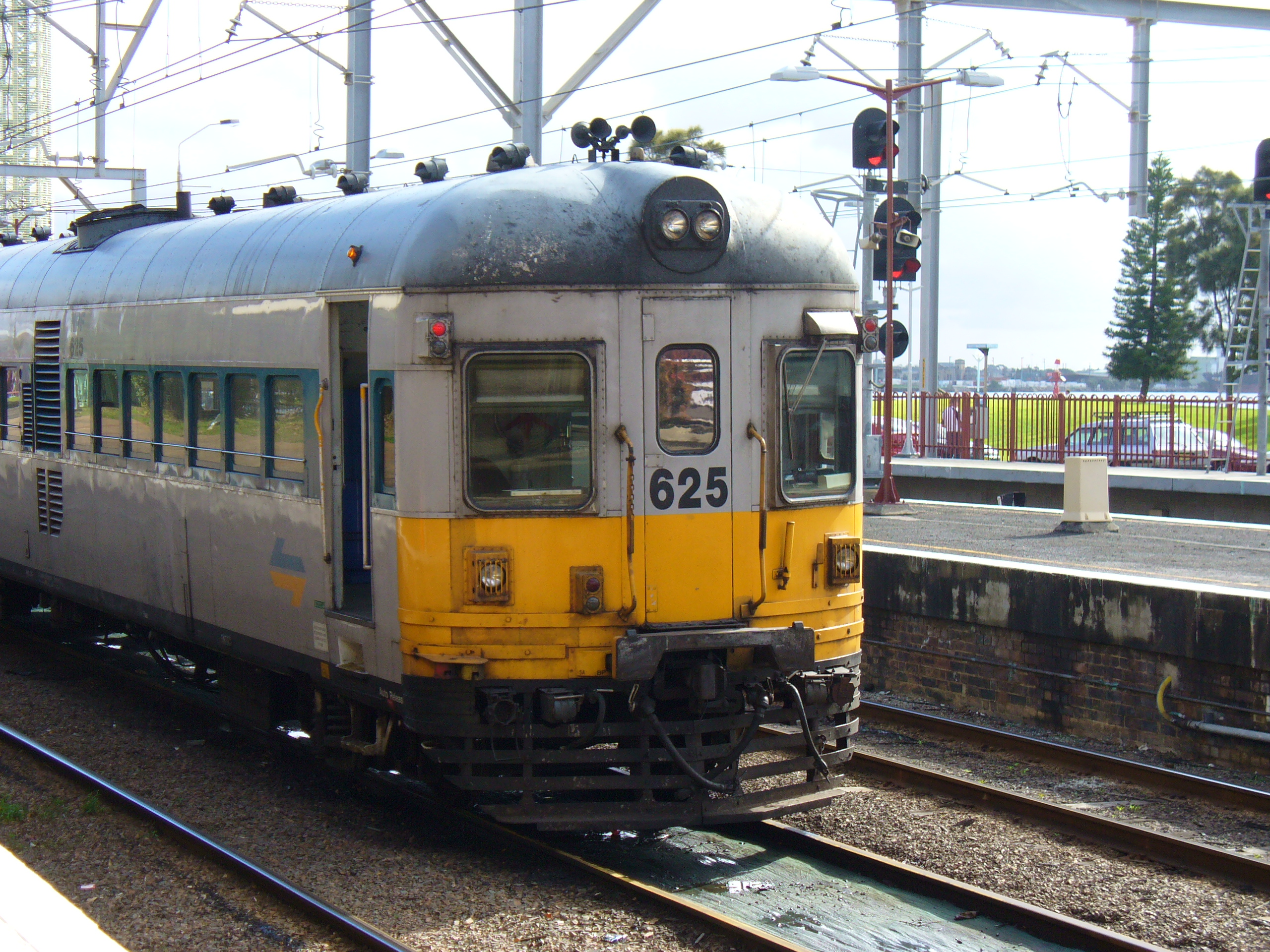
625/725 at Newcastle station in 2006

It was planned that all would be replaced by the 15 Endeavour railcars in 1994 but after it was decided to divert some of these units to Main South line services, seven were retained, all based in Newcastle. These were all overhauled by Rail Services Australia, Chullora in 1999 including a repaint into CityRail livery and fluorescent lights fitted. The seven sets remaining (621/721, 623/723, 625/725, 626/726, 628/728, 629/729 and 631/731) were based at the CityRail Endeavour Service Centre at Broadmeadow. These units, in conjunction with five Endeavour railcar sets provided services on the Hunter Valley network.

== Final seven withdrawn ==
Following the delivery of the Hunter railcars all seven were withdrawn in 2007, with a last service running on 29 October 2007, as a special service with invited guests, from Newcastle to The Rail Motor Society's Depot at Paterson and return.

== Preservation ==
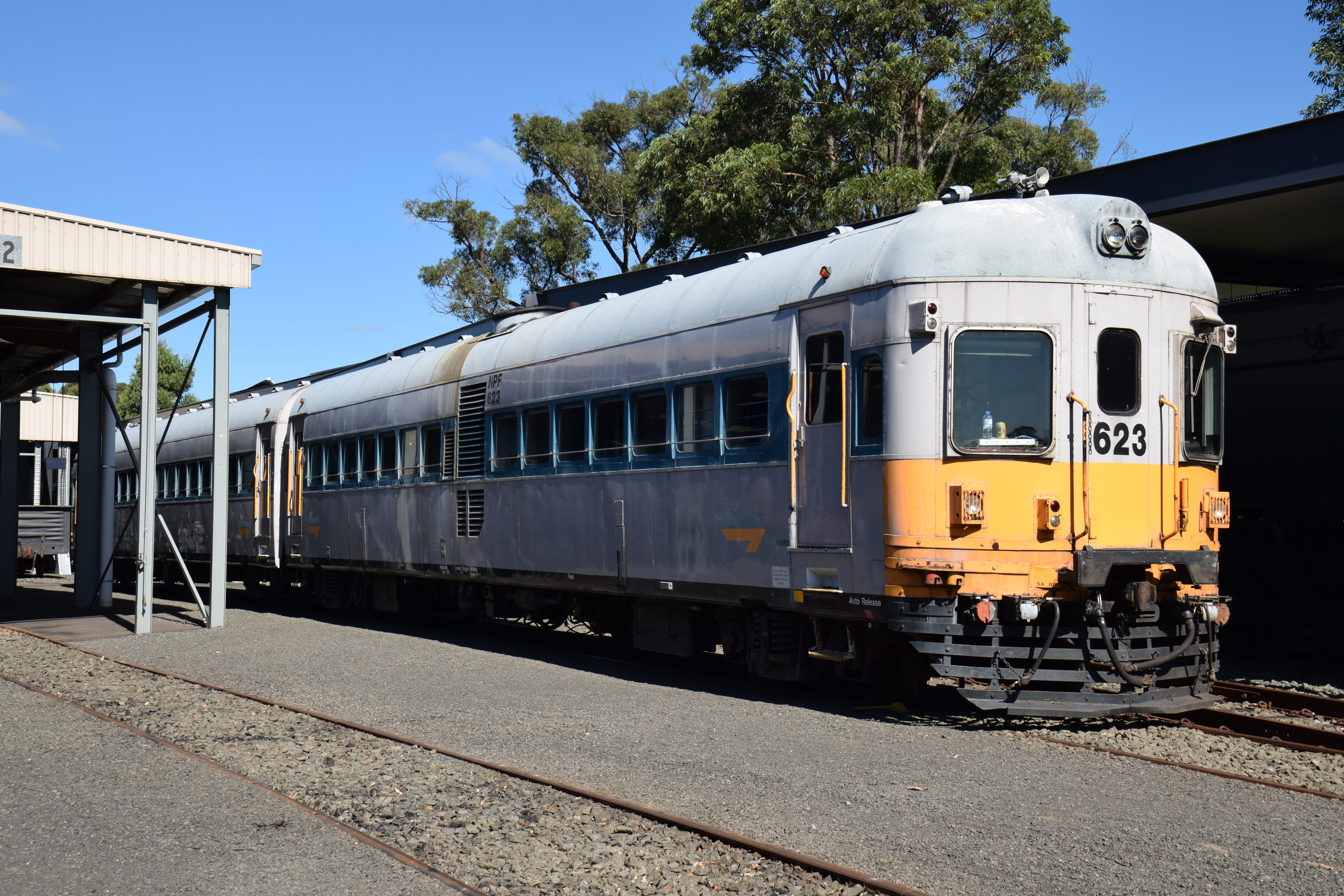
No. 623/723 in its final CityRail livery at the New South Wales Railway Museum, Thirlmere, 31 March 2016.

A few have been preserved:

- 621/721 has been designated a heritage item and placed in the care of the Rail Motor Society, Paterson and restored to operational condition in the Indian red colour scheme
- 622/727 preserved at Tenterfield station
- 623/723 has been designated a heritage item and placed in the care of the NSW Rail Museum, Thirlmere
- 625/725 Privately owned at the Canberra Railway Museum
- 626 Privately owned
- 726 by Lithgow State Mine Heritage Park & Railway (owned privately by a member; on long term hire to Byron Bay Train)
- 627/630 by Hills Transport, Tamworth
- 629/729 by The Rail Motor Society, Paterson
- 631/731 Privately owned, operational
- 632/732 by New England Railway, Armidale
- 633/733 by the Dorrigo Steam Railway & Museum
- 638/738 by the Lachlan Valley Railway, Cowra

RailCorp converted 631/731 to Mechanised Track Patrol Vehicle ML070 with 625/725 retained as a source of spares from 2009. Track patrols commenced using ML070 in early 2011. Cooma Monaro Railway secured ownership of both in January 2015 and they were stored in the Cooma railway yard precinct. They were sold in 2020 to a private owner in Canberra who restored them to operational status and are currently operated by Lachlan Valley Railway Society and have reverted to the original vehicle codes of NPF 631 and NTC 731.

The Lithgow State Mine Railway was lent 623/723 for restoration at Goulburn Railway Workshops, for eventual re-entering of service in Lithgow and the surrounding region. Following a breakdown in negotiations, 623/723 subsequently returned to Transport Heritage NSW at Thirlmere.
