= New South Wales 900/800 class railcar =

Type of train formerly used in Australia

DEB Railcar
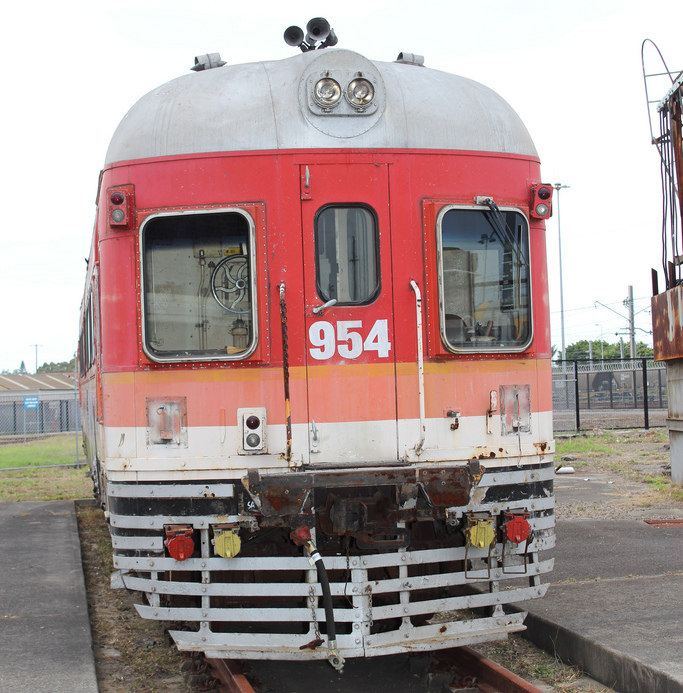
- HPF 954 in storage at Broadmeadow Locomotive Depot, 2012
- Stock type: Diesel Multiple Unit
- In service: 1951–1994
- Manufacturer: New South Wales Government Railways
- Built at: Chullora Railway Workshops
- Constructed: 1951–1960
- Number built: 18 power cars, 18 trailer cars
- Fleet numbers: 901–910, 951–959, 351–353, 751–753, 801–803, 851–857, 861–862

Specifications
- Car body construction: Aluminium (with steel underframe)
- Car length: 18.67 m (61 ft 3 in) power cars, 17.83 m (58 ft 6 in) trailer cars
- Width: 2,970 mm (9 ft 8 7/8 in)
- Height: 3,920 mm (12 ft 10 3/8 in)
- Maximum speed: 115 km/h (71 mph)
- Prime movers: Hercules DFXH-F / GM; Detroit Diesel 6/110 / Cummins NTA-855-R4
- Engine type: Diesels, 240 bhp, 250 bhp, 335 bhp
- Power output: 480 hp (360 kW) (240 hp or 180 kW x 2); 500 hp (370 kW) (250 hp or 190 kW x 2); 670 hp (500 kW) (335 hp or 250 kW x 2)
- Transmission: Lockup torque converter
- Braking systems: S.E.M. electro-pneumatic straight air with emergency feature, handbrake
- Track gauge: 1,435 mm (4 ft 8 1/2 in) standard gauge

The 900/800 class railcars (or DEB sets) is a type of diesel multiple units, built by the New South Wales Government Railways between November 1951 and November 1960, and which operated from 1951–1994.

== Configuration ==
As introduced, the DEB sets comprised four car, with a power car at either end of two trailer cars. The set consisted a driving power car with luggage compartment and second-class seating (HPF), a first-class sitting car (TB), a second class-sitting car with buffet (TFR) and a driving power car with second-class seating (PF). Later configurations included a three-car set with two power cars and a composite (first- and second-class) seating and buffet (TCR). Trains consisting of two four-car sets, or a four-car and a three-car set, were operated on a number of services, including the Canberra Monaro Express and the Northern Tablelands Express.

== History ==
The body shells of the DEB sets were very similar to the two-car 600/700 class railcars that had entered service in 1949. However, as they were intended for long distance services, they were air-conditioned.

=== A troubled beginning ===
The first four-car set entered service on the North Coast Daylight Express between Sydney and Grafton in November 1951, powered by four 240-horsepower (180 kW) horizontal in-line six cylinder, four stroke Hercules DFXH-F diesel engines (two per power car), coupled to Torcon hydraulic transmissions. The engines and hydraulic transmissions proved unreliable and the set was withdrawn in May 1952 after less than six months in service. The construction of further vehicles was suspended until a satisfactory solution could be found.

=== Rebirth ===
The solution involved the fitting of two 250-horsepower (190 kW) General Motors Detroit Diesel 6/110 inclined in-line six cylinder, two stroke diesel engines, coupled to Allison model TCLA 965 hydraulic transmissions on each power car. Production resumed and two four-car sets entered service in May 1955 on the Canberra Monaro Express to Cooma. Other sets were deployed on the Far West Express from Dubbo to Bourke, Cobar and Coonamble in December 1957 and the Northern Tablelands Express in June 1959. Later cars were fitted with Allison RC3 transmissions.

The DEB sets were able to provide flexible main line services with a seven or eight car train operating from Sydney to a major junction station and then dividing into two trains to travel through to their destinations. The Canberra Monaro Express (8 cars) divided at Queanbeyan with separate portions for Canberra and Cooma while the Northern Tablelands Express (seven cars) divided at Werris Creek with one portion operating to either Glen Innes or Tenterfield and the other to Moree, and Walgett once a week for a short period.

=== Service changes ===
The Canberra Monaro Express was reduced to a single four-car set in July 1973 following a fall in patronage. The repeated failures of the Tulloch railcars working the Riverina Express resulted in the now spare Canberra DEB set being assigned to Riverina workings in August 1973, allowing one Tulloch set to be withdrawn with a second set replacing the remaining Tulloch set following the cessation of the Far West Express in September 1975.

During the 1980s, a program of retrofitting higher performance Cummins NTA-855-R4 engines with Japanese Niigata DAFRG 2001 lock-up torque converter transmissions to all units commenced. Part way through the rebuilding program, use of the Niigata transmission was dropped in favour of the Voith T211r model.

=== Redeployed ===
DEB sets were replaced by XPTs on the Riverina Express in June 1982 and the Northern Tablelands Express in June 1984. One set was transferred to operate on a Canberra service in August 1982 before that too went over to XPT operation (not the Canberra Monaro Express) in August 1983, with the set transferred to operate Illawarra line services from Sydney to Bomaderry from November 1983. DEB sets were also used to operate connecting services from Junee to Griffith and Werris Creek to Moree.

Budd railcars took over the Griffith service in February 1983. The Moree service was replaced by road transport in February 1986, but a DEB service was reinstated in November 1988, before again being withdrawn in February 1990.

In late 1984, a DEB set took over the operation of the Orange – Lithgow – Mudgee service from a 620/720 set until replaced by road transport in December 1985.

The Canberra Monaro Express to Cooma ceased operating in September 1988 due to the government not restoring the Chakola bridge over the Numeralla River north of Cooma.

=== CityRail ===
From April 1989 all were reallocated to CityRail to operate South Coast services to Bomaderry and Main Southern line services to Moss Vale and Goulburn.

=== Demise ===
The last were retired in February 1995 after being replaced by Endeavour railcars.

Several were saved for preservation. One set is under restoration by Lachlan Valley Railway, based in Cowra. Five DEB set carriages have been designated heritage items and remain in the ownership of Transport Asset Holding Entity and are currently in storage at Broadmeadow Locomotive Depot.

== Status table ==
Number	Code	Entered service	Withdrawn	Status
901	PF	Nov 1951	24 Nov 1994	Preserved LVR, Cowra
902	PF	May 1955	22 Aug 1994	Damaged by fire in 1995 and scrapped
903	PF	May 1955	24 Nov 1994	Preserved LVR, Rothbury
904	PF	Sep 1957	29 Apr 1994	Scrapped 04/2015
905	PF	Sep 1957	22 Dec 1994	Preserved Dorrigo Steam Railway & Museum
906	PF	Jun 1959	Mar 1978	Rebuilt as HPF 959 1982–1984
907	PF	Apr 1959	16 Nov 1994	Preserved LVR, Cowra
908	PF	Nov 1959	30 Jan 1986	Destroyed by fire in 1986 & scrapped
909	PF	Nov 1960	9 Aug 1994	Preserved LVR, Cowra
910	PF	Nov 1960	23 Jan 1995	Preserved Transport Heritage NSW Chullora Heritage Hub
951	HPF	Nov 1951	20 Feb 1995	Scrapped
952	HPF	May 1955	23 Jan 1995	Privately Owned, The Station Hunter Valley
953	HPF	Jun 1955	24 Nov 1994	Preserved LVR, Cowra
954	HPF	Apr 1959	20 Feb 1995	Privately Owned, The Station Hunter Valley
955	HPF	July 1959	16 Nov 1994	Preserved Dorrigo Steam Railway & Museum
956	HPF	Oct 1959	9 Aug 1989	Scrapped
957	HPF	Nov 1960	24 Nov 1994	Preserved LVR, Rothbury
958	HPF	Nov 1960	23 Jan 1995	Preserved LVR, Rothbury
959	HPF	rebuilt from PF 906 1984	24 Nov 1994	Preserved Lachlan Valley Railway, Cowra
801	TB	Nov 1951	16 Nov 1994	Scrapped
802	TB	May 1955	22 Aug 1994	Scrapped
803	TB	Apr 1956	24 Nov 1994	Preserved LVR, Rothbury
751	TC	Sep 1957	24 Nov 1994	Preserved LVR, Rothbury
752	TC	Sep 1957	24 Nov 1994	Preserved Dorrigo Steam Railway & Museum
753	TC	Nov 1960	22 Dec 1994	Privately Owned, The Station Hunter Valley
851	TFR	Nov 1951	16 Nov 1994	Preserved Walcha Road
852	TBR	May 1955	converted to TFR 852 Dec 1956	
852	TFR	converted from TBR 852 Dec 1956	24 Nov 1994	Preserved Lachlan Valley Railway, Cowra
853	TBR	Mar 1956	converted to TM 853 Jul 1990	
853	TM	converted from TBR 853 Jul 1990	?	Preserved LVR, Cowra
854	TBR	Sep 1957	24 Nov 1994	Preserved Dorrigo Steam Railway & Museum
855	TBR	Jun 1959	24 Nov 1994	Preserved LVR, Rothbury
856	TBR	Nov 1960	23 Jan 1995	Preserved Transport Heritage NSW Chullora Heritage Hub
857	TBR	Jun 1959	converted to TM 857 Sep 1990	
857	TM	converted from TBR Sep 1990	23 Jan 1995	Preserved Lachlan Valley Railway, Cowra
861	TCR	Jul 1959	23 Jan 1995	Preserved LVR, Cowra
862	TCR	Nov 1960	24 Nov 1994	Preserved LVR, Cowra
351	TP	Nov 1957	Feb 1974	Scrapped
352	TP	Dec 1957	Feb 1974	Scrapped
353	TP	Jun 1958	Jun 1958	Scrapped

== Configuration ==
The diesel engines were direct coupled to a torque converter, the output from the torque converter was then transferred to a Spicer model 8 final drive unit mounted on the inner axle of each bogie via a propeller shaft. The bogies were of cast steel construction & were constructed by AE Goodwin. Coil spring suspension was fitted to both the axleboxes & bolster and the axles were fitted with roller bearings. Each engine also drove 24 Volt DC & 120 Volt DC generators, as well as an air compressor for the air brakes. Engine cooling was by two vertically mounted radiators contained in the body in a small compartment separating the two main passenger compartments. The air was drawn in through louvres in the walls and exhausted through the roof by thermostatically controlled fans.

Each power car was fitted with a driver's compartment to enable the train to be controlled from either end. The driving controls were electric; brake controls were electro-pneumatic and enabled coupled multiple units to be controlled by one driver. A safety device in the form of a dead man's foot pedal was also fitted in the driver's cabin. A guard's compartment was located adjacent to the driver's compartment in the end of the power cars.

The underframe construction consisted of two steel, all-welded Pratt trusses, extending from bolster to bolster and in depth from waist rail to below floor level constitute the main strength members of the cars. A light gauge aluminium framework made of pressings, in a similar manner to aircraft construction, was built on to the truss, the whole being then sheathed with aluminium. The floors were made up of 16 gauge aluminium alloy sheet covering the whole of the underframe upon which timber floor bearers were bolted to support the 13/16 inch (20.64 mm) plywood flooring. Linoleum was laid over the plywood. The floor under the plywood, body sides, and the roof were insulated with kapok. Longitudinal luggage racks extending the full length of the saloons were built into the body sides. These were fabricated from aluminium alloy. Interior partitions and doors were of 13/16" resin-bonded plywood. All side windows were double glazed, set in rubber channels, and fitted with silica gel crystals in containers to prevent frosting of the windows.

All the passenger seats were originally similar to the ones installed in the locomotive hauled air-conditioned daylight expresses of the same era; the first-class seats could be rotated and reclined; the second-class seats were of the turn-over type. Originally smoking and non-smoking accommodation was available in both classes. With the banning of smoking in enclosed places the cars then become all non-smoking.

The cars followed the modern trend and were air-conditioned for passenger comfort. The condenser and conditioner units being located above the ceiling at the end of each car. The conditioned air was conveyed along ducts in the car ceilings and delivered through anemostats to the passenger saloons. The air conditioning compressor units were mounted on the underframe of the trailer cars and in the control cabinets situated in the non-driving end vestibule of the power cars.

The power cars had two different configurations, the 900 Class (PF 901–910) having full passenger seating with a capacity of 39 Second Class passengers, while the 950 Class (HPF 951–958) had a luggage compartment at one end with a capacity of 5 tons, the other end compartment had a seating capacity of 24 Second Class passengers. PF 906 was rebuilt as HPF 959 between 1982 and 1984.

The trailer cars had a number of different seating configurations, depending upon which of the services they were deployed. There were three First Class passenger cars (TB 801–803), three Second Class sitting cars with buffet with a seating capacity of 38 passengers (TFR 851–853), four First Class sitting cars with buffet with a seating capacity of 38 passengers (TBR 854–857), two composite sitting cars with buffet (TCR 861–862) and three composite sitting cars with a capacity of 24 First Class and 31 Second Class passengers (TC 751–753).

There were also three parcel trailers built with dual braking systems to enable them to work with normal Westinghouse braked passenger stock and with the rail car fleet. These were coded TP 351–353 and worked through from Sydney on the Western Mail to connect with the Far West Express at Dubbo and obviated the necessity of transhipping luggage and parcels between the mail and the rail car service. Power for lighting and air-conditioning was provided to the trailer from the adjoining power car.

== Gallery ==
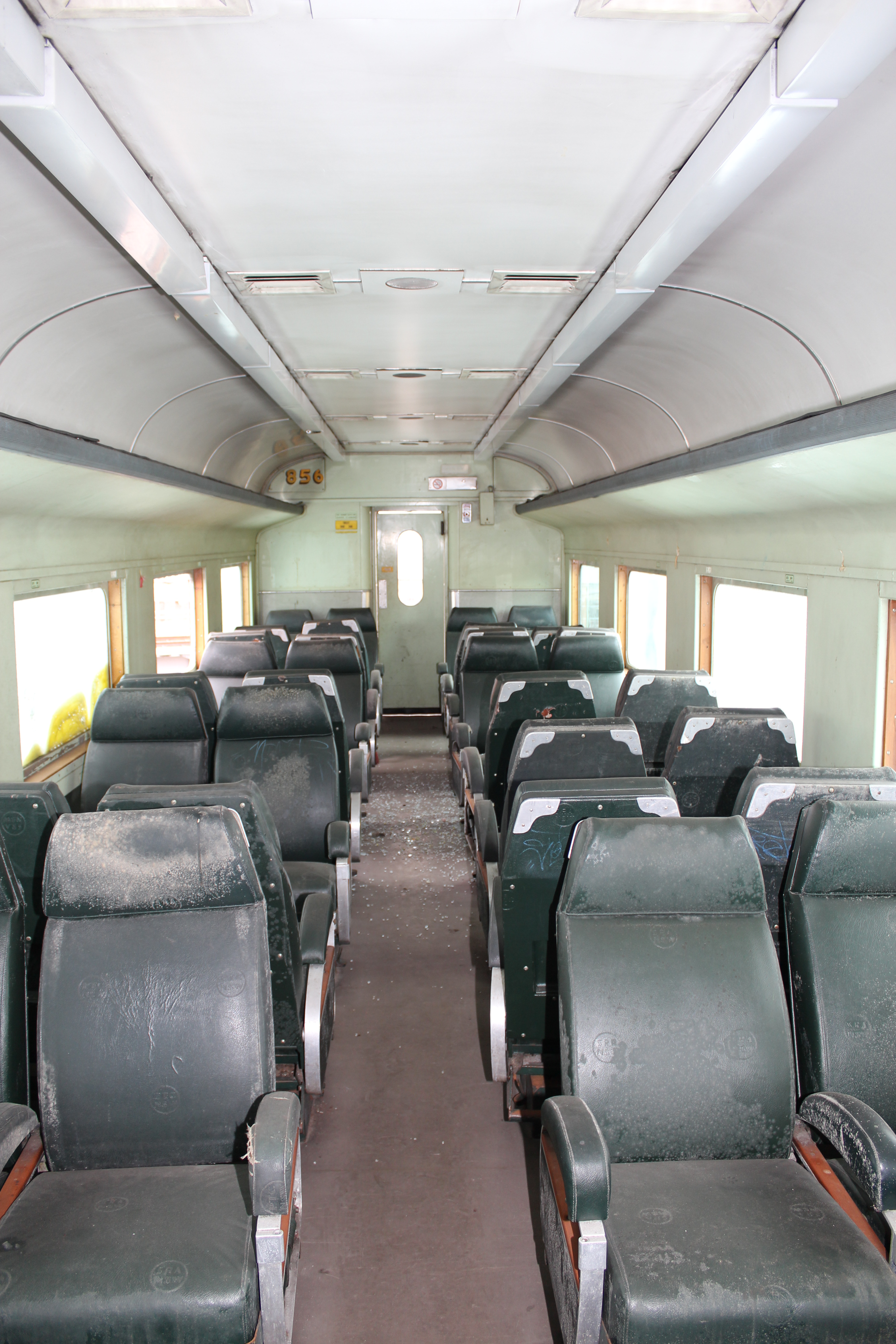
Interior of 1st Class Passenger section of Buffet Car TBR 856

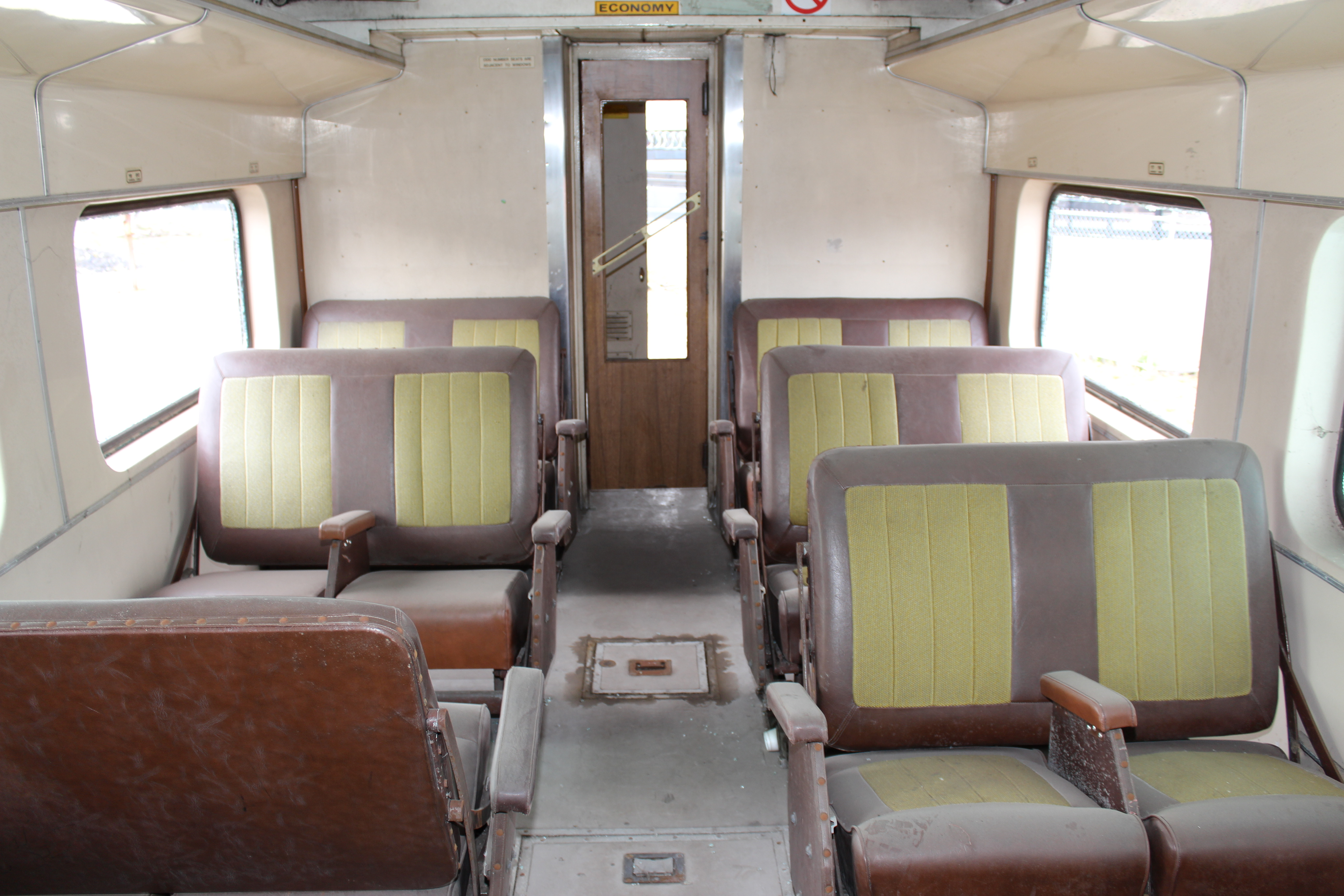
Interior of the 2nd Class Passenger section of Power Car HPF 952

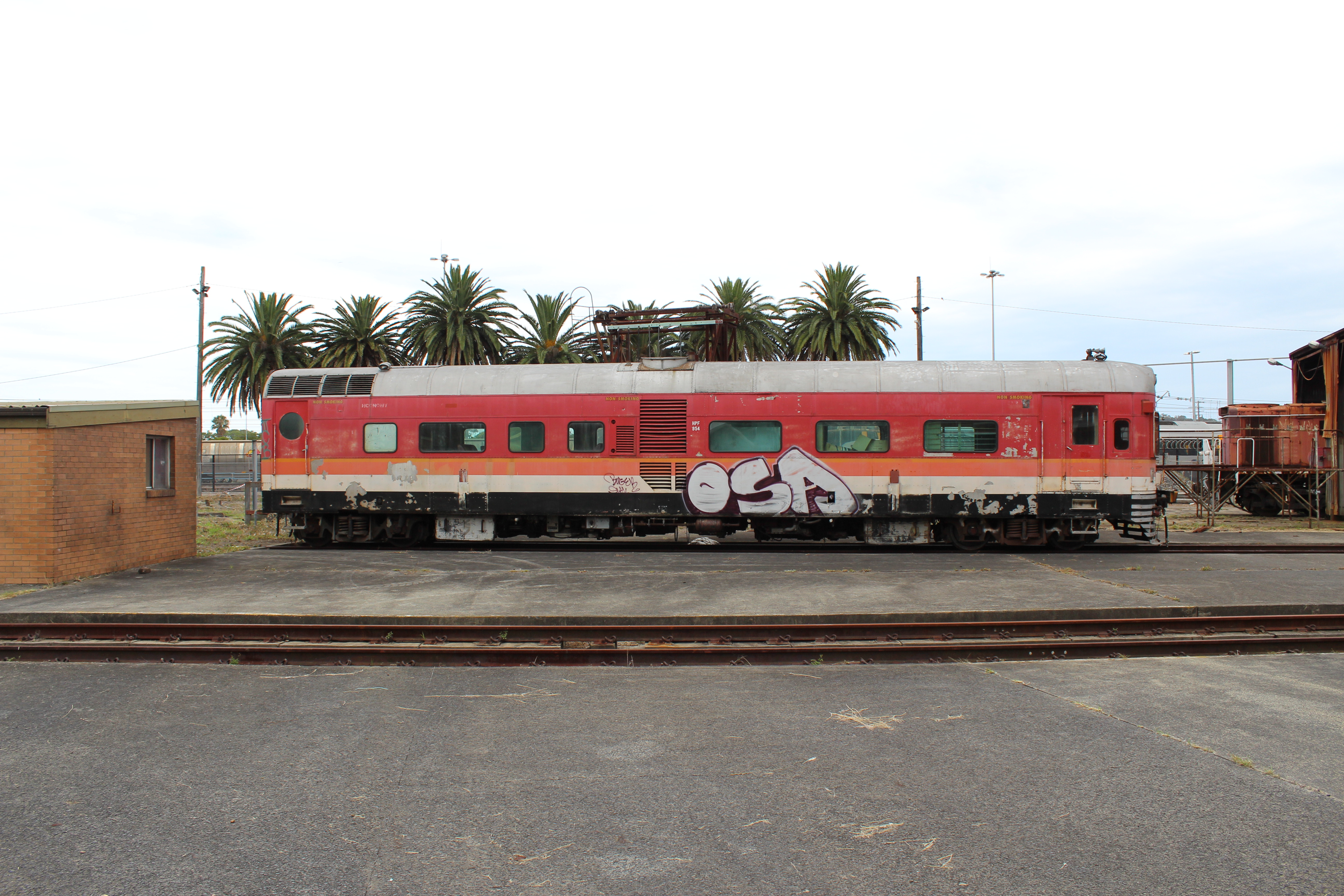
Exterior view of 2nd Class Power Car HPF 954

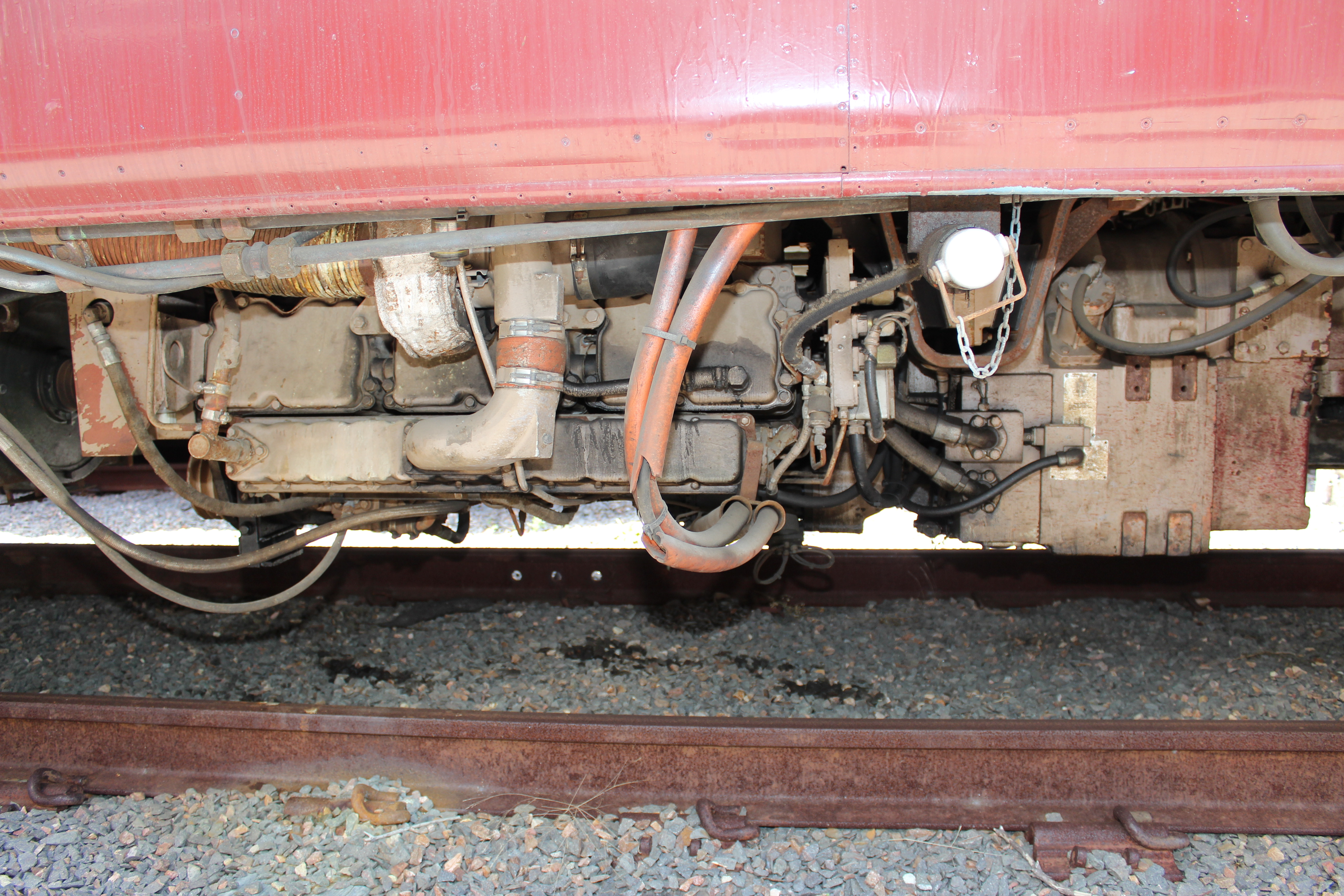
One of the Cummins engines & Voith Transmissions on Power Car PF 910

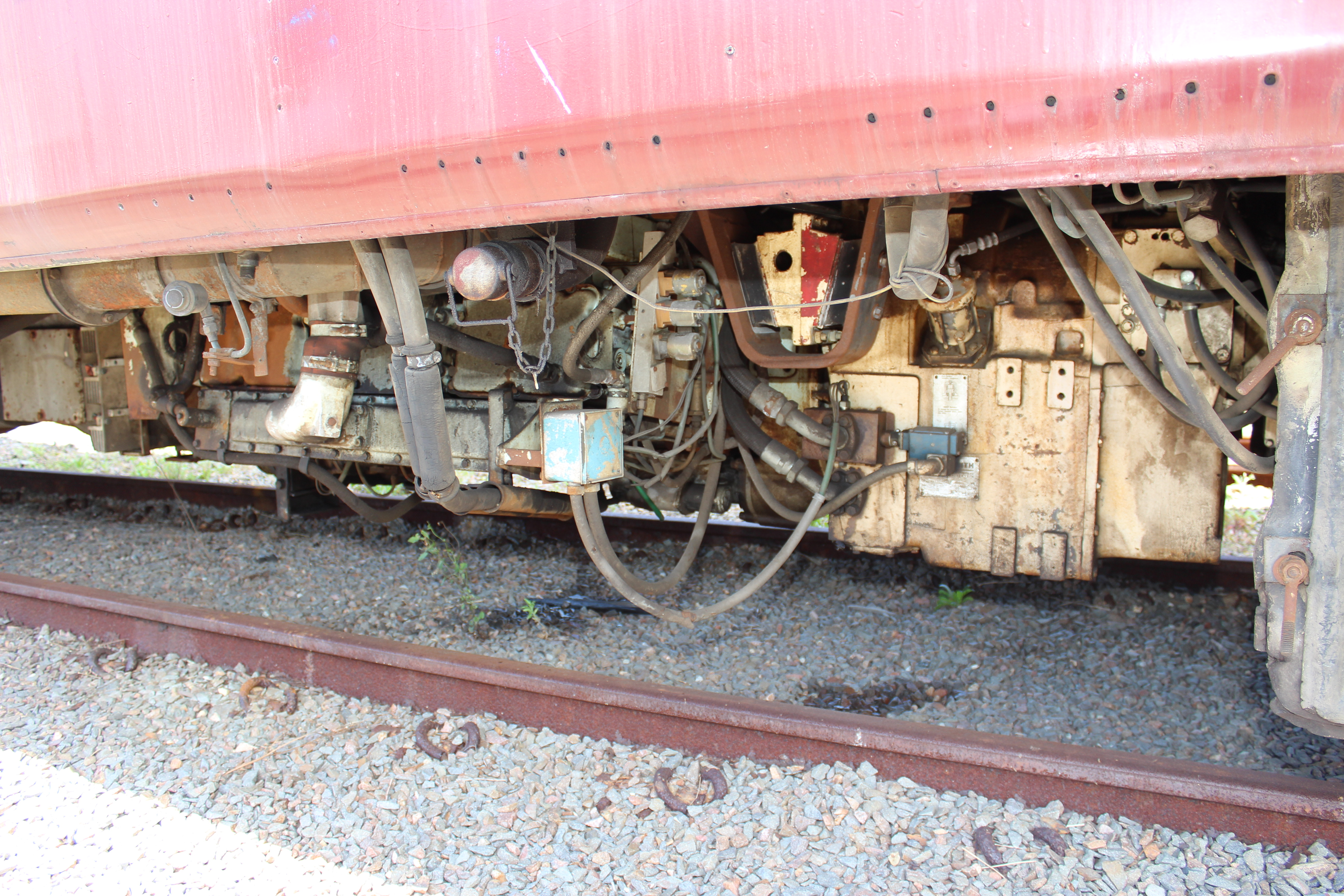
One of the Cummins engines & Voith Transmissions on Power Car PF 952

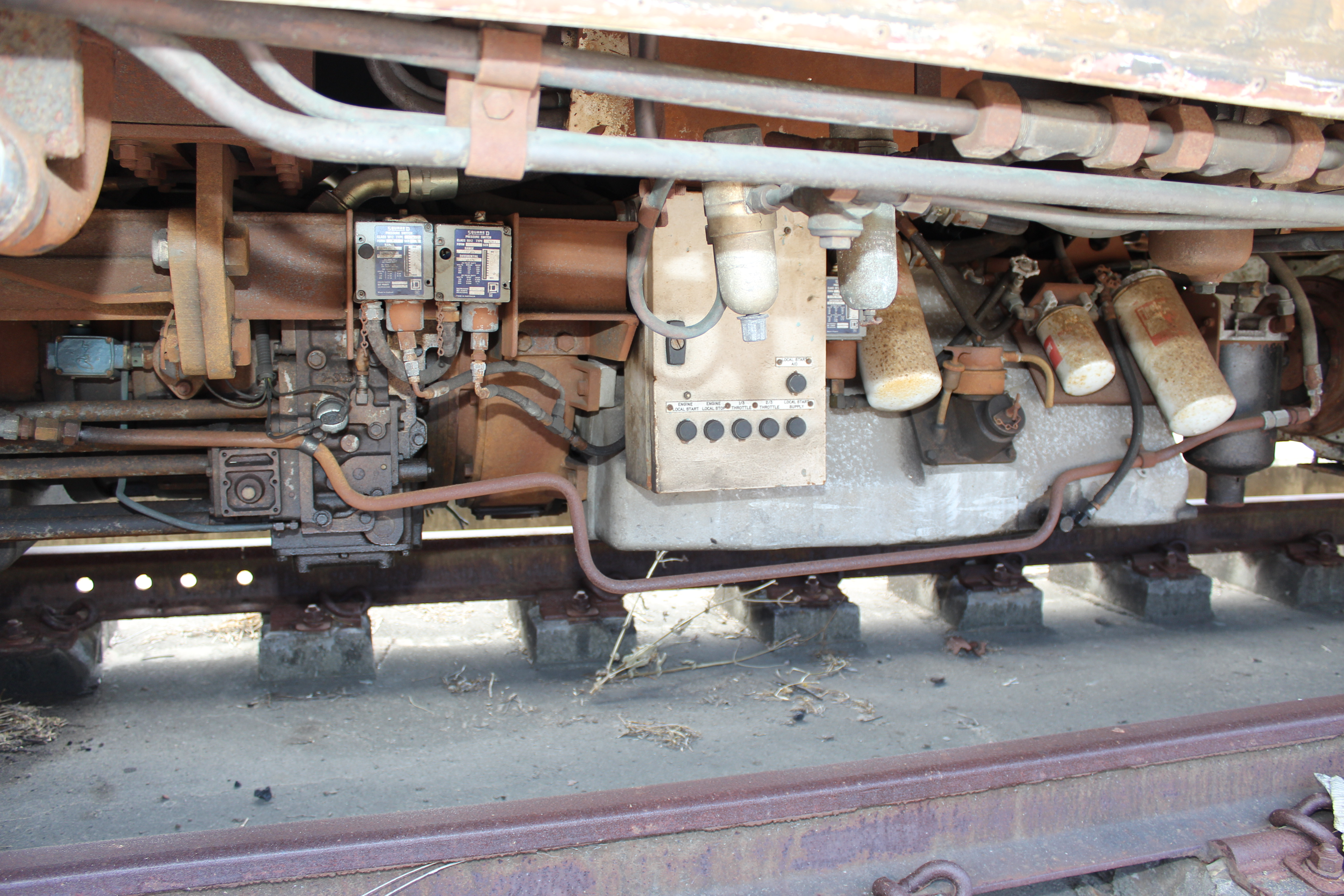
One of the Cummins engines & Niigata Transmissions on Power Car PF 954

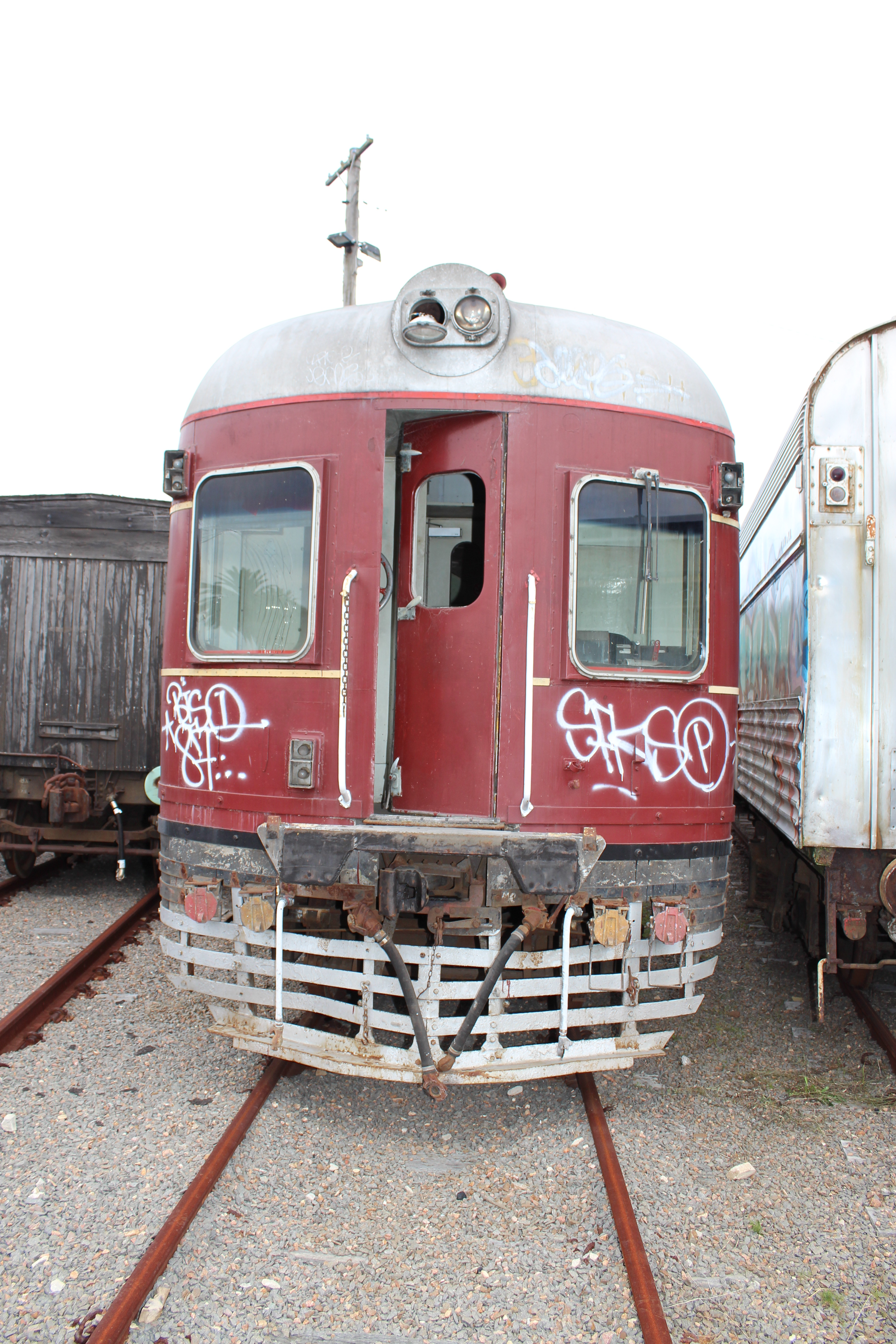
End view of power car PF 910 in storage at Broadmeadow Locomotive Depot

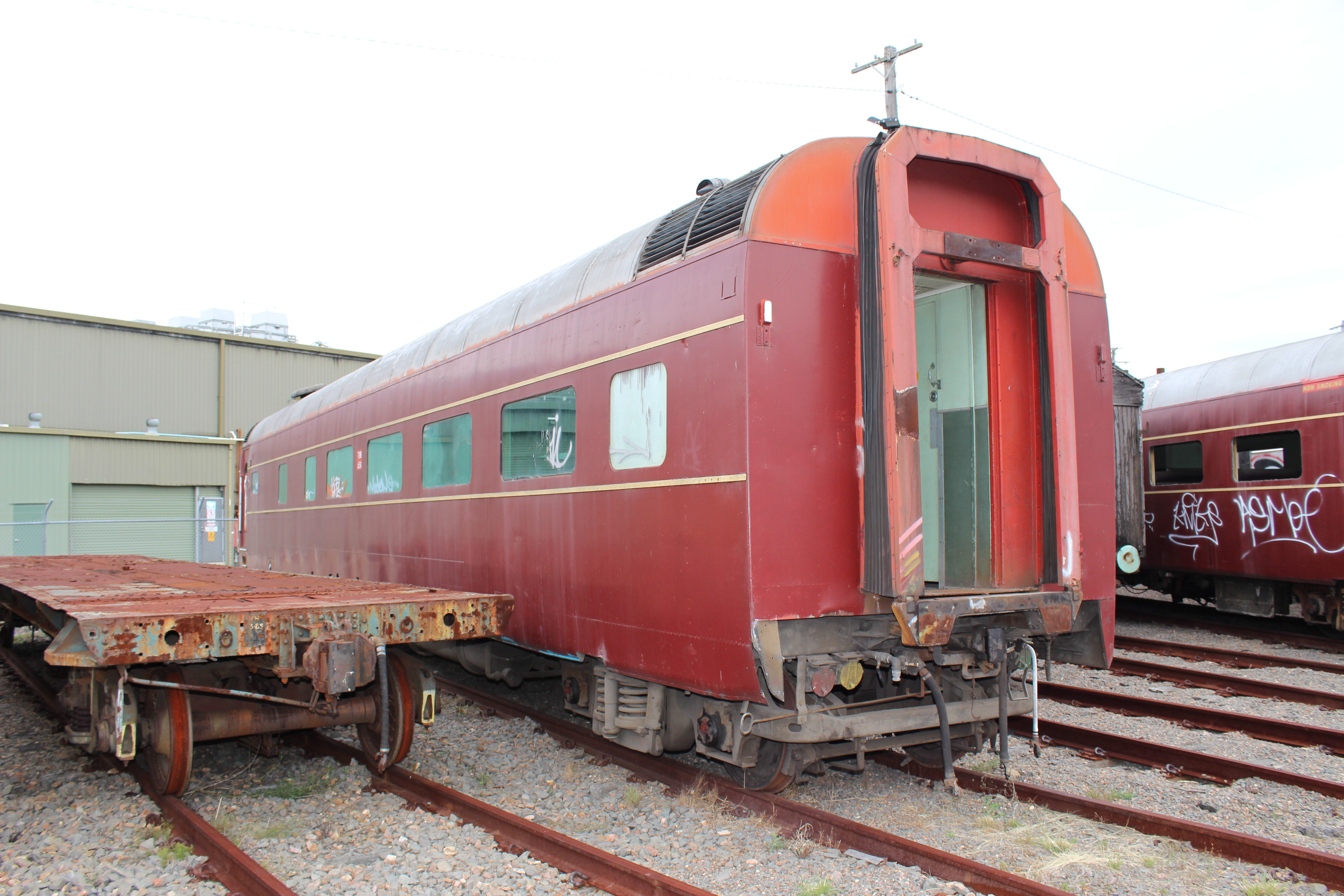
First Class Buffet Trailer Car TBR 856 in storage at Broadmeadow Locomotive Depot

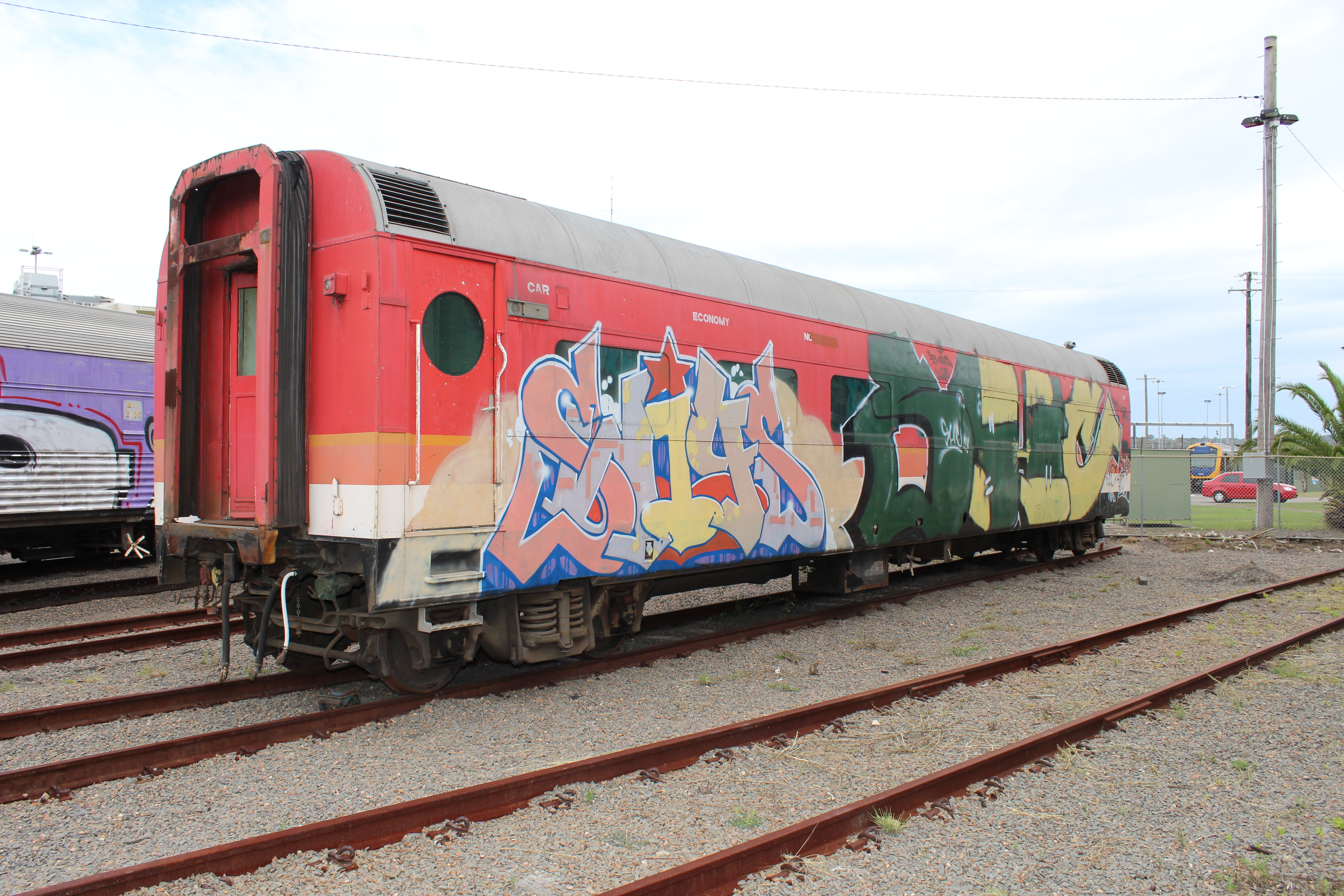
Composite Class Trailer Car TC 753 in storage at Broadmeadow Locomotive Depot
