= Lithgow State Mine Heritage Park & Railway =

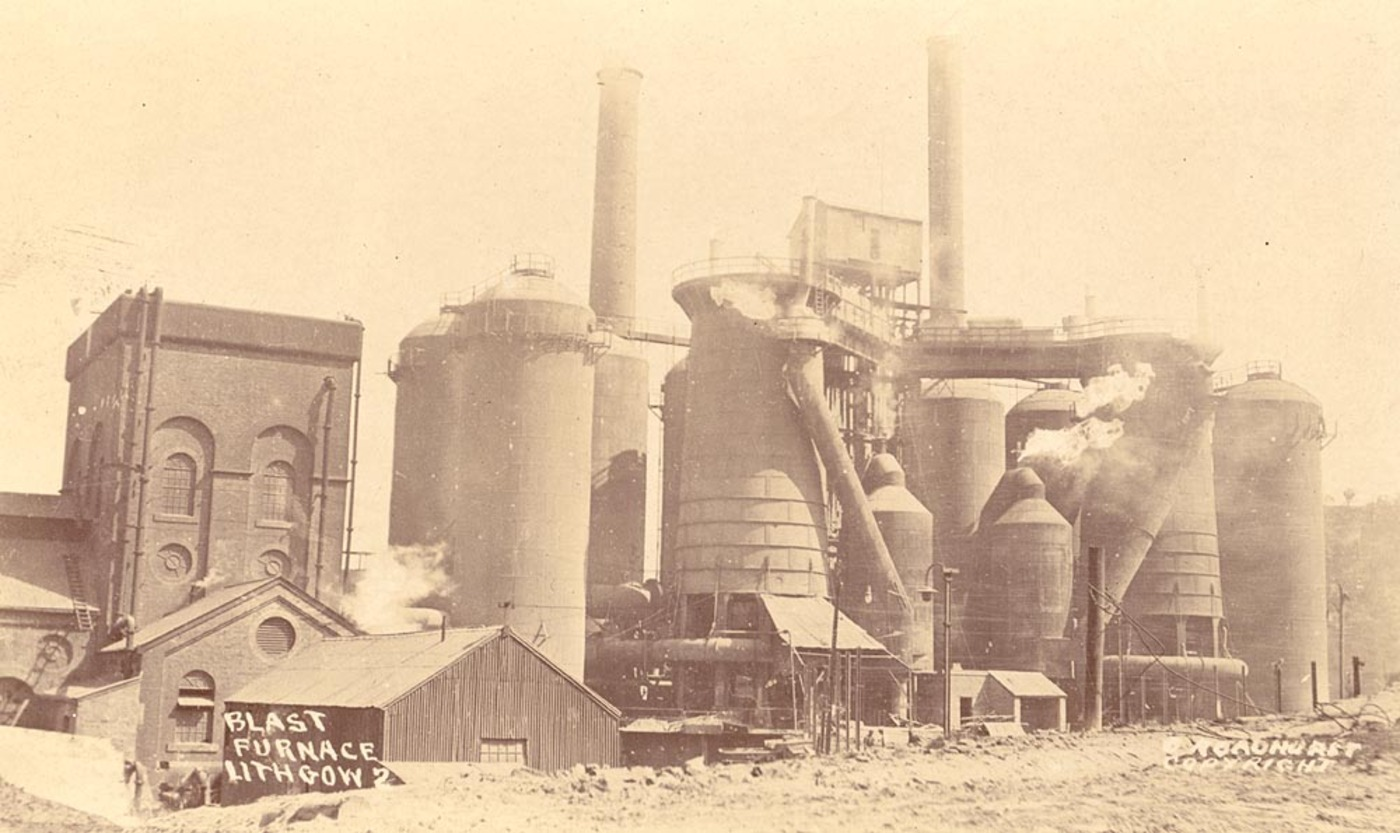
- Lithgow State Coal Mine, ca. 1900-27; (Collection of the State Library of New South Wales)
- Location: State Mine Gully Road, Lithgow, New South Wales
- Coordinates: 33°27′38″S 150°10′08″E
- Type: Railway and mining museum
- Owner: The City of Greater Lithgow Mining Museum Inc
- Website: www.statemine.org.au

The Lithgow State Mine Heritage Park & Railway is an Australian railway and mining museum, located in the Central Tablelands city of Lithgow, New South Wales.

== Collection ==
The museum is principally a museum of coalmining and related industries. The aim of the project is the showcase the industrial history of the western coalfield of New South Wales.

The mining museum contains Australia's most comprehensive collection of coalmining artefacts, including coal cutters, coal loaders, continuous miners and underground transports. It also employs multimedia exhibits.

== Organisation and history ==
The museum is owned and operated by The City of Greater Lithgow Mining Museum Inc. The museum was developed from 1990 when the former Lithgow State Coal Mine site was given to the community of Lithgow by the now delisted mining company, Austen & Butta Limited.

The museum is located on the northern outskirts of Lithgow on the site of the State Coal Mine that was closed in 1964 after being damaged by floods. The museum is connected to the Main Western railway line via a 1.5 kilometre branch from Lithgow yard. In 1976 the site was sold to Austin & Butta Collieries who donated the site to the City of Lithgow in 1990 with restoration work commencing shortly after. In October 2001 a fire destroyed the carriage shed and a number of items of rolling stock.

The site is also used by Southern Shorthaul Railroad as a maintenance depot.
