= List of named passenger trains of Australia =

This article contains a list of named passenger trains in Australia. It includes both historic and current train services.

| Train Name | Operator | Train Endpoints | Operated |
|---|---|---|---|
| Albany Progress | Western Australian Government Railways | Perth – Albany | 31 May 1961 – 1 December 1978 |
| Albany Weekender | Western Australian Government Railways | Perth – Albany | 7 November 1964 – 1 August 1975 |
| The Alice | State Rail Authority / Australian National | Sydney Central – Alice Springs | 21 November 1983 – 2 November 1987 |
| Australind | Transwa | Perth – Bunbury | 24 November 1947–present |
| AvonLink | Transwa | Midland – Northam | 24 September 1995–present |
| Bathurst Bullet | NSW TrainLink | Sydney Central – Bathurst | 21 October 2012–present |
| Brisbane Express | New South Wales Government Railways | Sydney Central – South Brisbane | September 1930–1973 |
| Brisbane Limited | New South Wales Government Railways | Sydney Central – South Brisbane | 1888 – February 1990 |
| Bunbury Belle | Western Australian Government Railways | Perth – Bunbury | 6 June 1964 – 27 July 1975 |
| Canberra Express | State Rail Authority | Sydney Central – Canberra | 31 May 1982 – January 1994 |
| Canberra Monaro Express | New South Wales Government Railways | Sydney Central – Canberra / Cooma | May 1955 – September 1988 |
| Capricornian | Queensland Rail | Brisbane Roma Street – Rockhampton | 1970 – 1993 |
| Caves Express | New South Wales Government Railways | Sydney Central – Mount Victoria | 11 November 1929 – 4 October 1942 |
| Central West Express | New South Wales Government Railways | Sydney Central – Dubbo / Parkes | June 1941–present |
| The Chips | NSW TrainLink | Sydney Central – Mount Victoria / Lithgow (originally Springwood) | 1958–present |
| Cooma Mail | New South Wales Government Railways | Sydney Central – Cooma | May 1889 – May 1986 |
| Elvis Express | NSW TrainLink | Sydney Central – Parkes | January 2004–present |
| Far West Express | New South Wales Government Railways | Dubbo – Bourke / Cobar / Coonamble | December 1957 – September 1975 |
| Federal City Express | New South Wales Government Railways | Sydney Central – Canberra | 27 September 1936 – 8 May 1955 |
| The Fish | NSW TrainLink | Sydney Central – Lithgow (originally Parramatta) | 1958–present |
| The Ghan | Journey Beyond | Since 1980 (standard gauge): Adelaide – Darwin. Before 1980 (narrow gauge): Port Augusta–Alice Springs. | 1980–present (informal name only before 1980) |
| The Gippslander | Victorian Railways | Melbourne Southern Cross – Bairnsdale | 1954–present |
| Gold Coast Motorail | Public Transport Commission | Sydney Central – Murwillumbah | March 1973 – February 1990 |
| Grafton Express | New South Wales Government Railways | Sydney Central – Grafton | June 1990–present |
| Great South Pacific Express | Queensland Rail, Orient-Express Hotels Ltd | Kuranda railway station – Sydney Central | April 1999–June 2003 |
| Great Southern | Journey Beyond Rail Expeditions | Adelaide Parklands Terminal – Brisbane Roma Street | 9 December 2019–present |
| The Gulflander | Queensland Rail | Normanton – Croydon | 1891–present |
| Indian Pacific | Journey Beyond Rail Expeditions | Sydney Central – East Perth | 23 February 1970–present |
| Inlander | Queensland Rail | Townsville – Mount Isa | 21 February 1953–present |
| Intercapital Daylight | New South Wales Government Railways / Victorian Railways | Sydney Central – Melbourne Spencer Street | 16 April 1962 – 31 August 1991 |
| Iron Triangle Limited | Australian National | Adelaide Parklands Terminal – Whyalla | 21 April 1986 – 31 December 1990 |
| The Kalgoorlie | Western Australian Government Railways | Perth – Kalgoorlie | 3 December 1962 – 28 November 1971 |
| MerredinLink | Transwa | East Perth – Merredin | June 2004–present |
| The Midlander | Queensland Railways | Rockhampton – Winton | 1954 – November 1993 |
| The Midlander | Western Australian Government Railways | Perth – Geraldton | 2 September 1964 – 28 July 1975 |
| The Mullewa | Western Australian Government Railways | Perth – Mullewa | 30 October 1961 – 17 March 1974 |
| Newcastle Flyer | New South Wales Government Railways | Sydney Central – Newcastle | November 1929 – April 1988 |
| North Coast Daylight Express | New South Wales Government Railways | Sydney Central – Grafton | November 1951 – February 1990 |
| North Coast Mail | New South Wales Government Railways | Sydney Central – Murwillumbah | ???? – August 1985 |
| North Coast Overnight Express | State Rail Authority | Sydney Central – Murwillumbah | July 1982–November 1998 |
| Northern Mail | New South Wales Government Railways | Sydney Central – Moree / Tenterfield | ~1870 – 27 November 1988 |
| Northern Tablelands Express | New South Wales Government Railways | Sydney Central – Moree / Glen Innes | June 1941–1993 |
| Outback Xplorer | NSW TrainLink | Sydney Central – Broken Hill | March 1996–present |
| The Overland | Journey Beyond Rail Expeditions | Adelaide Parklands Terminal – Melbourne Southern Cross (originally Adelaide – Melbourne Spencer Street) | 19 January 1887–present |
| Prospector | Transwa | East Perth – Kalgoorlie | 29 November 1971–present |
| Riverina Express | New South Wales Government Railways | Sydney Central – Albury / Griffith | September 1949 – December 1964 |
| Savannahlander | Cairns Kuranda Steam | Cairns – Forsayth | 3 April 1995–present |
| The Shopper | Western Australian Government Railways | Perth – Bunbury | 1 June 1964 – 31 July 1975 |
| Silver City Comet | New South Wales Government Railways | Orange – Broken Hill | 27 September 1937 – 3 November 1989 |
| Silver City Limited | Australian National | Adelaide Parklands Terminal – Broken Hill | 14 December 1986 – 31 December 1990 |
| South Coast Daylight Express | New South Wales Government Railways | Sydney Central – Bomaderry | 1933 – January 1991 |
| Southern Aurora | New South Wales Government Railways / Victorian Railways | Melbourne Spencer Street – Sydney Central | 16 April 1962 – 2 August 1986 |
| Southern Highlands Express | New South Wales Government Railways | Sydney Central – Goulburn | ???? – 199? |
| Tea and Sugar Train | Commonwealth Railways, Australian National | Port Augusta – Kalgoorlie | 1917 – 30 August 1996 |
| The Southern Spirit | Great Southern Rail | Various routes | 9 January 2010 – February 2012 |
| South Mail | New South Wales Government Railways | Sydney Central – Albury | ???? – May 1985 |
| Spirit of Capricorn | Queensland Rail | Brisbane Roma Street – Rockhampton | 1988 – 24 May 2003 |
| Spirit of Progress | Victorian Railways | Melbourne Spencer Street – Albury (to Sydney Central from 16 April 1962) | 17 November 1937 – 2 August 1986 |
| Spirit of Queensland | Queensland Rail | Brisbane Roma Street – Cairns | 28 October 2013–present |
| Spirit of the Outback | Queensland Rail | Brisbane Roma Street – Longreach | November 1993–present |
| Spirit of the Tropics | Queensland Rail | Brisbane Roma Street – Townsville | 1994–2005 |
| Spirit of the West | South Spur Rail Services | East Perth – Leighton / West Toodyay | October 2002–May 2008 |
| The Sunlander | Queensland Rail | Brisbane Roma Street – Cairns | 4 June 1953 – 31 December 2014 |
| Sydney Express | New South Wales Government Railways / Victorian Railways | Melbourne Spencer Street – Sydney Central | 1883 – 1937 |
| Sydney/Melbourne Express | State Rail Authority / V/Line | Melbourne Spencer Street – Sydney Central | 3 August 1986 – 20 November 1991 |
| Tasman Limited | Tasmanian Government Railways | Hobart – Wynyard | April 1954 – 28 July 1978 |
| Trans Australian | Commonwealth Railways / Australian National / Western Australian Government Railways | Perth / Kalgoorlie – Port Augusta / Adelaide Keswick | 1917 – 27 June 1991 |
| The Vinelander | Victorian Railways | Melbourne Spencer Street – Mildura | 9 August 1972 – 12 September 1993 |
| Western Mail | Public Transport Commission / State Rail Authority | Sydney Central – Dubbo / Forbes | 1973 – 27 November 1988 |
| The Westland | Western Australian Government Railways | Perth – Kalgoorlie | 4 June 1938 – 15 June 1969 |
| The Westlander | Queensland Rail | Brisbane Roma Street – Charleville | August 1954–present |
| The West Coaster | Emu Bay Railway | Burnie – Rosebery | 17 October 1960 – 2 January 1964 |

Australia is the only continent to offer both east–west and north–south transcontinental trains: The Indian Pacific from Sydney on the Pacific to Perth on the Indian Oceans, and The Ghan from Adelaide on the southern shores of the continent to Darwin on the northern shore.

== See also ==
- List of named trains in Victoria
