= Southern Highlands Express =

Former train service in Australia

Overview
- Service type: Passenger train
- Status: Ceased
- Former operator: State Rail Authority

Route
- Termini: Sydney; Goulburn
- Distance travelled: 225 kilometres (140 mi)
- Service frequency: Daily in each direction
- Train numbers: SL19 and SL20
- Line used: Main South

The Southern Highlands Express was an Australian passenger train operating on the Main South line in New South Wales from Sydney to Goulburn.

It was the last service out of Sydney rostered to be hauled by steam locomotive, 3801 hauling the final service on 10 October 1969. Its headcode was SL19/SL20.

For a time from June 1981 it was extended to Canberra.

Until June 1970, it was formed of a dedicated set of R set carriages. It was then formed of N set carriages before being replaced by air-conditioned HUB and RUB carriages released from the North Coast Overnight Express in late 1988. In May 1990 it was again extended to Canberra, stopping at all stations south of Campbelltown.

The Southern Highlands Express ceased running in the early 1990s.

The current morning service from Goulburn direct to Central and afternoon service from Central direct to Goulburn perform a similar function to the Southern Highlands Express, but are not named as such in the timetable.
