= Grafton Express =

Passenger train service in Australia

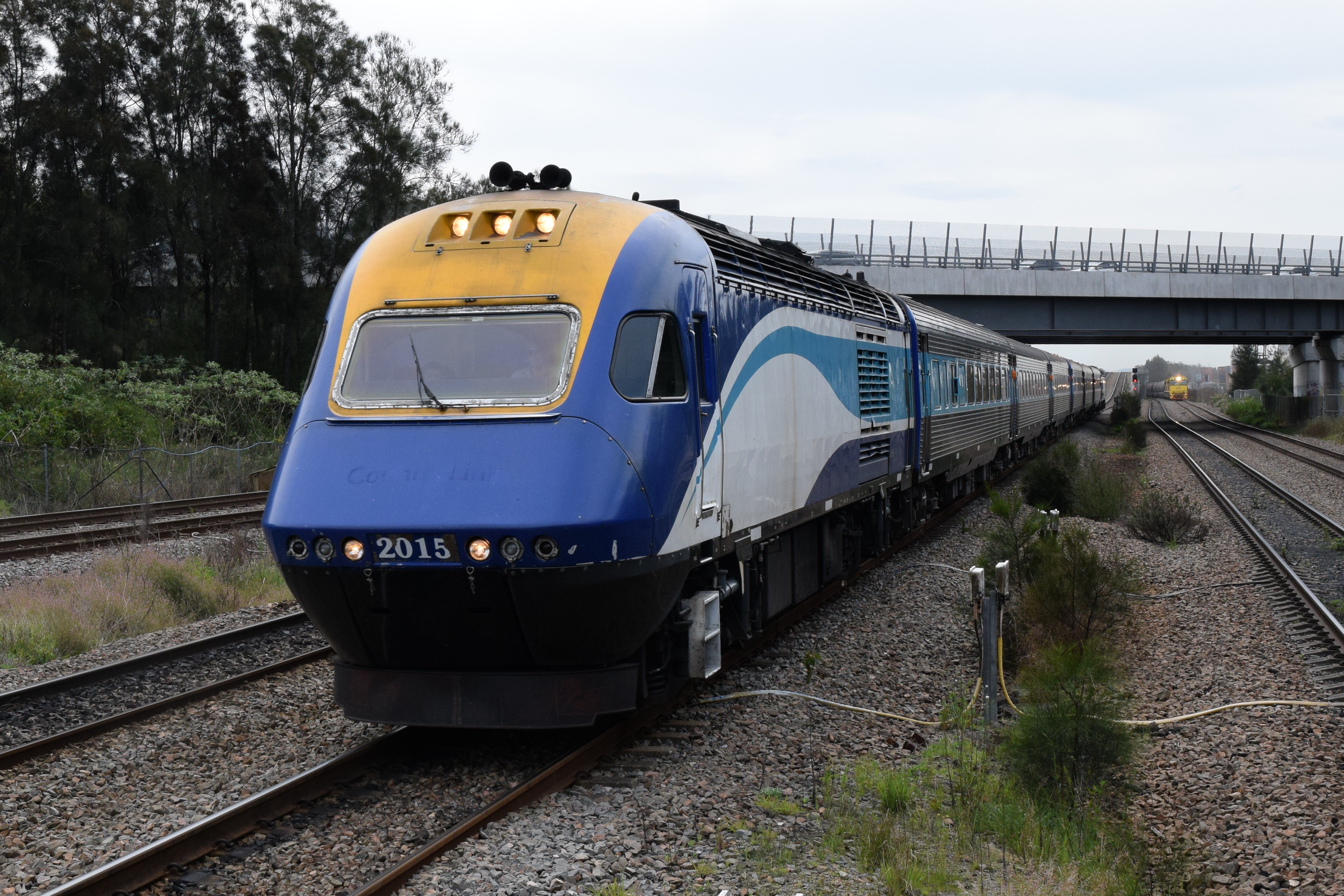
- An XPT in the Hunter Valley

Overview
- Service type: Passenger train
- Status: Operational
- First service: June 1990
- Current operator: NSW TrainLink
- Former operators: CountryLink; State Rail Authority

Route
- Termini: Sydney; Grafton
- Distance travelled: 696 kilometres
- Service frequency: Daily in each direction
- Line used: North Coast

Technical
- Rolling stock: XPT

The Grafton Express is the name for the Australian passenger train service operating between Sydney and Grafton via the North Coast line.

In February 1990, the long-standing Holiday Coast XPT was axed as part of a restructure of CountryLink services. With the other XPT services struggling to keep up with weekend demand, in June 1990 a service to Grafton was reinstated. It ran on Fridays only to Grafton and Sundays only to Sydney but during school holidays ran daily. It was formed of locomotive hauled HUB/RUB stock with the headcode NL35/NL36.

Initially hauled by 86 class electric locomotives south of Broadmeadow, however from March 1992 it was hauled by diesel locomotives throughout usually a 442 class. The locomotive hauled Grafton Express last ran in November 1993.

With the National Party having lost a number of North Coast seats in the 1990 Federal election in a policy reversal it was announced that Xplorer railcars would be purchased to extend the Northern Tablelands Express with an XPT to be released to operate a daily service to Grafton. Thus in November 1993 the Grafton XPT began, a service that continues today.
