= Canberra Express =

Australian passenger train

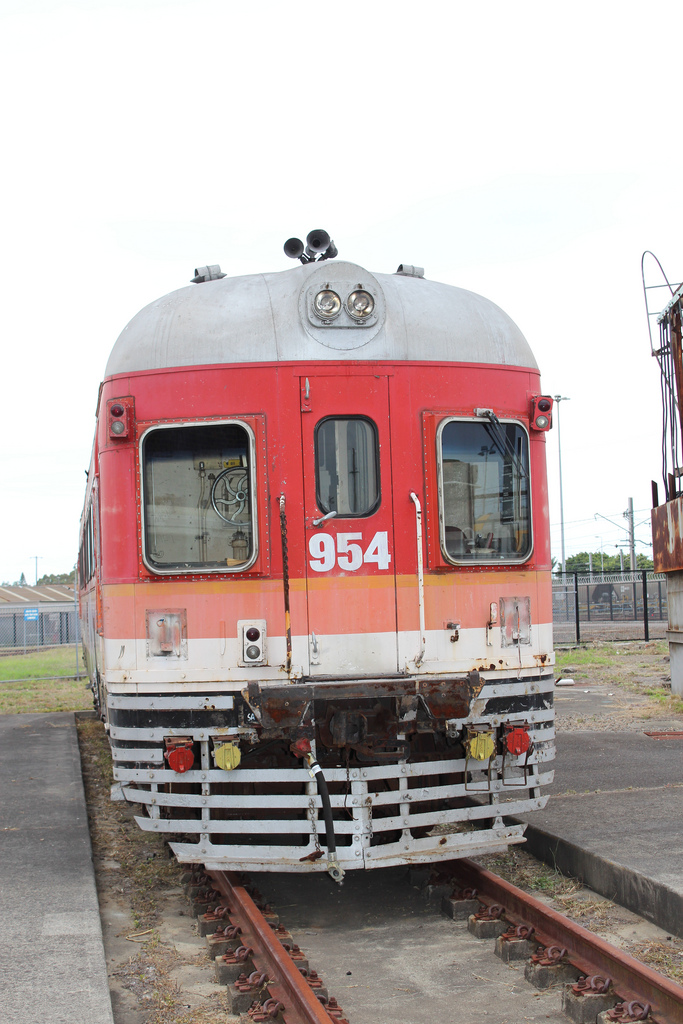
- DEB set carriage at Broadmeadow Locomotive Depot in December 2012

Overview
- Service type: Passenger train
- Status: Ceased
- First service: 31 May 1982
- Last service: January 1994
- Former operator: State Rail Authority

Route
- Termini: Sydney; Canberra
- Distance travelled: 330 kilometres (210 mi)
- Service frequency: Once daily in each direction
- Train numbers: S21 and S22
- Lines used: Main South; Bombala; Canberra

The Canberra Express was an Australian passenger train operated by the NSW State Rail Authority between Sydney and Canberra via the main south line from May 1982 until January 1994.

It was introduced in May 1982 being operated by DEB railcar sets. In August 1983 it was converted to XPT operation and renamed the Canberra XPT. In February 1990 the XPT was replaced by HUB/RUB rolling stock.

It ceased in January 1994 following the introduction of Xplorers to the route.
