= Gold Coast Motorail =

Former railway passenger service in New South Wales, Australia

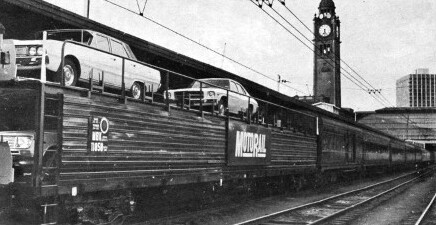
- Gold Coast Motorail at Sydney Central

Overview
- Service type: Passenger train
- Status: Ceased
- First service: 3 March 1973
- Last service: 11 February 1990
- Successor: Unnamed XPT service
- Former operator: State Rail Authority

Route
- Termini: Sydney Central; Murwillumbah
- Distance travelled: 934 kilometres (580 mi)
- Service frequency: Once nightly in each direction
- Train numbers: NL3 and NL4
- Line used: North Coast

Technical
- Rolling stock: HUB; RUB stainless steel sleepers

The Gold Coast Motorail was an Australian passenger train operated by the Public Transport Commission from March 1973 until February 1990.

It operated from Sydney via the North Coast line to Murwillumbah. It departed Central railway station in Sydney. It was formed of air-conditioned HUB/RUB sitting carriages along with stainless steel sleepers as well as having a motorail facility. Its headcode was NL3/NL4.

In May 1987, it was renamed the Pacific Coast Motorail. In February 1990 it was replaced by an unnamed XPT service.
