= Central West Express =

Passenger train service in Australia

- XPT at Dubbo railway station in January 2026

Overview
- Service type: Passenger train
- Status: Operational
- First service: June 1941
- Current operator: NSW TrainLink

Route
- Termini: Sydney; Dubbo
- Distance travelled: 462 kilometres
- Average journey time: 6 hours 30 minutes
- Service frequency: Daily in each direction
- Line used: Main Western

Technical
- Rolling stock: XPT

The Central West Express is the named Australian passenger train service operating on the Main Western line in New South Wales from Sydney to Dubbo.

== History ==
The Central West Express commenced operating in June 1941 operating on alternate days from Sydney to Dubbo and Parkes. In the early 1950s it received air-conditioned RUB sets and began to be hauled by 42 and 43 class diesel locomotives, although steam locomotives of the 36 and 38 classes would regularly haul it until July 1967.

In September 1956 in a reorganisation of rolling stock, the Central West Express was cut back to operate as a day return service to Orange with the RUB sets replaced by a HUB set. From 1957, the service was hauled by 46 class electric locomotives between Sydney and Lithgow following the electrification of the Main Western line over the Blue Mountains.

The service was selected as the first to be converted to XPT operation. Rebranded the Central West XPT, it commenced operating in April 1982. Initially it operated six days a week to Orange extending to Dubbo on alternate days. From August 1983 all services ran to Dubbo and from December 1985 a Sunday service was introduced, a frequency it still maintains. The XPTs cut one hour and 54 minutes off the travel time from Sydney to Dubbo.

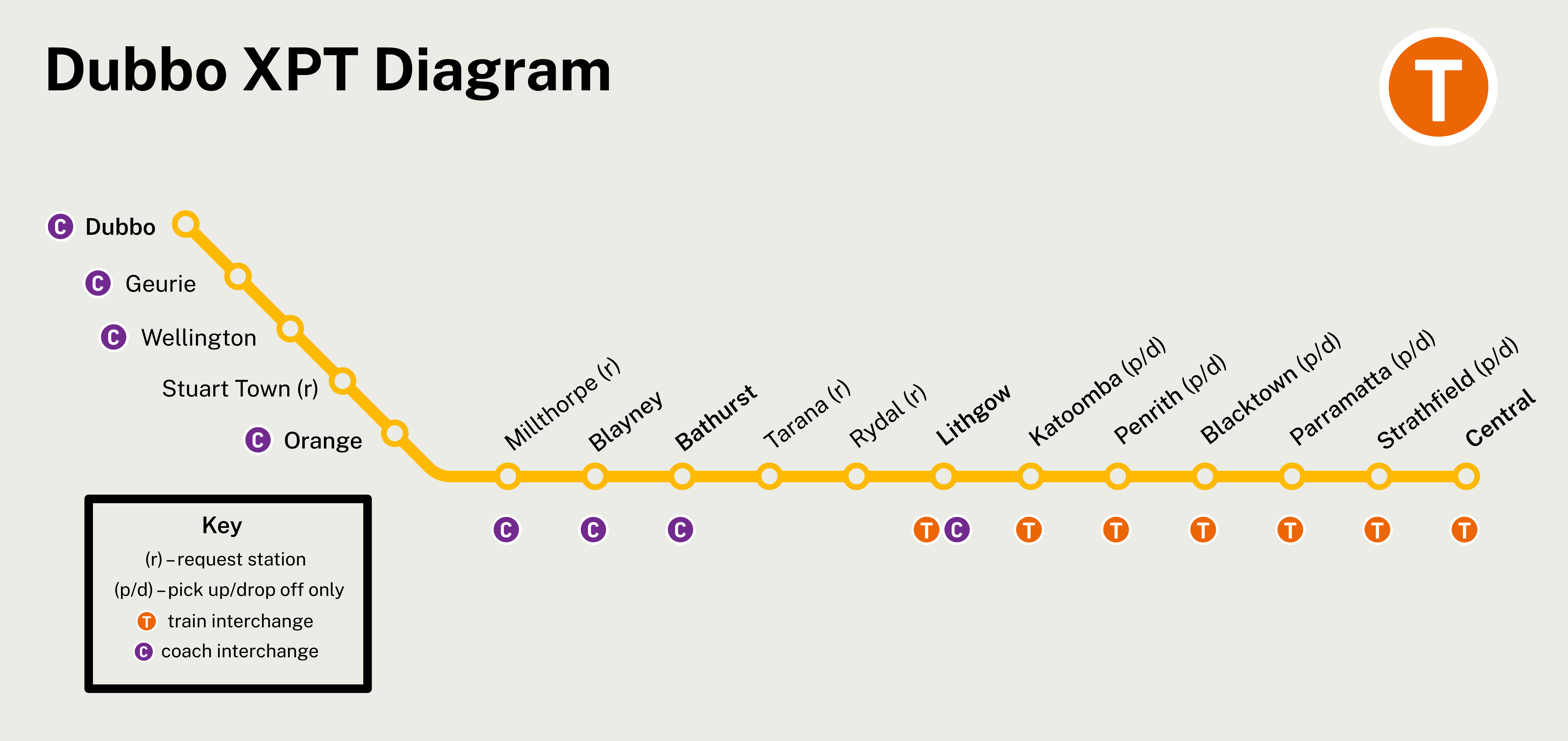
Diagram of the Central West Express.

== Gallery ==
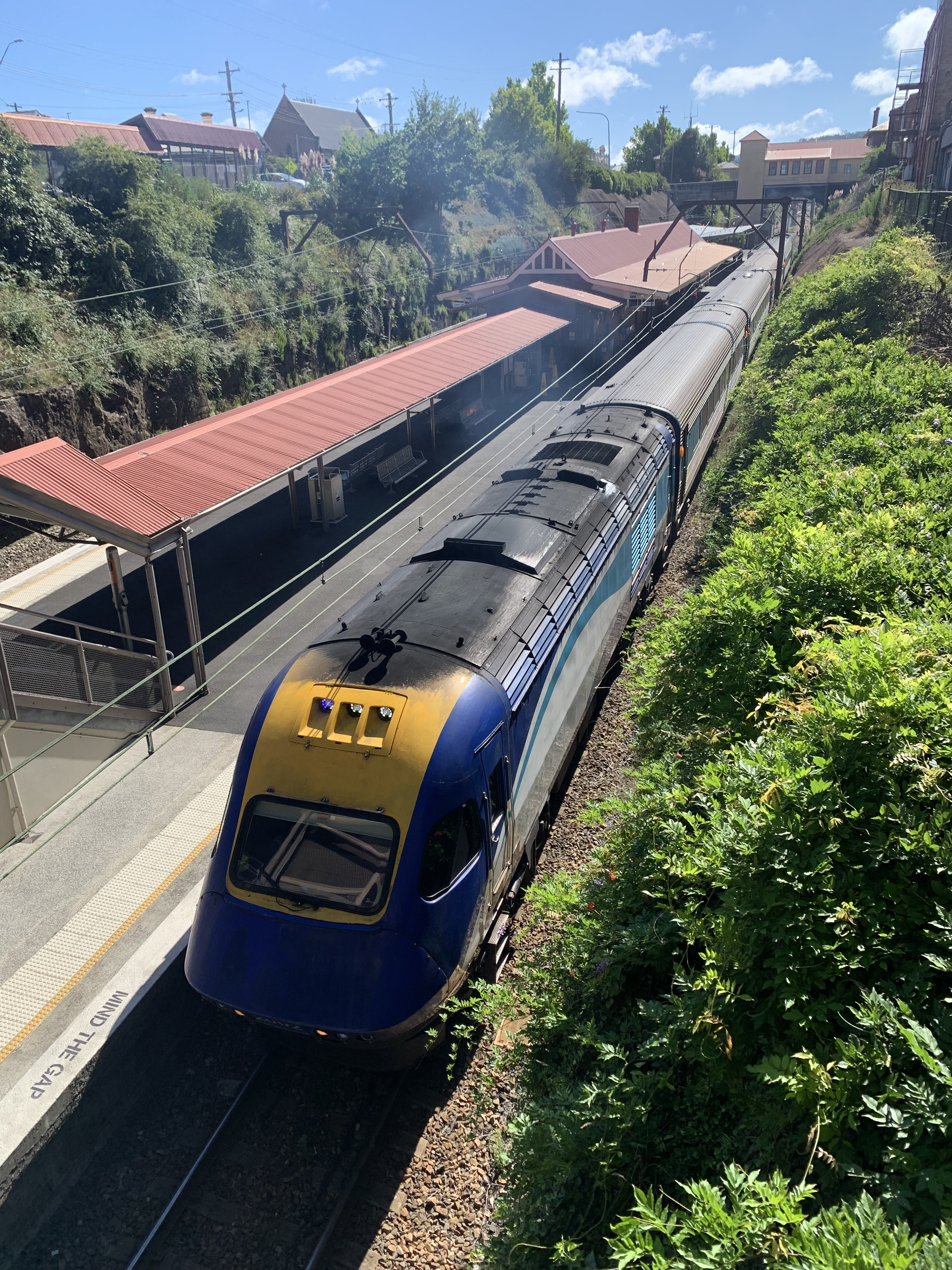
At Lithgow in 2025

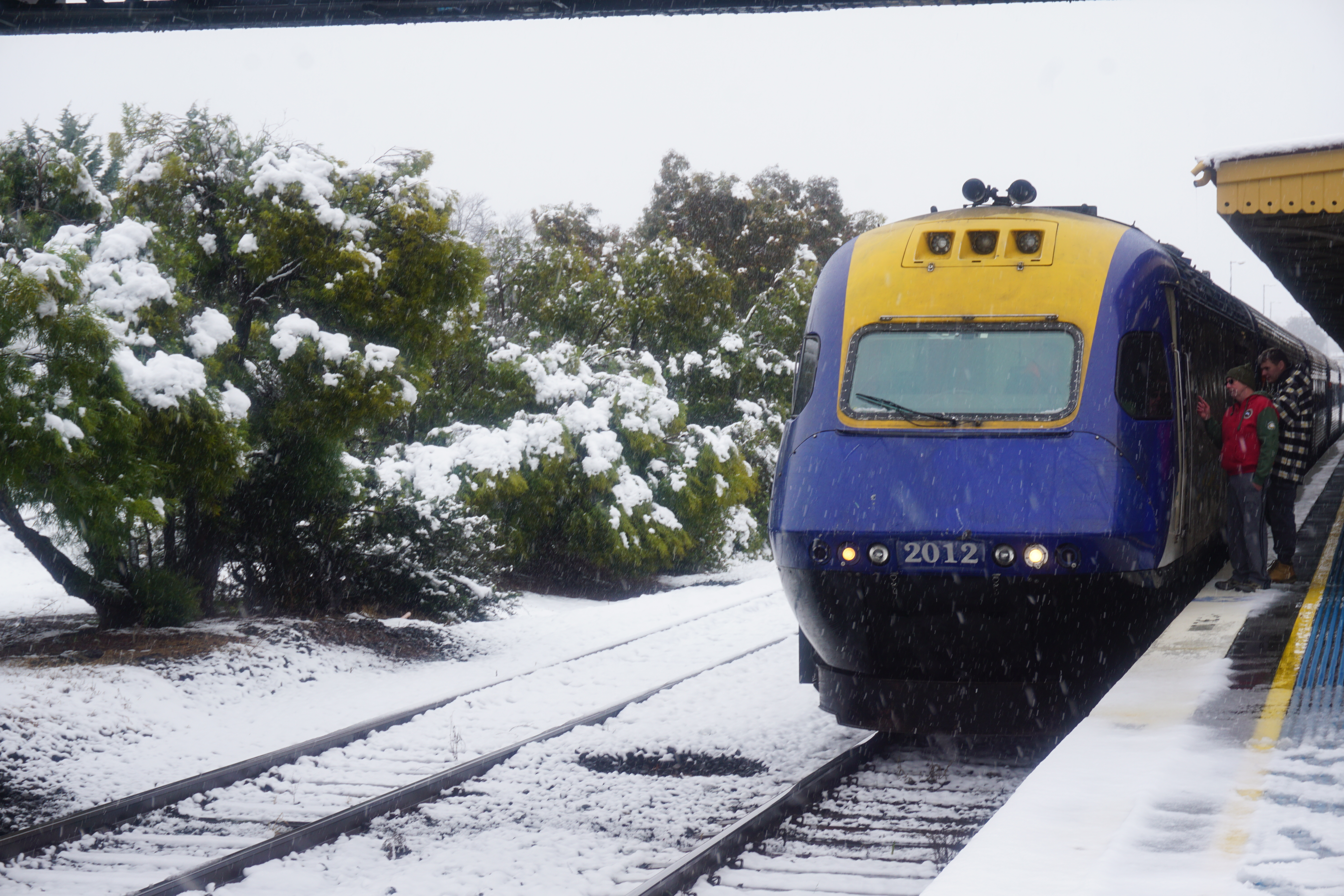
At Orange in the snow in 2020

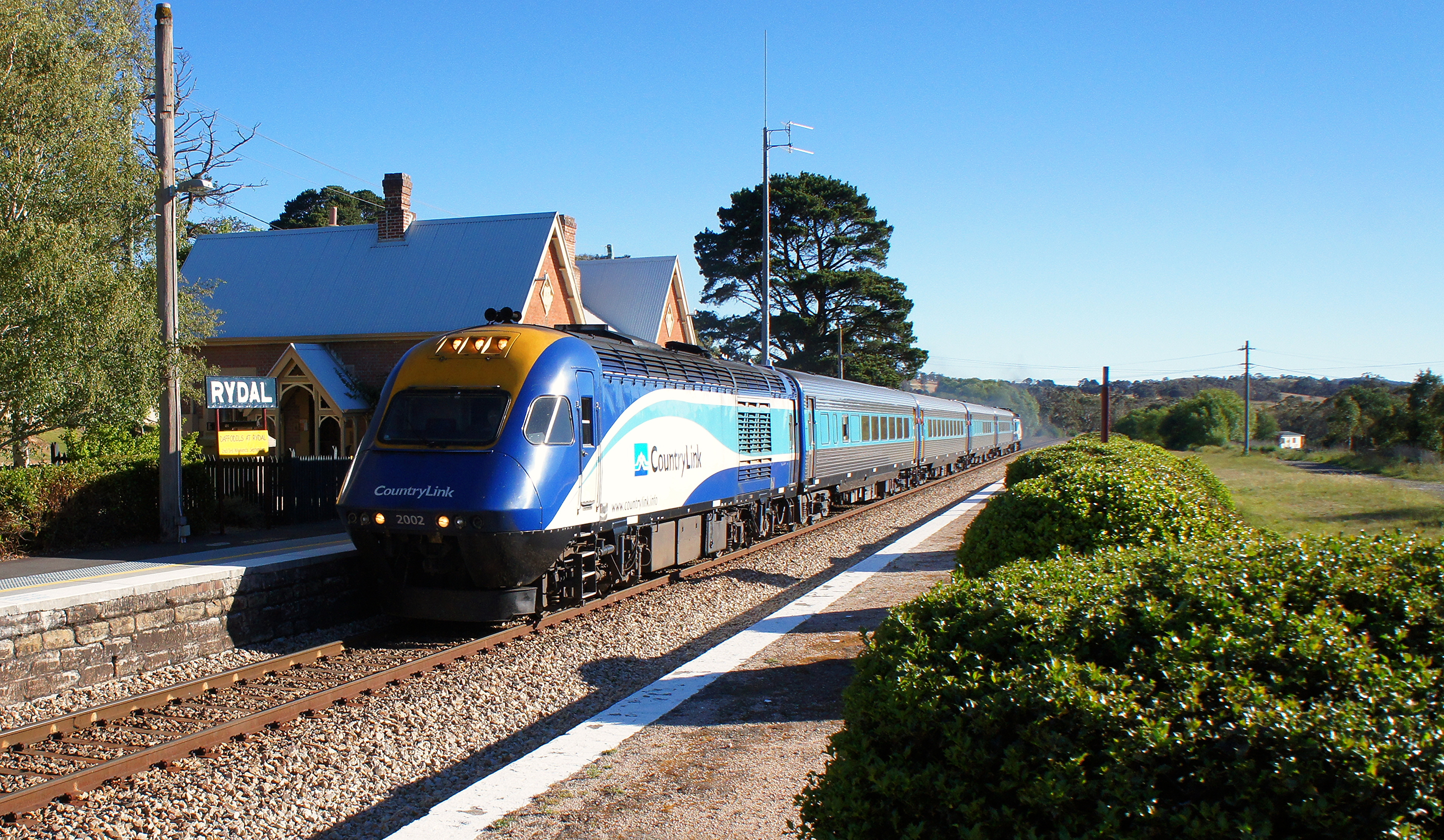
At Rydal in 2013

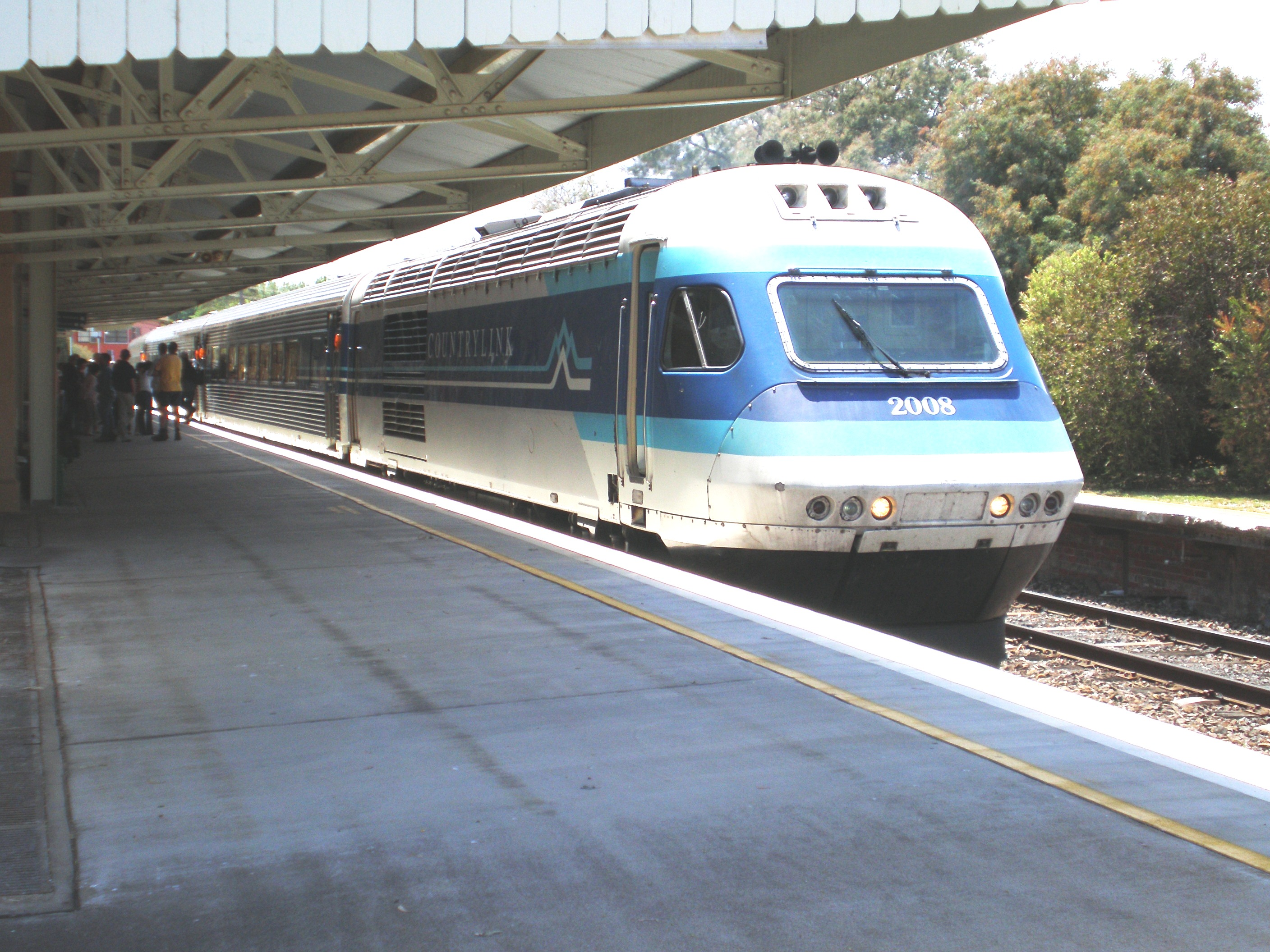
At Bathurst in 2006
