= Intercapital Daylight =

Former Australian passenger train service

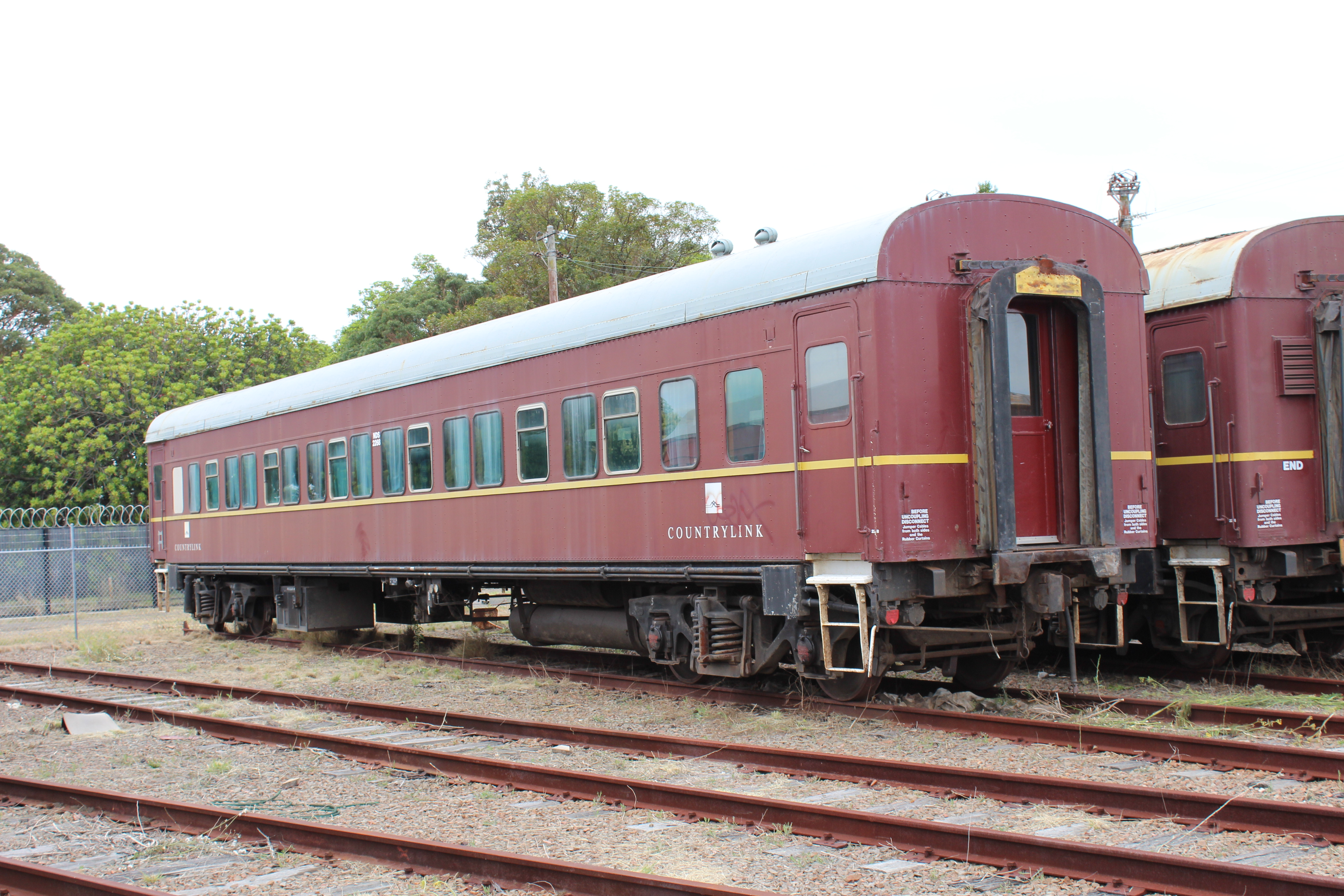
- RUB carriage at Broadmeadow Locomotive Depot in December 2012

Overview
- Service type: Passenger train
- Status: Ceased
- First service: 26 March 1956
- Last service: 31 August 1991
- Former operators: State Rail Authority; V/Line

Route
- Termini: Sydney; Melbourne
- Distance travelled: 956 kilometres (594 mi)
- Service frequency: Once daily in each direction
- Train numbers: SL65 and SL66
- Lines used: Main South, NSW; North East, Victoria

Technical
- Rolling stock: RUB sets

The Intercapital Daylight was a passenger train that operated between Australia's two largest cities, Sydney and Melbourne from March 1956 until August 1991. The name is sometimes used for the present Express Passenger Train (XPT) service.

== History ==
Until April 1962, the line between Sydney and Albury was of a different gauges to that between Albury and Melbourne, requiring passengers to change trains.

On 26 March 1956, the New South Wales Government Railways and Victorian Railways introduced connecting daytime services named the Sydney–Melbourne (Melbourne–Sydney) Daylight Express. From Sydney, a three times per week service was introduced, returning from Albury the following day. From Melbourne, a three times per week non-stop service operated in the morning, returning in the evening.

From 24 September 1956, both were extended to operate daily Monday to Saturday. Total journey time between the capitals was 13 hours and 20 minutes. The New South Wales train consisted of a 42 class locomotive hauling a nine carriage air-conditioned RUB set. The Victorian portion had a B class locomotive hauling eight air-conditioned S and Z carriages including the round-ended car ex Spirit of Progress, formerly known as Parlor car and renamed to Lounge car but later Club car, attached to the rear.

Following the completion of the standard gauge to Melbourne, the New South Wales train was extended to Melbourne from 16 April 1962. Named Inter-Capital Daylight, the train was formed of a nine carriage New South Wales Government Railways RUB set later extended to eleven carriages. The trains were initially hauled by New South Wales 44 class and the Victorian S class locomotives. During the 1970s the 422 class became the rostered power in New South Wales while the X class shared the Victorian duties with the S class.

A typical consist in the late 1980s would be Locomotive-HFZ-VFK-VFK-ABS, or Locomotive-RS-BDS-SDS-SDS, with either a PHN or PHS power van attached.

From 1982, through working was introduced with the 422 class rostered to operate the services throughout. Class 442s occasionally operated the service in the mid-1980s during the time they were permitted to operate in Victoria. Other mainline locomotives were regularly used. Following a ban being placed by the Victorian branch of the Australian Federated Union of Locomotive Enginemen on non-air-conditioned locomotives in Victoria, from February 1990 the service was rostered for 81 class and G class locomotives. The superior power of these locomotives was negated by them being limited to 100 km/h (vs 115 km/h) in Victoria due to the condition of the track. By this stage the journey time was 12 hours 30 minutes.

The train length varied from seven to 13 carriages, with V/Line Z type carriages also appearing from February 1990. A motorail facility was introduced in October 1987 but due to low loadings withdrawn in 1990 on the train.

Since mid-1990, the State Rail Authority and V/Line had been discussing the replacement of the stock with an XPT from 1993. However, with deregulation of the Australian airline industry, patronage dropped to around 30%. A decision was made to cancel the service with the last service operating on 31 August 1991. Appropriately, the last services were hauled in New South Wales by 44 class 4458/27 on the Melbourne bound service and 4465/69 on the Sydney bound service, while X class X37 handled the Victorian duties.

In December 1994, a daylight service between Sydney and Melbourne was reintroduced with New South Wales XPT trains, by extending the Riverina Express from Albury.

== See also ==
- Southern Aurora
- Spirit of Progress
- Sydney/Melbourne Express
