= North Coast Overnight Express =

Former overnight rail service in New South Wales, Australia

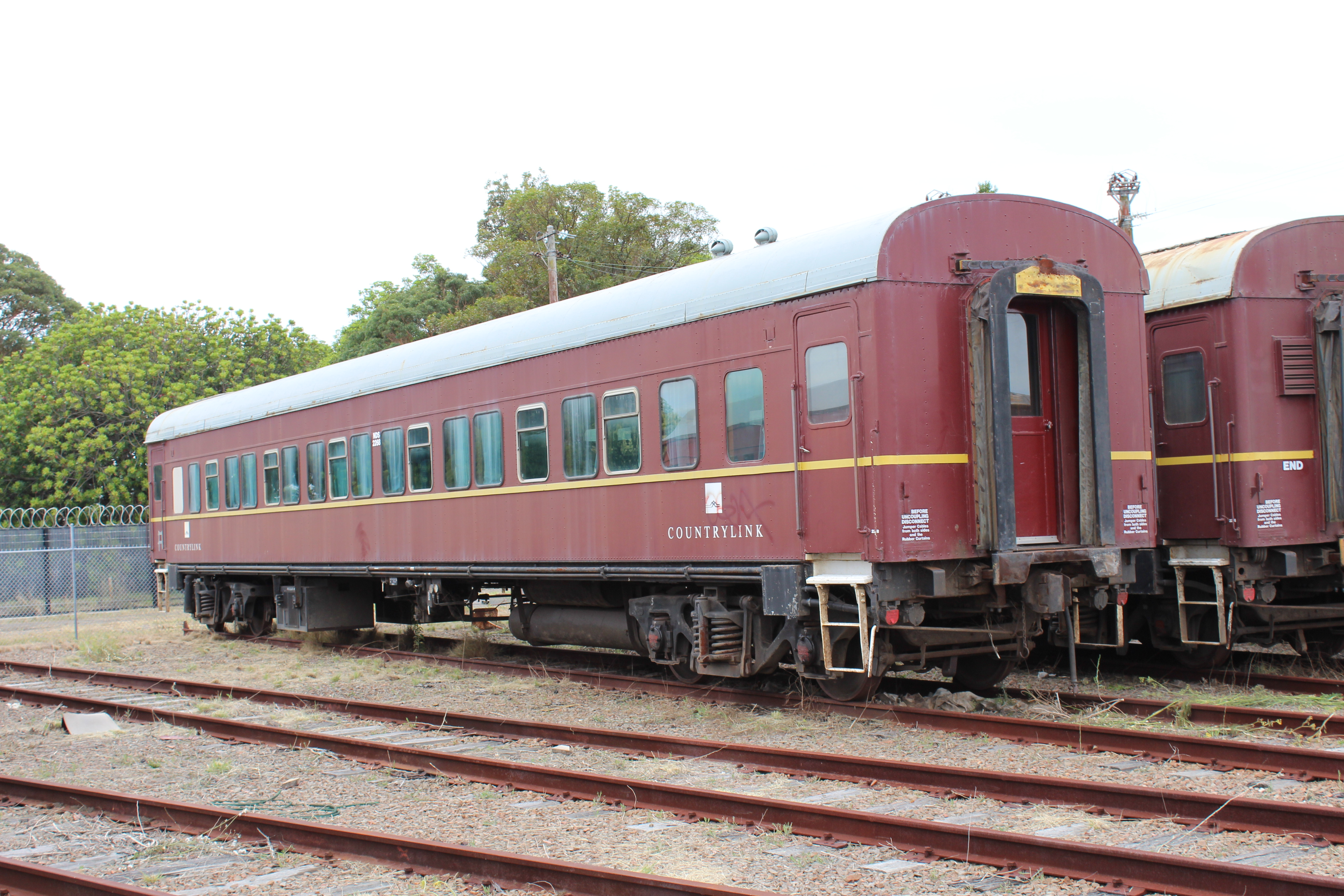
- RUB carriage at Broadmeadow Locomotive Depot in December 2012

Overview
- Service type: Passenger train
- Status: Ceased
- First service: July 1982
- Last service: November 1988
- Former operator: State Rail Authority

Route
- Termini: Sydney; Murwillumbah
- Distance travelled: 810 kilometres (500 mi)
- Service frequency: Once daily in each direction
- Train numbers: NL5 and NL6
- Line used: North Coast

Technical
- Rolling stock: HUB; RUB

The North Coast Overnight Express was an Australian passenger train operated by the State Rail Authority from July 1982 until November 1988.

It operated from Sydney via the North Coast line to Murwillumbah. It was formed of air-conditioned HUB/RUB stock but despite being a night train, conveyed no sleeping accommodation. Its headcode was NL5 and NL6.

In October 1985, it was truncated to Grafton and ceased operating in November 1988.
