= Glen Innes railway station, New South Wales =

Historic site in New South Wales, Australia

Glen Innes
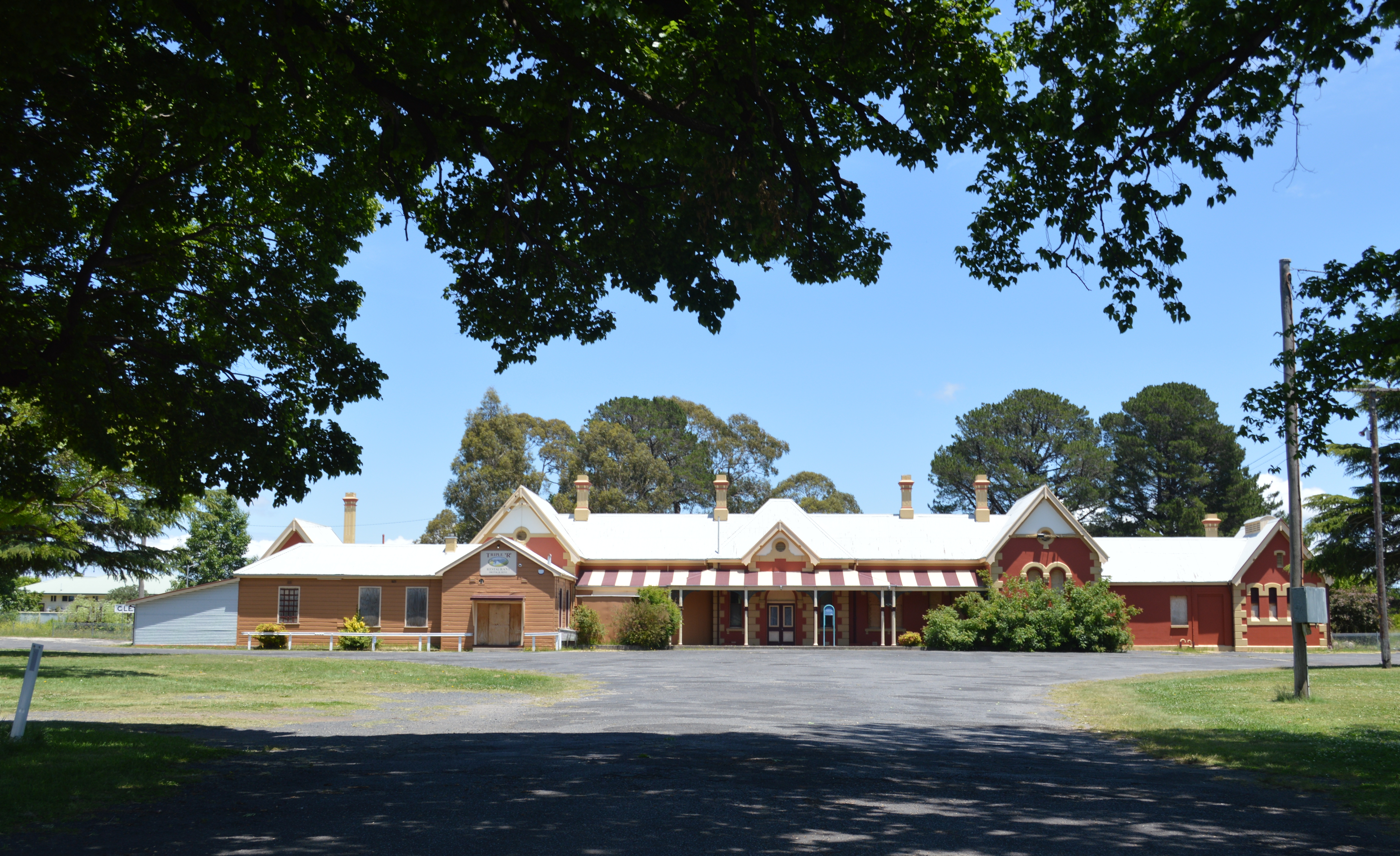
- Glen Innes railway station, 2017

General information
- Location: Lambeth Street, Glen Innes
- Coordinates: 29°44′23″S 151°43′35″E
- Owner: Transport Asset Manager of New South Wales
- Operator: State Rail Authority
- Line: Main Northern
- Distance: 681.32 kilometres from Central
- Platforms: 1
- Tracks: 3

Construction
- Structure type: Ground

Other information
- Station code: GLI

History
- Opened: 9 January 1882

Services
Preceding station	Former services	Following station
Dundee towards Wallangarra	Main Northern Line	Stonehenge towards Sydney
Location

Glen Innes railway station is a closed station located on the Main Northern line in New South Wales, Australia. It served the town of Glen Innes. It was added to the New South Wales State Heritage Register on 2 April 1999.

== History ==
The station opened on 19 August 1884 when the line was extended from Armidale. It was the terminus of the line until it was extended to Tenterfield on 1 September 1886. It has one platform with two loops.

The line closed north of Glen Innes on 22 October 1989.

The last train to regularly service Glen Innes was the overnight Northern Mail which ceased in November 1988. The Northern Tablelands Express provided a daylight service to Glen Innes until truncated in October 1985 to Armidale. The line to Glen Innes was still open in July 1992 when diesel locomotive 4499 operated a crew route learning service.

Following closure, the station building was used as a restaurant and bar for several years, and then leased to the council for the local Musicians' Guild, but is now vacant. In 2016, it was described as being in a state of disrepair and having had problems with vandalism. A community group, Business in Glen (BIG), was reported to be in negotiations to lease the building at this time; however, nothing further has been announced regarding this.

== Description ==
The station complex consists of a first-class brick station building of a type 5 design with a brick-faced platform, dating from 1884. It also includes a timber signal box, metal water tank, water column, and timber overbridge with brick piers at the Sydney end of the station yard. The forecourt plantings are also included in the station's heritage listing.

== Heritage listing ==
Glen Innes station is a country Victorian railway station. The station building is a landmark building in the town terminating the vista of Wentworth Street. It retains elements from the early period of construction including the two residences, and is an example of a first class station building which is an enlargement of the standard roadside structure with the pavilions at each end and the central entry with colonnaded verandah.

Glen Innes railway station was listed on the New South Wales State Heritage Register on 2 April 1999.
