= New South Wales RUB type carriage stock =

Type of Australian railway vehicle

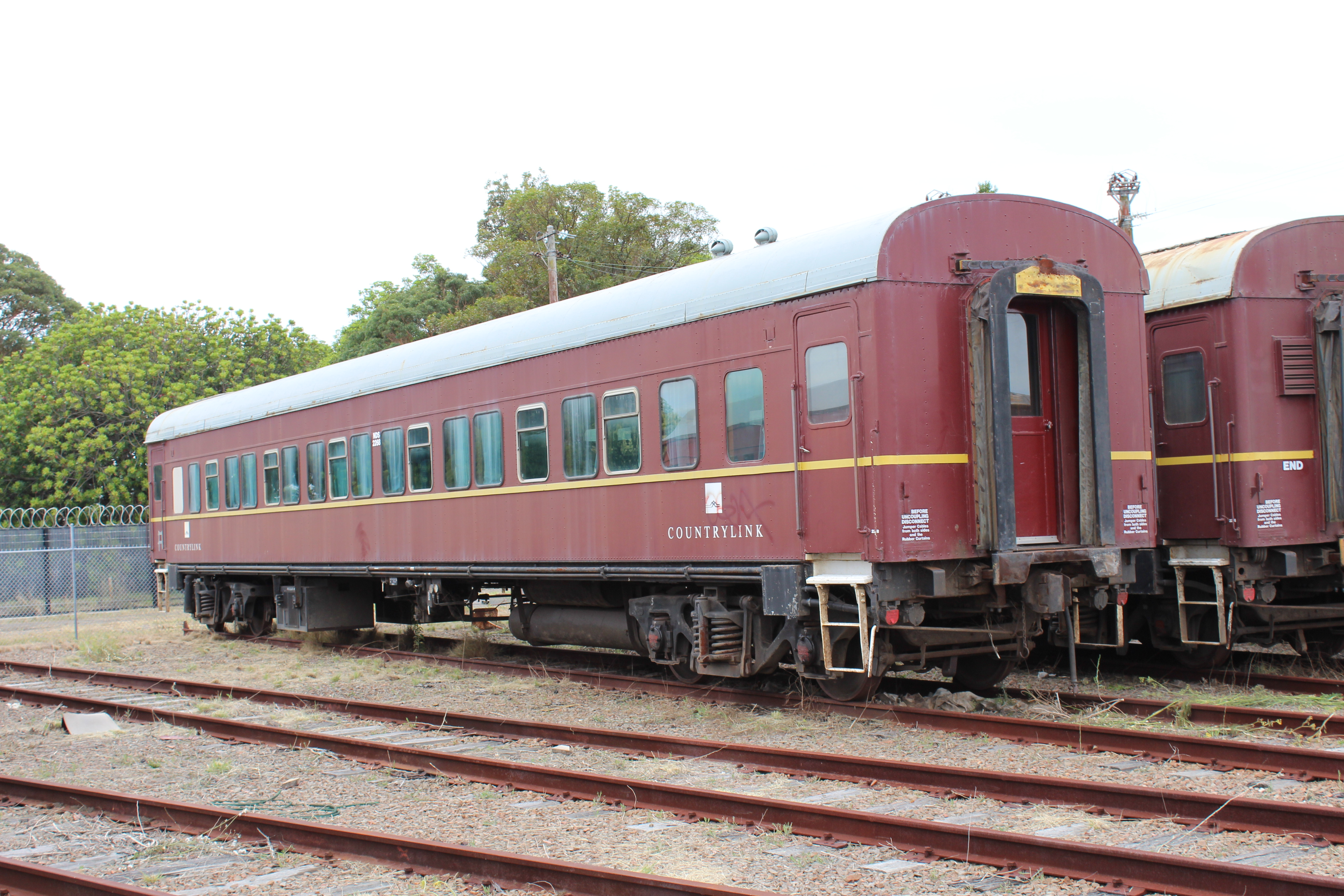
NDS 2268 at Broadmeadow Locomotive Depot in December 2012

The RUB type carriage stock is a type of steel bodied air conditioned passenger carriage operated by the New South Wales Government Railways from September 1949 until April 2000.

== History ==
In 1943, the New South Wales Government Railways awarded a contract for twenty steel sitting carriages to Waddingtons. These were to be similar to the N type carriages that had been built in 1939 but with the addition of steam heating.

=== Delays in construction & redesign as Air Conditioned Carriages ===
Construction of these cars was shelved while wartime restrictions were in place and when the project resumed in 1945, it was decided the carriages should be air-conditioned and the order increased to fifty. Work had already commenced on the underframes when it was decided to lengthen the carriages from 19.8 to 21.05 metres (65 ft 0 in to 69 ft 1 in) necessitating in the reworking of those already in production. A shortage of steel meant it would not be until 1949 that the first were completed.

The initial fifty cars numbered 2240 to 2290 were eventually built by Commonwealth Engineering, Granville (the successors to Waddingtons) between 1949 and 1952. The completed carriages consisted of seventeen first class cars coded SBS, twenty-five second class cars codes SFS, four second class cars with hostess & staff compartments coded OFS & four first class cars with hostess & staff compartments coded OBS. In 1949, Commonwealth Engineering was awarded a further contract for eight buffet cars coded RS and nine power vans coded PHS. The early carriages were fitted out by Commonwealth Engineering, later examples being completed at Eveleigh Carriage Workshops.

The completed cars were formed into eight sets numbered 140–147 of seven 21.05-metre (69 ft 1 in) carriages coupled to one 15.25-metre (50 ft 0 in) long power/brake van, the sets were given the code RUB, with two carriages and one power van built as spares. In June 1965, one additional buffet carriage was built at Eveleigh Carriage Workshops.

=== Into service ===
The first set operated a trial to Moss Vale on 10 August 1949 before being unveiled to the press on 13 September 1949.

The first entered service in September 1949 on the Riverina Express followed by the Northern Tablelands Express (April 1951), Central West Express (1952) and the North Coast Daylight Express (1953). In September 1956, the two off the Central West Express were reallocated to the Melbourne Daylight Express.

=== Formation ===
In 1951, the formation of the eight RUB sets from the Sydney end were:

Set No.	Car No.1	Car No.2 Non Smoking	Car No.3	Buffet Car	Car No.4	Car No.5 Non Smoking	Car No.6	Power Van
140	SBS 2240	SBS 2248	OFS 2257	RS 2306	SFS 2265	SFS 2273	SFS 2282	PHS 2290
141	SBS 2241	SBS 2249	OFS 2258	RS 2304	SFS 2266	SFS 2274	SFS 2283	PHS 2291
142	SBS 2242	SBS 2250	OFS 2259	RS 2299	SFS 2267	SFS 2275	SFS 2284	PHS 2292
143	SBS 2243	SBS 2251	OFS 2260	RS 2305	SFS 2268	SFS 2276	SFS 2285	PHS 2293
144	SBS 2244	SBS 2252	OBS 2261	RS 2303	SFS 2269	SFS 2277	SFS 2286	PHS 2294
145	SBS 2245	SBS 2253	OBS 2262	RS 2302	SFS 2270	SFS 2278	SFS 2287	PHS 2295
146	SBS 2246	SBS 2254	OBS 2263	RS 2301	SFS 2271	SFS 2279	SFS 2288	PHS 2296
147	SBS 2247	SBS 2245	OBS 2264	RS 2300	SFS 2272	SFS 2280	SFS 2289	PHS 2297
Spare	-	SBS 2256	-	-	-	SFS 2281	-	PHS 2298

The formation of the sets were soon altered as by early 1952 RUB set 143 was recorded as consisting of.

Set No.	Car No.1	Car No.2 Non Smoking	Buffet Car	Car No.3 Non Smoking	Car No.4	Car No.5	Car No.6	Power Van
143	SBS 2243	SBS 2251	RS 2305	OFS 2260	SFS 2268	SFS 2276	SFS 2285	PHS 2293

=== Breaking up of fixed RUB Sets ===
From the 1970s, they ceased to operate in fixed sets and at various times were used on the Brisbane Limited, Canberra Express, Gold Coast Motorail, Indian Pacific (to Broken Hill), North Coast Overnight Express, The Alice and Sydney/Melbourne Express in company with HUB, stainless steel sleeper and non air-conditioned stock.

=== Withdrawal ===
Many were withdrawn as a number of locomotive hauled services ceased in the early 1990s. Those remaining were used on CountryLink's Canberra Express and Grafton Express and CityRail services to Bomaderry and Goulburn before being replaced by Endeavour railcars from 1994.

Most were auctioned in August 1994 with the State Rail Authority retaining nine.

In late 1993 or early 1994, before the cessation of the locomotive-hauled Sydney Express and its replacement with XPT trains, the Victorian operator V/Line purchased vans PHS2294 and PHS2296, because the generator sets were very similar to those in use in their PH head end power vans.

Four were returned to service in March 1996 services to operate new services to Broken Hill and Griffith. These were replaced by Xplorers in April 2000. Some have been placed on RailCorp's heritage register.

== Carriage types ==
=== SBS, TBS TDS, SDS & SBZ First Class Cars & SBH First Class with Luggage Compartment ===
As built, the first 16 carriages (2240–2256) were given the code SBS and could seat 31 passengers in 2 and 1 rotating and inclining seats. A further 6 could be seated in a compartment next to the ladies toilet. During the 1960s ten cars were converted to 2 and 2 seats which increased the seating to 48. In 1979 to differentiate between the different seating capacities the remaining lower capacity SBS carriages were recoded TBS. During the mid-1980s, these TBS carriages were converted to day-night seating which altered the seating capacity to 48, these cars were then recoded TDS.

Four SBS carriages were converted to day-night cars (2245, 2252, 2255 & 2256) and recoded SDS.

During the early 1980s, 3 SBS cars (2241, 2248 & 2249) had their compartment section altered to a storeroom for the dining cars on the Gold Coast Motorail. This reduced the seating capacity to 42, with these cars recoded SBZ. These three cars were further rebuilt between 1987 and 1989 and had new toilets fitted at one end, with the other end being rebuilt into a large luggage area with a guard's compartment, these cars then had a seating capacity of 36 and were given the code SBH.

=== OFS, OBS, ODS & ODL Staff & Sitting Cars & RDS Buffet/Sitting Car ===
Four second class sitting cars coded OFS with a seating capacity of 41 with 2 and 2 seating and a staff and a hostess compartment were originally constructed & numbered 2257 to 2260. Four first class sitting cars were also constructed and coded OBS numbered 2261 to 2264 and had a seating capacity of 28 with 2 and 1 seating and a staff and a hostess compartment.

During the late 1970s, 2257, 2260, 2261 & 2263 were converted to day-night seating with a passenger capacity of 42. As part of this conversion the toilets at the men's end were removed & replaced by four small cubicles, two for each sex. The ladies toilet, staff & hostess compartments were removed to allow for the main saloon to be lengthened. A new staff compartment was installed in the remaining space. These converted cars were recoded ODS. Second class sitting car SFS 2267 was also converted to an ODS car as well during 1977.

In 1985, 2262 & 2264 were rebuilt with day-night seating with a capacity of 34 passengers and recoded ODL.

In 1989, ODS 2263 was rebuilt with a buffet & serving counter and a capacity of 30 passengers, being recoded RDS.

=== SFS & SFE Second Class Cars, SFR Second Class/Buffet Storage & SDS, BDS, NDS & SDZ Day-Nighter Cars ===
Twenty five second class cars numbered 2265 to 2289 were originally constructed and coded SFS, these cars had a seating capacity of 49 in the main saloon & 8 in a compartment.

In 1956, SFS 2267 & 2268 had their eight-seat compartment stripped and rebuilt for beverage storage and were recoded SFR. In 1960 these two cars had their storage compartments removed and their saloons lengthened, which gave them a capacity of 57 passengers in the main saloon, they were also recoded back to SFS. In 1963, the eight seat compartment of SFS 2279 & 2281 was altered and the cars were recoded SFR and had a capacity of 49 passengers. These cars were coupled next to the RS buffet cars on the Intercapital Daylight to give increased space for food preparation & take away snacks. In 1981, these 2 cars were taken out of service, with 2279 being converted to an SDS and 2281 was later condemned in 1983.

During the mid-1970s to early 1980s, 10 SFS cars were converted to day-night cars (Nos. 2271, 2272, 2273, 2276, 2278, 2280, 2284, 2287, 2288 & 2289). This conversion involved the removal of the 8 seat compartment which increased the seating capacity to 60, these cars were recoded SDS. In 1985 Nos.2287 and 2289 were converted by fitting of an interior partition to provide separate smoking & non-smoking sections, these 2 cars were recoded SDZ.

In 1985–86, five SFS cars (Nos. 2269, 2282, 2283, 2285 & 2286) were refurbished, as part of this refurbishment the old saloon seating and the compartment were removed and replaced by new day-night seating. The new seating arrangements had a capacity of 48 and these cars were recoded BDS. These 5 cars were refurbished again in 1988-89 with the removal of the toilets at one end and were fitted with additional day-night seating which then gave them a capacity of 64 passengers. These 5 cars were then recoded to NDS.

In 1988–89, SFS 2265 & 2274 were refurbished, this involved the stripping of the saloon & the toilets at one end, economy turnover seating was retained with a capacity of 72 passengers, these cars were recoded SFE.

=== RS & ABS Buffet Diner Cars ===
Eight buffet cars coded RS were originally constructed by Commonwealth Engineering and numbered 2299 to 2306. A ninth car numbered 1962 was constructed at Eveleigh Carriage Workshops in 1965. The interior design of these buffet cars was based on the buffet cars built by Victorian Railways in 1938-39. Instead of tables and chairs with a centre aisle, they were fitted with a long counter and 27 stools that ran the length of most of the car. Food preparation was mostly carried out behind the counter, along with a small kitchen at one end of the car.

In 1973, to handle the heavy bookings on the Intercapital Daylight, two of the RS cars (2299 & 2306) were rebuilt as ABS dining cars. These cars were fitted with fixed tables and loose 48 seats, the separate kitchen was also enlarged and rebuilt. Due to objections by the Victorian Railways these rebuilt cars were not used on their intended service but on the Gold Coast Motorail instead. During 1975-76 a further four were rebuilt as ABS type cars (2300, 2302, 2303 & 2305) to provide dining car service on the Brisbane Limited and North Coast Daylight Express. In 1985, RS 2304 was also rebuilt as an ABS car, but this car varied slightly by having low partitions separating the tables with fold down seats from these partitions. As the other ABS cars received workshop attention in the mid-1980s most also received this altered seating. In June 1989, RS 2301 was rebuilt as an 80-seat interurban car with no toilet to operate on the South Coast Daylight Express in company with 1100/1200 class carriages and recoded BKS.

=== PHS Power Vans ===
Nine cars provided the power for the air-conditioning, lighting and kitchen equipment. They were numbered 2290 to 2298 and coded PHS. They were fitted with an engine compartment that was originally fitted with two GM 6.71 75 kW (101 hp) diesel alternator units. A guard's compartment was fitted centrally with the other end was a luggage compartment for 5 tonnes (4.9 long tons; 5.5 short tons) of passengers' booked luggage.

During the 1960s, the GM diesels were replaced with higher powered Caterpillar D343 generator sets on cars 2293 to 2298. These new engines required the extension of the engine compartment, which then required the moving of the guard's compartment. This reduced the size of the luggage compartment, which was reduced to 3 tonnes capacity.

In 1982, PHS 2294 and 2296 were rebuilt with a toilet fitted in the luggage compartment area, the guard's compartment was fitted with air conditioning at the same time. The exterior sliding doors to the luggage compartment were relocated as well. These two cars were later further rebuilt with a shower and new toilet facilities in the luggage area.

In 1986, PHS 2296 was repowered with Cummins NT855 engines.

== Surviving RUB carriages ==
Number	Original code	Owner	Location	Notes
SBS 2240	SBS	Transport Heritage NSW	Broadmeadow Locomotive Depot	
TDS 2242	SBS	ARHS ACT Div	Canberra	
TDS 2243	SBS	Nullarbor Trains	Tailem Bend, SA	Currently Being Restored 2019
SDS 2245	SBS	Private owner - Barry Neville	Barry	Used as a cottage
TDS 2247	SBS	Chumrail Pty Ltd	Goulburn	Ex ARHS ACT Div
PSDS 2248	SBS	SCT Logistics	Operational	Converted to crew carriage by Gemco Rail, Forrestfield ex Northern Rivers Railroad
SBS 2250	TDS	Transport Heritage NSW	Broadmeadow Locomotive Depot	Stored operational
TDS 2251	SBS	ARHS ACT Div	Canberra	
SDS 2252	SBS	Hunter Valley Railway Trust	Rothbury	
SDS 2256	SBS	Hunter Valley Railway Trust	Rothbury	
ODS 2257	OFS	St Mary's Vietnam Veterans' Outpost	St Marys	
OFS 2259	OFS	Transport Heritage NSW	Carriageworks Redfern	
OAS 2261	OBS, ODS	Hunter Valley Railway Trust	Rothbury	Ex Ozback Explorer. Now a Side Corridor Sleeping Car.
ODL 2262	OBS	ARHS ACT Div	Canberra	Used for storage
RDS 2263	OBS	Unknown	Orange	
SFE 2265	SFS	Hunter Valley Railway Trust	Rothbury	
NDS 2268	SFS	Transport Heritage NSW	Broadmeadow Locomotive Depot	Stored non-operational
NDS 2269	SBS	Nullarbor Trains	Tailem Bend, SA	Currently Being Restored 2019
OSS 2271	SFS, SDS	Hunter Valley Railway Trust	Rothbury	Blue Zephyr, ex Ozback Explorer. Now a Bar/Lounge Car.
PSDS 2273	SFS	SCT Logistics	Operational	Converted to crew carriage by Gemco Rail, Forrestfield
SFE 2274	SFS	Unknown	Condobolin	Very poor condition
SDS 2276	SFS	Hunter Valley Railway Trust	Rothbury	
SFS 2277	SFS	ARHS ACT Div	Canberra	Very poor condition
SDS 2278	SDS	Hunter Valley Railway Trust	Rothbury	
PSDS 2279	SFS	SCT Logistics	Operational	Converted to crew carriage by Gemco Rail, Forrestfield
PSDS 2280	SFS	SCT Logistics	Operational	Converted to crew carriage by Gemco Rail, Forrestfield
NDS 2282	SFS, BDS	Transport Heritage NSW	Broadmeadow Locomotive Depot	Stored non-operational.
NDS 2283	SFS, BDS	Hunter Valley Railway Trust	Rothbury	Blue Zephyr.
NDS 2285	SFS, BDS	Transport Heritage NSW	Broadmeadow Locomotive Depot	Stored non-operational.
NDS 2286	SFS, BDS	Transport Heritage NSW	Broadmeadow Locomotive Depot	Stored non-operational.
PHS 2290	PHS	Boyd Munro	Goulburn Railway Workshops	
PHS 2294	PHS	V/Line	Newport Workshops	This carriage is Broad gauge.
PHS 2296	PHS	Eskbank Locomotive Depot & Museum	Eskbank	
PHS 2298	PHS	Hunter Valley Railway Trust	Rothbury	
ORS 2300	RS, ABS	Hunter Valley Railway Trust	Rothbury	Blue Zephyr, ex Ozback Explorer.
ABS 2301	RS	Unknown	Moree	In very poor condition
ABS 2304	RS	Lachlan Valley Railway	Eveleigh	In excellent original condition.
ABS 2305	RS	Transport Heritage NSW	Thirlmere	
RS 1962	RS	Transport Heritage NSW	Thirlmere	Not operational

== Gallery ==
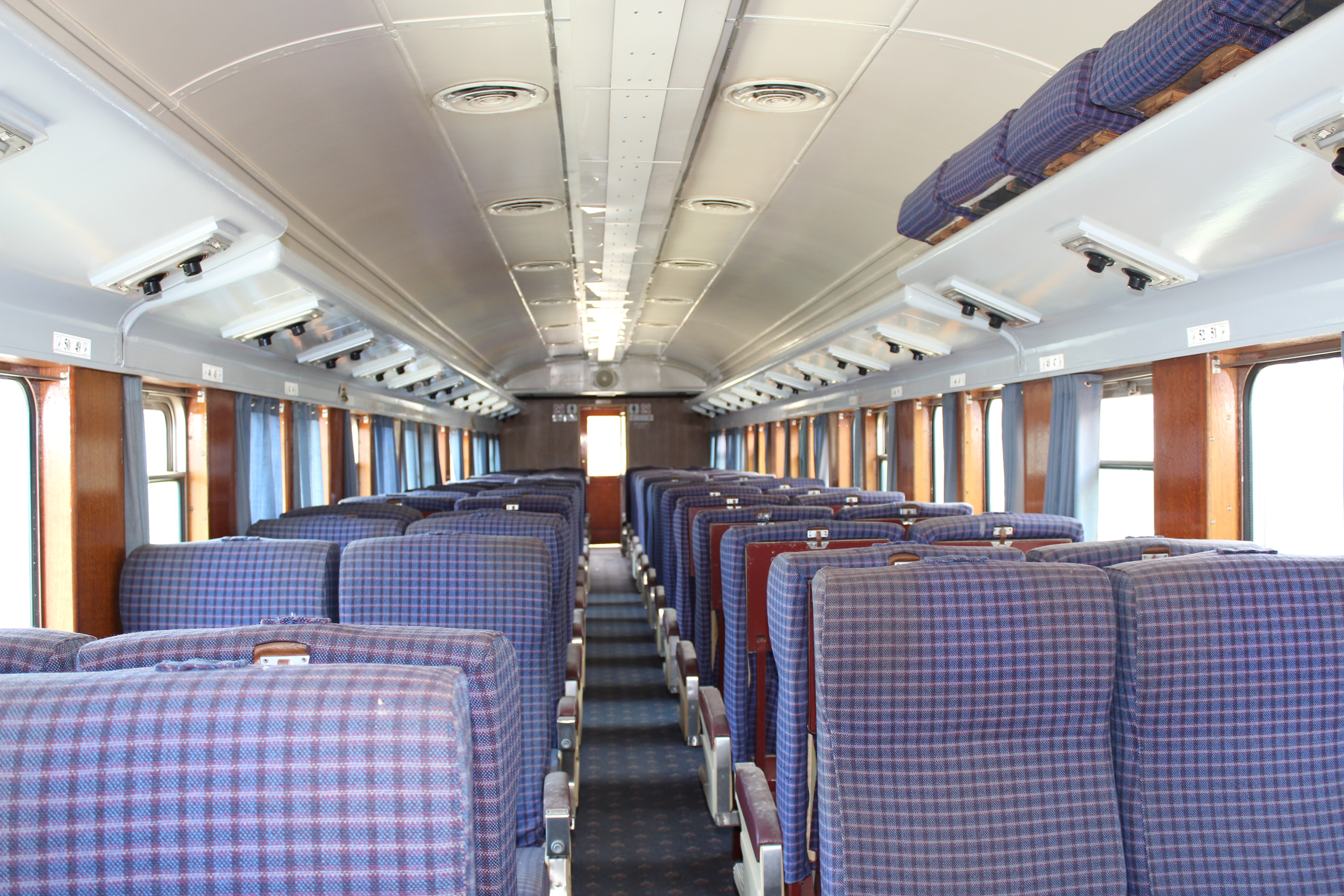
Interior of NDS 2268 stored at Broadmeadow Locomotive Depot in December 2012

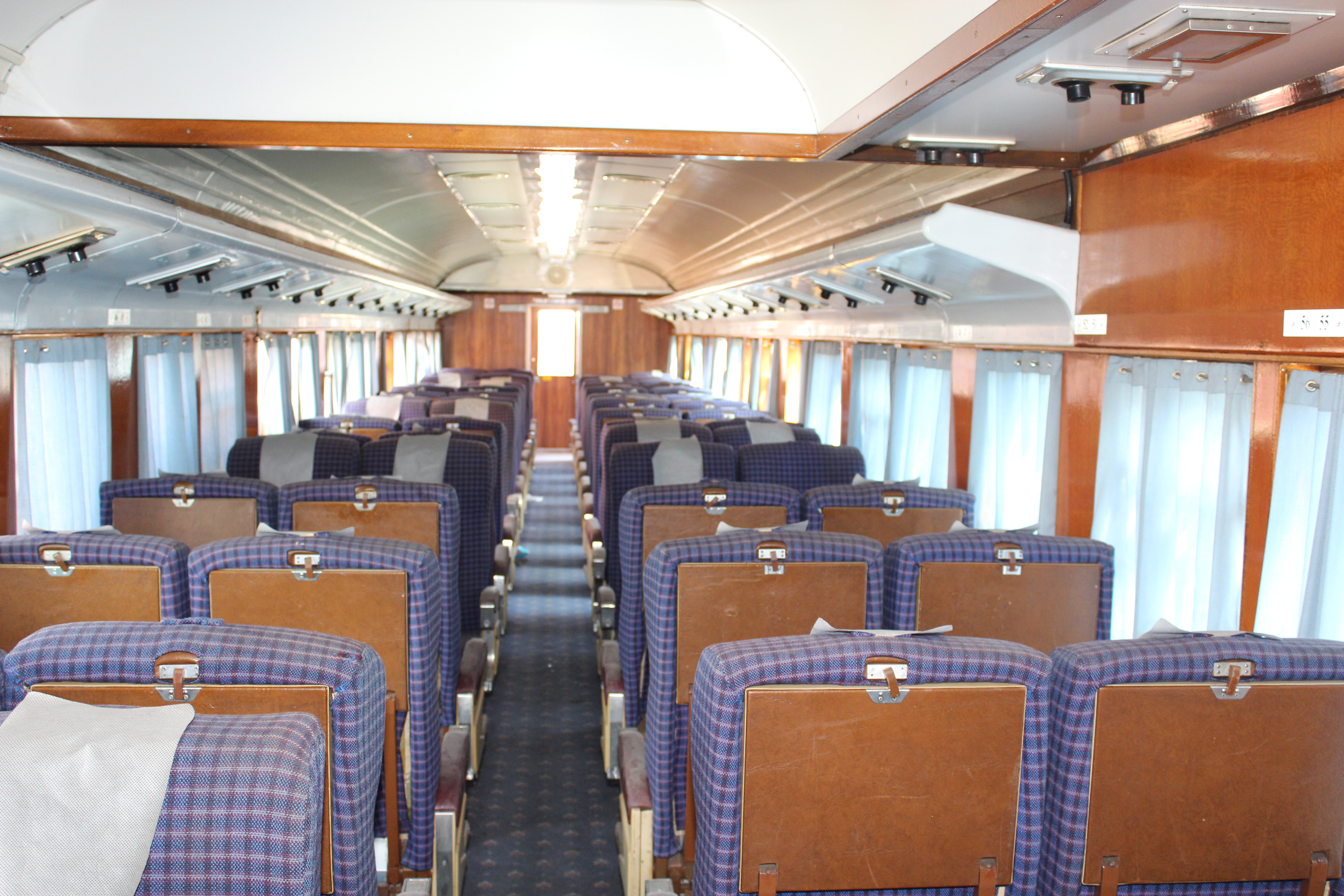
Interior of NDS 2285 stored at Broadmeadow Locomotive Depot in December 2012

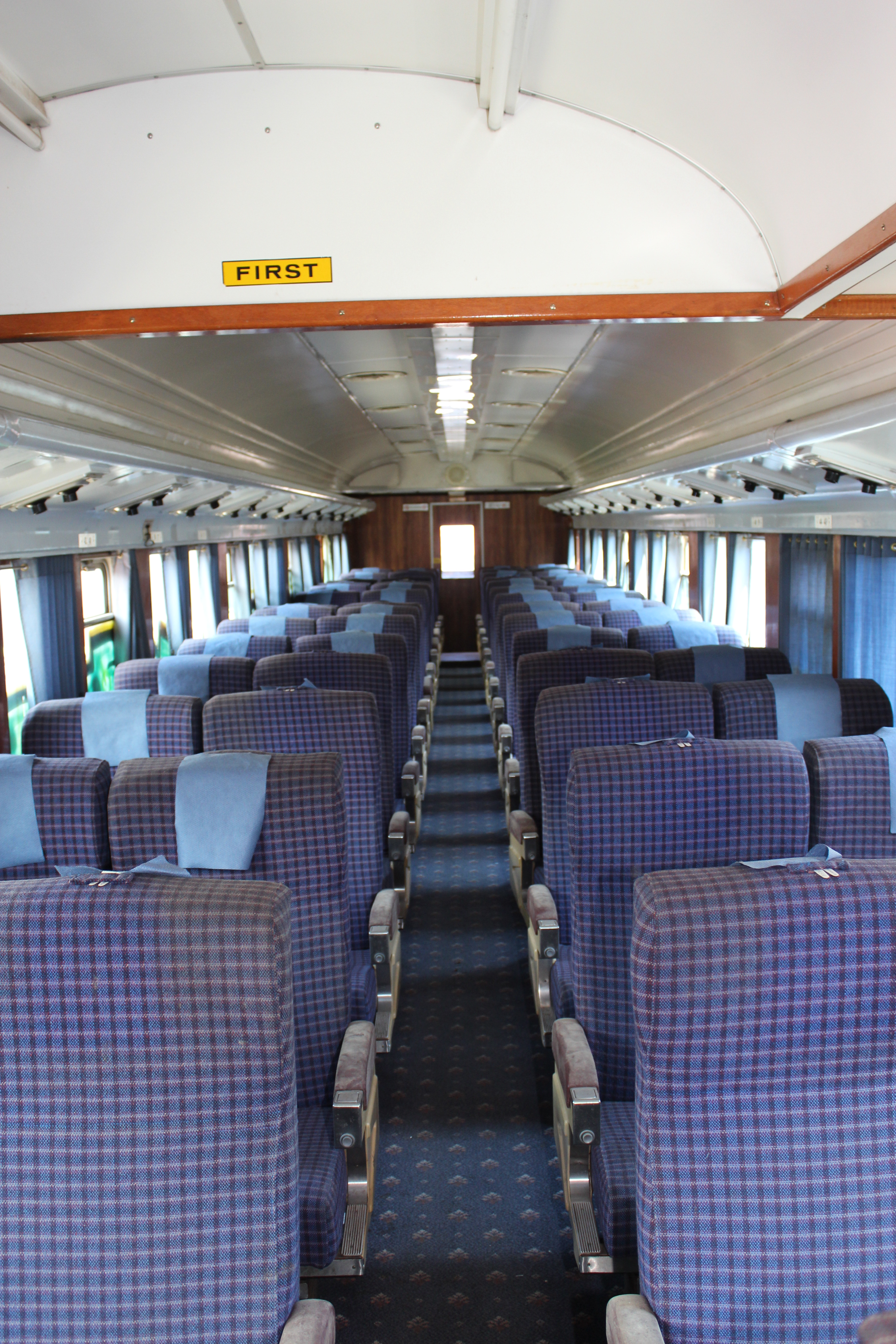
Interior of NDS 2286 at Broadmeadow Locomotive Depot in December 2012

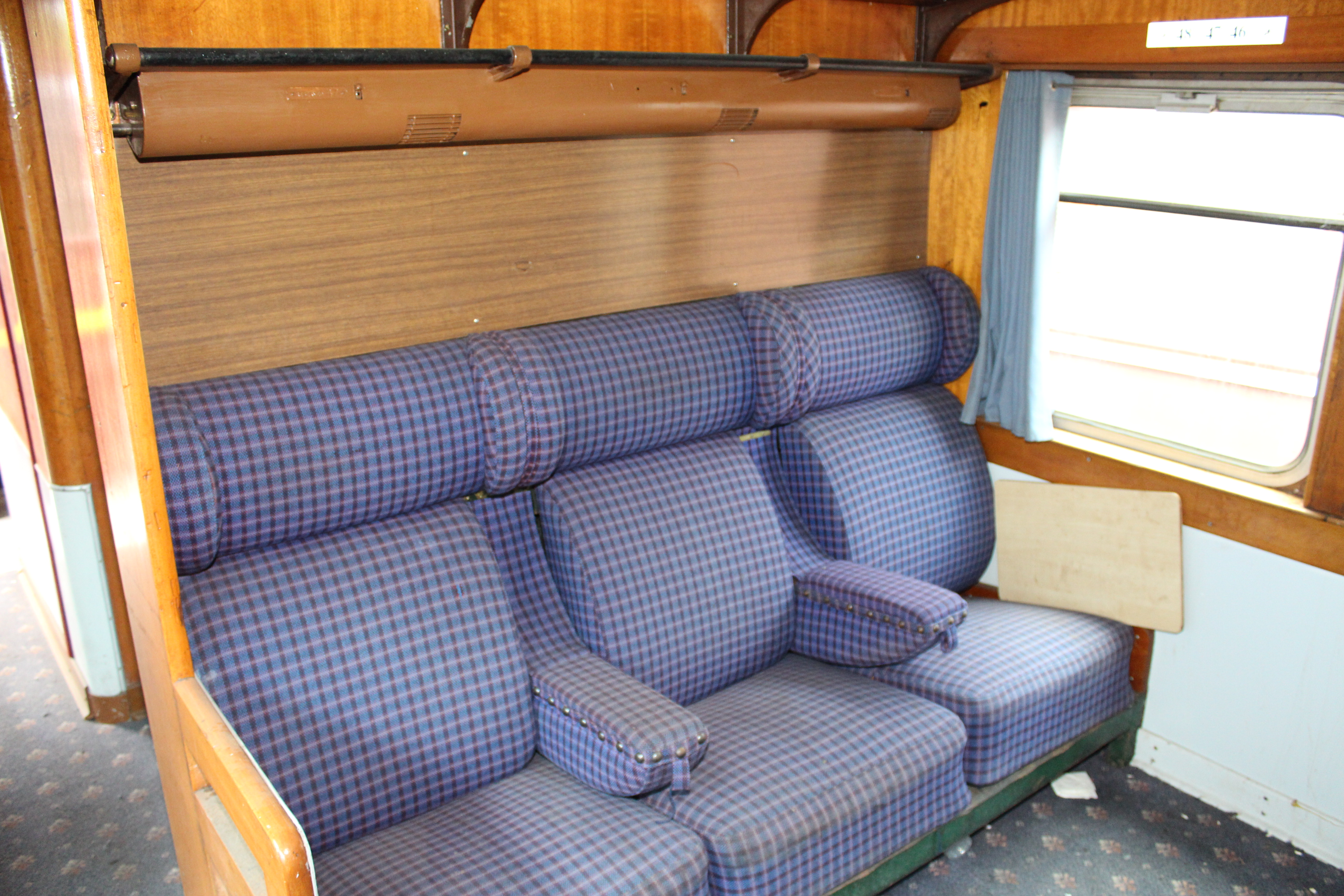
Compartment of TDS 2250 at Broadmeadow Locomotive Depot in December 2012

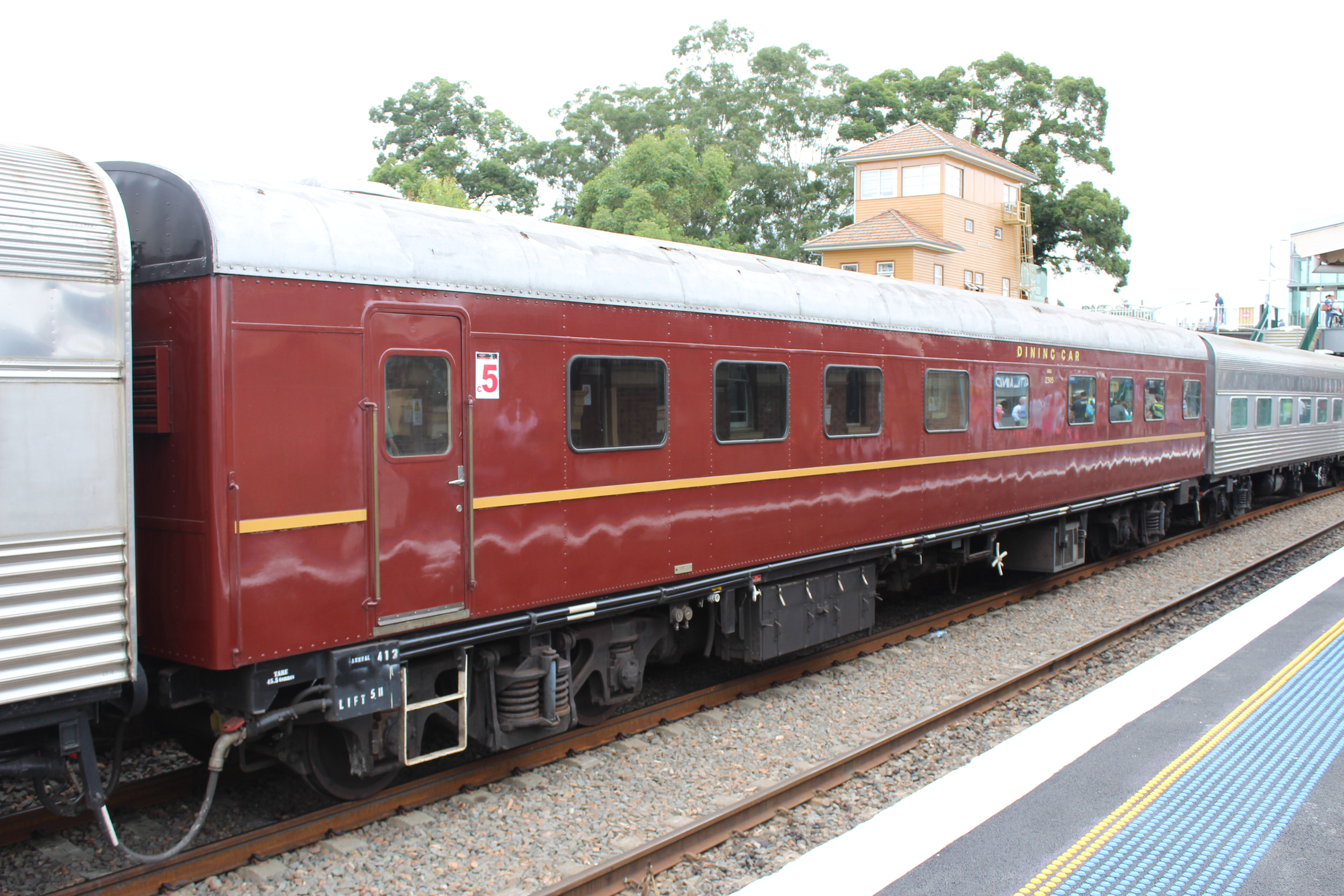
ABS 2305 at Maitland in April 2014
