= New South Wales 42 class locomotive =

Class of Australian diesel-electric locomotives

New South Wales 42 class
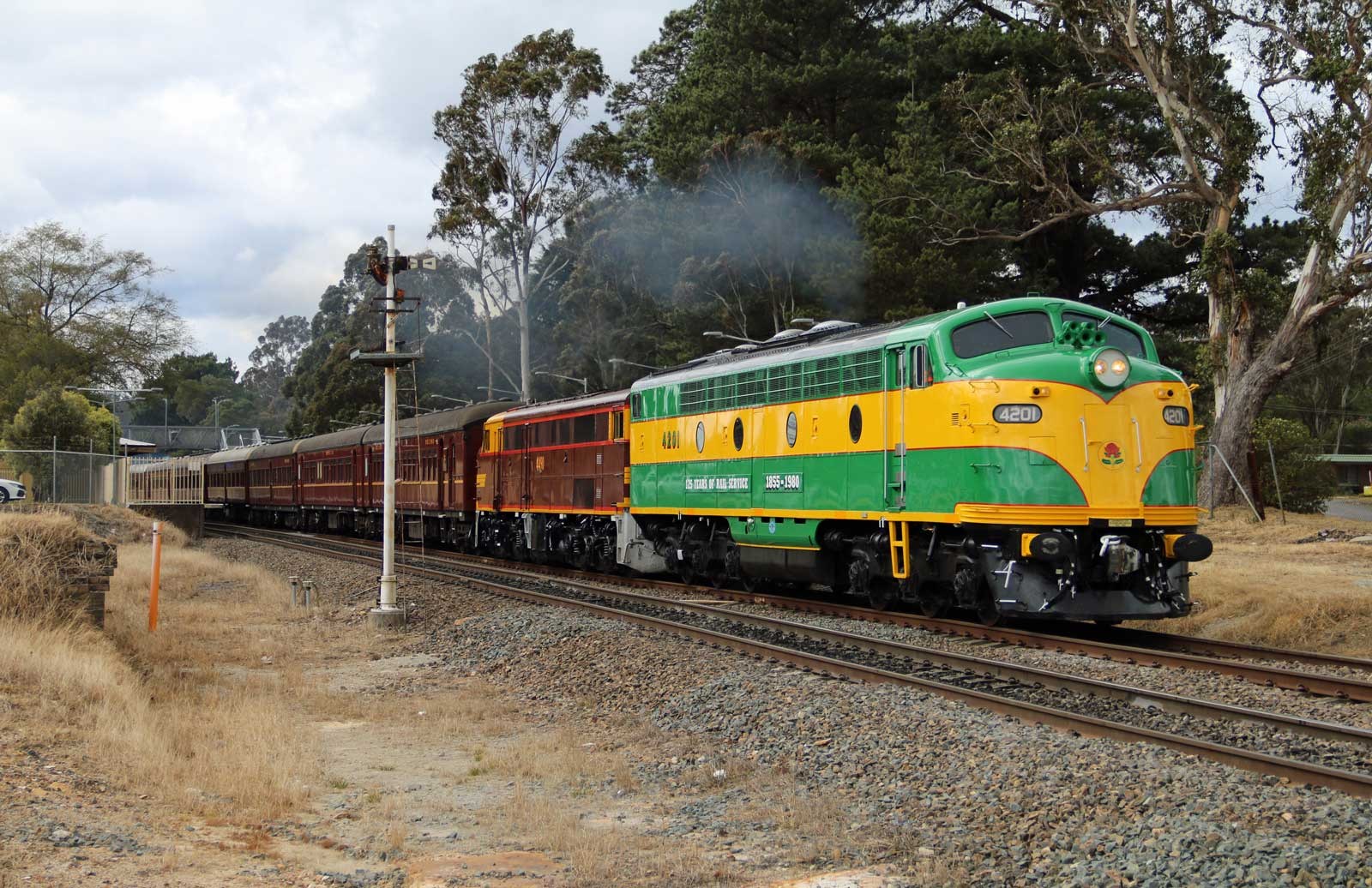
- 4201 leading a NSW Rail Museum train at Mittagong in September 2017
Type and origin
- Power type: Diesel-electric
- Builder: Clyde Engineering, Granville
- Serial number: 55-74, 55-75, 55-79, 56-87, 56-92, 56-100
- Model: EMD A7 (later A16C)
- Build date: 1955–1956
- Total produced: 6
Specifications
- Configuration
  - UIC: Co-Co
- Gauge: 1,435 mm (4 ft 8 1/2 in) standard gauge
- Wheel diameter: 40 in (1,016 mm)
- Length: Over headstocks: 58 ft 0 in (17.68 m), Over coupler pulling faces: 62 ft 3 1/4 in (18.98 m)
- Width: 9 ft 9 in (2.97 m)
- Height: 14 ft 0 in (4.27 m)
- Axle load: 20 long tons 0 cwt (44,800 lb or 20.3 t)
- Loco weight: 120 long tons 0 cwt (268,800 lb or 121.9 t)
- Fuel type: Diesel
- Fuel capacity: 1,500 imp gal (6,800 L; 1,800 US gal)
- Lubricant cap.: 165 imp gal (750 L; 198 US gal)
- Coolant cap.: 175 imp gal (800 L; 210 US gal)
- Sandbox cap.: 16 cu ft (0.45 m^{3})
- Prime mover: EMD 16-567C
- RPM range: 275–835
- Engine type: V16 Two-stroke diesel
- Aspiration: Roots blower
- Generator: EMD D12
- Traction motors: 6 x EMD D37
- Cylinders: 16
- Cylinder size: 8.5 in × 10 in (216 mm × 254 mm)
Performance figures
- Maximum speed: 71 mph (114 km/h)
- Power output: Gross: 1,800 hp (1,342 kW), For traction: 1,800 hp (1,342 kW)
- Tractive effort: Continuous: 61,250 lbf (272.45 kN) at 9 mph (14 km/h)
Career
- Operators: NSW Department of Railways
- Numbers: 4201–4206
- First run: 28 November 1955
- Withdrawn: 1983
- Preserved: 4201, 4203, 4204, 4206
- Current owner: Transport Heritage NSW, Lachlan Valley Railway, Dorrigo Steam Railway & Museum
- Disposition: 3 preserved, 3 scrapped

The New South Wales 42 class is a class of diesel locomotives built by Clyde Engineering, Granville for the New South Wales Department of Railways in 1955/56.

== History ==
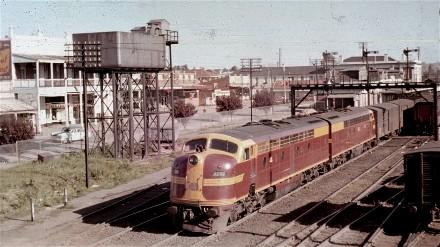
4202 and 4206 depart Junee with a northbound freight train

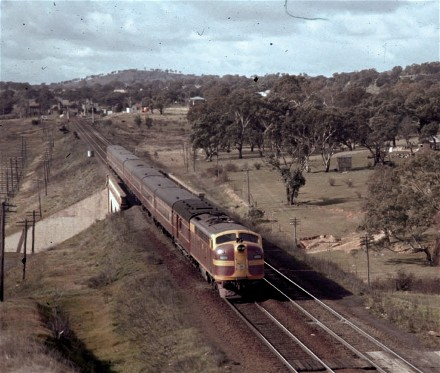
4202 operating wrong road at Yass hauling the Intercapital Daylight

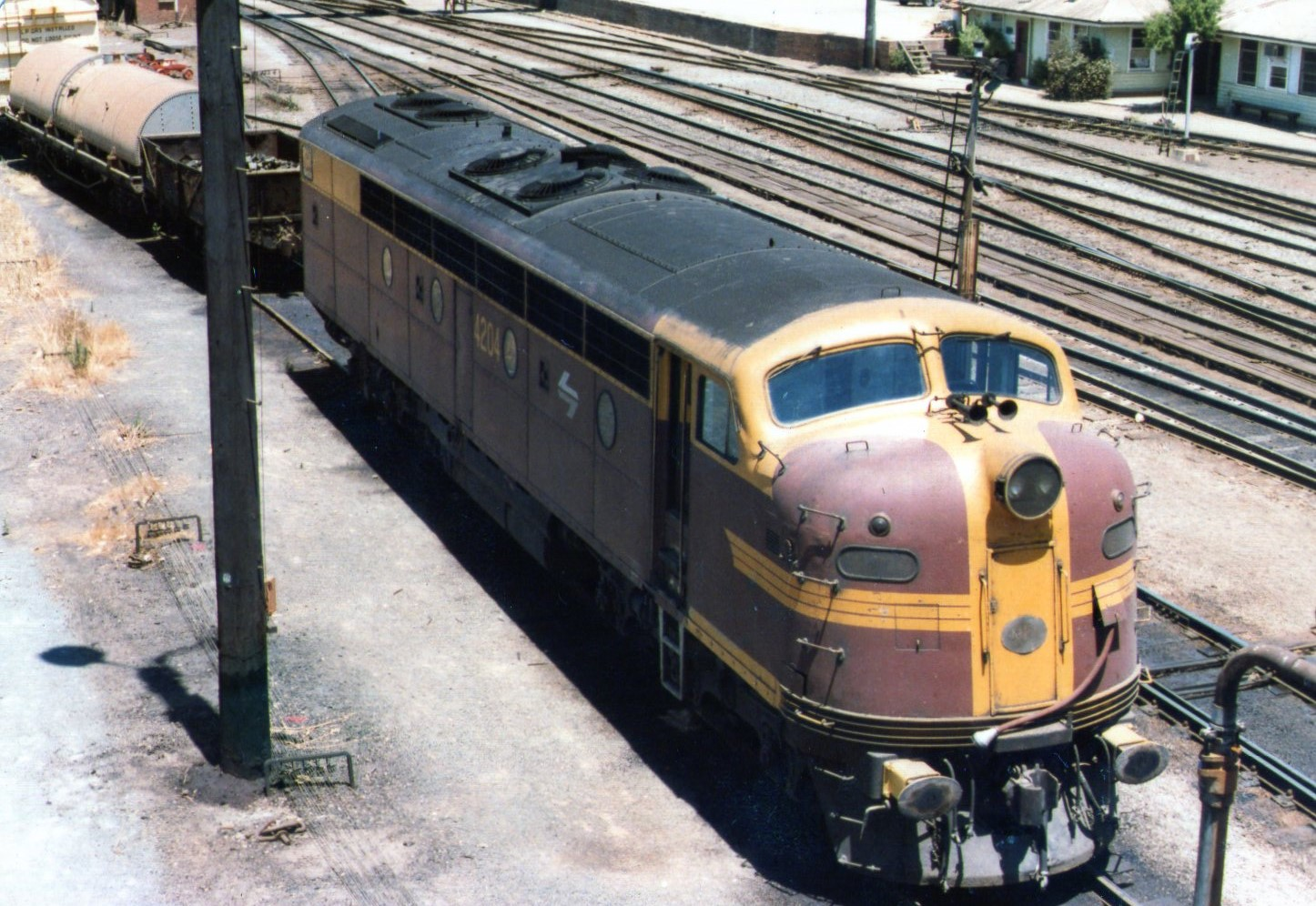
4204 at Albury in 1977

The design is based on the Electro-Motive Diesel EMD F9 locomotive, and is very similar to the GM 12 class then being built by Clyde Engineering for the Commonwealth Railways.

The locos initially worked express passenger services including the Brisbane Limited, Intercapital Daylight and Melbourne Limited and later the Southern Aurora and Spirit of Progress. As newer locomotives arrived they were concentrated on the Main South line operating freight services.

By April 1978, the Goulburn branch of the Australian Federated Union of Locomotive Enginemen had placed a ban on operating the 42 class as lead engines due to cab conditions. In 1980, to overcome those problems, 4201 had its cab upgraded during an overhaul but, with their replacement imminent, it was decided not to modify the rest of the class. All were withdrawn in 1983.

== Preservation ==
Three have been preserved. A fourth was preserved, but this has since been mostly cut up:

- 4201 was acquired by the NSW Rail Museum. It has been used extensively on charters across the state and ventured interstate to Melbourne. It retains the green and yellow livery it received for the 125th anniversary of NSW railways in 1980.
- 4203 was acquired by Caravan City Cowra and placed on display alongside the Mid-Western Highway at the entrance to the War, Rail, and Rural Museum. It was later sold and the body was cut into three sections; while the central section was scrapped, O'Donoghue's Pub in Emu Plains bought the cab and rearmost section of the body and welded them together for use as playground equipment. The bogies and fuel tank were sold to enthusiast groups for use as spare parts. As of 2021, however, the remains of 4203 are now no longer at O'Donoghue's, being believed to have been scrapped.
- 4204 was acquired by the Lachlan Valley Railway, After being restored by apprentices at Clyde Engineering, Kelso in 1986, it has been used extensively on charters across the state and on freight services by Lachlan Valley Rail Freight. In the late 1990s, it was limited to operations pending overhaul at Lachlan Valley Railway's Cowra Rail Heritage Centro. It returned to service in early 2010 following overhaul and outshopped back into its original Special Maroon livery. Until December 2018, it was used regularly on mainline tour trains and often hired to Southern Shorthaul Railroad for use on infrastructure trains in New South Wales and Victoria. In October 2019, 4204 returned to service to run a charter train to Capertee from Lithgow after being away for overhaul and repainting.
- 4206 was purchased by Dorrigo Steam Railway & Museum. After being used extensively on the Dorrigo line hauling 40 trains from Glenreagh to Dorrigo in the 1980s, it is currently stored, it was in operational condition but open storage has taken its toll.

Locomotive	Serial No	Entered service	Current Owner	Livery	Status
4201	55-74	Nov 1955	NSW Rail Museum	125 Years of NSW Railways Green & Yellow	Preserved, Operational
4202	55-75	Dec 1955	-	-	Scrapped
4203	55-79	Jan 1956	O'Donohugue's Pub, Emu Plains	Red & Black	Converted (Cut-Down Shell)
4204	56-87	Mar 1956	Lachlan Valley Railway	Indian Red	Preserved, Operational
4205	56-92	May 1956	-	-	Scrapped
4206	56-100	Aug 1956	Dorrigo Steam Railway & Museum	Indian Red	Stored
