= Northern Mail =

Former railway service in New South Wales, Australia

Overview
- Service type: Passenger train
- Status: Ceased
- Last service: 27 November 1988
- Former operator: State Rail Authority

Route
- Termini: Sydney; Tenterfield; Moree
- Distance travelled: 774 kilometres (481 mi) (Tenterfield); 666 kilometres (414 mi) (Moree)
- Service frequency: Once daily in each direction
- Train numbers: NL7 and NL8
- Lines used: Main North; Mungindi

The Northern Mail was an Australian passenger train that ran from Sydney to Armidale, Glen Innes, Tenterfield and Moree from the 1870s until November 1988.

The service ran overnight from Sydney via the Main North line to Werris Creek where the train divided. One portion continued to Moree while the other continued until Armidale. This latter service continued to Glen Innes and Tenterfield on certain nights.

From January 1960, the Sydney to Gosford portion of the trip was hauled by 46 class electric locomotives and from June 1984 this was extended to Broadmeadow following electrification.

The Northern Mail ceased operating in November 1988.
