= Northern Tablelands Express =

Australian passenger train service

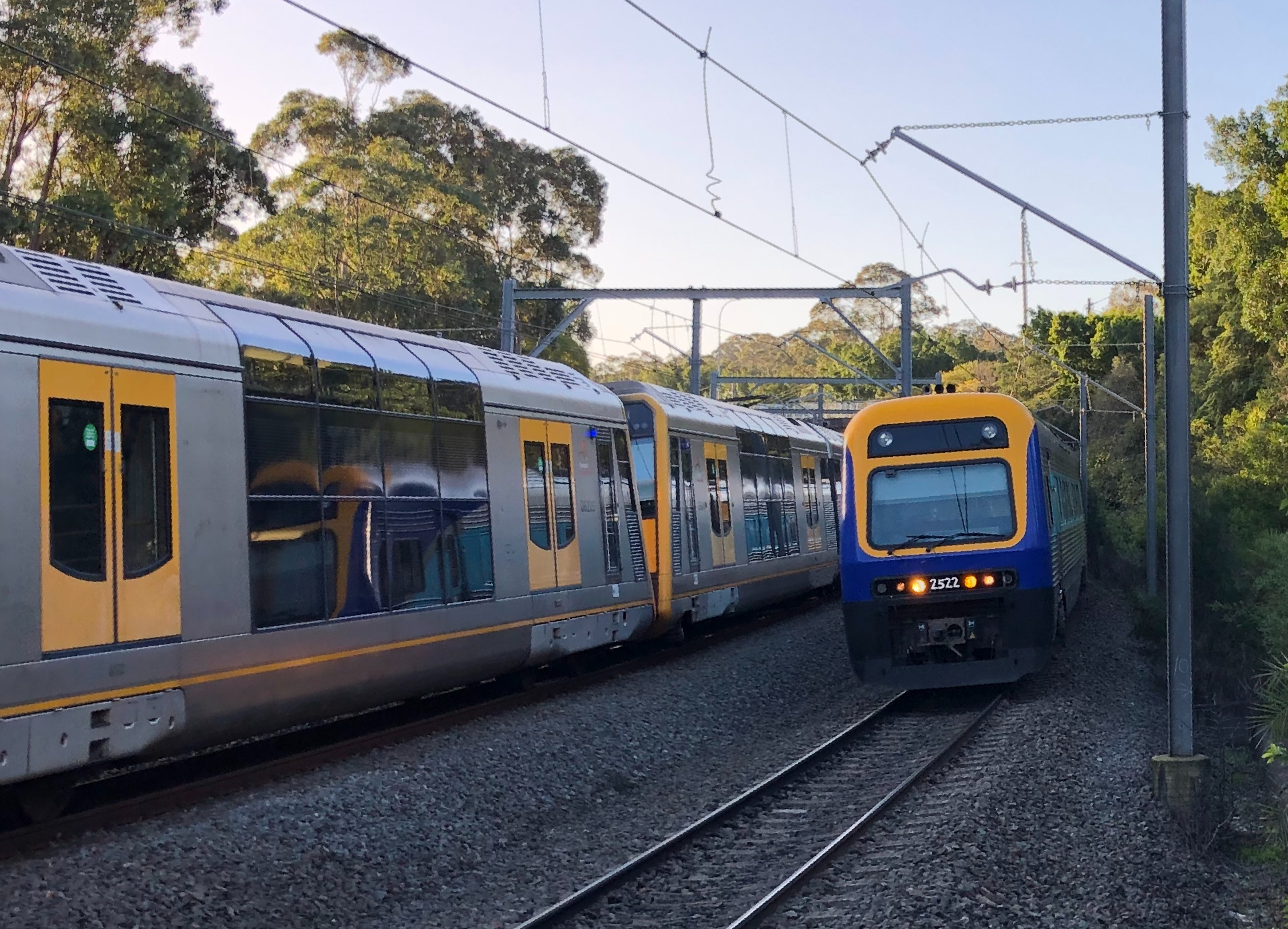
- Northern Tablelands-bound Xplorer heading north through Sydney, 2020

Overview
- Service type: Passenger train
- Status: Operational
- First service: June 1941
- Current operator: NSW TrainLink

Route
- Termini: Sydney; Armidale; Moree
- Distance travelled: 579 kilometres (360 mi) (Armidale); 666 kilometres (414 mi) (Moree)
- Service frequency: Daily in each direction
- Lines used: Main North; Mungindi

Technical
- Rolling stock: Xplorer

The Northern Tablelands Express is the passenger train service in Australia between Sydney and Armidale or Moree, operated by the New South Wales Government Railways and its successors since June 1941.

== History ==
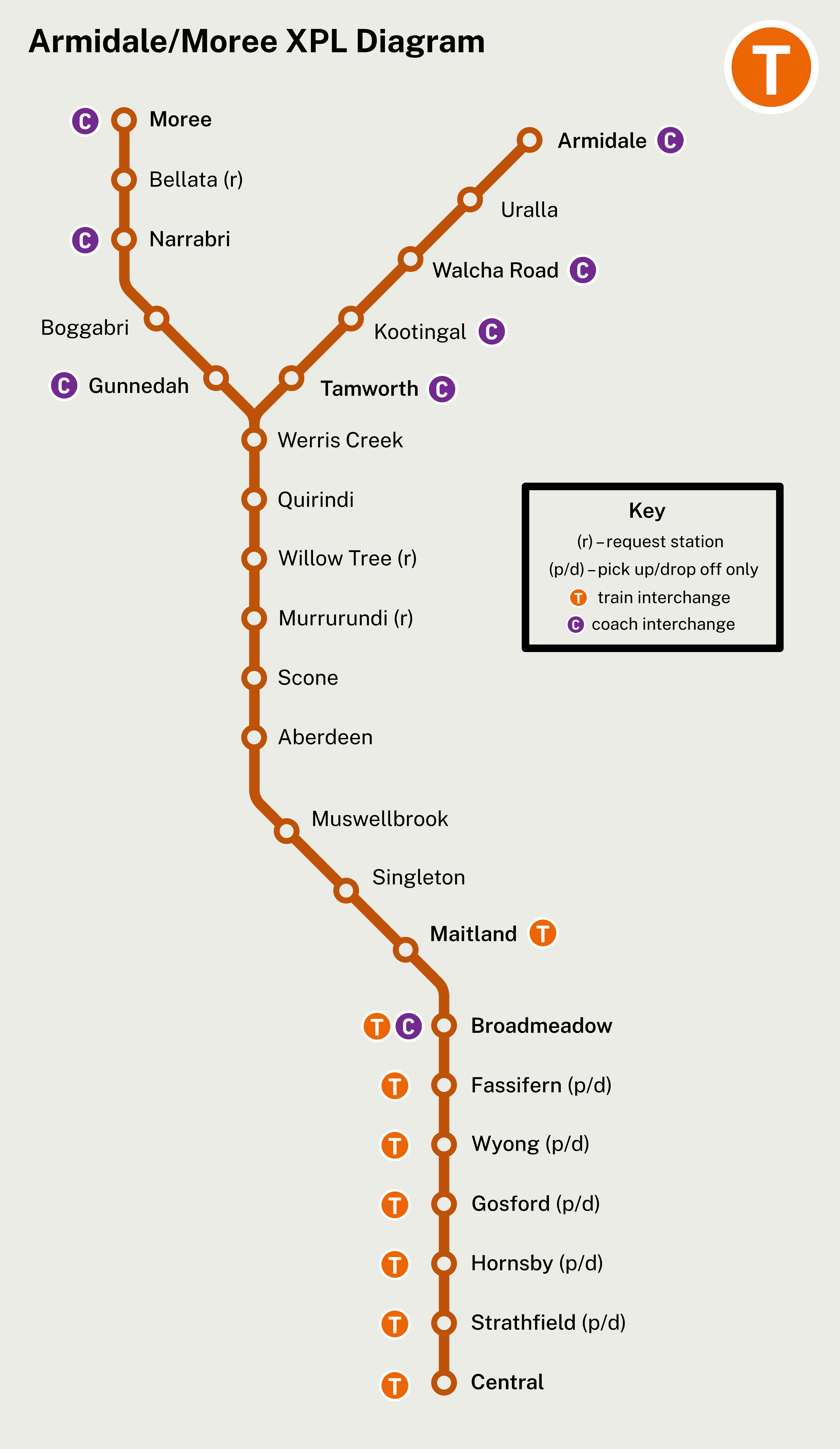
Route diagram of the Northern Tablelands Express.

The Northern Tablelands Express has operated from Sydney via the Main Northern line to various destinations in the New England district. It first ran in June 1941 between Sydney and Armidale, composed of R type carriages that were replaced by air conditioned RUB carriage stock in April 1951. It was usually hauled by a 35 class steam locomotive. In June 1959 it was converted to DEB set railcar operation dividing at Werris Creek with one portion for Glen Innes or Tenterfield and the other for Moree.

In June 1984, the service was taken over by XPTs and renamed the Northern Tablelands XPT with a DEB set connection between Werris Creek and Moree. In October 1985, the service was truncated to Armidale with an XPT operating the service three days per week and a locomotive hauled HUB/RUB set on the other three days.

In February 1990, the service was further truncated to become a day return XPT service to Tamworth. In 1993, the service was replaced with Xplorer railcars, initially still to Tamworth on a day return but, upon delivery of sufficient rolling stock, direct services were provided to Armidale and Moree, that once again divided at Werris Creek and this is how the train continues in service today.
