= North Coast Daylight Express =

Former Australian passenger train service

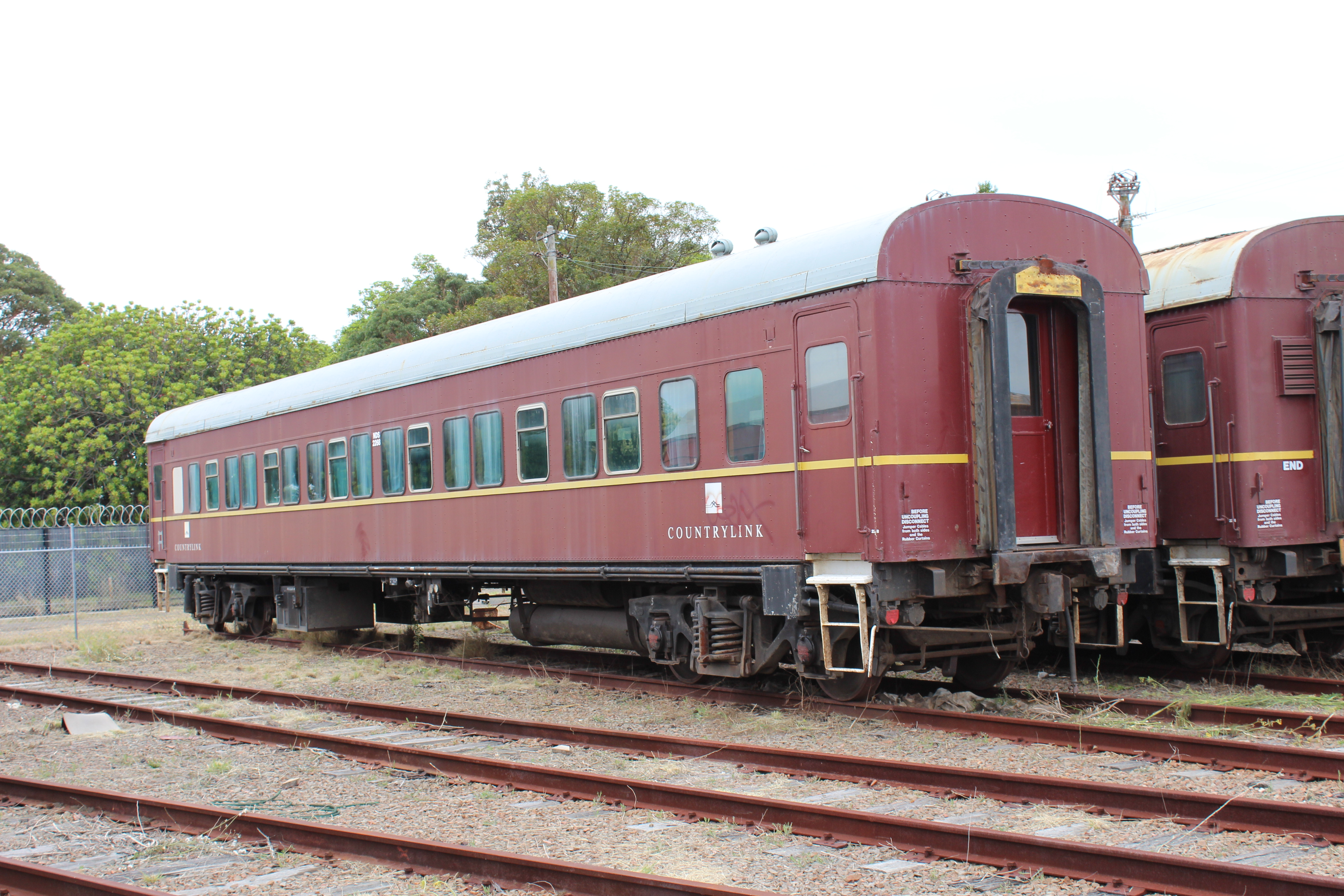
- RUB carriage at Broadmeadow Locomotive Depot in December 2012

Overview
- Service type: Passenger train
- Status: Ceased
- First service: November 1951
- Last service: February 1990
- Former operator: State Rail Authority

Route
- Termini: Sydney; Grafton
- Distance travelled: 696 kilometres
- Service frequency: Daily in each direction
- Line used: North Coast

The North Coast Daylight Express was an Australian passenger train service operated by the New South Wales Government Railways from November 1951 until February 1990.

It operated from Sydney via the North Coast line to Grafton. It commenced operating in November 1951 formed out a four-car DEB set. However mechanical issues with the set saw it replaced by locomotive hauled RUB set from May 1952.

In July 1974, it was briefly truncated to Taree but overcrowding on the connecting 620/720 railcar saw it restored to Grafton in November 1974.

In October 1985, the North Coast Daylight Express was converted to XPT operation and renamed the Holiday Coast XPT. It ceased operating in February 1990.
