= New South Wales HUB type carriage stock =

Type of train formerly used in Australia

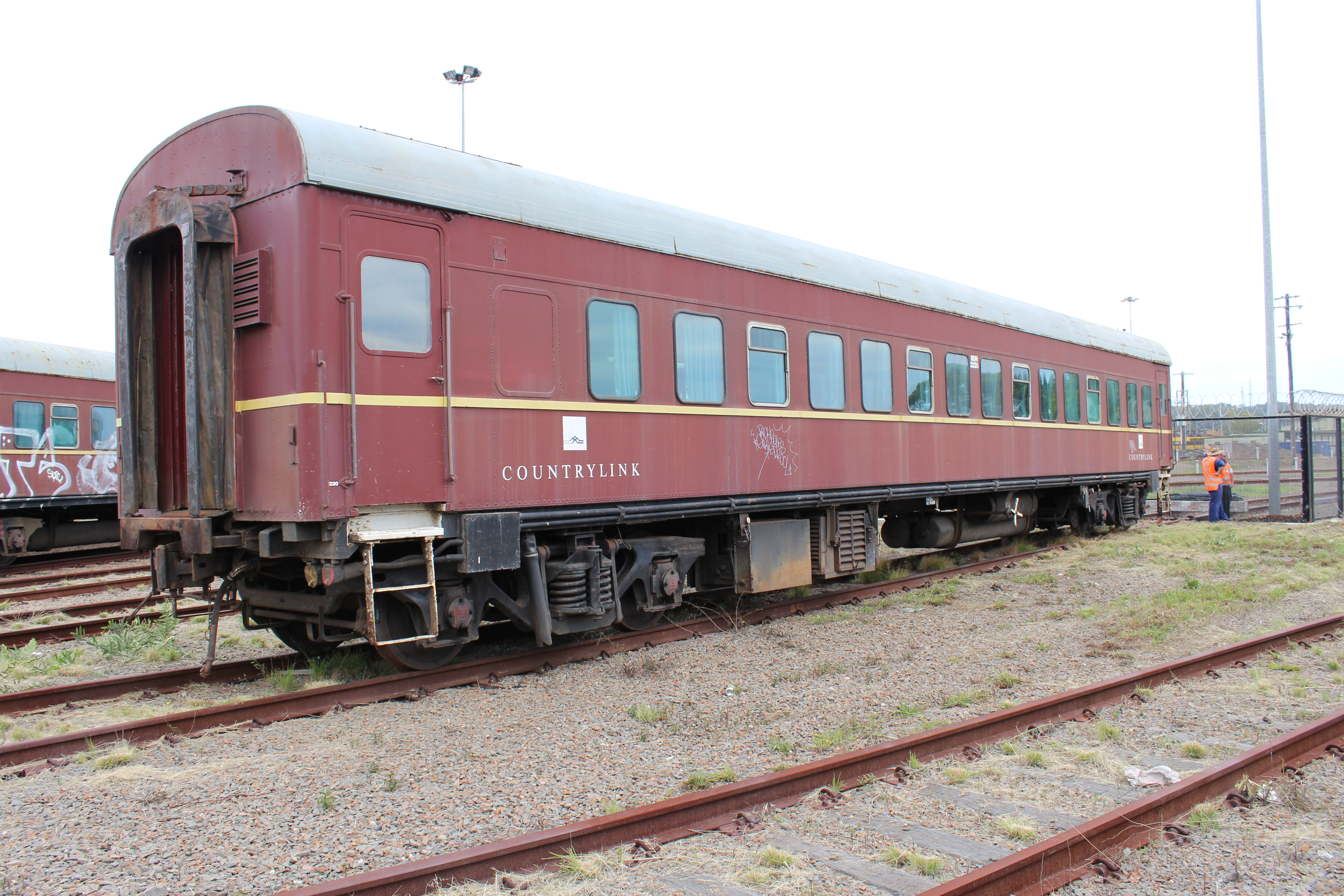
RDH 2220 at Broadmeadow Locomotive Depot in December 2012

The HUB type carriage stock is a type of air conditioned passenger carriage operated by the New South Wales Government Railways from April 1948 until April 2000.

== Design and development ==
The HUB set cars were ordered by the Department of Railways New South Wales in August 1943 for services between Sydney and Newcastle. Contract 3/43 let to Tulloch Limited, Rhodes for an additional 25 N type carriages, consisting of:

- eight BN 1st class cars
- nine FN 2nd class cars
- eight HFN 2nd class terminal cars

The cars were to receive numbers 2212-2219 (BN), 2220-2228 (FN), and 2229-2236 (HFN) and be formed into sets 115-118. While the overall dimensions and layout of the cars remained the same, several changes were planned, including replacing the frameless droplights and crownlights with traditional timber-framed units, and the lazy-tongs droplight mechanism replaced with a more conventional counter-balanced sash system. The forced ventilation system was also to be discontinued and the cars would have conventional rooftop ventilators.

By June 1945, the contract had been increased to 27 cars and would now be air-conditioned, to be known as "H" type cars. The new order was made up of:

- eight HFH 2nd class cars
- eight BH 1st class cars
- seven FH 2nd class cars
- four RBH 1st class buffet cars

Work on construction had begun by June 1945, however due to wartime shortages construction was delayed. By June 1946, the contract was further amended to 28 carriages and now included terminal cars with generator sets and 2nd class buffet cars. The cars were allocated numbers 2212 to 2239 and formed into four seven-car sets designated as HUB sets and numbered 116-119. The cars consisted of:

- four HFH 2nd class terminal cars
- four PFH 2nd class terminal cars with generating sets
- eight BH 1st class cars
- four FH 2nd class cars
- four RFH 2nd class buffet cars
- four RBH 1st class buffet cars

The sets were formed as follows:

Set	HFH	RFH	BH	BH	RBH	FH	PFH
116	2212	2232	2220	2221	2236	2228	2216
117	2213	2233	2222	2223	2237	2229	2217
118	2214	2234	2224	2225	2238	2230	2218
119	2215	2235	2226	2227	2239	2231	2219

== Service life ==
The first set entered service in April 1948 on the Newcastle Flyer. One briefly operated the Riverina Express before being transferred to the South Coast Daylight Express and them in 1956 to the Central West Express to Orange.

From the 1970s, the HUB sets ceased operating as fixed formations and the carriages were operated with RUB and stainless steel rolling stock on services throughout the state.

They ceased operating the Newcastle Flyer services in April 1988 and many were withdrawn as a number of locomotive hauled services ceased in the early 1990s. Some remained in service with CityRail on Southern Highlands services to Goulburn until replaced by Endeavour railcars in 1994.

Most were auctioned in August 1994 with the State Rail Authority retaining five. In 1996 three were returned to traffic for use on CountryLink's new services to Broken Hill and Griffith before being withdrawn in April 2000.

== Fleet status ==
HUB Delivery Set	Car No.	Original Code	Later codes	1st sale	2nd sale	3rd sale	4th sale	5th sa
116	Original Number	2212	2232	2220	2221	2236	2228	2216
116	Current/last code/number		RDH	RDH, Previous BHA, BHZ		RDH		FFH
116	Owner/Custodian	Private	NSW SRA	THNSW	DSR&M	ARHS ACT	Private	Lithgow State Mine
116	Location	Mullion Creek	Coopernook	Eveleigh	Dorrigo	Canberra	Eaglehawk	Lithgow
116	Condition	Body	Burnt Out/Scrapped 05/1983	Stored	Exhibit	Burnt Out/Scrapped 2012	Accommodation	Stored
117	Original Number	2213	2233	2222	2223	2237	2229	2217
117	Current/last code/number	HFZ	RDH	BHA	OHS Previous BHA	OAH, Previous RDH		FHH
117	Owner/Custodian	Private	THNSW	Private	Blue Zephyr	Blue Zephyr	NSW SRA	Private
117	Location	Lighting Ridge	Eveleigh	Gap	Rothbury	Rothbury	Simsmetal Mascot	Werris Creek
117	Condition	Body	Stored	Body	operational	Operational - Sleeper	Scrapped 08/1987	Stored
118	Original Number	2214	2234	2224	2225	2238	2230	2218
118	Current/last code/number	HFZ		BHZ		RDH		FHH
118	Owner/Custodian	Private		THNSW		Private	THNSW	THNSW
118	Location	Kundle Kundle		Broadmeadow	Menindee		Broadmeadow	Eveleigh
118	Condition	Cottage		Stored	Restaurant		Stored	Stored
119	Original Number	2215	2235	2226	2227	2239	2231	2219
119	Current/last code/number		RDH	BDS		RDH		PFZ
119	Owner/Custodian	Simsmetal	Mens Shed					THNSW
119	Location		Grenfell	Canberra		Rothbury	Marrangaroo	Thirlmere
119	Condition	Scrapped 08/1994	Club Room	Stored		Stored	Restaurant	Operational

== Gallery ==
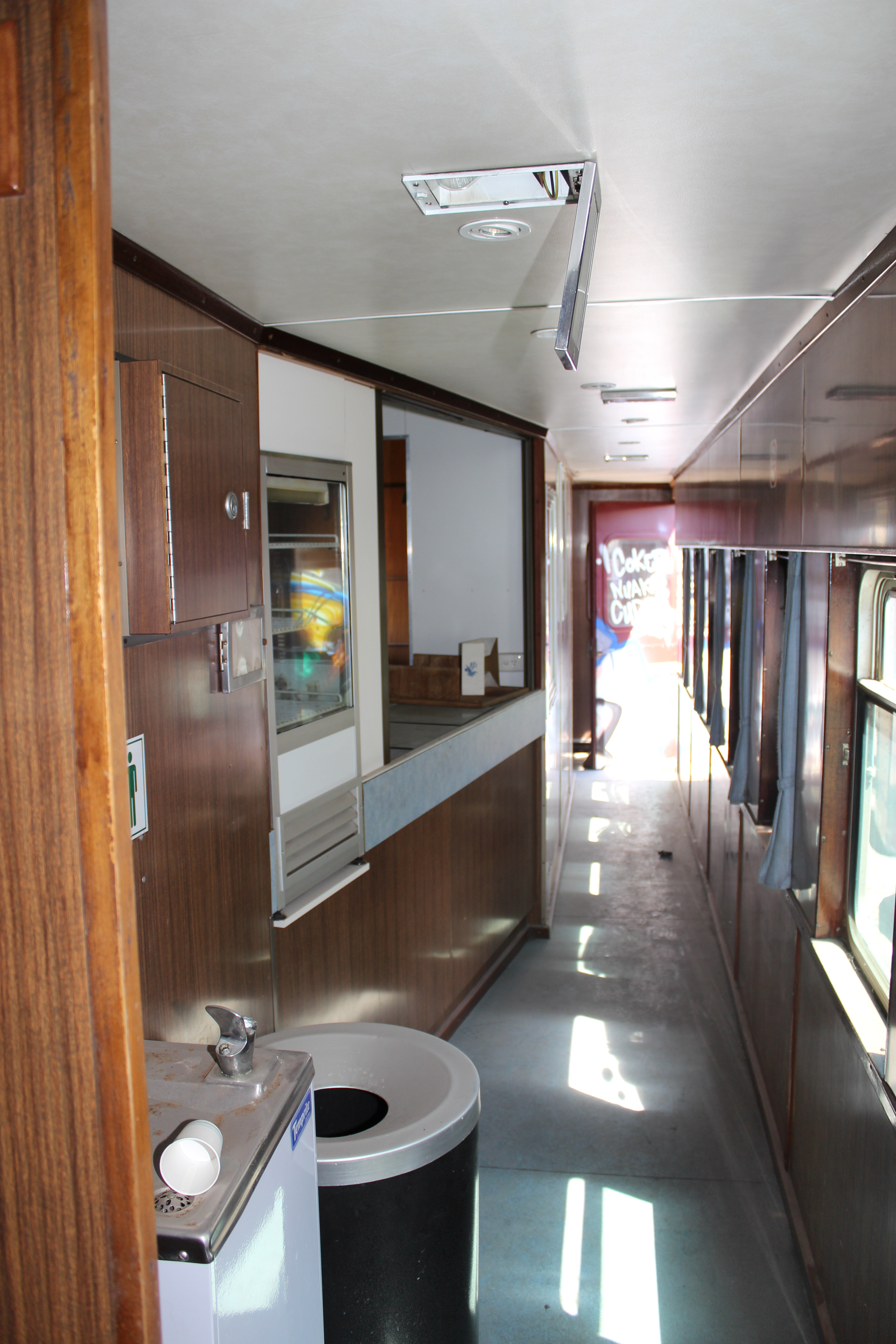
Buffet area of RDH 2233 in December 2012

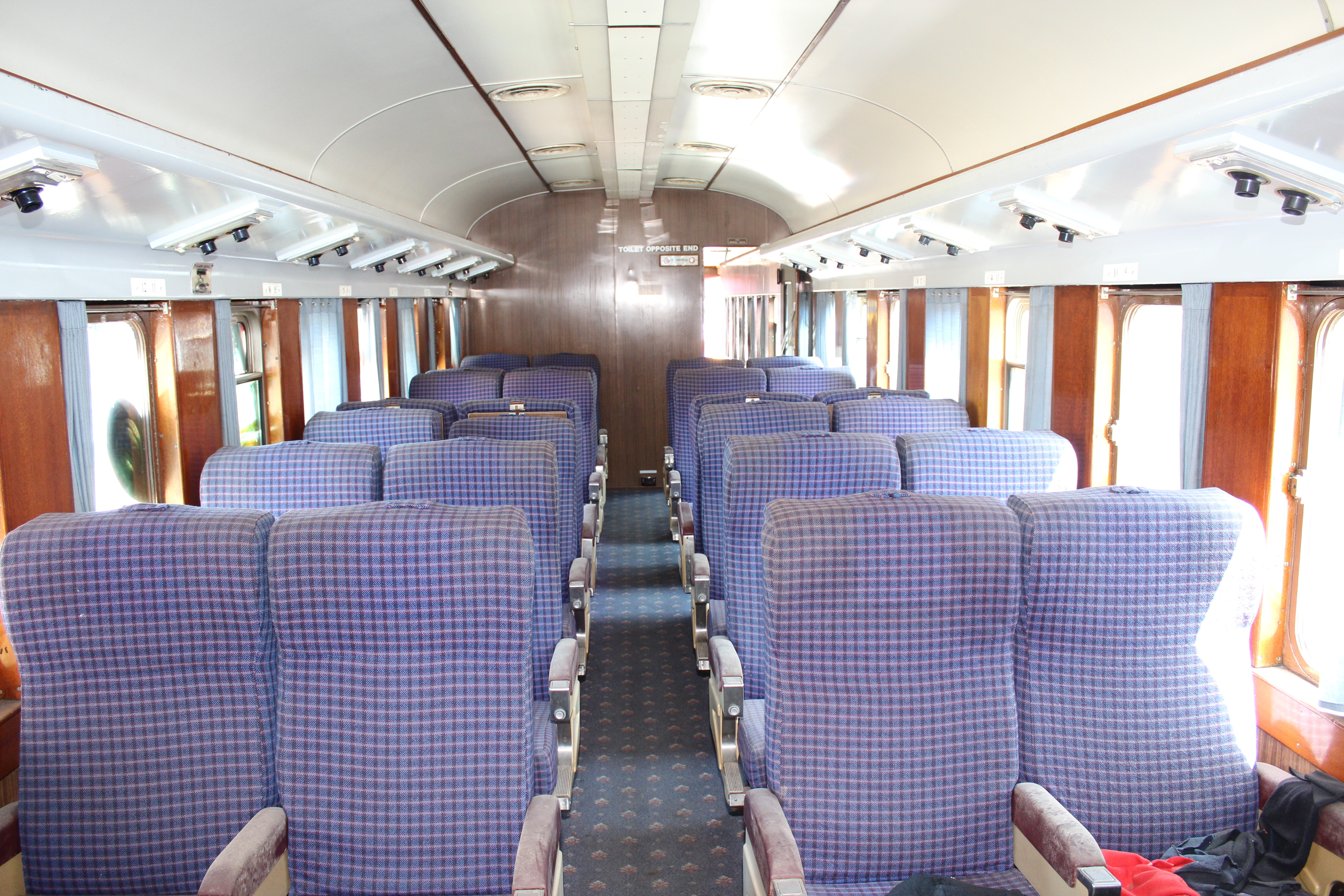
Passenger section of buffet car RDH 2233 in December 2012

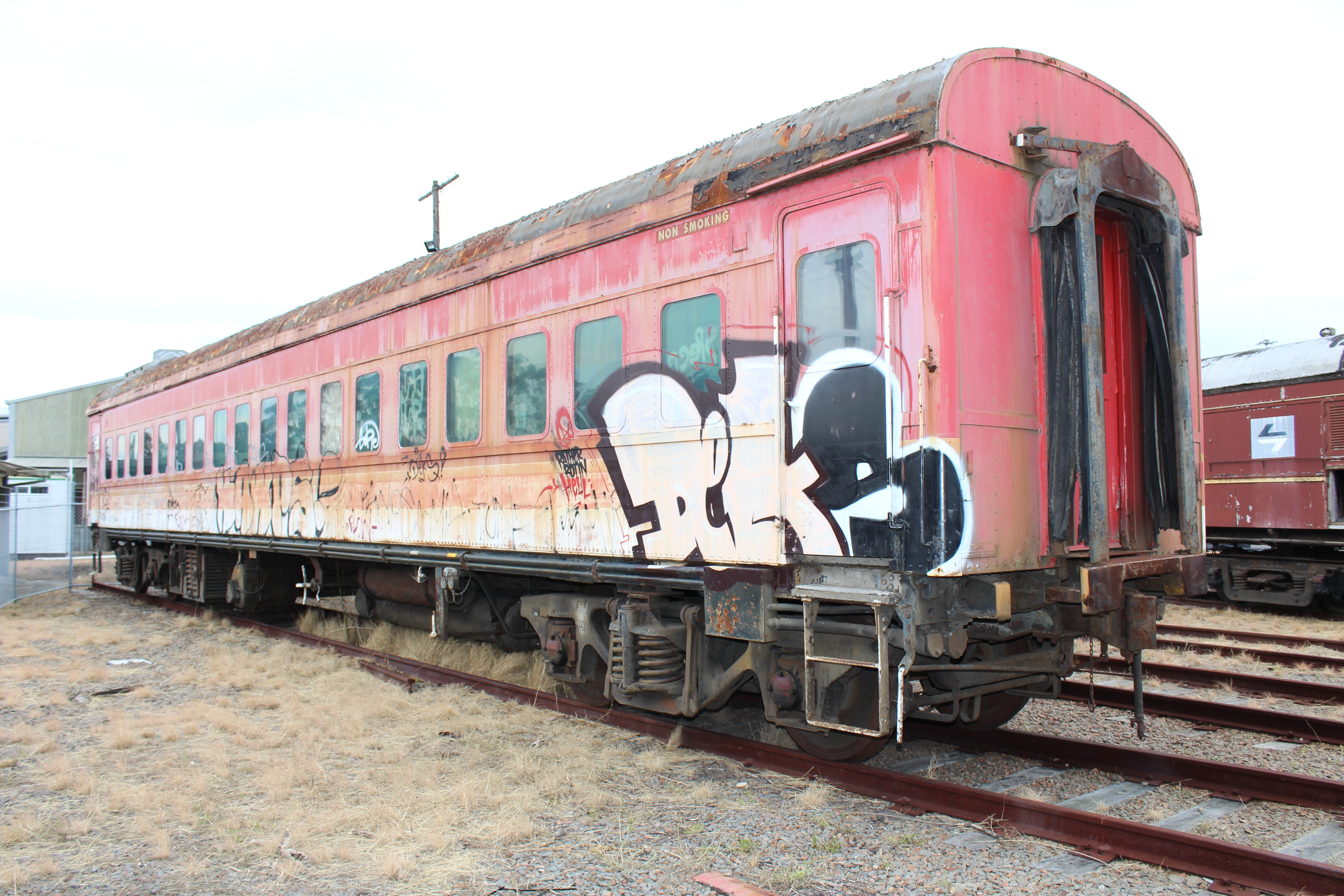
FH 2230 at Broadmeadow Locomotive Depot in December 2012

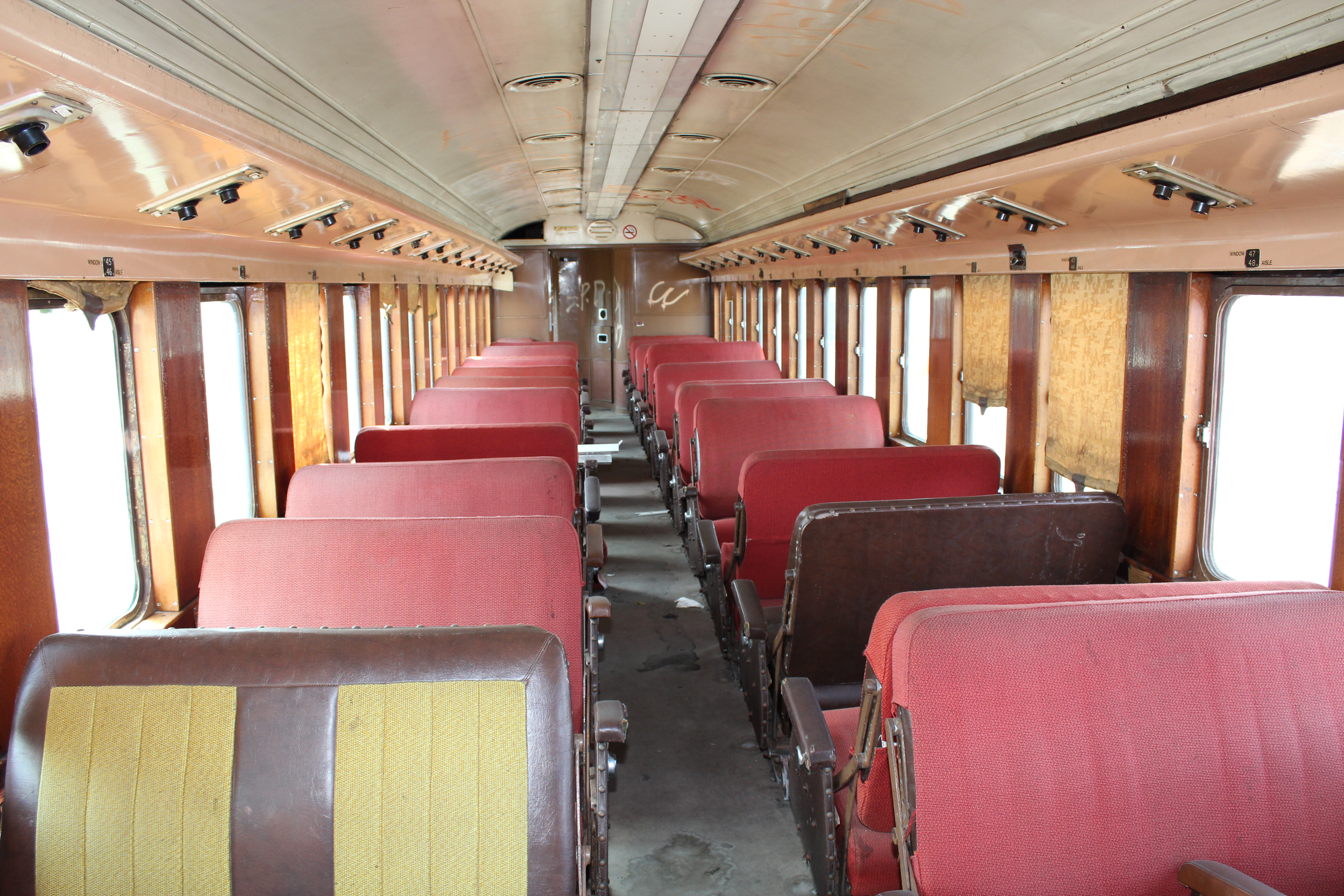
Interior of FH 2230 in December 2012

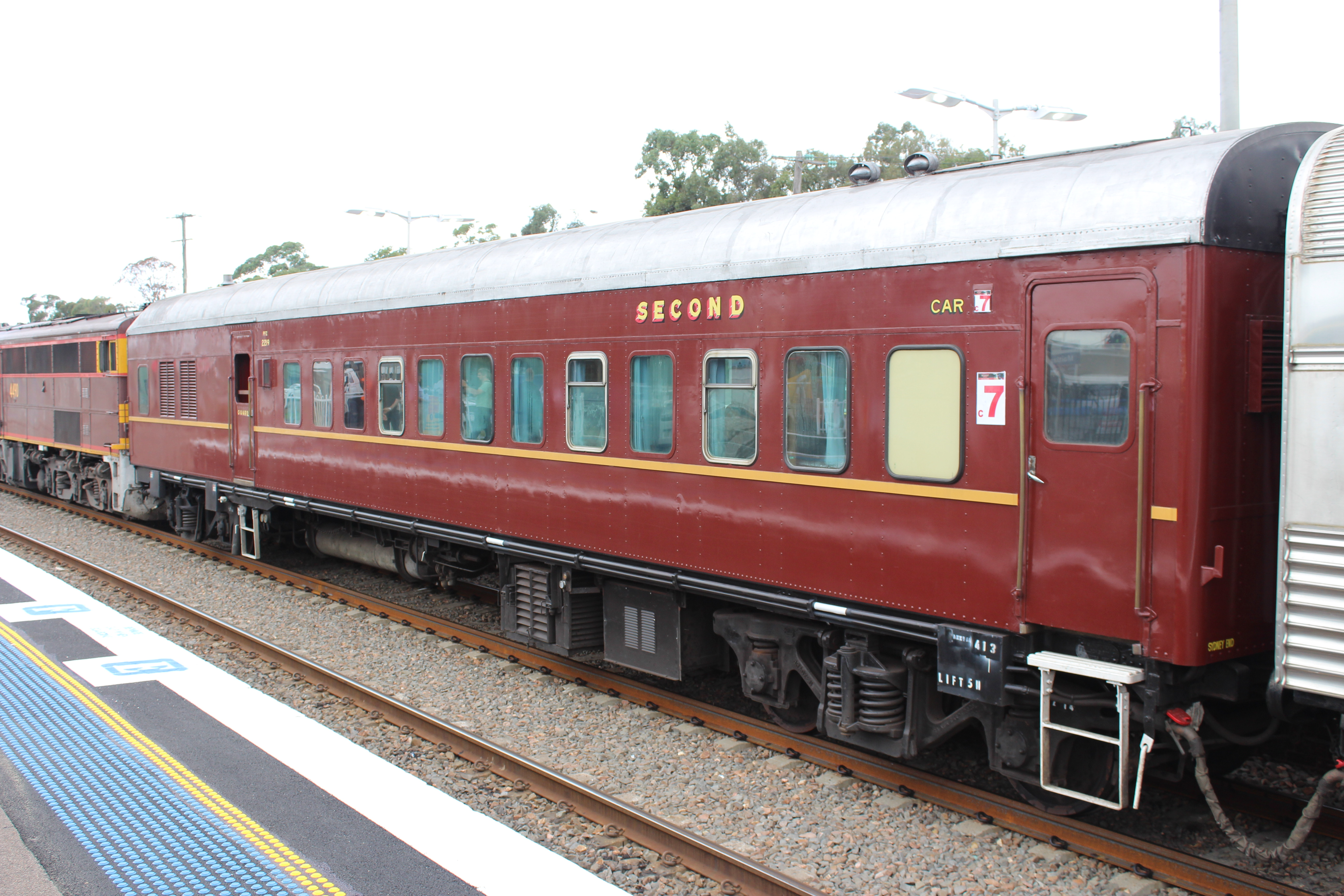
PFZ 2219 at Maitland in April 2014
