= Fairwind =

Fairwind may refer to one of the following ships:

- RMS Sylvania, an ocean liner which sailed under the name SS Fairwind between 1968 and 1988
- MV Fairwind, an Australian ship wrecked off the New South Wales coast in 1950
