= MV Fairwind =

Australian Army vessel

History
- Name: MSL 251; MV Fairwind
- Owner: Australian Army
- Operator: Department of External Territories
- Builder: Tullochs Pty Ltd
- Launched: 19 February 1946
- Completed: 5 September 1946
- Fate: Sunk in storm, 23 June 1950

General characteristics
- Class & type: 120ft Motor Lighter
- Tonnage: 250 tons
- Length: 120 ft (37 m)
- Beam: 24 ft (7.3 m)
- Draught: 9 ft (2.7 m)
- Propulsion: 2 x Ruston 6VCBM diesel engines

MV Fairwind (MSL 251) was an Australian Motor Stores Lighter wrecked off the New South Wales coast in 1950. MSL 251 and her sister ship, MSL 252 (later HMAS Paluma), were built by Tulloch's Pty Ltd for the Australian Army. Completed in September 1946, the vessel was loaned to the Department of External Affairs and used for fishery surveys by the Papua and New Guinea Administration. The Department renamed the vessel MV Fairwind.

== Loss ==
In 1950, while on passage from Port Moresby to Sydney, Fairwind disappeared off the mid-north coast of New South Wales during a cyclone. She was last sighted near Smoky Cape. The ship's last communication was a radio report on 23 June, where she indicated that she was seeking shelter behind North Solitary Island short of fuel, but that she would attempt to reach Coffs Harbour. Despite an extensive land and air search, the crew of 17, including 12 Papuans, were not found. It is official that all of the Fairwind's crew lost their lives in the sinking.

== Rediscovery ==
The fate of MV Fairwind was not positively established until August 2009, when her wreck was found in deep water off South West Rocks by a team of amateur divers. The wreck sits upright at a depth of 87 metres (285 ft). The wreck itself is mostly intact, with the forward and aft king posts projecting 15 metres (49 ft) from the seabed.
