= South Maitland Railway railcar =

Diesel railcar operated in Australia

South Maitland Railway Tulloch Railcars
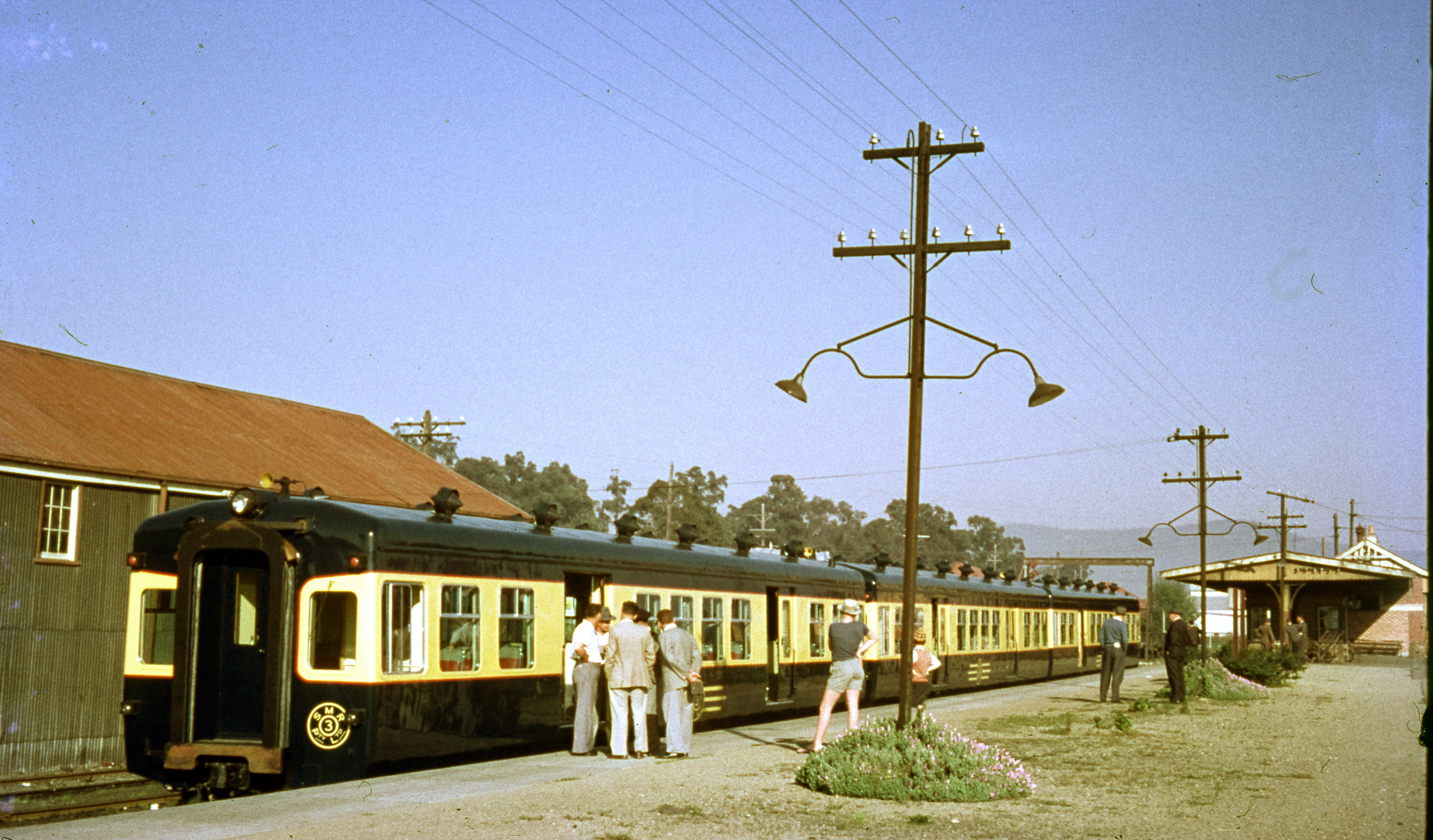
- No.3 at Cessnock Station in October 1961
- Manufacturer: Tulloch Limited
- Built at: Rhodes
- Constructed: 1961
- Scrapped: 1977
- Number built: 3
- Number scrapped: All
- Fleet numbers: 1–3
- Capacity: 80 seated
- Line served: South Maitland Railway

Specifications
- Car length: 18.5 m (60 ft 8 in)
- Width: 2.95 m (9 ft 8 in)
- Height: 4 m (13 ft 1 in)
- Maximum speed: 72 km/h (45 mph)
- Weight: 34.5 t (34 long tons; 38 short tons)
- Traction system: (?)
- Prime mover: Single Rolls-Royce C6s FLH
- Engine type: Diesel
- Transmission: Rolls-Royce DFR 10,000 Ms390 torque converter with CG 100 reverser
- Braking system: Westinghouse air
- Track gauge: 1,435 mm (4 ft 8 1/2 in) standard gauge

The South Maitland Railways railcar was a class of diesel railcar built by Tulloch Limited for the South Maitland Railway (SMR) in 1961.

Having had all of carriages destroyed by a fire in March 1930, the SMR arranged for services to be operated by the New South Wales Government Railways (NSWGR). However, with the service running at a considerable loss, the SMR sought to reduce costs by introducing diesel railcars.

In September 1958 Tulloch Limited to answer an enquiry from the SMR for diesel railcars submitted a 65-page proposal document to SMR. As a result of this proposal SMR also approached Commonwealth Engineering for a request for a tender. In 1959 an order was placed with Tulloch Limited with all delivered for services to commence on 1 October 1961.

Tulloch developed the design for the railcars with the assistance of Tube Investments of England whom Tulloch had had a technical assistance agreement since 1959. The car bodies and underframes were of mild steel construction. Upon completion the railcars were tested on the NSWGR network in the Sydney region, travelling as far as Penrith. Railcar No.1 was delivered to East Greta Junction on 26 April, followed by No.2 on 2 June and No.3 on 14 July.

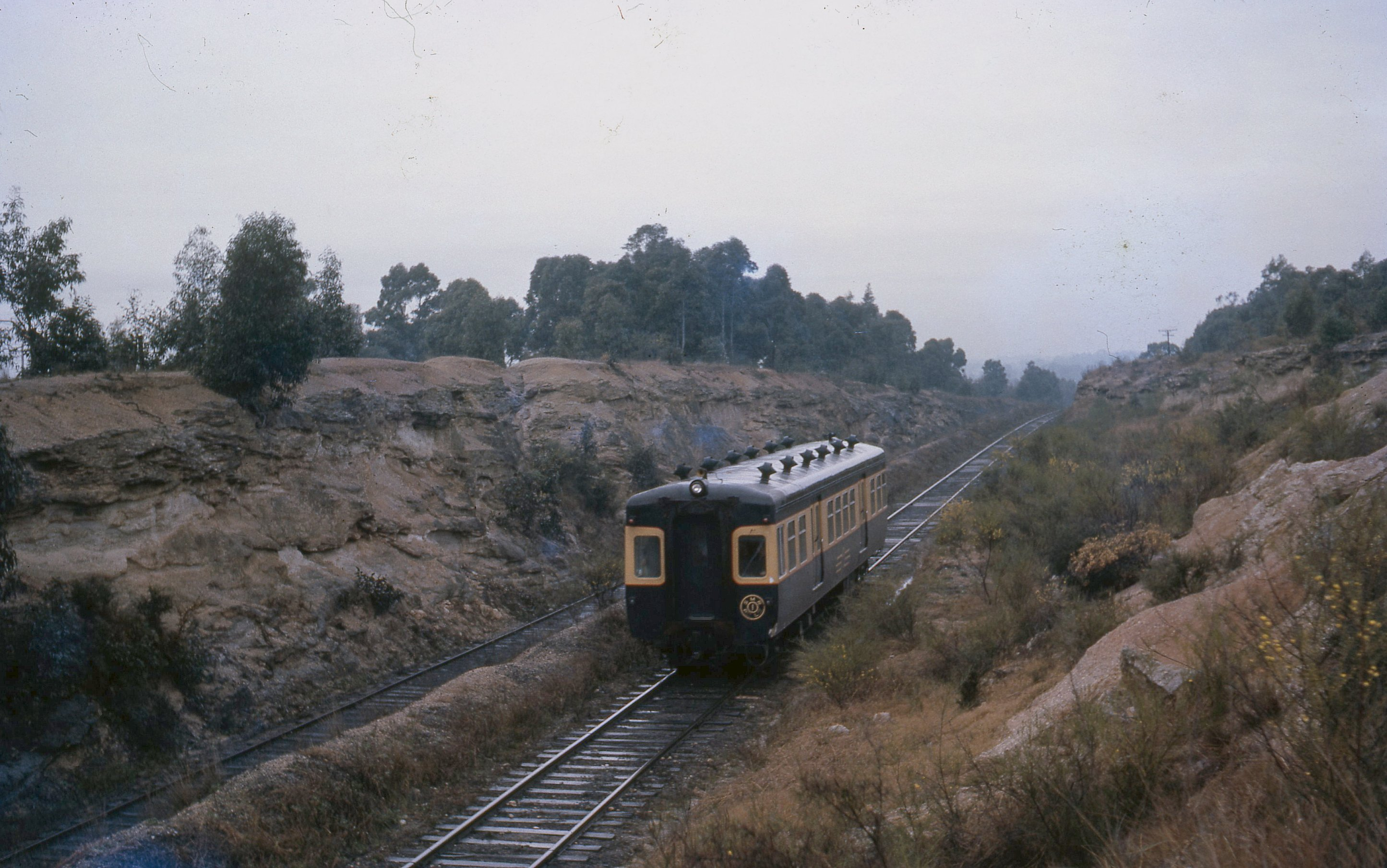
No.1 between Weston and Abermain in July 1962

They operated all services on the line from Cessnock to Maitland except for the daily Cessnock Express to Sydney which continued to be operated by the NSWGR. All were painted royal blue and yellow, perhaps using paint left over from the parallel Victorian Railways W class project. The original timetable provided services throughout the day, seven days a week. In May 1965, Saturday afternoon and all Sunday services were cancelled while off-peak services on weekdays were reduced to three in the morning and three in the afternoon.

In January 1967 all SMR operated passenger services were cancelled and the railcars withdrawn and placed in store at East Greta with a replacement Rover Motors bus service to Newcastle introduced. The through NSWGR operated services continued until May 1972. After attempts by SMR to sell the Tulloch railcars failed, they were scrapped in 1977.
