= Commonwealth Railways NT class =

Australian diesel-electric locomotive

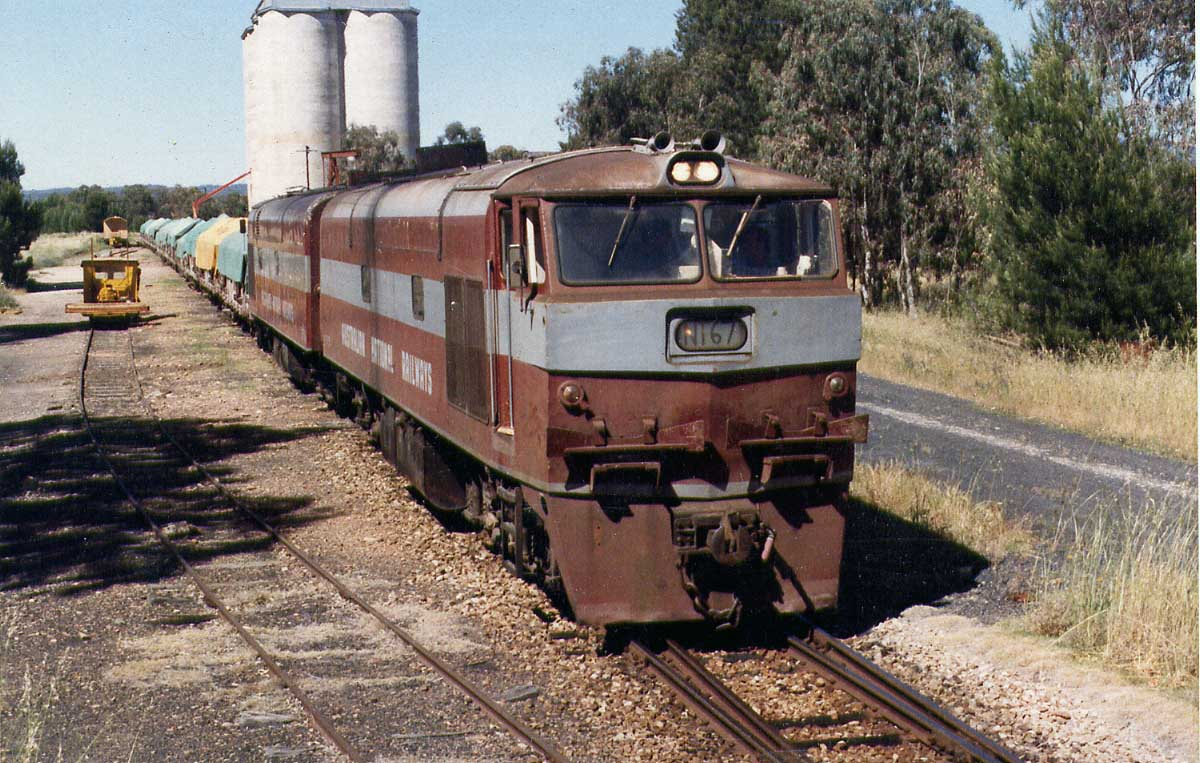
- NT class locomotives at Wirrabara in 1987
Type and origin
- Power type: Diesel-electric
- Builder: Tulloch Limited, Rhodes
- Serial number: 37 to 42 and 48 to 54
- Build date: 1965–1968
- Total produced: 13
Specifications
- Configuration
  - UIC: Co-Co
- Gauge: 1067 mm (3 ft 6 in)
- Length: 15.54 m (51 ft 0 in)
- Axle load: 12.9 t (12.7 long tons; 14.2 short tons)
- Loco weight: 70 t (69 long tons; 77 short tons)
- Fuel type: Diesel
- Prime mover: Sulzer 6LDA28C
- Generator: Associated Electrical Industries type TG.5302W
- Traction motors: Associated Electrical Industries type 253AZ
Performance figures
- Maximum speed: 80 km/h (50 mph)
- Power output: 970 kW (1,300 hp)
Career
- Operators: Commonwealth Railways
- Number in class: 13
- Numbers: NT65–NT77
- Preserved: NT76
- Disposition: 1 preserved, 12 scrapped

The NT class were a class of diesel-electric locomotives built between 1965 and 1968 by Tulloch Limited, Rhodes for the Commonwealth Railways. They saw service on the Central Australia Railway and North Australia Railway, and on the Port Lincoln Division of Australian National.

== History ==
In 1964 Commonwealth Railways ordered three locomotives from Tulloch Limited based on a Sulzer design that had entered service with the Nigerian Railway Corporation. The first was handed over on 12 May 1965 and named after Federal Minister for Shipping & Transport Gordon Freeth.

In 1966 a further three were delivered for the North Australia Railway. A further seven were delivered in 1968: two for the Central Australian Railway and five for the North Australia Railway. Following the delivery of the NJ class in 1971, all the five Central Australian units were transferred north.

In November 1972, three were destroyed in a run-away at Frances Bay freight yard. Following the closure of the North Australia Railway in December 1974, the remaining 10 NTs were transferred to the Central Australian Railway.

In July 1975, all were included in the transfer of Commonwealth Railways to Australian National. Following the closure of the narrow gauge Central Australian Railway in 1980, three were transferred to the Eyre Peninsula Railway and the others were withdrawn. The last three were withdrawn in the late 1980s. NTs 69 and 73 literally went out in a blaze of glory when, during their scrapping, they caught fire.

== Preservation ==
NT76 has been preserved. Owned and operated by Pichi Richi Railway, Quorn, it is commonly used on track maintenance duties, shunt movements and on days when a steam locomotive cannot be operated.

== Class workings ==
- NT65 – Named Gordon Freeth; Delivered 24 April 1965; First NT to work over the Quorn line on its delivery 1 May 1965 To Northern Australia Railway (NAR) 13 September 1971: To Central Australia Railway (CAR) 1976; Stored Port Augusta 1981; 575,954 km
- NT66 – Delivered 18 June 1965 via Broken Hill and Quorn; to NAR 4 October 1971; to CAR 1976; Stored Port Augusta 1981; 948,205 km
- NT67 – Delivered 4 August 1965 via Quorn line (10 August 1965); To NAR 14 February 1968; To CAR 1976 – used as Marree Narrow Gauge Shunter; Stored Port Augusta 1981; To Peterborough 1 February 1983 To Wilmington Line ~August 1984 – scrapped Gladstone 1989
- NT68 – Delivered 11 November 1966; To NAR 5 December 1966; Involved in major accident Darwin Yard 4 November 1972; To CAR 1975; Withdrawn at Port Augusta 1978.
- NT69 – Delivered 28 November 1966 via Quorn Line (3 December 1966); To NAR 20 December 1966; to CAR 1976; Stored Port Augusta 1981; To Peterborough 1 February 1983; Last North Australia South and North Bound trains 29/30 June 1976; to Port Lincoln 1984 – First to be repainted AN Corporate green and gold January 1985 following "rough" overhaul; Last mainline train from Rudall 11 April 1988. Last operated 21 June 1988 as Port Lincoln yard shunter Scrapped Port Lincoln 21 August 1990
- NT70 – Delivered 11 January 1967; to NAR 23 June 1967; Involved in major accident Darwin Yard 4 November 1972; Scrapped 1975
- NT71 – Delivered 1 February 1968 via Quorn Line (10 February 1968); To NAR 2 May 1968;Involved in major accident Darwin Yard 4 November 1972; Scrapped 1975
- NT72 – Delivered 21 March 1968 via Quorn Line (28 March 1968); To NAR 1 July 1968; to CAR 1976; Scrapped in 1978
- NT73 – Delivered 18 April 1968; to NAR 1 July 1968; to CAR 1976; To Gladstone 16 October 1981; to Port Lincoln ~February 1985 – repainted AN Corporate green and gold February 1985 following complete engine overhaul; Last mainline train from Rudall 11 April 1988; Last operated Port Lincoln 21 September 1988 as yard shunter Scrapped Port Lincoln 21 August 1990
- NT74 – Delivered 1 June 1968;to NAR 18 January 1971;to CAR 1976;To Peterborough 13 November 1981; Used to recover Quorn Line Assets; To Port Lincoln ?1984. Rewired Port Lincoln Workshops; stored following crankshaft failure at 28 July 1987 Scrapped Port Lincoln November 1989.
- NT75 – Delivered 28 June 1969; to NAR 27 August 1968; Involved in major accident Darwin Yard 4 November 1972 to CAR 1975 – Scrapped Port Augusta 1975
- NT76 – Delivered 12 August 1968; To NAR 1 November 1968; to CAR 1976; Last movement on CAR-Marree Yard Shunter 27 March 1980 to Gladstone 5 April 1980; First trip to Booleroo Centre with NSU56 9 April 1980; Used as trailing unit pending sound proofing: withdrawn from service 1986 transferred to Wilmington line ~1986 – Operational – Pichi Richi Railway
- NT77 – Delivered 25 September 1968; To NAR 5 August 1971; to CAR 1976 Scrapped Port Augusta 1976
