= DRC railcar =

Class of diesel rail car used in Australia

DRC Railcar
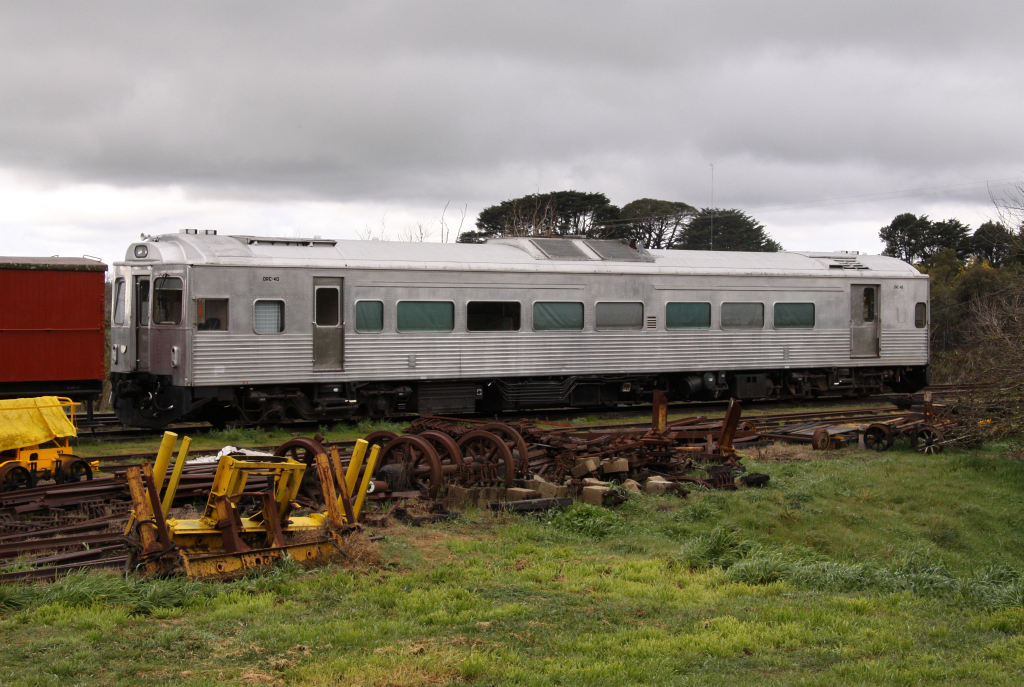
- DRC40 at Daylesford in 2009
- In service: 1971–1994
- Manufacturer: Tulloch Limited
- Built at: Rhodes
- Constructed: 1971–1973
- Entered service: 1971
- Number built: 4
- Fleet numbers: DRC40-DRC43
- Operators: Victorian Railways; V/Line

Specifications
- Car length: 23.47 m (77 ft 0 in)
- Width: 2.88 m (9 ft 5 in)
- Height: 4.18 m (13 ft 9 in)
- Maximum speed: 112 km/h (70 mph)
- Weight: 65 t (64.0 long tons; 71.7 short tons)
- Traction system: Diesel
- Prime mover: Cummins NTA 855-R
- Transmission: Voith T113 2 stage automatic hydraulic transmission, Dana-Spicer axle drive to one axle per bogie
- Track gauge: 1,600 mm (5 ft 3 in)

The DRC (Diesel Rail Car) is a class of railmotor operated by the Victorian Railways on its country rail network in Victoria, Australia. The cars were built by Tulloch Limited in New South Wales, and featured aluminium and steel construction, air-conditioning, and twin diesel engines with hydraulic transmissions.

== History ==
The first railcars of this type were built in 1970 for the New South Wales Government Railways as 1200 class railcars. The Victorian Railways decided to order two railcars of the same design, to replace the 280hp Walker railmotors then in use. The first DRC entered service in May 1971, classified DRC40, followed by DRC41 in November 1971.

The NSW fleet suffered numerous failures in service, and by 1974 the NSW Public Transport Commission had decided to withdraw the cars from service. Eight of them were converted to loco-hauled carriages in 1982, and used on the South Coast Daylight Express until January 1991, and on Moss Vale and Goulburn services until November 1993.

In 1974, the Victorian Railways purchased two of the withdrawn NSW 1200-class cars and modified them for Victorian use. They entered service as DRC42 (formerly PCH 1224) and DRC43 (formerly PCH 1227) in August and December 1975 respectively. Problems with reliability had emerged by the late 1970s, and a modification program was carried out at the Bendigo Workshops in 1983 and 1984. In 1984, four Harris suburban carriages were converted to MTH carriages for use as trailers with the DRC railcars.

== In service ==
In April 1974, Newsrail reported that the Victorian Railways proposed running package tours, using a DRC, on one Sunday each month. Hot lunches and evening meals would be provided, along with buses connecting to local tourist destinations. The first tour was supposed to be to Bairnsdale on 10 February but it was reported as having been cancelled. Other planned trips, on a roughly monthly basis, were to be to Ballarat for the Begonia Festival and Sovereign Hill, Bright for the Bright Autumn Festival, Swan Hill for the Pioneer Settlement (starting from Dandenong rather than the city), Bairnsdale for a cruise on the Gippsland Lakes, Albury for a tour of the city, Maryborough for the Golden Wattle Festival, Stawell for the Grampians wildflower season, Echuca for the Rich River Festival, Beechworth, and Port Fairy.

In the 1980s, the DRC railcars were the fastest trains in Australia by average speed, running the 107 km (66 mi) from Ararat to Hamilton on Mondays and Saturdays in 72 minutes, an average of 89 km/h (55 mph). The railcars were regularly used on the Stony Point service after 1984, following the reintroduction of passenger services on that line, but by the early 1990s, regular failures saw them replaced by locomotive-hauled trains.

The DRCs were also used on the Leongatha line for a few years, after the line was reopened in 1984, but were replaced by a locomotive-hauled train towing three MTH carriages. Although the reliability problem was later solved, the fleet was withdrawn on 2 July 1994, as a result of the introduction of the Goninan-built Sprinter railcars.

== Technical details ==
The features of the DRC railcar. No .1 end looking towards No .2:

- Driver's cab
- Luggage and guard's compartment
- First-class compartment: 20 rotating and reclining seats,
- Second-class compartment: 28 rotating seats, 8 fixed seats - 4 at each end

No.2 end:

- Exit doors
- Male and Female Toilets
- Driver's cab and seat for one person (Guard)

== Today ==
All four DRC cars still remain today. DRC40 is preserved and operational at the Daylesford Spa Country Railway, and DRC43 is stored in a deactivated condition at the Seymour Railway Heritage Centre. DRC41 and 42 are privately owned and stored at Newport Workshops.
