= New South Wales 1200 class railcar =

1200 class railcar
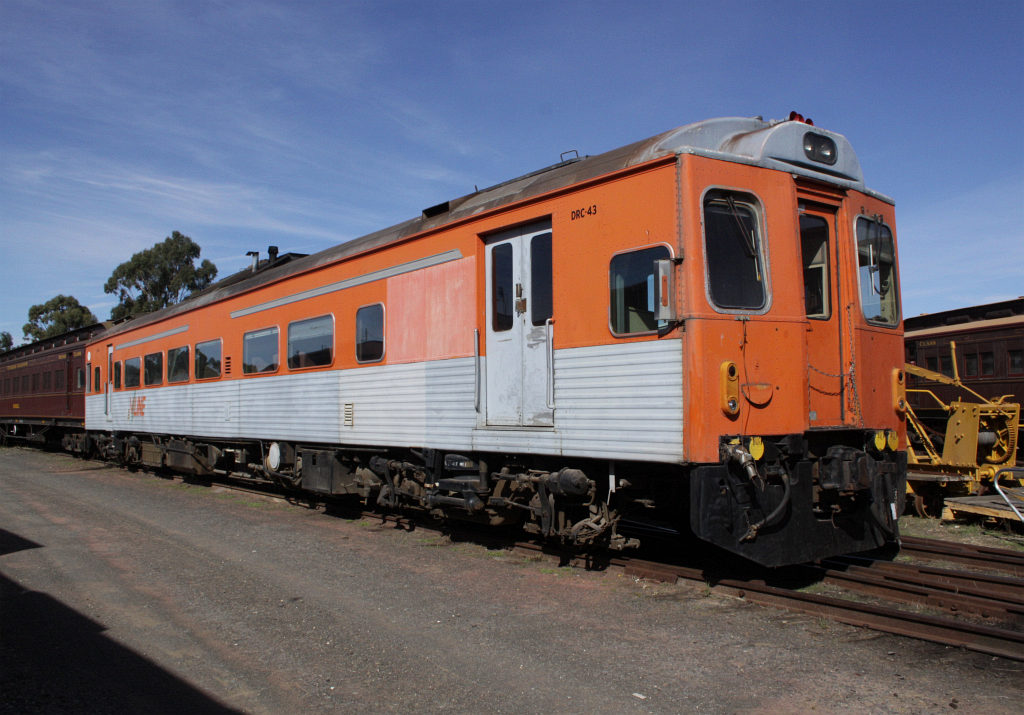
- 1200 after conversion to a Victorian Railways DRC railcar at Seymour Railway Heritage Centre in March 2010
- Manufacturer: Tulloch Limited
- Built at: Rhodes
- Constructed: 1970-1972
- Entered service: 1971-1993
- Number built: 10
- Number preserved: 6
- Fleet numbers: PCR 1201-1203; PCH 1221-1227
- Depot: ACDEP
- Lines served: Main South; Illawarra

Specifications
- Car length: 23.47 m (77 ft 0 in)
- Width: 2,910 mm (9 ft 6 5/8 in)
- Height: 4,180 mm (13 ft 8 5/8 in)
- Maximum speed: 112 km/h (70 mph)
- Traction system: Diesel mechanical
- Prime mover: Cummins NTA 855-R
- Engine type: Diesel
- Track gauge: 1,435 mm (4 ft 8 1/2 in) standard gauge

The 1200 class railcar or Tulloch railcar are a type of diesel railcar built by Tulloch Limited for the New South Wales railways department between June 1970 and May 1972. They were built to operate the Riverina Express before being transferred to the South Coast Daylight Express.

== History ==
In 1968, an order was placed with Tulloch Limited for 10 railcars for the Riverina Express with the fleet delivered between October 1970 and May 1972. While awaiting delivery of sufficient cars to operate the service, some were used on Goulburn Day Train and South Coast Daylight Express services in company with the 1100 class railcars. In addition, two vehicles were also constructed for Victorian Railways as their DRC Class.

The ten cars were built in two configurations, one with a buffet section and seating for 8 First class and 36 Second Class (numbered PCR 1201-1203) and the other seating 18 First Class, 36 Second Class and a separate luggage compartment (numbered PCH 1221-1227). The objective was to provide two four-car trains, each consisting of one PCR and three PCH along with one spare car of each type.

They entered service on the Riverina Express in May 1972. The purpose of forming the trains with individual railcars was to allow it to divide at major stations along the route where cars detached for Cowra, Tumut, Lake Cargelligo and Hillston on selected days, as well as the traditional destinations of Griffith and Albury. On the return journey, the cars amalgamated again to form a single train back to Sydney.

The 1200s soon began to suffer equipment failures, particularly with their complex electrical system, especially when amalgamating. Following one car suffering a distorted engine support frame all were withdrawn in January 1973. The damaged car became an office. One set of four was returned to operate the service three days a week with locomotive hauled and later DEB sets operating it on the other days. This remaining cars were withdrawn in October 1975 when a second DEB set was transferred.

In May 1974, two cars (PCH 1224 and PCH 1227) were sold to Victorian Railways to complement the two DRC railcars it had purchased new. In 1977 four were converted to operate an exhibition train around New South Wales for the Silver Jubilee of Elizabeth II. Three more were pooled with the 1100 class railcars on Illawarra line services while the car with a damaged engine frame became an office. In 1981 it was decided to convert the latter and two of the Jubilee cars into loco hauled cars, the remaining five were similarly treated in 1983. They were placed in service on the Illawarra line between Sydney and Bomaderry.

They did occasionally stray operating both the Canberra Express and Newcastle Flyer in January 1986.

Following the cessation of locomotive hauled South Coast services in January 1991, they were redeployed to operate services on the Main South line to Moss Vale and Goulburn.

In February 1993, six of the carriages were given a light refurbishment before being withdrawn in November 1993. In August 1994, six were auctioned.
