= Riverina Express =

Australian passenger train (1949–1993)

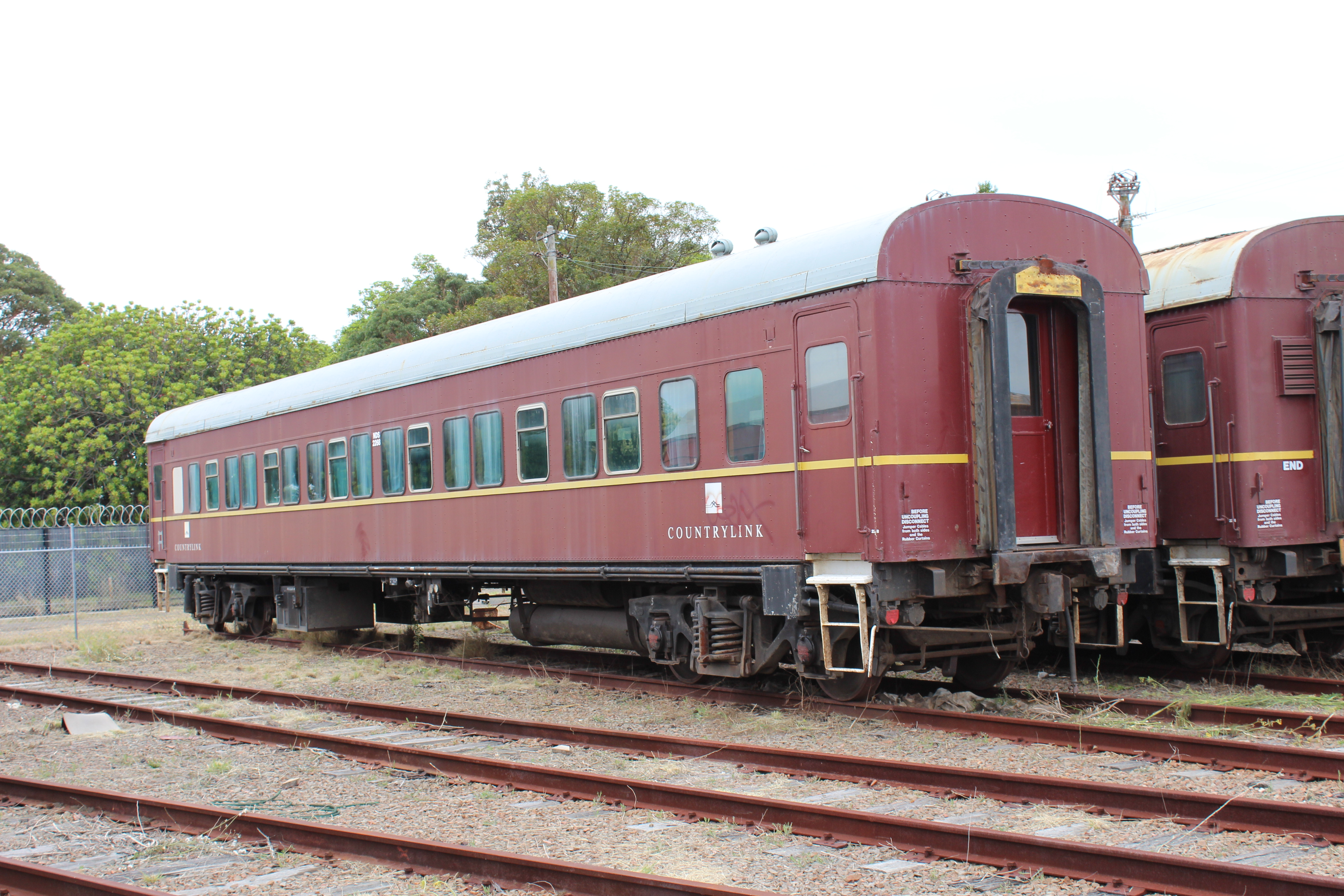
- RUB carriage at Broadmeadow Locomotive Depot in December 2012

Overview
- Service type: Passenger train
- Status: Ceased
- First service: September 1949
- Last service: December 1994
- Former operator: State Rail Authority

Route
- Termini: Sydney; Albury; Griffith
- Distance travelled: 642 km (Albury); 640 km (Griffith)
- Service frequency: Daily in each direction
- Lines used: Main South; Hay branch Griffith branch

The Riverina Express was a passenger train operated by the New South Wales Government Railways between Sydney, Griffith and Albury from September 1949 until November 1993.

== History ==
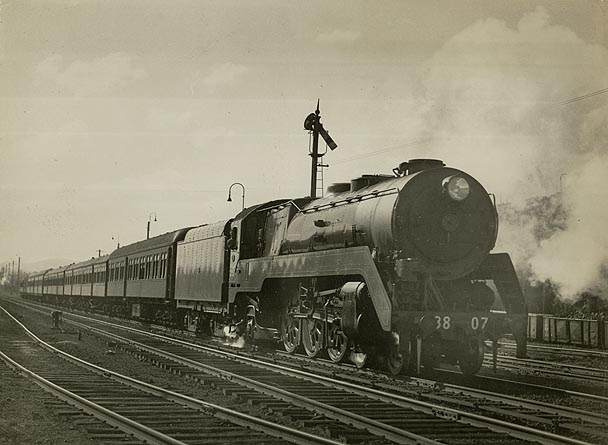
38 class hauled Sydney to Albury train at Goulburn in June 1946

The Riverina Express was introduced in September 1949 and operated during daylight hours travelling along the Main South line to both Griffith and Albury at various stages during its life. With the change to XPT operation in August 1982, all services ran to Albury. In November 1993, it was extended to Melbourne and renamed the Melbourne Daylight XPT.

== Rolling stock ==
It was initially operated by a locomotive hauled, air-conditioned set of RUB set carriages. In February 1972 the RUB sets were replaced by ten 1200 class Tulloch diesel railcars. These were designed to split en route allowing carriages to detach for Cowra, Tumut, Lake Cargelligo and Hillston on selected days. The 1200s suffered from regular equipment failures, particularly with their complex electrical systems and they were replaced by locomotive hauled sets from January 1973.

One 1200 set was returned from February 1973 with a locomotive set used on alternate days until replaced by a DEB railcar set in August 1973. In October 1975 a second DEB set replaced the remaining 1200 set. At this stage the service operated to Griffith five times a week and Albury only once per week.

In August 1982, the service (which by now only went to Albury) was taken over by a XPT set and renamed the Riverina XPT. In December 1994 an XPT daylight service to Melbourne was introduced by extending the Riverina XPT from Albury.
