= 120ft Motor Lighter =

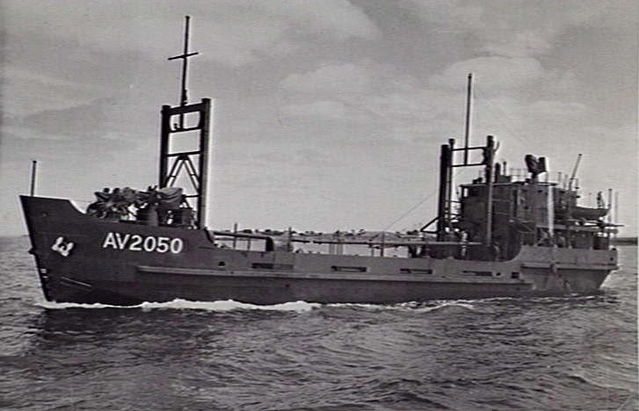
- Australian Army 120ft motor lighter AV2050 during World War II

Class overview
- Name: 120ft Motor Lighter
- Operators: Royal Australian Navy; Australian Army; Royal Australian Air Force; Royal Navy; United States Army
- Completed: ~50

General characteristics
- Type: Motor Lighter
- Tonnage: 250 tons
- Length: 120 ft (37 m)
- Beam: 24 ft (7.3 m)
- Draught: 9 ft (2.7 m)
- Propulsion: Diesel engines

The 120 ft Motor Lighter was a class of lighters designed by the Australian Shipbuilding Board during World War II and built for the Royal Australian Navy, Australian Army, Royal Australian Air Force, Royal Navy and the US Army.

== Design ==
The lighters were 120 feet (37 m) in length, 9 feet (2.7 m) depth and 24 feet (7.3 m) breadth and cost about $120,000 each to build.

== Operators ==
=== Royal Australian Navy ===
The Royal Australian Navy ordered three refrigerator, two stores and nine water variants.

Ship	Built	Builder	Service	Notes
MRL 251				
MRL 252				
MRL 253		Johnson's Shipyard, Melbourne		Renamed HMAS Gayundah in 1969.
MRL 254				Order cancelled
MRL 255				Order cancelled
MSL 251		Tulloch Limited, Rhodes		Loaned to Department of External Territories, sank during a storm on 23 June 1950, with 17 lives lost.
MSL 252		State Dockyard, Newcastle	1946–1973	Converted to a survey vessel in 1958, renamed HMAS Paluma. Paid off on 30 March 1973, and sold in 1974.
MWL 251				Renamed HMAS Gunga Din.
MWL 252				Order cancelled.
MWL 253				
MWL 254				Broken up at Homebush Bay.
MWL 255		State Dockyard, Newcastle		
MWL 256		State Dockyard, Newcastle		Renamed HMAS Lonsdale, later HMAS Gunga Din II.
MWL 257				Sold for scrapping in 1985.
MWL 258				Order cancelled.
MWL 259				Order cancelled.

=== Australian Army ===
Thirty one vessels were ordered by the Australian Army.

Ship	Built	Builder	Service	Notes
AV 2050 Elspeth				
AV 2051				
AV 2052		Johnson's Shipyard, Melbourne	1945	For auction in 1948.
AV 2053				
AV 2054				
AV 2055				
AV 2056 Evelyn				
AV 2057				
AV 2058				
AV 2059				
AV 2060				
AV 2061				
AV 2062				
AV 2063				
AV 2064				
AV 2065				
AV 2066 Ellen				Transferred to Royal Navy as MSL 41
AV 2067 Endeavour				Transferred to Royal Navy as MSL 42
AV 2068				For auction incomplete in 1948.
AV 2069				
AV 2070				
AV 2071				
AV 2072				
AV 2073				
AV 2074				
AV 2075 Emily				
AV 2076				
AV 2077				
AV 2078				
AV 2079				
AV 2080 Ebbtide				Transferred to Royal Navy as MRL 21

=== Royal Australian Air Force ===
The Royal Australian Air Force ordered five vessels.

=== Royal Navy ===
Ship	Built	Builder	Service	Notes
MSL 41				
MSL 42				
MRL 21				

=== United States Army ===
Ship	Built	Builder	Service	Notes
OL-22				
