= Victorian Railways W class =

Class of Australian 0-6-0dh locomotives

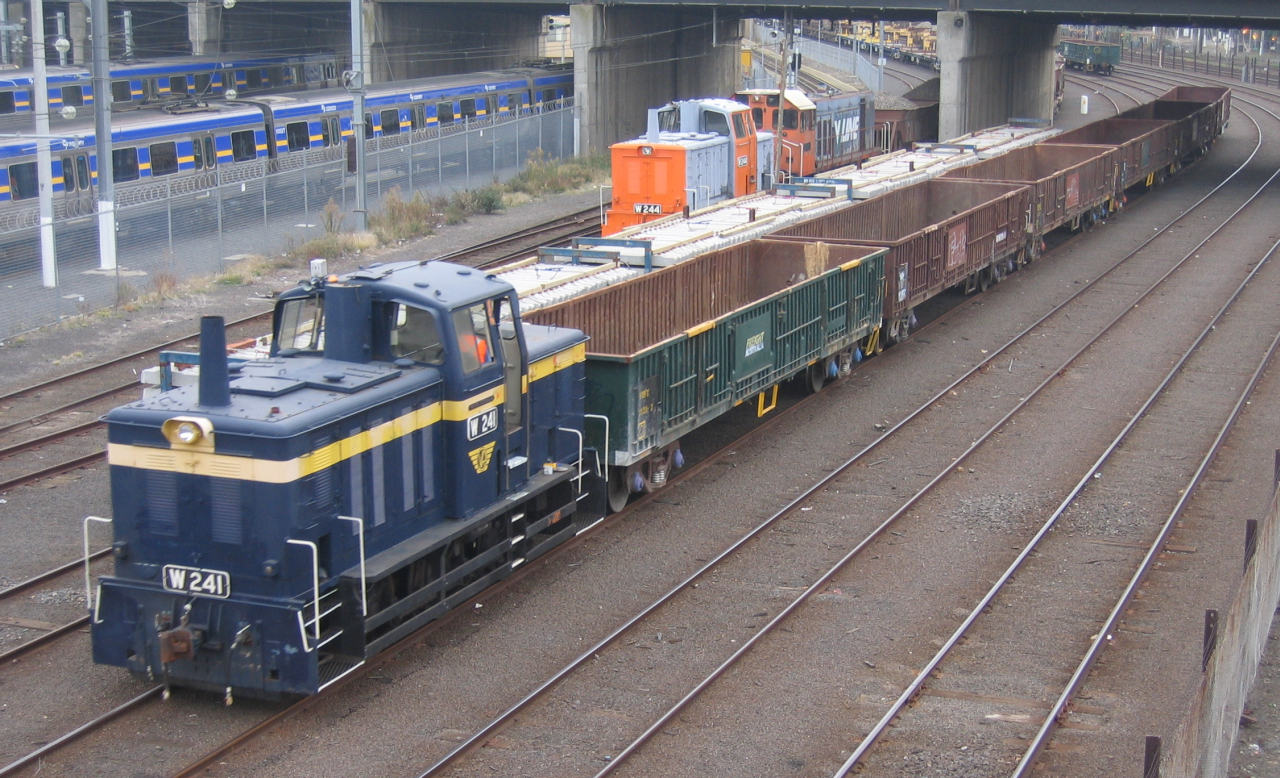
- El Zorro locomotives W241 (blue) and W244 (orange) on works trains in Melbourne
Type and origin
- Power type: Diesel-hydraulic
- Builder: Tulloch Limited, Rhodes, New South Wales
- Build date: 1959-1961
- Total produced: 27
Specifications
- Configuration
  - Whyte: 0-6-0DM
  - UIC: C
- Gauge: 5 ft 3 in (1,600 mm) (2241-265, W267 initially); 4 ft 8 1/2 in (1,435 mm) (7101, W266-W267)
- Length: 9.34 m (30 ft 8 in)
- Loco weight: 49 t (48 long tons; 54 short tons)
- Fuel type: Diesel
- Prime mover: Mercedes-Benz, Detroit Diesel 12V-149
- Engine type: V12 diesel
- Cylinders: 12
- Transmission: Hydraulic
- Couplers: Automatic coupler
Performance figures
- Maximum speed: 32 km/h (20 mph)
- Power output: 650 hp (480 kW)
Career
- Operators: Victorian Railways; NSW Department of Railways
- Class: W
- Number in class: 27
- Numbers: 241-267, 7101
- First run: 1959
- Disposition: 5 preserved, 22 scrapped

The W class are a diesel-hydraulic shunting locomotive ordered and operated by the Victorian Railways of Australia. One briefly operated as the 71 class of the New South Wales Department of Railways.

== History ==
In mid 1957, the Victorian Railways called for tenders for a fleet of 25 diesel-hydraulic locomotives rated at 500 hp (370 kW). Tulloch, based in Rhodes, New South Wales, won the contract with an offer for West German-style locomotives, using a Mercedes V12 diesel engine developing 660 hp (490 kW) which was coupled to a Krupp 2W1D46 hydraulic transmission powering the centre axle, with the leading and trailing axles powered via connecting rods. All 25 engines entered service in the year from December 1959.

Tulloch expected a repeat order for a further 25 units from the Victorian Railways, and also built a standard gauge version numbered 7101 as a demonstrator unit for the New South Wales Railways. However, the latter system rejected the design as unsuitable, so that unit was sold to the Victorian Railways and used for construction trains on the Albury NSW to Melbourne standard gauge line. After that project was completed, it became one of the standard gauge shunting units operating between South Dynon and Spencer Street station. The final engine, W267, had been built in anticipation of the repeat order that never eventuated - while the contract was written, it was never signed. Instead, the final engine was converted to standard gauge and shared duties with W266.

The locomotives were of the 0-6-0 wheel arrangement, fitted with a 12-cylinder Mercedes-Benz engine, Krupp hydraulic transmission and axle-gear and Behr hydraulic cooling equipment.

=== In service ===
The class was generally allocated to Ballarat, Geelong and Melbourne for short shunting trips, and one each at Ararat, Bendigo and Seymour, explicitly for yard work only. However, on the odd occasion, Seymour-based W241 was used on the Shepparton goods, and also ran out to Rushworth and Colbinabbin. It also made it to Benalla a few times.

The engines were initially rostered on local passenger services to Werribee and trialled on Bacchus Marsh runs, but with the low speed limit of 40 mph (65 km/h) and relatively little power, they were unable to keep to the timetable to the latter.

The engines proved incredibly unpopular, due to problems with ride quality and engine reliability, and a transmission change needed to achieve mainline running speeds. The high gear setting was removed early on and the class relegated to shunting duties in an attempt to better utilise the fleet. However, the cab profile made visibility a problem in yards, and engine crews had to lean out the side to observe shunting instructions. The cab design also provided no shelter from the weather in storms or on hot days. Common failures included seized transmissions, oil leaking onto the shunters' steps creating a slip hazard, and failed engine blocks.

Records of W class locomotives at Ballarat are recorded every few issues in Divisional Diary, later Newsrail; for example December 1973 (p.249).

=== New South Wales 71 class locomotive ===
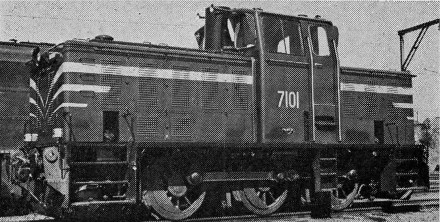
7101 at Delec Locomotive Depot in 1961

Having just completed 25 1,600 mm (5 ft 3 in) 650 hp (480 kW) diesel-hydraulic shunting W class locomotives for the Victorian Railways, Tulloch Limited, with a view to receiving an order for similar units, offered the NSW Department of Railways a similar 1,435 mm (4 ft 8 1/2 in) standard gauge version in 1960 for a 12-month testing period. The offer was accepted and the unit was taken into service on 11 November 1960, numbered 7101. Although allocated to Delec Locomotive Depot, all servicing was done at Tulloch Limited. No. 7101 was used on local transfer and shunting trips in the Sydney metropolitan area. It operated under conditions similar to the 70-class then in operation. In mid-1961, Tulloch Limited was experiencing operating difficulties and was unable to fulfil its obligations in regard to the hiring. 7101 was returned on 21 June 1961 and sold to Victorian Railways

=== Victorian use on standard gauge ===
==== W266 ====
The Victorian Railways purchased 7101 from Tulloch, had it repainted in blue and gold and renumbered as W266 and had it delivered on 4 July 1961, though it retained its ex-NSW horns. It was initially deployed on the North East standard gauge line between Albury and Melbourne. It worked the first ballast trains with five gauge-converted NN ballast hoppers. The locomotive and its ballast train arrived in Seymour on 14 January 1961, then Melbourne on 29 November the same year. By January 1962 the engine was working as the yard pilot (shunting locomotive) in the North Dynon freight terminal compound, and a few months later it became the dedicated shunting engine for passenger trains between the carriage sidings at South Dynon and the standard gauge platforms at Spencer Street Station. However, it disgraced itself on 28 May 1963 at 6:30pm, failing at the crest of the North Melbourne flyover and blocking interstate trains, and so was returned to freight duties, now including occasional trips between Dynon, Somerton and Upfield. It ran part of one tour for the Australian Railway Historical Society (because its classmate W267 had failed) on 15 June 1964..

It was converted to broad gauge on 19 April 1969, and subsequently allocated as the new Melbourne Yard hump trimmer, sitting near the crest of the new hump ready to push wagons that failed to roll down as far as required. In this role the engine was provided with a two-way radio, giving direct communication to the new West Tower operator. By 1975 it had been absorbed into the normal W Class fleet, being sighted at North Geelong locomotive depot on Sunday 8 June 1975.

The engine was cut up during the middle of July 1981.

==== W267 ====
W267 was built by Tulloch in anticipation of a further order that the Victorian Railways never actually signed. It was delivered to Bandiana as a broad gauge engine loaded on flat wagon QH2, formerly a Spirit of Progress locomotive tender frame, and was sighted shunting at Spencer Street station in December 1961, testing some design alterations that ultimately proved unsuccessful. It was then taken to Newport Workshops for conversion to standard gauge, and entered service by April 1962, initially as a freight yard pilot. By 29 May 1963 it was used as the Spencer Street standard gauge pilot, but only if another locomotive was not available; and remained in that limited role for many years, though it was absent for a few months in 1972 and sighted at Dynon with its engine removed during a transmission replacement. (Note: This entry erroneously states W267 was converted to broad gauge; the next reference corrected that.) As of 1975/76 there were three standard gauge shunting rosters ("pilots") in the central Melbourne area - Dynon, Upfield, and Passenger Yard, the latter allocated to W267 working day shift to sort passenger cars and assemble the interstate passenger trains at South Dynon carriage shed. This engine, or either of the other pilots if available, would also run to Spencer Street to shunt vans and Motorail wagons of the interstate arrivals and departures, and haul back arriving GM class locomotives that had been leased from the Commonwealth Railways but which did not have the ability to drive in reverse from Spencer Street back to the South Dynon engine depot.

The engine remained in use on standard gauge until its last job on 4 March 1979, the 8:55 am passenger "drop-on pilot". On return to Dynon it was intended to remove the cab and transport the underframe to Newport Workshops in a well wagon, but no wagon was available so it was reassembled and stored. Then, on 2 May 1979, the engine was transferred to broad gauge axles, and on 5 May 1979 it was towed to Newport for longer-term storage and eventual scrapping. This made W267 the first Victorian Railways' diesel locomotive to be scrapped, other than S314 and S316 which had been destroyed in 1969.

=== Modifications ===
Engines were fitted with controls on both sides of the centre console, although that feature was removed not long after delivery.}

The first few engines (at least through to W244) entered service with slotted pilots similar to those of the F class engines, but these were not provided on later builds and were gradually removed.

Between 1973 and 1977, at least ten engines, starting with W249, had the Mercedes engine removed and replaced with General Motors diesel units. Engines after the first had different exhaust arrangements, but all those refitted could be identified externally by a second exhaust stack at the end of the long hood, with the original adjacent to the driving cabin plated over. The alterations raised the engine hood by 8.0 in (203 mm) but did not replace the original transmission or gearbox.

As of the end of June 1976, seven engines - 241, 244, 245, 249, 252, 255 and 259 - had been fitted with the upgraded engines.

=== Withdrawal and Preservation ===
As at 14 July 1986, only ten W class engines - 241, 244, 247, 249, 255, 259, 260, 262 and 263 - remained on V/Line's rolling stock register. By 25 April 1987 W241 and W244 were being used as shunters within Geelong locomotive depot only, and W251 at Newport Workshops. W250 was transferred to the Yarra Valley Tourist Railway on 8 November 1986, and was in use working ballast trains by 22 November the same year. W243 was stored pending placement in the Newport Railway Museum and W260 stored pending delivery to the Castlemaine and Maldon Railway. Four engines - W246, W256, W257 and W267 - had been cut up, and all other engines were stored in various places, such as Newport, Spotswood or Cowper Street. The set of engines previously stored at Spotswood Reclamation Depot had been moved to Spotswood Steam Depot by September 1987.

== Locomotives ==
Table details are drawn from Newsrail, December 1982, unless otherwise marked.

Locomotive	Builders No.	Named	Built	In service	Upgraded engine	Current/Last owner	1982 status	Current status	Notes
W241	006	Peter Steward	1959	21 December 1959	Y	Mornington Railway	At Seymour under repairs	Preserved - Operational	Delivered 20 September 2015
W242	007		January 1960	30 January 1960	N	Victorian Railways	At Ballarat	Scrapped	
W243	008		February 1960	26 February 1960	N	Newport Railway Museum	At Ballarat	Preserved - Static	
W244	009		March 1960	14 March 1960	Y	Victrack	At Newport	Stored	Ex 707 Operations, Now Returned to Victrack for Re Allocation after being Deemed Surplus of Use.
W245	010		March 1960	1 April 1960	Y	Victorian Railways		Scrapped 30 September 1982	
W246	011		April 1960	25 April 1960	N	Victorian Railways	At Ballarat Workshops under repairs	Scrapped	
W247	012		May 1960	9 May 1960	N	Victorian Railways	At Ballarat as workshops pilot	Scrapped July 1987	
W248	013		May 1960	22 May 1960	N	Victorian Railways	At Ballarat	Scrapped 26 April 1983	
W249	014		May 1960	30 May 1960	Y	Victorian Railways	At Bendigo	Scrapped July 1987	General Motors Engine fitted, returned to traffic 1 February 1973.
W250	015		June 1960	10 June 1960	Y	Yarra Valley Tourist Railway	At Ballarat under repairs	Preserved - Operational	
W251	016		June 1960	20 June 1960		Victorian Railways		Scrapped 30 September 1982	
W252	017		June 1960	30 June 1960	Y	Victorian Railways	At Ballarat under repairs	Scrapped	
W253	018		July 1960	13 July 1960	N	Victorian Railways	At Ballarat Workshops under repairs	Scrapped	
W254	019		July 1960	23 July 1960		Victorian Railways		Scrapped 1 June 1982	
W255	020		July 1960	2 August 1960	Y	Newport Railway Museum	At Newport as pilot	Preserved - Static	General Motors Engine fitted.
W256	022		August 1960	13 August 1960		Victorian Railways		Scrapped 24 March 1982	
W257	023		August 1960	26 August 1960	Y	Victorian Railways	At Ballarat Workshops under repairs	Scrapped	
W258	024		August 1960	6 September 1960	N	Victorian Railways	At Geelong	Scrapped	
W259	025		September 1960	28 September 1960	Y	Victorian Railways	At Bendigo as workshops pilot	Scrapped July 1987	
W260	026		September 1960	4 October 1960	N	RLG	At Ballarat as pilot	Scrapped 2010	Scrapped at the Seymour Rail Heritage Centre. Was the last remaining unit (aside from W243) fitted with an original Mercedes engine. Was displayed at Tocumwal.
W261	027		October 1960	21 October 1960	N	Victorian Railways		Scrapped 1 June 1982	
W262	029		November 1960	18 November 1960	Y	Victorian Railways	At Geelong	Scrapped July 1987	
W263	030		November 1960	27 November 1960	N	Victorian Railways	At Ararat	Scrapped July 1987	
W264	032		December 1960	10 December 1960	N	Victorian Railways		Scrapped 30 September 1982	
W265	031		December 1960	22 December 1960	N	Victorian Railways		Scrapped 24 December 1981	
W266	028		October 1960	6 July 1960	Y	Victorian Railways		Scrapped 1 June 1982	Standard gauge pilot. Ex NSW 7101
W267	036		November 1960	18 December 1960	N	Victorian Railways		Scrapped May 1980	Was broad gauge until 10 February 1962.

== See also ==
- WAGR T class (diesel)
