= WAGR T class (diesel) =

Class of Australian 0-6-0 locomotives

Western Australian Government Railways T class
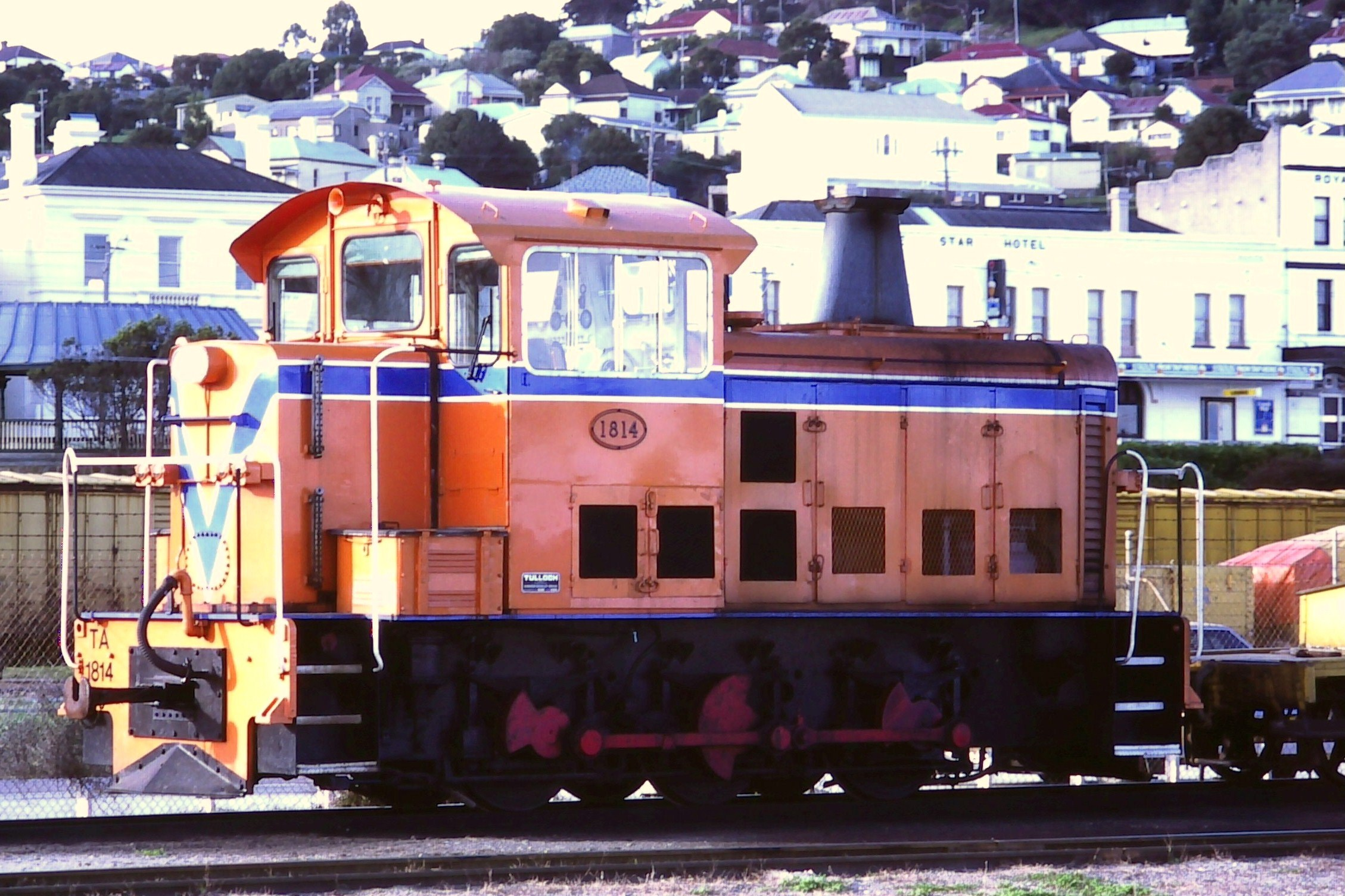
- TA1814 at Albany in July 1986
Type and origin
- Power type: Diesel-electric
- Builder: Tulloch Limited, Rhodes
- Model: 1CS, 2CS
- Build date: 1967–1970
- Total produced: 15
Specifications
- Configuration
  - AAR: C
  - UIC: C
- Gauge: 1,067 mm (3 ft 6 in)
- Length: 7.57 m (24 ft 10 in)
- Loco weight: 36.75 long tons (37.34 t; 41.16 short tons)
- Fuel type: Diesel
- Prime mover: Cummins VT12-825
- Engine type: V12 diesel
- Generator: 2 x Brush 250 horsepower (190 kW)
- Traction motors: T class: Brush 550 hp (410 kW); TA class: Brush 600 hp (450 kW)
- Cylinders: 12
Performance figures
- Maximum speed: 40 mph (64 km/h)
- Power output: 650 hp (480 kW)
- Tractive effort: 25,000 lb_{f} (110 kN) (starting); 15,460 lb_{f} (68.8 kN) (continuous)
Career
- Operators: Western Australian Government Railways
- Number in class: 15
- Numbers: T1801-T1805; TA1806-TA1815
- First run: July 1967
- Preserved: T1804, TA1807, TA1808, TA1814
- Disposition: 1 in service, 4 preserved, 10 scrapped

The T class was a class of diesel locomotives built by Tulloch Limited, Rhodes for the Western Australian Government Railways between 1967 and 1970.

== History ==
The first five members of the class were fitted with two 250 hp (190 kW) traction motors connected in parallel to a Brush 550 hp (410 kW) main generator. Two further batches of five followed; these locomotives, designated as the TA class, had uprated 600 hp (450 kW) main generators.

The first was built by Tulloch Limited with the remainder sent to Western Australia in parts and assembled locally. UGL Rail formerly used TA1813 as their shunter at Bassendean.

== Status Table ==
Key:	In Service	Preserved	Scrapped

Serial Number	Date Built	Original Number	Previous Owner/s	Current/Last Owner	Status
		T1801		Westrail	Scrapped
		T1802		Westrail	Scrapped
		T1804	WAGR/Westrail	Northampton Railway Museum	Preserved
		T1805		Westrail	Scrapped
		TA1806		Westrail	Scrapped
		TA1807	WAGR/Westrail, State Electricity Commission of Western Australia	Rail Heritage WA	Preserved
		TA1808	WAGR/Westrail	Merredin Railway Museum	Preserved
		TA1809		Westrail	Scrapped
		TA1810		Westrail	Scrapped
		TA1811		Westrail	Scrapped
		TA1812		Westrail	Scrapped
		TA1813	WAGR/Westrail, UGL Rail	Rail Heritage WA	Preserved
		TA1814	WAGR/Westrail	National Trust of Australia	Preserved
		TA1815		Westrail	Scrapped
