= HMAS Paluma (1946) =

Royal Australian Navy survey vessel (1946–1973)

History
- Name: MSL 252; HMAS Paluma
- Builder: State Dockyard, Newcastle

General characteristics
- Class & type: 120ft Motor Lighter
- Tonnage: 250 tons (as built); 340 tons (from 1958)
- Length: 120 ft (37 m)
- Beam: 24 ft (7.3 m)
- Draught: 9 ft (2.7 m)
- Propulsion: 2 x Ruston 6VCBM diesel engines

HMAS Paluma was a 340-ton survey vessel of the Royal Australian Navy between 1946 and 1973. She was designed and ordered as a 120ft Motor Lighter for the Royal Australian Navy during World War II. Built as Motor Stores Lighter (MSL 252) at State Dockyard, Newcastle, she was not completed before the end of the war.

Refitted in 1958 for survey work at Garden Island Dockyard, MSL 252 painted white of the hydrographic service, was renamed HMAS Paluma. She undertook survey work in the St Vincent Gulf of South Australia, and Papua New Guinea in 1961, rotated in survey of Papua New Guinea until 1965. She then was based at Cooktown, Queensland. While undertaking survey work of the Cooks Passage, she discovered a new barrier reef opening.

After further refits in Sydney, Paluma surveyed the route from Princess Charlotte Bay to the Torres Strait, the first survey of the route since 1890. She returned to Sydney and was decommissioned on 30 March 1973.
