= Tulloch Limited =

Defunct Australian train and ship manufacturer

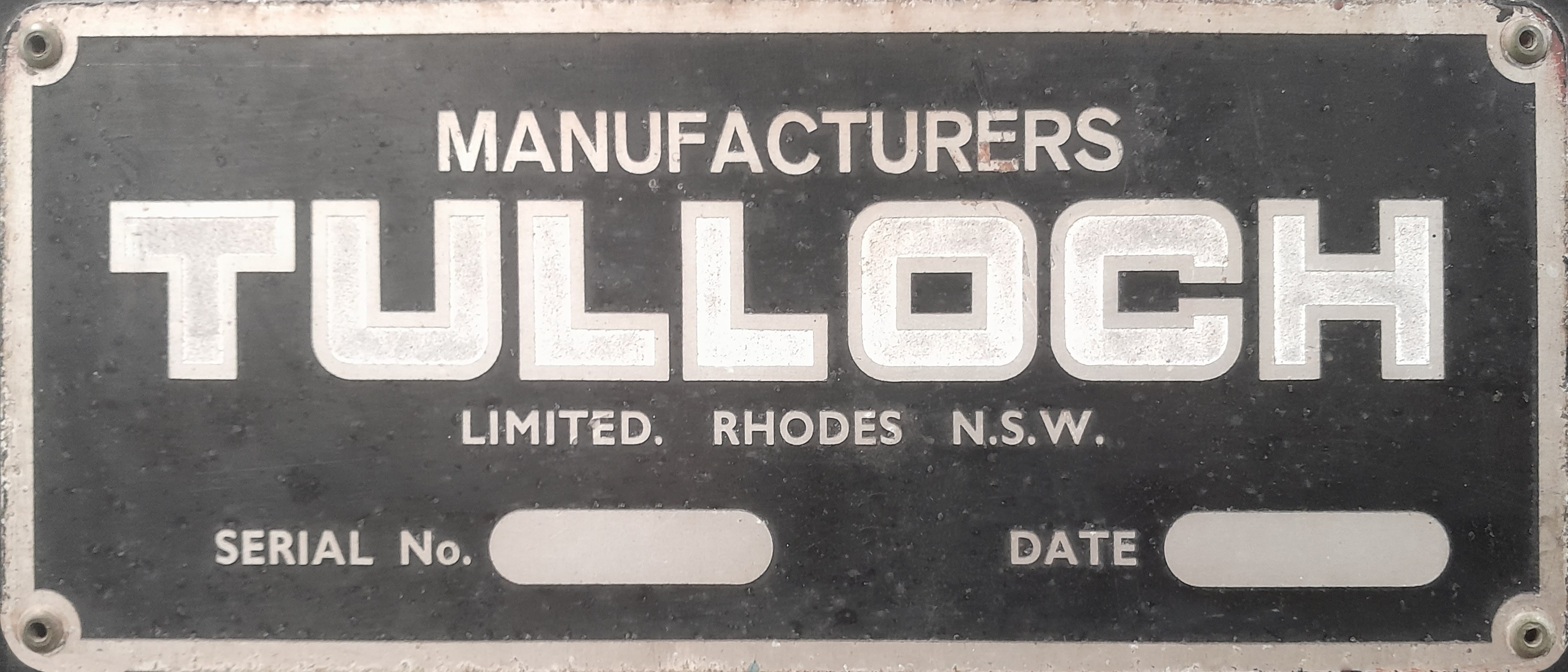
- Builder's plate on a Tulloch double-deck power car
- Industry: Engineering
- Founded: 1913
- Founder: Robert Tulloch
- Defunct: October 1974
- Headquarters: Rhodes
- Products: Railway rolling stock ships

Tulloch Limited was an Australian engineering and railway rolling stock manufacturer, located at Rhodes, New South Wales.

== History ==
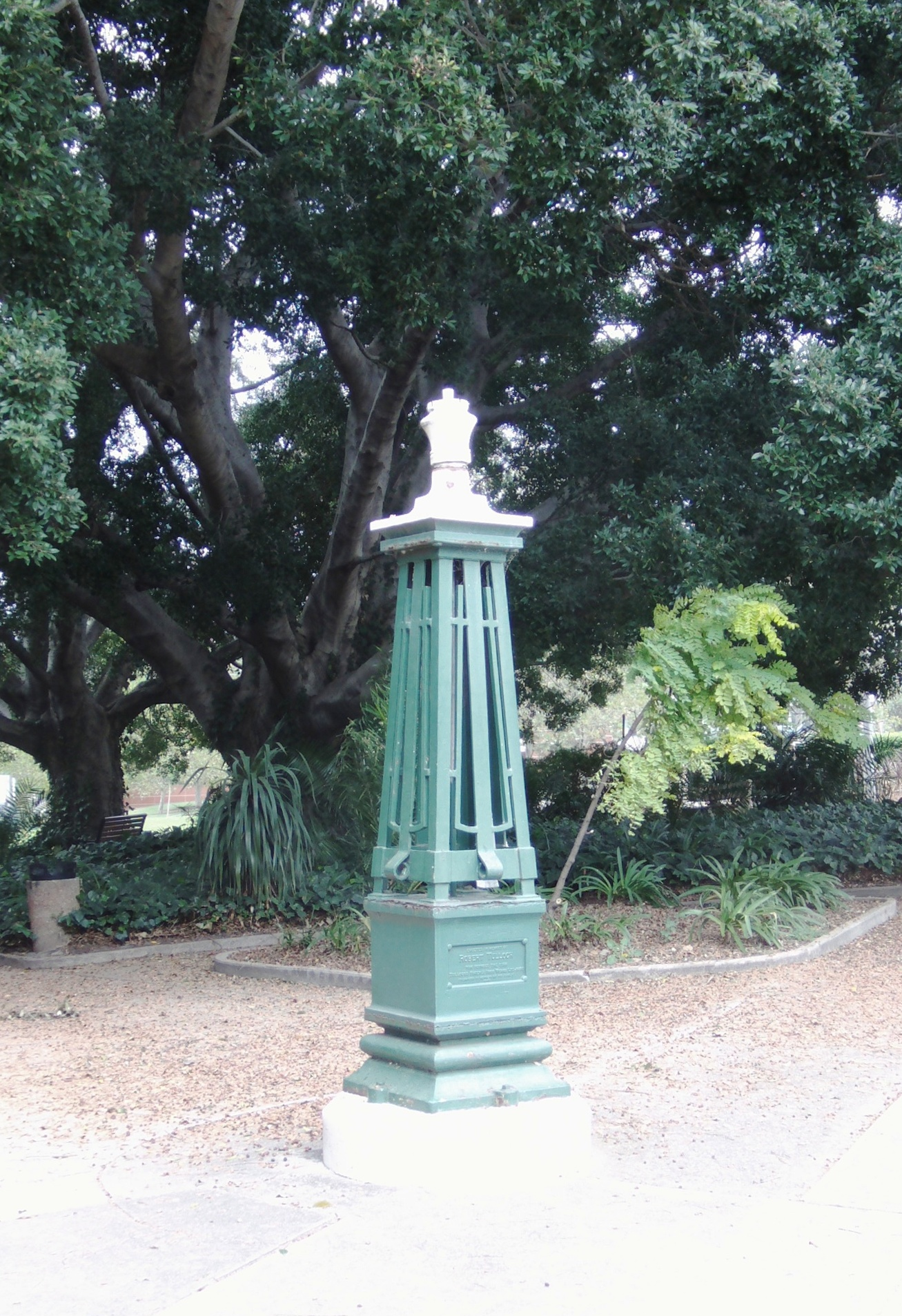
Memorial to Robert Tulloch presented by members of his family in 1945

In 1885, Robert Tulloch founded Phoenix Iron Works in Pyrmont. In 1913 the business was incorporated as Tulloch's Phoenix Iron Works and relocated to Rhodes. It primarily built freight wagons for the New South Wales Government Railways but also built single deck electric carriages for the Sydney suburban network from 1926 until the 1957. During World War II, a number of boats were built for the Royal Australian Navy including some 120ft Motor Lighters. In April 1948 the first of four seven-carriage HUB sets was delivered.

In the 1950s, it commenced building locomotives with 27 Victorian Railways W class diesel hydraulic shunters and 13 Commonwealth Railways NT class diesel locomotives delivered.

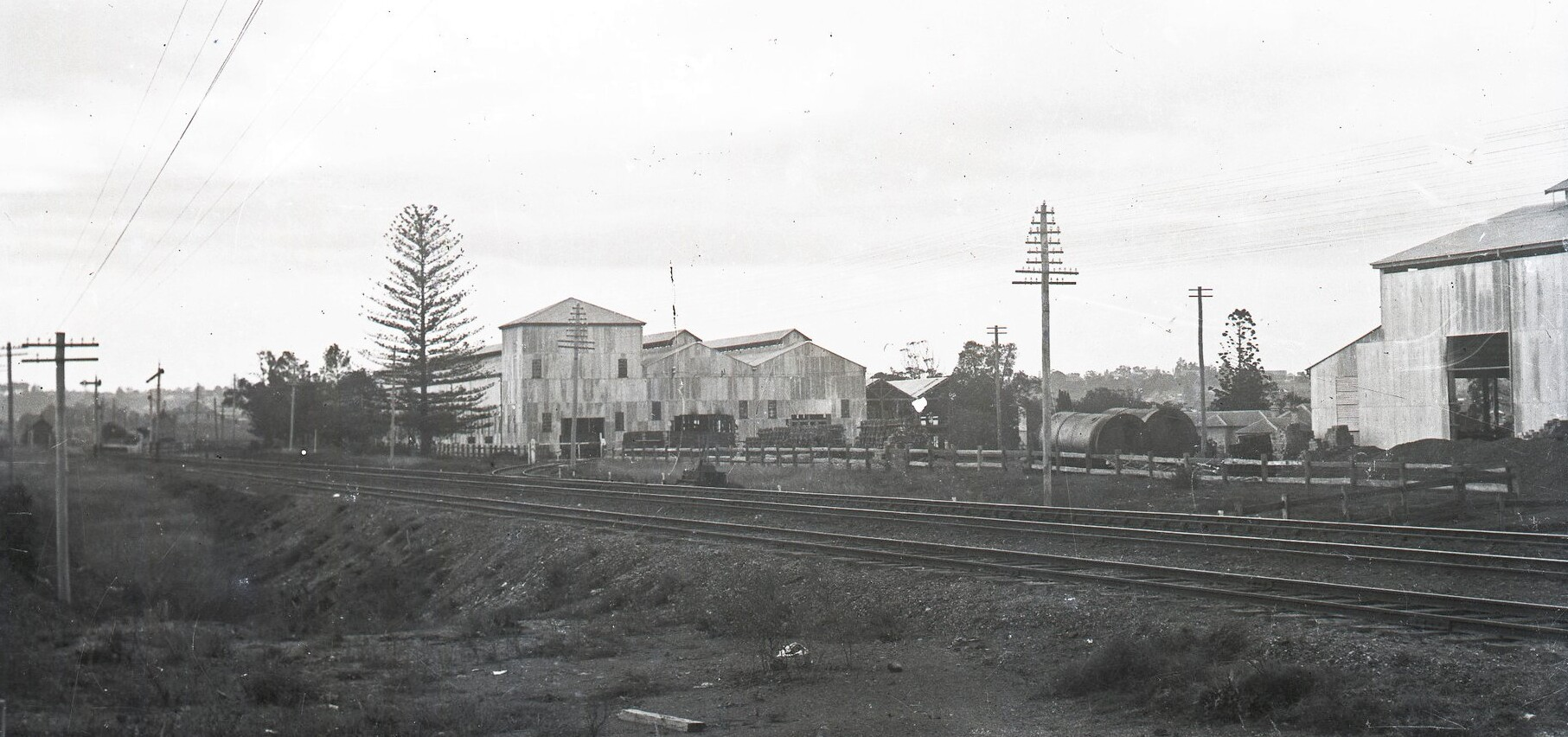
The Tulloch workshops at Rhodes during the 1910s

In 1964, Tulloch delivered the first double-decker trailer cars for use in Sydney. After the success of the trailers, Tulloch built four experimental double-decker power cars in 1968, each with electrical equipment from four different manufacturers: English Electric, Toshiba, Hitachi and Mitsubishi, the latter being selected as the supplier for the S class double decker power cars. These four motor cars were each paired with modified matching trailers from the original fleet of 120, and ran as an 8-car set with the target plate S10, giving NSW the first fully double deck Electric Multiple Unit passenger train in the world.

In the 1970s, the company built 10 New South Wales 1200 class railcars and 2 Victorian Railways DRC class railcars. In October 1974, Tullochs ceased trading. The Rhodes Corporate Park has been built on the former site.

In 1988, Skitube acquired a diesel-mechanical locomotive built by Tulloch in 1958 for use as a depot shunter. This small locomotive was believed to have been the first to be built at the Tulloch plant at Rhodes.

== Products ==
Vehicles manufactured by Tulloch Limited include:

Type	Image	Number	Entered service	Withdrawn	Notes
Single Deck Carriages		203	1940	1993	
HUB type carriage stock		27	1948	2000	
Victorian Railways W class		27	1959	?	
71 class locomotive		1	1960	1961	Converted to W266
Lake Margaret Tram		1	?	?	
WAGR T class		15	1970	N/A	
NT class		13	?	c1980	
Double Deck Carriages		120 trailers 4 motors	1964 (trailers) 1969 (motors)	2004 (trailers) 1976 (motors)	Cars in red sets withdrawn by 1993 Motor cars fitted with equipment from different companies.
1200 class railcars		10	1971	1993	
DRC class railcars		4	1971	?	Converted from 1200 railcars
South Maitland Railway railcars		3	1961	?	All scrapped
