= New South Wales 70 class locomotive =

New South Wales 70 class
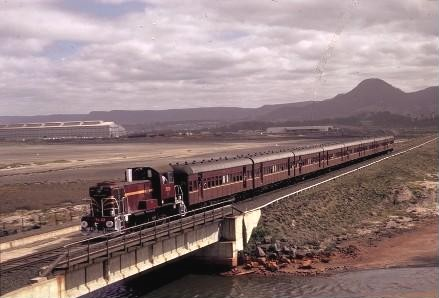
- 7002 hauls an enthusiast's special towards the Inner Harbour at Port Kembla in September 1967
Type and origin
- Power type: Diesel-hydraulic
- Builder: Commonwealth Engineering, Granville
- Build date: 1960–1961
- Total produced: 10
Specifications
- Configuration
  - UIC: C
- Gauge: 4 ft 8 1/2 in (1,435 mm) standard gauge
- Wheel diameter: 48 in (1,219 mm)
- Wheelbase: 14 ft 6 in (4.42 m)
- Length: Over headstocks: 30 ft 6 in (9.30 m), Over coupler pulling faces: 33 ft 4 in (10.16 m)
- Width: 9 ft 0 in (2.74 m)
- Height: 14 ft 0 in (4.27 m)
- Axle load: 16 long tons 0 cwt (35,800 lb or 16.3 t)
- Loco weight: 48 long tons 0 cwt (107,500 lb or 48.8 t)
- Fuel type: Diesel
- Fuel capacity: 400 imp gal (1,800 L; 480 US gal)
- Lubricant cap.: Engine: 71 imp gal (320 L; 85 US gal), Transmission: 60 imp gal (270 L; 72 US gal), Final drive: 11 imp gal (50 L; 13 US gal)
- Coolant cap.: 104 imp gal (470 L; 125 US gal)
- Sandbox cap.: 3.5 cu ft (0.099 m^{3})
- Prime mover: Caterpillar D397
- RPM range: 550–1300
- Engine type: Four-stroke V12 diesel
- Aspiration: Turbocharged
- Cylinders: 12
- Cylinder size: 5.75 in × 8 in (146 mm × 203 mm)
- Transmission: Voith L37zUb, with Deutsche Getriebe GmbH SWB37z-2 final drive
Performance figures
- Maximum speed: Low ratio: 22 mph (35 km/h); High ratio: 40 mph (64 km/h)
- Power output: Gross: 580 hp (430 kW); For traction: 550 hp (410 kW)
- Tractive effort: Continuous: 25,300 lbf (112.54 kN) at 6 mph (9.7 km/h)
Career
- Operators: NSW Department of Railways
- Number in class: 10
- Numbers: 7001–7010
- First run: 16 August 1960
- Retired: 11 September 1986
- Preserved: 7003, 7006, 7007, 7008, 7010
- Disposition: 5 preserved, 5 scrapped

The 70 class were a class of diesel-hydraulic locomotives built by Commonwealth Engineering, Granville for the New South Wales Department of Railways in 1960–61. They were ordered to replace steam locomotives at Port Kembla.

== Delivery ==
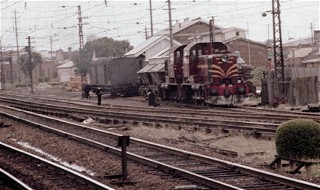
7002 and 7004 shunt at Rockdale in 1965

Designated the 70-class, the first was delivered on 15 August 1960. After weighing, the unit worked a 400-ton test load to Botany the following day. As the new servicing facilities at Port Kembla were not then complete, 7001 was temporarily allocated to Delec Locomotive Depot and worked local services. On 28 September 1960 7001 worked its first passenger train, a railway employees' train from Sydney Central to Chullora Railway Workshops.

By the end of 1960, a further three of the class had been delivered. On two occasions in 1961, 7003 ventured out on to the Richmond line with the afternoon passenger train from the Abattoirs line.

Whilst the remaining units had been delivered by May 1961, 7007 was not accepted until February 1962. Multiple unit 70s became regular visitors on the Camden railway line prior to its closure, working coal trains from Narellan.

== Modifications ==
Around the end of 1962, defects became apparent. Coupling rods were snapping when the locomotives were travelling at speed. Commencing in February 1963, the problem was rectified by fitting heavier duty side rods. The original side cab-windows were replaced from January 1963. The exhaust stacks were modified from January 1967.

== The Snowy Mountains Connection ==
Possibly the most unusual duty allotted to the class was the working of the new Interstate Profile train during the latter part of 1963. It worked from Sydney to Albury, Cooma, Tumut, Picton-Mittagong Loop line, Moss Vale to Unanderra, thence to Sydney and to Casino. Tumut and Cooma were included in the schedule as large profile loads were common to these destinations during the construction of the Snowy Mountains Scheme.

== Move to Port Kembla ==
By early July 1963, three had moved at Thirroul Railway Depot for crew training. They operated transfer workings within the Illawarra district and shunting duties at Port Kembla North.

In December 1963, instruction classes on the new locomotives commenced in two railway carriages at Port Kembla station. From 27 December, four 70 class were rostered for shunting duties on the wharves and in the commercial areas. On 1 January 1964, 7003 was the first locomotive to enter the new Port Kembla depot with all ten having arrived by the end of the month. Usually only seven units would be rostered at any one time. Spare locomotives would be loaned to Thirroul if required.

== Work at Port Kembla ==
With the construction of the new Inner Harbour at Port Kembla and its associated branch from Coniston completed in October 1953, there was a transfer of coal loading operations to that facility. Furthermore, there was a decline of during the early part of 1964 on the old commercial network.

Additional duties for the 70 class were found as shunters in Port Kembla North Yard, transfer workings to the Australian Iron & Steel Exchange sidings at Cringila and even shunting passenger carriages at Wollongong station.

== Varied Colours ==
All locomotives were issued to traffic in the standard colour scheme of Indian Red with chrome lining. In July 1982, 7006 was repainted in the short-lived reverse colour scheme and in April 1983, 7007 was repainted in the candy colour scheme.

== Demise ==
By early 1984, the use of the 70 class on the Port Kembla industrial network was at an all-time low. Only one or two were needed for the day shift. A further three would be occupied on shunting duties at Port Kembla North, with perhaps two more on transfer work.

On 10 February 1984, 7009 was taken out of traffic and sent to Eveleigh Railway Workshops with 7008 following on 21 June 1984 and 7002 on 13 August 1984, all three were officially withdrawn. On 12 September 1984, 7007 failed and was set aside at Port Kembla, to be joined by 7010 in June 1985. 7003 was subsequently withdrawn after a wheel sheared off.

In 1985, 7008 was purchased by the Dorrigo Steam Railway & Museum while 7002 and 7009 were both scrapped at Sims Metal, Mascot.

On 12 November 1984, 73 class took over all shunting and transfer duties at Port Kembla. Three 70 class were to be kept operational and the remainder kept spare. By early September 1986, only two locomotives were available for local working, 7006 and 7010. On 10 September 1986, 7010 last operated and 7006 the following day.

Of the locomotives remaining at Port Kembla, 7001, 7004 and 7005 were all sold to Sims Metal for scrap. The Emu Bay Railway, Tasmania purchased 7003 for spares and the Dorrigo Steam Railway & Museum 7007 and 7010. The New South Wales Rail Transport Museum's (NSW Rail Museum) Illawarra branch purchased 7006. This locomotive was previously on loan to the Powerhouse Museum but was returned to Thirlmere for an overhaul and is currently the shunter at Thirlmere.
