= South Coast railway line =

South Coast railway line may refer to:

- Gold Coast railway line, railway line in Australia between Brisbane and the Gold Coast
- South Coast Line, train service in Australia operated by Sydney Trains between Sydney and Nowra
- South Coast railway line, New South Wales, railway line in Australia between Sydney and Nowra
- South Coast railway line, Queensland, closed railway line in Australia operated by Queensland Railways on the Gold Coast until 1964
