= Port Kembla =

Port Kembla may refer to:

- Port Kembla, New South Wales
  - Port Kembla harbour, a cargo port
  - Port Kembla railway station
  - Port Kembla North railway station
  - Port Kembla Blacks, a rugby league club
- SS Port Kembla, a steamship 1910–1917
