= Coalcliff railway station =

Railway station in New South Wales, Australia

Coalcliff
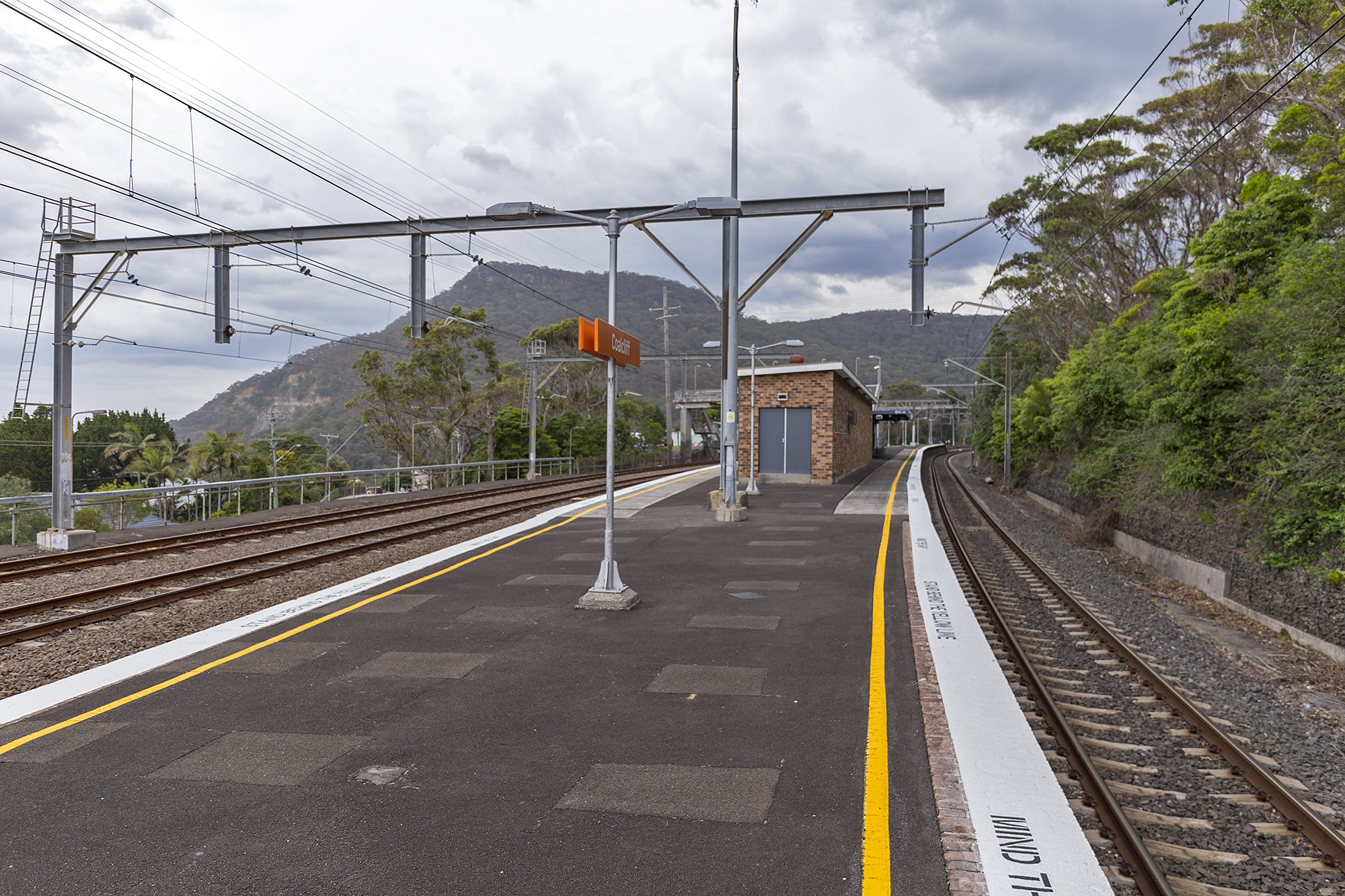
- Southbound view from Platform 2, October 2018

General information
- Location: Lawrence Hargrave Drive, Coalcliff; Australia
- Elevation: 74 metres (243 ft)
- Owner: Transport Asset Manager of New South Wales
- Operator: Sydney Trains
- Line: South Coast
- Distance: 59.27 kilometres (36.83 mi) from Central
- Platforms: 2 (1 island)
- Tracks: 4

Construction
- Structure type: Ground

Other information
- Station code: CCF
- Website: Transport for NSW

History
- Opened: August 1920

Passengers
- 2023: 10,170 (yearly); 28 (daily) (Sydney Trains, NSW TrainLink)

Services
Preceding station	Intercity Trains	Following station
Scarborough towards Kiama or Port Kembla	South Coast Line	Stanwell Park towards Central or Bondi Junction
Location

Coalcliff railway station is located on the South Coast railway line in New South Wales, Australia. It serves the seaside village of Coalcliff opening in August 1920. A yard exists south of the station for the Illawarra Coke Company's Coalcliff Cokeworks. Although rail transport had ceased some time prior, the cokeworks remained open until mid-2013. A passing loop to the east of the station remains in use. South of the station the double line becomes single to pass through Coalcliff Tunnel.

== Platforms and services ==
Coalcliff has one island platform with two faces and is serviced by Sydney Trains South Coast line services travelling between Waterfall and Port Kembla. Some peak hour and late night services operate to Sydney Central, Bondi Junction and Kiama.

Platform	Line	Stopping pattern	Notes
1	SCO	services to Waterfall peak hour, late night & weekend services to Sydney Central & Bondi Junction	
2	SCO	services to Thirroul & Port Kembla peak hour, late night & weekend services to Kiama	
