= Lysaghts railway station =

Railway station in New South Wales, Australia

Lysaghts
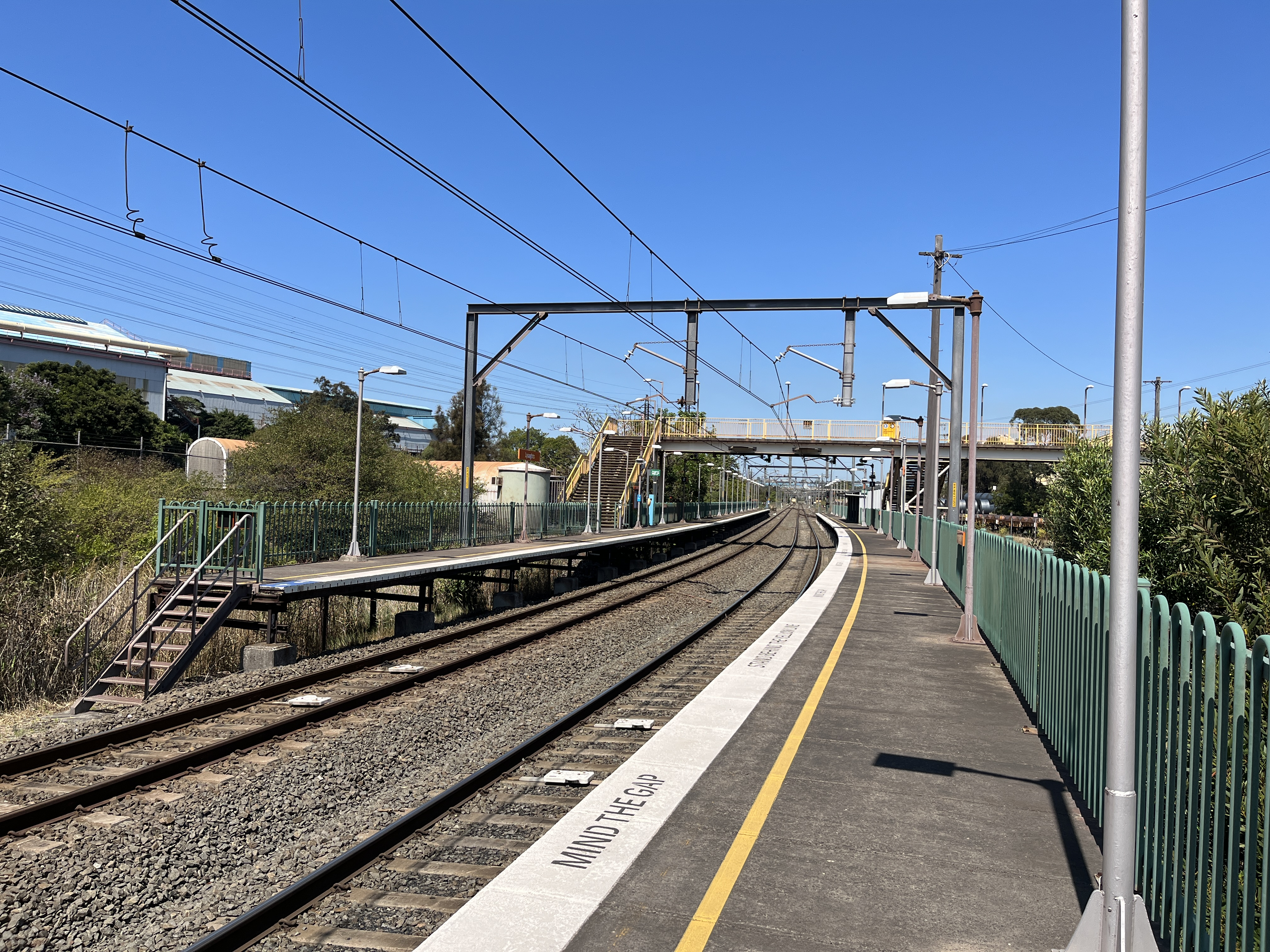
- Southbound view from Platform 1 in September 2023

General information
- Location: Springhill Road, Spring Hill; New South Wales; Australia
- Coordinates: 34.4535°S 150.8759°E
- Elevation: 5 metres (16 ft)
- Owner: Transport Asset Manager of New South Wales
- Line: Port Kembla railway line
- Distance: 86.267 kilometres (53.604 mi) from Central
- Platforms: 2 (side), 134 and 150 metres
- Train operators: Sydney Trains

Construction
- Structure type: At-grade
- Accessible: Not accessible

Other information
- Website: Transport for NSW

History
- Opened: 30 May 1938; 88 years ago
- Electrified: 4 February 1986; 40 years ago

Passengers
- 2023: <500 (year) (daily); <1 (daily) (Sydney Trains, NSW TrainLink)

Services
Preceding station	Intercity Trains	Following station
Cringila towards Port Kembla	South Coast Line	Coniston towards Central or Bondi Junction
Location

Lysaghts railway station is an intercity train station located in Spring Hill, New South Wales, Australia, on the South Coast railway line's Port Kembla branch. The station serves Sydney Trains travelling south to Port Kembla and north to Wollongong and Sydney. The station is surrounded on both sides by the Lysaght factory at Spring Hill. Trains only stop on request. There is no way out of the station unless commuters work at the neighbouring steelworks.

The station was one of 23 on the metropolitan rail network to record an average of fewer than one passenger per day in 2014.

== History ==
John Lysaght commenced operations in 1918, and began manufacturing galvanised steel at Spring Hill in 1936. As the Port Kembla branch line, which opened in 1916, cut through the Lysaght site, a station was established in 1938 to cater to the company's workforce. The station has minimal facilities beyond its original skillion-roofed waiting shed and a 1986 pedestrian footbridge.

== Platforms and Services ==
Platform	Line	Stopping pattern	Notes
1	SCO	services to Thirroul & Waterfall; 1 weekday morning peak & 4 weekend late night services to Bondi Junction	request stop
2	SCO	services to Port Kembla	request stop
