= Cringila railway station =

Railway station in New South Wales, Australia

Cringila
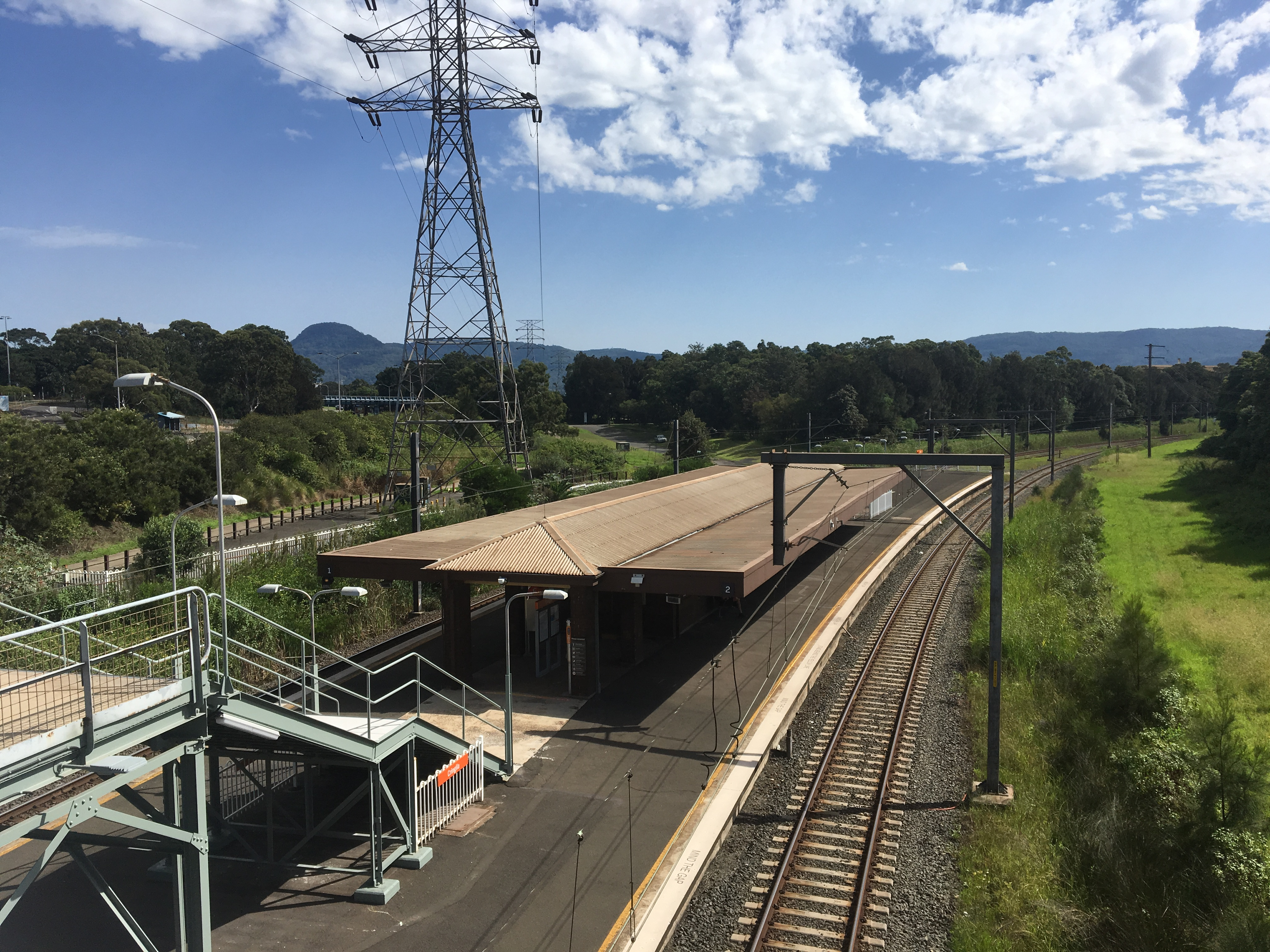
- Cringila in April 2019

General information
- Location: Five Islands Road, Cringila; New South Wales; Australia
- Coordinates: 34.4665°S 150.8780°E
- Elevation: 5 metres (16 ft)
- Owner: Transport Asset Manager of New South Wales
- Operator: Sydney Trains
- Line: Port Kembla railway line
- Distance: 87.650 kilometres (54.463 mi) from Central
- Platforms: 2 (island), 187 and 178 metres
- Train operators: Sydney Trains
- Bus operators: Premier Illawarra

Construction
- Structure type: At-grade
- Parking: Yes
- Cycle facilities: Yes
- Architectural style: Inter-war functionalism

Other information
- Website: Transport for NSW

History
- Opened: 16 April 1926; 100 years ago
- Electrified: 4 February 1986; 40 years ago

Passengers
- 2023: 8,540 (year); 23 (daily) (Sydney Trains, NSW TrainLink)

Services
Preceding station	Intercity Trains	Following station
Port Kembla North towards Port Kembla	South Coast Line	Lysaghts towards Central or Bondi Junction
Location

Cringila railway station is located in Cringila, Australia, on the South Coast railway line's Port Kembla branch. The station serves Sydney Trains travelling south to Port Kembla and north to Wollongong and Sydney.

== History ==
Though the Port Kembla district was designated as a future port and industrial area as early as 1893, satisfactory wharves were only constructed in the early 20th century. The first metalworks began production in 1908. A hamlet of workers' cottages grew up near the site of the later Port Kembla steelworks. This settlement was first known as Steeltown, but was renamed Cringila the following year, as new blast furnaces opened at the steelworks, by then Australian Iron & Steel. The area soon rivalled Newcastle as a centre for the state's steel industry. The railway from the main South Coast line to the new port was completed in July 1916, and a single-platform station followed at Cringila six years later.

Australia's entry into World War II dramatically increased its demand for steel, and the Port Kembla branch line was duplicated in 1940. A new island-platform Cringila station, in the inter-war functionalist style, opened the following year. The dichromatic brick platform building, built to a similar plan as was used for Cronulla line stations, features a toilet, general waiting room, staff room, goods store, stationmaster's office, combined booking and parcels office, and ticket office. The building is considered a good example of its type, being externally intact, and has been listed on the local heritage register. The station footbridge was extended in 1958 to provide a direct connection to the adjacent BHP (now BlueScope) steelworks.

== Platforms and services ==
Cringila has one platform with two faces. It is serviced by Sydney Trains South Coast line services travelling between Waterfall and Thirroul to Port Kembla. One weekday morning and four weekend late night services go to Bondi Junction.

Platform	Line	Stopping pattern	Notes
1	SCO	services to Thirroul & Waterfall; 1 weekday morning peak & 4 weekend late night services to Bondi Junction	
2	SCO	services to Port Kembla	

== Transport links ==
Premier Illawarra operates three bus routes via Cringila station, under contract to Transport for NSW:

- 34: Wollongong to Port Kembla
- 51: University of Wollongong to Albion Park
- 53: University of Wollongong to Stockland Shellharbour
