= Coniston railway station, New South Wales =

Railway station in New South Wales, Australia

Coniston
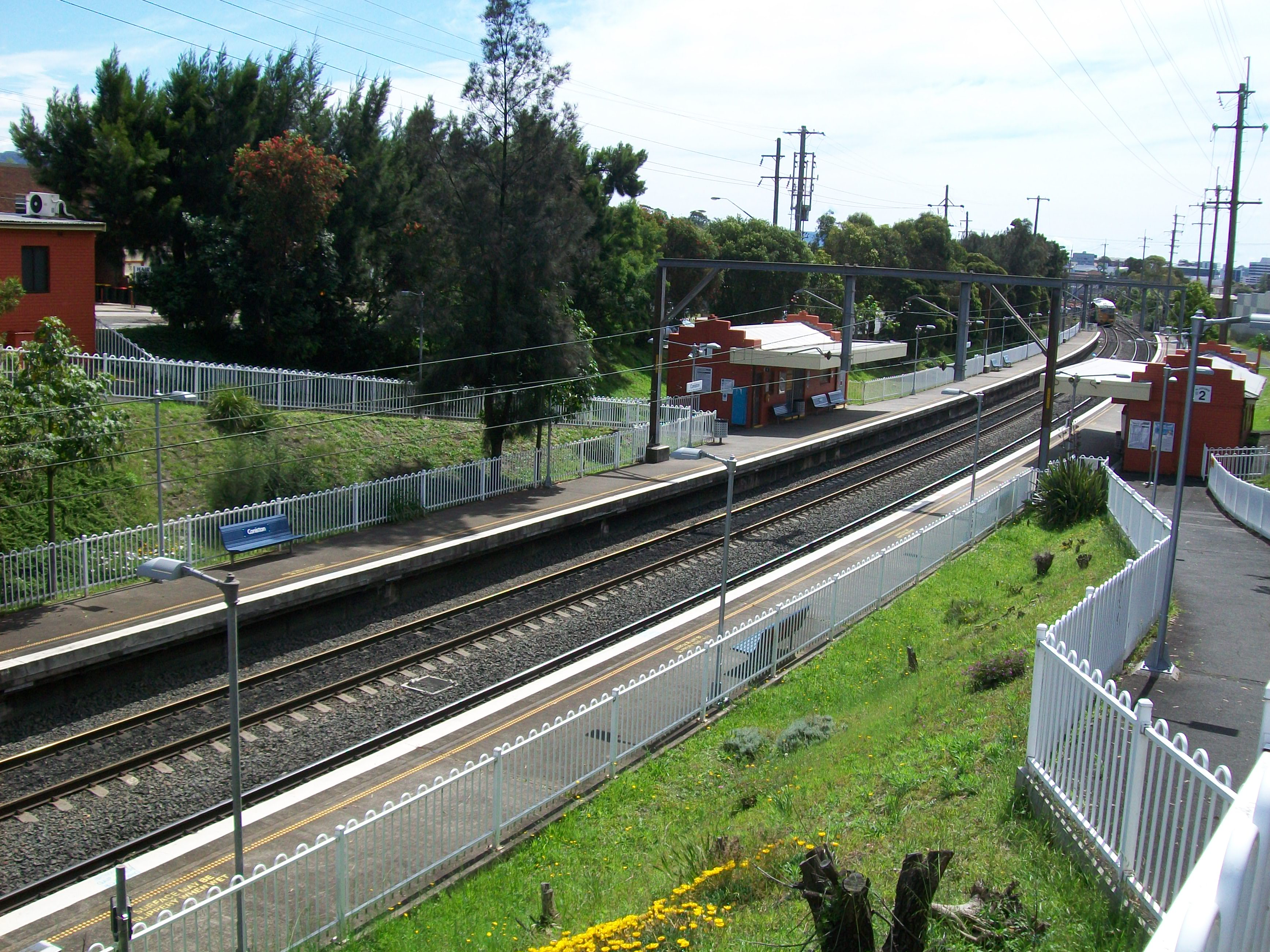
- Platforms in 2008

General information
- Location: Gladstone Avenue, Coniston; New South Wales; Australia
- Coordinates: 34.4380°S 150.8850°E
- Elevation: 19 metres (62 ft)
- Owner: Transport Asset Manager of New South Wales
- Operator: Sydney Trains
- Line: South Coast
- Distance: 84.097 kilometres (52.255 mi) from Central
- Platforms: 2 (side), 132 metres (433 ft) and 139 metres (456 ft)
- Train operators: Sydney Trains
- Bus operators: Premier Illawarra

Construction
- Structure type: At-grade
- Parking: 68 spaces
- Cycle facilities: Yes
- Architectural style: Inter-war functionalism

Other information
- Status: Weekdays: Staffed: 5.35am to 9.35am, 2pm to 6pm: Weekends and public holidays: Staffed: Unstaffed
- Website: Transport for NSW

History
- Opened: 1 April 1916; 110 years ago
- Rebuilt: 20 May 1941; 85 years ago
- Electrified: 4 February 1986; 40 years ago
- Former names: Mount Drummond (1916–1923)

Passengers
- 2023: 113,660 (year); 311 (daily) (Sydney Trains, NSW TrainLink)

Services
Preceding station	Intercity Trains	Following station
Unanderra towards Kiama	South Coast Line	Wollongong towards Central or Bondi Junction
Lysaghts towards Port Kembla	South Coast Line	Wollongong towards Central or Bondi Junction
Location

Coniston railway station is a heritage-listed railway station located in Coniston, New South Wales, Australia, on the South Coast railway line. The station serves Sydney Trains travelling south to Port Kembla or Kiama and north to Wollongong and Sydney.

== History ==
The district south of central Wollongong began to develop as an industrial area at the beginning of the 20th century. In 1916, the NSW Government Railways opened a branch line from the main South Coast line south of Wollongong to the new wharves at Port Kembla. The branch's sole passenger station was Mount Drummond, but it closed in 1923, reopening as Coniston in 1925. A "Coniston Station Estate" surrounding the station, consisting of industrial and residential allotments, was subdivided in 1939. The branch line assumed increased significance with Australia's entry into World War II, with a dramatic increase in steel production prompting the Railways to duplicate the line from Wollongong to Cringila. The original Coniston station was demolished in 1941 and replaced with a new two-platform station at its present-day, main line location.

The new station included three single-storey buildings: a ticket office at street level on Gladstone Avenue, and two identical platform buildings containing a waiting room and toilets. The buildings were constructed in the functionalist style from dichromatic brick using iron oxide and clinker bricks with soldier courses. The platform buildings feature distinctive Art Deco style vertical "fins" extending above the awnings at both ends. While all three buildings remain today, the exteriors have been painted over and the original internal fit-outs removed. The station is deemed to have local heritage significance.

== Platforms and services ==
Coniston has two side platforms. It is serviced by Sydney Trains South Coast line services travelling between Sydney Central, Bondi Junction and Kiama, as well as local services from Waterfall and Thirroul to Port Kembla.

Platform	Line	Stopping pattern	Notes
1	SCO	services to Thirroul, Waterfall, Sydney Central & Bondi Junction	
2	SCO	services to Port Kembla & Kiama	

== Transport links ==
Premier Illawarra operates one bus route via Coniston station, under contract to Transport for NSW:

- 11: Wollongong to University of Wollongong

== Gallery ==
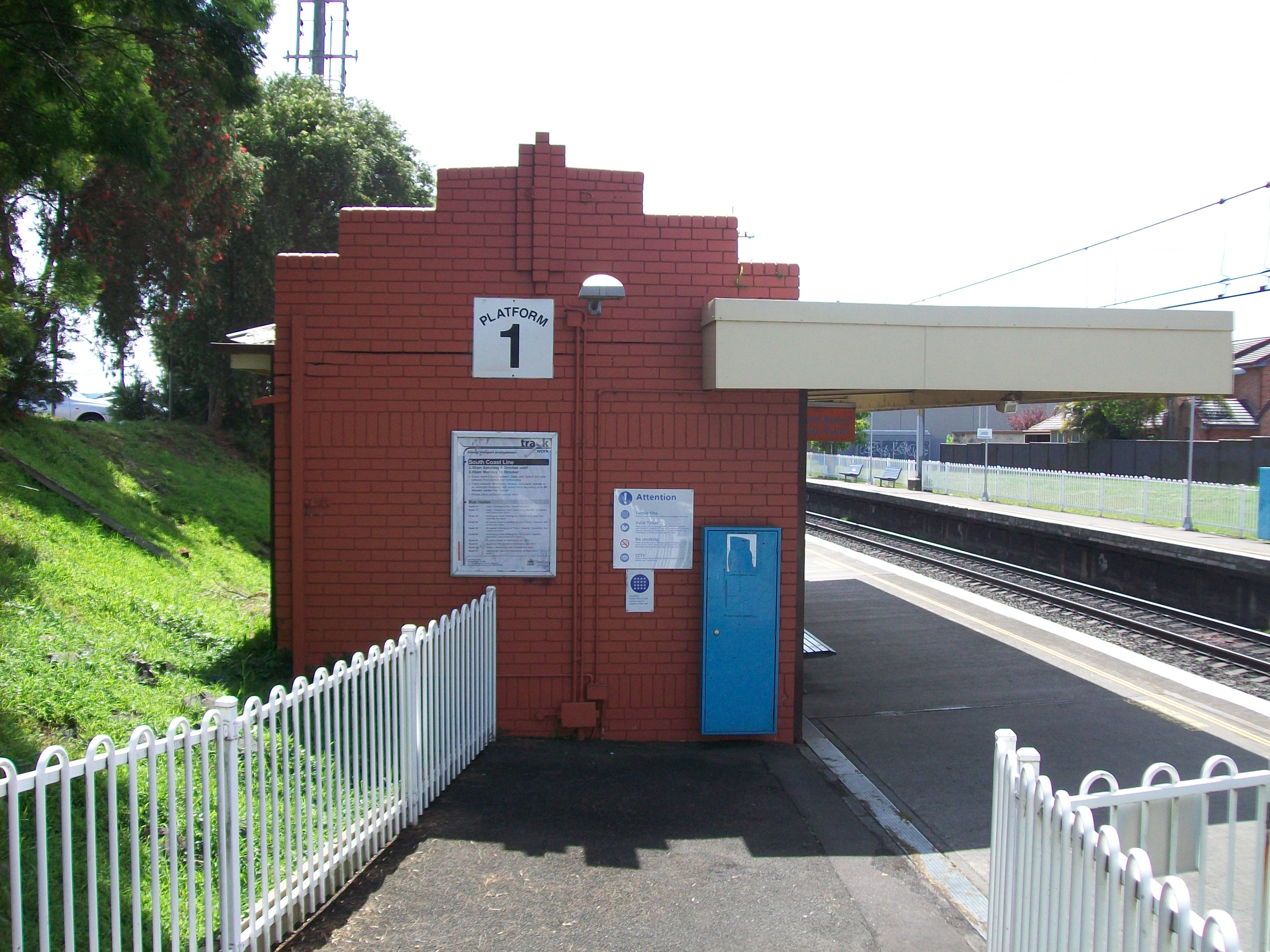
The functionalist 1941 platform buildings feature Art Deco-influenced "fins" on each end, January 2008

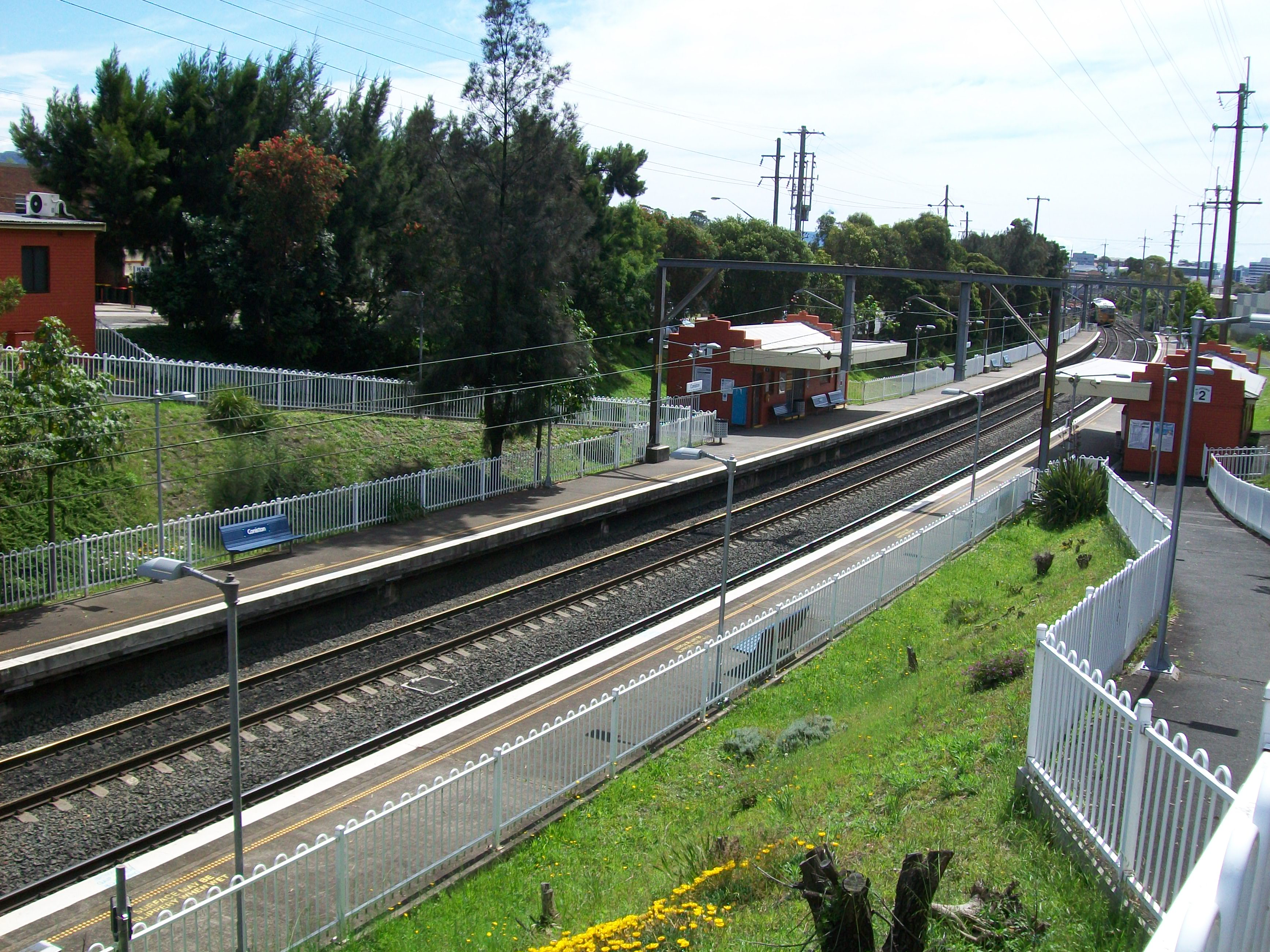
Northbound view of the station platforms from Bridge Street, January 2008
