= Port Kembla North railway station =

Railway station in New South Wales, Australia

Port Kembla North
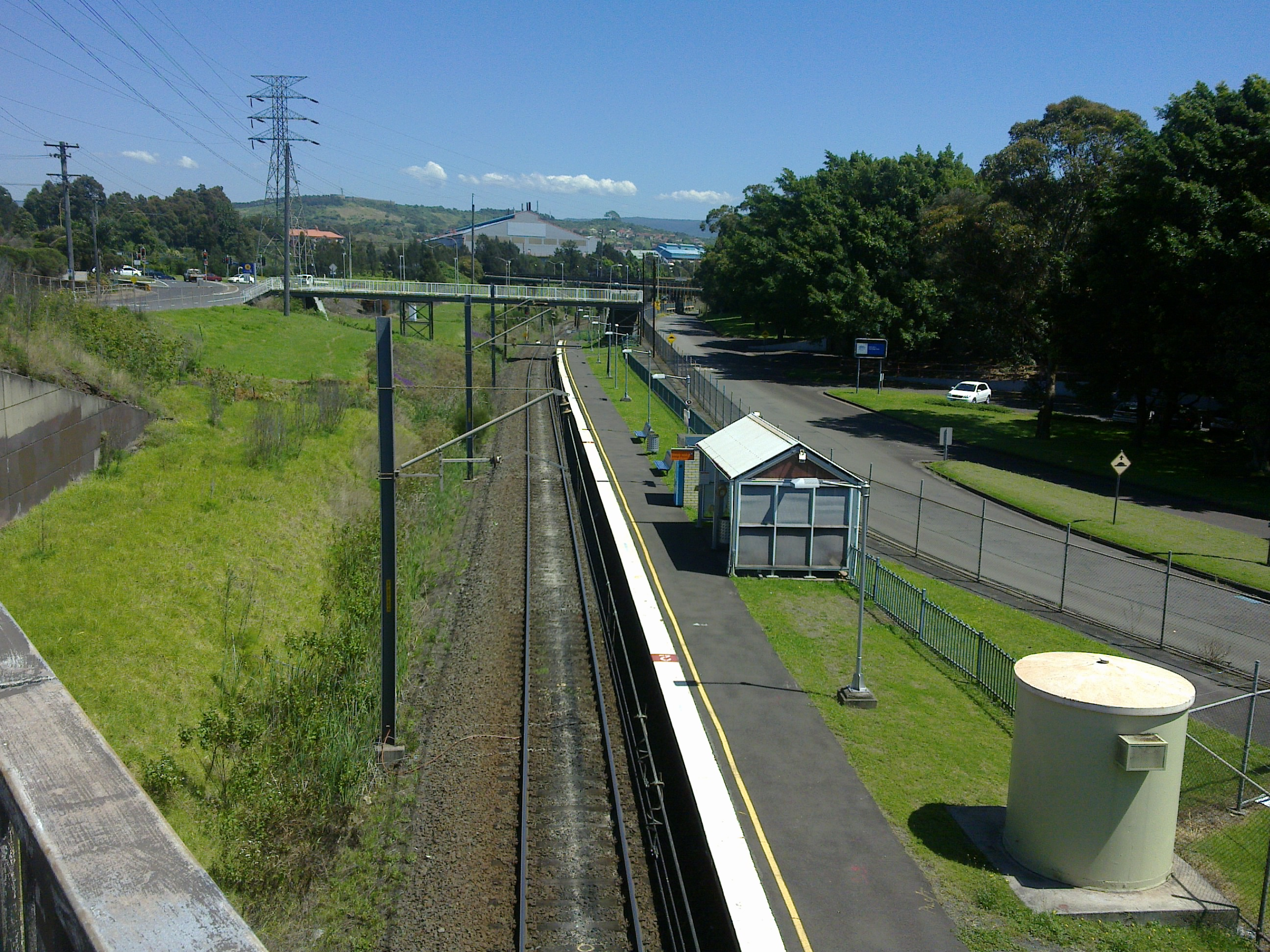
- Eastbound station footbridge view in October 2011

General information
- Location: Flinders Street, Port Kembla; New South Wales; Australia
- Coordinates: 34.4730°S 150.8881°E
- Elevation: 14 metres (46 ft)
- Owner: Transport Asset Manager of New South Wales
- Line: Port Kembla railway line
- Distance: 88.771 kilometres (55.160 mi) from Central
- Platforms: 1 (197 metres)
- Train operators: Sydney Trains

Construction
- Structure type: At-grade
- Accessible: Not accessible

Other information
- Website: Transport for NSW

History
- Opened: 9 March 1936; 90 years ago
- Electrified: 4 February 1986; 40 years ago

Passengers
- 2023: 7,410 (year); 20 (daily) (Sydney Trains, NSW TrainLink)

Services
Preceding station	Intercity Trains	Following station
Port Kembla Terminus	South Coast Line	Cringila towards Central or Bondi Junction
Location

Port Kembla North railway station is a single-platform intercity train station located in Port Kembla, Australia, on the South Coast railway line's Port Kembla branch. The station serves Sydney Trains traveling south to Port Kembla Station and north to Wollongong and Sydney. The station was one of 23 on the metropolitan rail network to record an average of fewer than one passenger per day in 2014.

== History ==
The wharves, mills and factories that today characterise Port Kembla began to develop in the early part of the 20th century. The railway from the main South Coast line to the new port was completed in July 1916, but the only station, Mount Drummond, was at the northern end. A single-platform station near the Outer Harbour, called Port Kembla, opened in January 1920. A second station for the suburb, called Port Kembla North, opened in March 1936, at the southern boundary of the vast Australian Iron & Steel site – the year after the enterprise was acquired by BHP.

The station has no platform building – save for a small waiting shed and services hut – and is not staffed. Electric multiple unit trains began to service the station from February 1986 and electronic ticketing facilities were activated in 2014.

== Platforms and Services ==
Platform	Line	Stopping pattern	Notes
1	South Coast Line	services to Port Kembla, Thirroul & Waterfall; 1 weekday morning peak & 4 weekend late night services to Bondi Junction	
