= South Coast Line =

Rail service in New South Wales, Australia

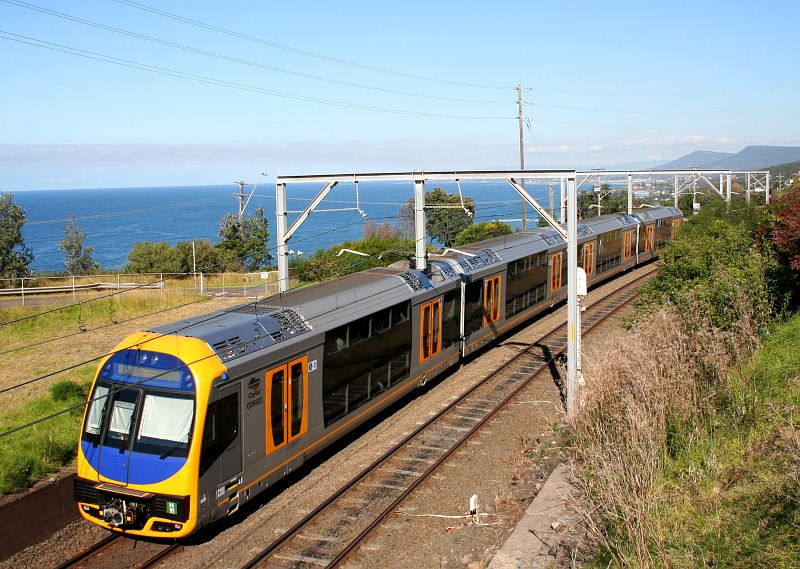
- An H set just after Scarborough

Overview
- Service type: Intercity rail
- Locale: Illawarra; South Coast
- First service: 21 June 1887; 139 years ago
- Current operator: Sydney Trains
- Website: transportnsw.info/routes/details/intercity-trains/sco/02SCO

Route
- Termini: Bondi Junction; Central; Port Kembla; Bomaderry
- Stops: 45
- Distance travelled: 166 km (103 mi)
- Lines used: Eastern Suburbs; Main Suburban (between Central and Redfern); South Coast

Technical
- Rolling stock: H set Oscar (electric services); D set Mariyung (electric services); Endeavour railcar N set (non-electric services)
- Track gauge: 1,435 mm (4 ft 8 1/2 in) standard gauge
- Electrification: to Kiama, all on the Port Kembla branch
- Track owner: Transport Asset Manager of New South Wales
- Timetable number: SCO
Route map
Sydney Trains intercity services
- Blue Mountains
- Central Coast & Newcastle
- Hunter
- South Coast
- Southern Highlands

The South Coast Line (SCO) is an intercity rail service that services the Illawarra and South Coast regions of New South Wales, Australia. The service runs from Central in Sydney, and runs the entire length of the eponymous South Coast railway line to Bomaderry. The service also runs along the Eastern Suburbs railway line at peak hours and weekends only, and the Port Kembla railway line to Port Kembla. It is operated with Mariyung D sets, Oscar H sets, with Endeavour railcar N sets operating the service on the non-electrified section between Kiama and Bomaderry.

Passenger trains first operated on the South Coast railway line in 1887, and is one of five routes on the Sydney Trains Intercity network. The South Coast Line routes span 40 stations, across 159 km (99 mi) of railway. An additional 5 stations and 7 km (4.3 mi) of railway are travelled by South Coast Line trains at peak hour on the Eastern Suburbs railway line.

== History ==
=== Stations ===
The first passenger train services on the Illawarra commenced on 21 June 1887, after the line was completed from Clifton to Wollongong, and later, North Kiama on 9 November 1887. The line was later connected to Waterfall via Helensburgh, Otford, Stanwell Park and Coalcliff the following year between July and October 1888, after delays on construction between Waterfall and Clifton. The line was further extended to Bomaderry through Kiama, opening on 2 June 1893.

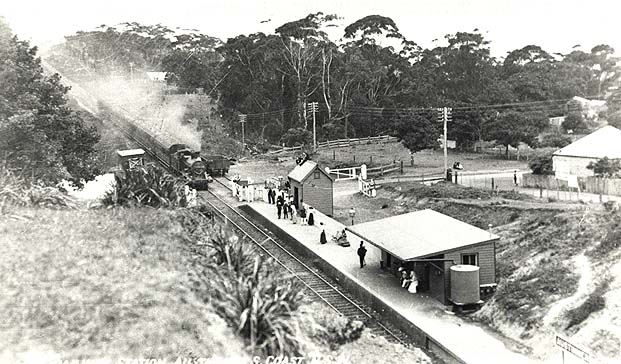
An American Suburban carriage passenger train approaches Austinmer station. (photograph dated 1914)

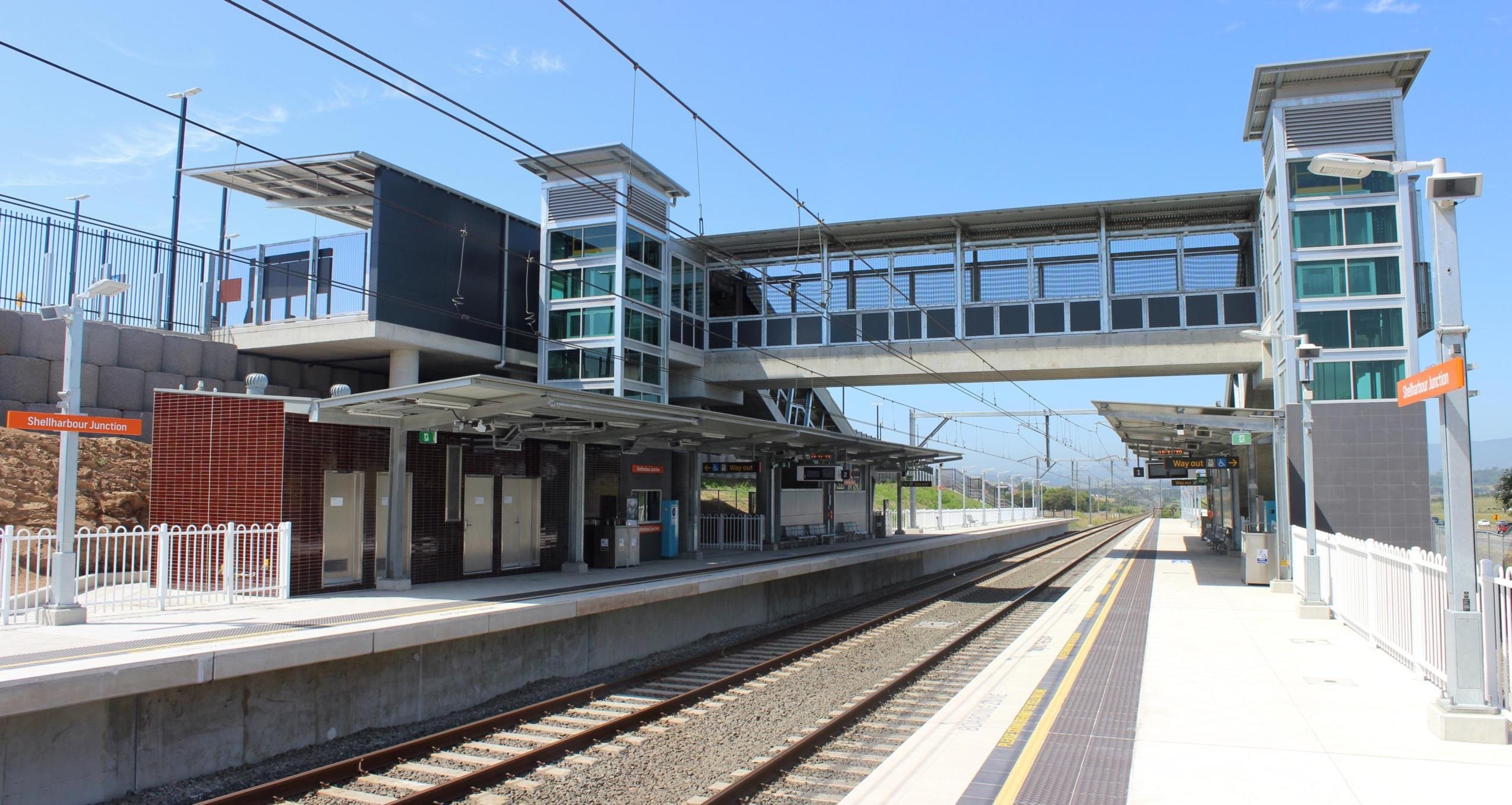
View of Shellharbour Junction station, which opened in late 2014

Throughout its long history, the South Coast Line's roster of stations has changed significantly. Many stations in the Upper Illawarra had closed and new ones opened towards the first half of the 20th century. Stations such as the ones serving Clifton were closed, along with a majority of the original railway between Waterfall and Coalcliff between 1915 and 1920, replaced with a new alignment that made use of a flatter gradient and made the infamous Otford Tunnel defunct. New stations along the line that opened throughout this period included Coledale in 1902, North Wollongong in 1915, Coniston in 1916, Wombarra in 1917, and Towradgi in 1948. Further removals of stations from the line in the latter half of the 20th century included the station serving Yallah in 1974, the majority of the stations on the line between Kiama and Bomaderry, and Lilyvale in 1983. Dunmore was also closed in November 2014, replaced by Shellharbour Junction, after rising commercial and residential development in Flinders and Shell Cove and their distance from Dunmore station, prompted the Government of New South Wales to build a replacement station closer to the area of urban growth.

While the railway network at Port Kembla was built in 1916, stations and passenger trains servicing the surrounding suburbs did not operate until 5 January 1920, when the Port Kembla railway station was opened. A station at Cringila was added to the Port Kembla commuter branch in 1926, along with one at Port Kembla North, a decade later, in 1936. A railway station for workers at Port Kembla, named Lysaghts, after the nearby Lysaght steel plant, was also opened in 1938.

Some platforms on the line (e.g. Scarborough) are only 4 or 6 cars long, so not all doors may open on 8-car trains.

=== Services and rolling stock ===
Services were originally operated with locomotive-hauled trains, and later, diesel railcars, prior to the electrification of the South Coast railway line. The line was electrified to Helensburgh in 1984, with the suburban Eastern Suburbs & Illawarra Line service occasionally extending its service past the terminus at Waterfall to Helensburgh during peak hours, a practice that the current Sydney Trains' Eastern Suburbs & Illawarra Line service still follows today. Electrification extended to Wollongong the following year. Despite the newly installed electrification, diesel sets and locomotive-hauled trains still operated along the line from Kiama all the way past Wollongong to Sydney, including the South Coast Daylight Express, until 1991. Electrification of the South Coast railway line was further extended to Dapto in 1993 and, finally, to Kiama in 2001. The railway between Kiama and Bomaderry is the only part of the line that remains non-electrified, operated by New South Wales Endeavour railcars since their introduction in 1994.

The electrified rolling stock of the South Coast Line began with V set intercity trains. There were later accompanied by Tangaras when they were introduced into the CityRail network in 1988. Originally, the Tangaras that ran on the South Coast Line were different variations of T sets known as G sets. G sets differed from T sets in that they had reversible seats, toilets, fresh water dispensers and luggage racks. In late 2005, it was discovered that a majority of the V set rolling stock operating on the South Coast Line were suffering from corrosion in their underframes. More G sets were introduced onto the South Coast Line to compensate, and eventually became the standard rolling stock on the South Coast Line after V sets ceased operating on the service. From January 2012, V sets ceased operating South Coast services. In 2009, however, after the introduction of OSCARs onto the intercity CityRail network, All G sets were recalled for conversion into T sets. The OSCAR fleet effectively replaced the G set rolling stock and, from 2010–2025, standard Sydney Trains T sets, owned by Sydney Trains, have been operating services to Port Kembla.

In 2017, it was revealed that the Liberal state government had reviewed a 3.6 billion dollar tunnel between Thirroul and Waterfall that could reduce travel time between Sydney and Wollongong by 22 minutes, but that rail improvements were being sidetracked in favour of improving and extending the nearby Princes Motorway.

=== Incidents ===
On 20 December 1994, an accident involving two empty S sets occurred during a shunting procedure at Waterfall. One of the trains jack-knifed onto the platform, demolishing the concrete pedestrian bridge. No injuries or casualties, however, were reported.

On the morning of 31 January 2003, an intercity Tangara en route to Port Kembla derailed at high speed between Waterfall and Helensburgh, resulting in the deaths of seven people and injury of forty. The accident was the third major accident resulting in fatalities on the CityRail network in 13 years, after the Cowan rail accident in 1990 and Glenbrook rail accident in 1999.

On 23 November 2011, a Pacific National coal train derailed near Clifton, causing the suspension of South Coast Line services between Waterfall and Thirroul. Services were resumed four days later, after the derailed train was removed from the tracks. The train had derailed immediately after coming out of the Clifton tunnel, with the front eight clearing the tunnel and derailing, and the rear twelve carriages remaining inside the tunnel. The Office of Transport Safety Investigations found that the cause of the derailment was a broken axle.

== Services ==
Peak hour and weekend services commence from Bondi Junction or Martin Place on the Eastern Suburbs railway line, and stop at Central at platform 25. At other times (weekday off-peak), services depart from Central (Sydney Terminal). The South Coast line runs three trains an hour during peak, and one train an hour off peak.

Some peak hour and weekend services are listed as pickup only at intermediate suburban stations (eg. Redfern, Hurstville, Sutherland). This restriction is to ensure the train does not fill up with suburban passengers, who have plenty of other suburban services to take. Pickup only stations are not displayed on platform screens, but will be displayed on in-train screens.

The most common Central to Kiama services are operated by 4 or 8 car H sets (OSCARs). All-stations services operate between Waterfall, Thirroul and Port Kembla with 4-car sets. Shuttle train services between Kiama and Bomaderry are operated by 2-car diesel Endeavour railcars, due to the line not being electrified past Kiama.

From 2026, all services are to be taken over by 4 and 6 car D sets, with 8 car consists being introduced by late 2026, and 10 car consists by 2027. This will free up H sets for transferral to suburban services. All services will terminate at Central (Sydney Terminal) and will no longer operate on the Eastern Suburbs line to Bondi Junction, due to the platforms being too short for the 10 car D sets. It is also expected that all services will no longer stop at Wolli Creek and will stop at Sydenham instead to allow the T4 suburban services to operate more efficiently and so that South Coast line trains can bypass the slower T4 suburban trains to ease congestion.

In addition, peak hour frequencies between Central and Kiama will be increased from three to four trains an hour, while off-peak frequencies will be increased from one to two trains an hour.

Two-car Endeavour sets will continue to operate the Kiama to Bomaderry section. These are set to be replaced by the R sets in 2027.

== Rolling stock ==
- New South Wales D set 4 or 8 car EMUs — (All services except the Kiama–Bomaderry shuttle)
- New South Wales H set 4 or 8-car EMUs — (All services except the Kiama–Bomaderry shuttle)
- New South Wales Endeavour Railcar N set 2-car DMUs — (Kiama–Bomaderry services)
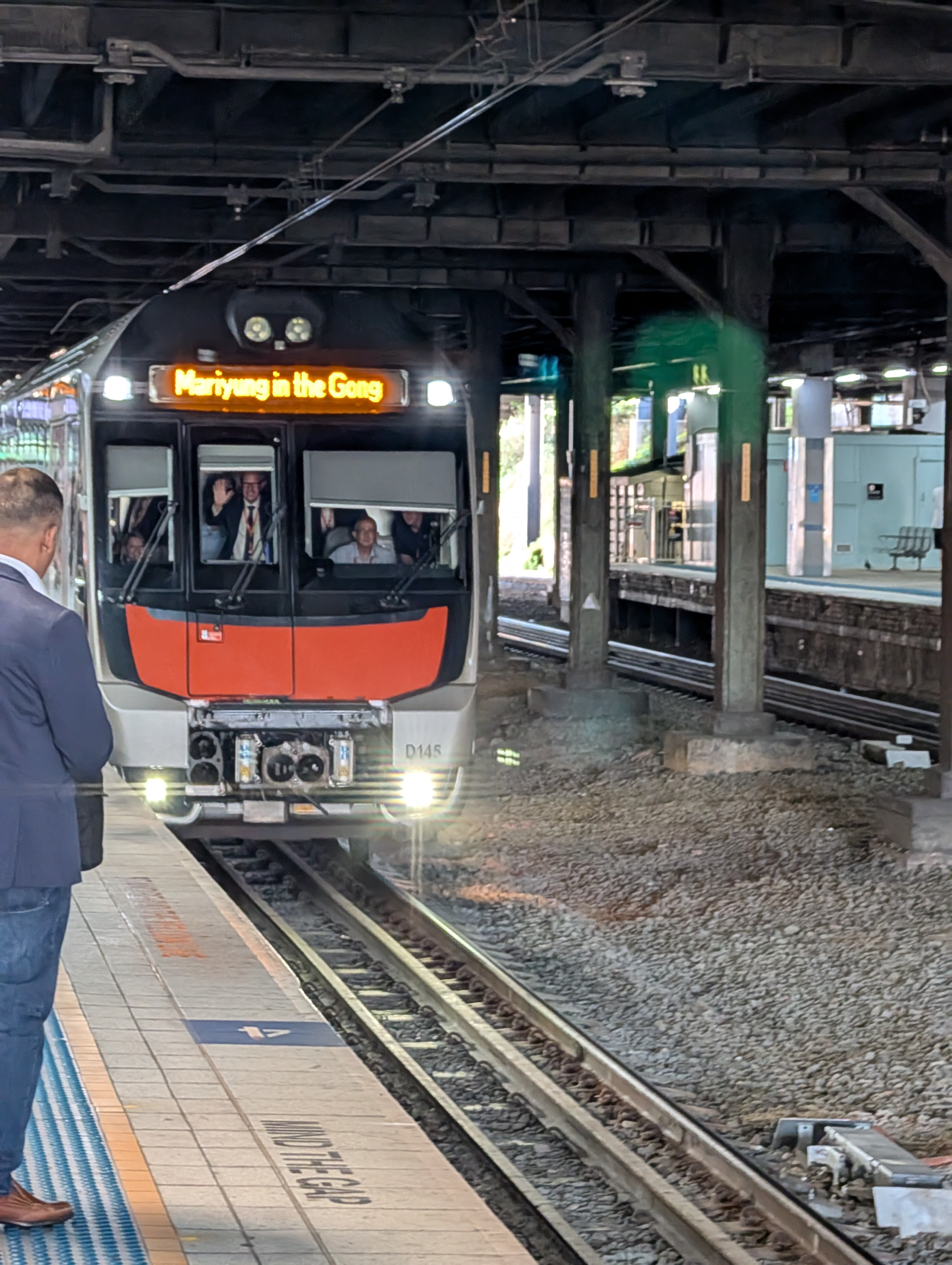
Mariyung D set

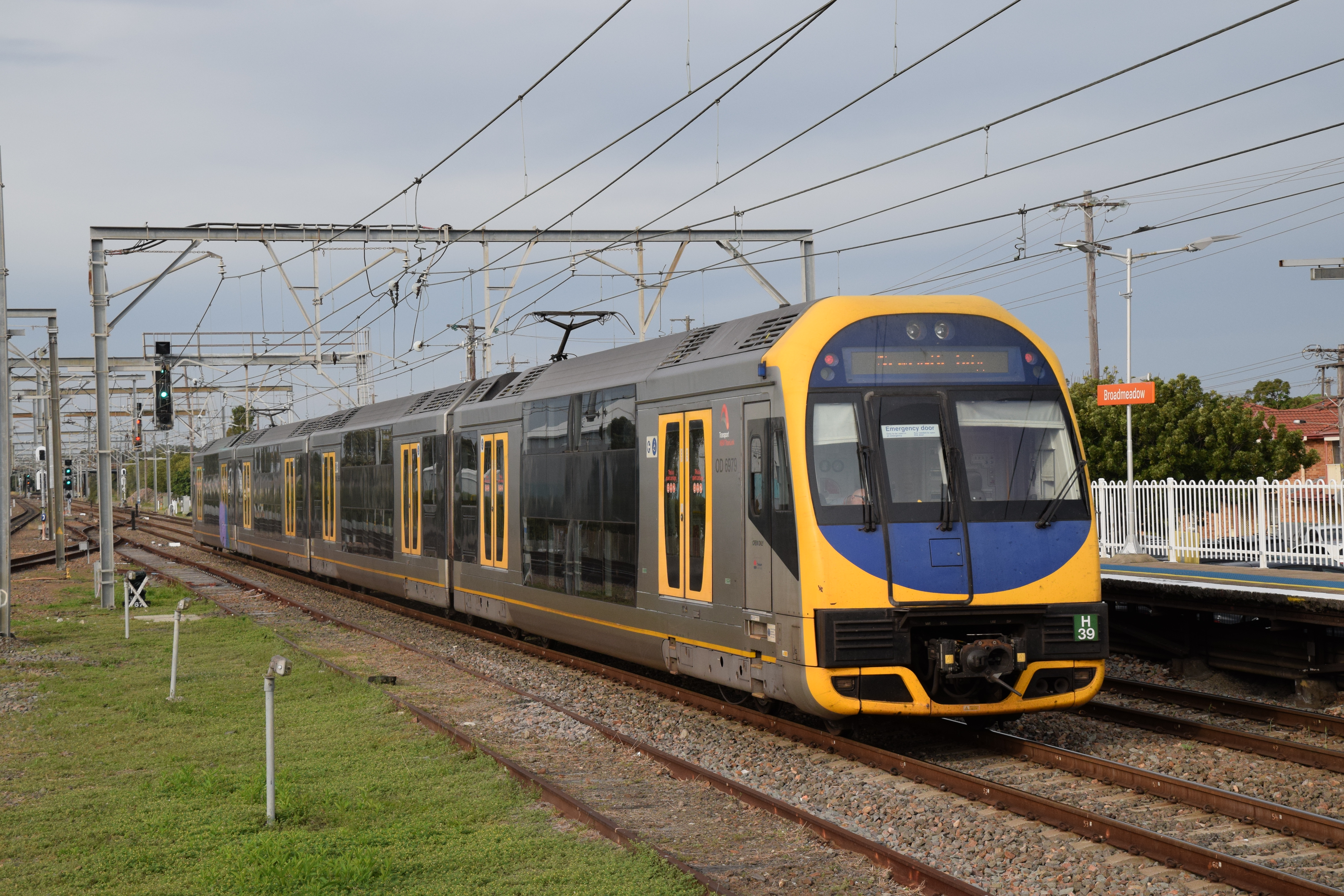
Oscar H set

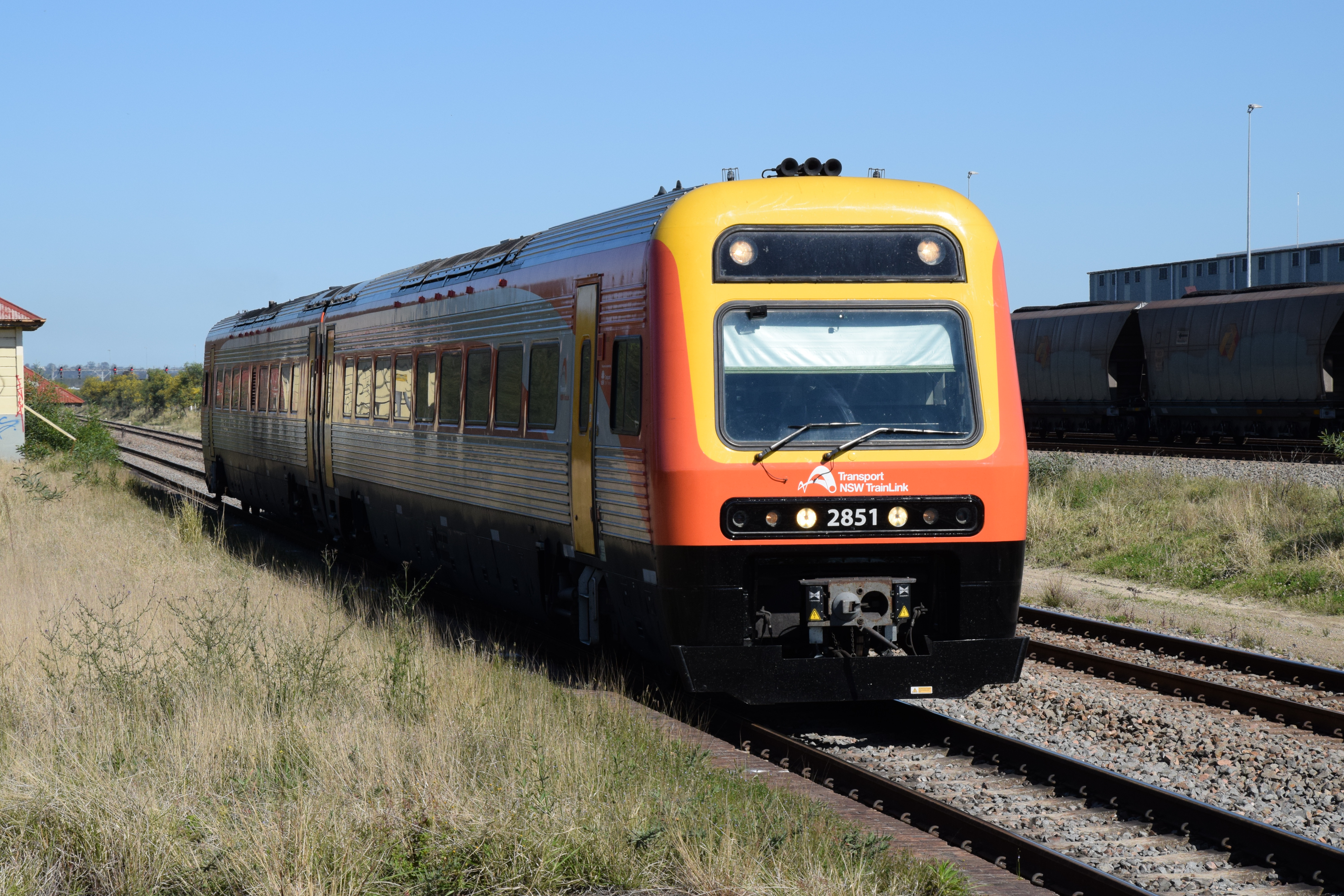
Endeavor Railcar N set

=== Future ===
- New South Wales R set 3-car DMUs — (Kiama–Bomaderry services)

=== Former ===
- New South Wales V set 4 or 8-car EMUs (1986 – January 2012)
- New South Wales T set 4 or 8-car EMUs (1993–2025)

== Patronage ==
The following table shows the patronage of each line of the NSW TrainLink Intercity network for the year ending 30 June 2026, based on Opal tap on and tap off data.

2025–26 NSW TrainLink Intercity patronage by line
Blue Mountains Line	6,634,999
Central Coast & Newcastle Line	12,765,284
Hunter Line	839,041
South Coast Line	7,445,930
Southern Highlands Line	553,390
