= Port Kembla railway station =

Railway station in New South Wales, Australia

Port Kembla
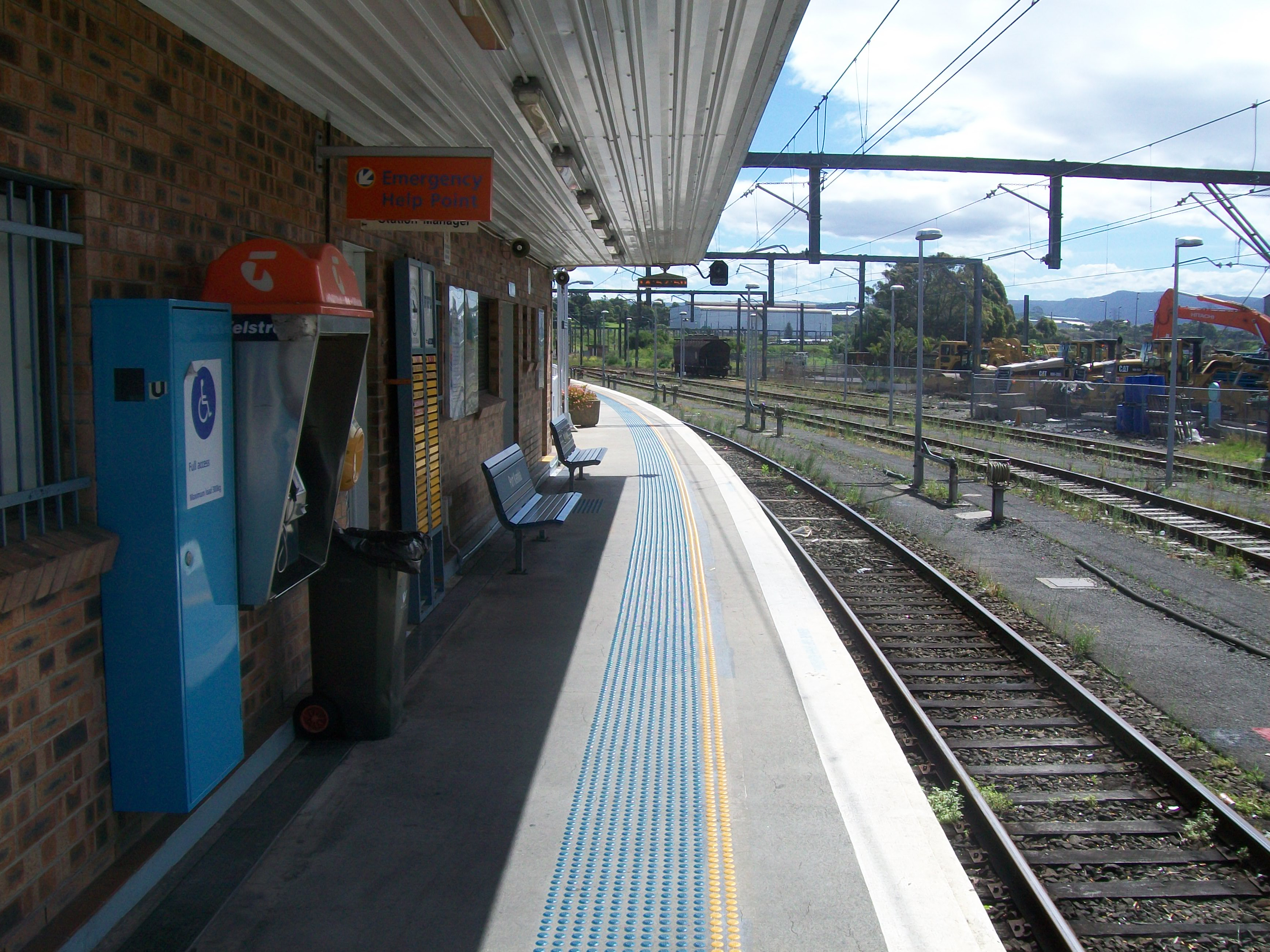
- Westbound platform view in January 2008

General information
- Location: Old Port Road, Port Kembla; New South Wales; Australia
- Coordinates: 34.4773°S 150.9014°E
- Elevation: 7 metres (23 ft)
- Owner: Transport Asset Manager of New South Wales
- Operator: Sydney Trains
- Line: Port Kembla railway line
- Distance: 90.239 kilometres (56.072 mi) from Central
- Platforms: 1 (197 metres)
- Tracks: 3
- Connections: Bus

Construction
- Structure type: At-grade
- Parking: Yes
- Cycle facilities: Yes
- Accessible: Yes

Other information
- Status: Staffed
- Website: Transport for NSW

History
- Opened: 9 March 1936; 90 years ago
- Electrified: 4 February 1986; 40 years ago

Passengers
- 2023: 34,360 (year); 94 (daily) (Sydney Trains, NSW TrainLink)

Services
Preceding station	Intercity Trains	Following station
Terminus	South Coast Line	Port Kembla North towards Central or Bondi Junction
Location

Port Kembla railway station is a single-platform intercity train terminal located in Port Kembla, Australia, on the South Coast railway line's Port Kembla branch. The station serves Sydney Trains traveling north to Wollongong and Sydney. The station also serves as a stabling location for South Coast line trains.

== History ==
The wharves, mills and factories that today characterise Port Kembla began to develop in the early part of the 20th century. The railway from the main South Coast line to the new port was completed in July 1916, but the only station, Mount Drummond, was at the northern end. Port Kembla, at the southern end near the Outer Harbour breakwater, opened in January 1920. Additional stations were to follow: in 1926 at Cringila, 1936 on the southern boundary of the Australian Iron & Steel steelworks (Port Kembla North), and 1938 within the John Lysaghts site.

Electric multiple unit trains began to service Port Kembla from February 1986 and the station building was replaced at the same time. Electronic ticketing facilities were activated in 2014.

As a terminal station, Port Kembla also features a small stabling yard made up of a platform road, passing loop and engine siding.

== Platforms and services ==
Port Kembla has one platform. It is serviced by Sydney Trains South Coast line services from Waterfall and Thirroul. One weekday morning peak and four weekend late night services go to Bondi Junction.

Platform	Line	Stopping pattern	Notes
1	South Coast Line	services to & from Thirroul & Waterfall; 1 weekday morning peak & 4 weekend late night services to Bondi Junction	

== Transport links ==
Premier Illawarra operates two bus routes via Port Kembla station, under contract to Transport for NSW:

- 43: to Dapto
- 65: to North Beach
