= Thirroul railway station =

Railway station in New South Wales, Australia

Thirroul
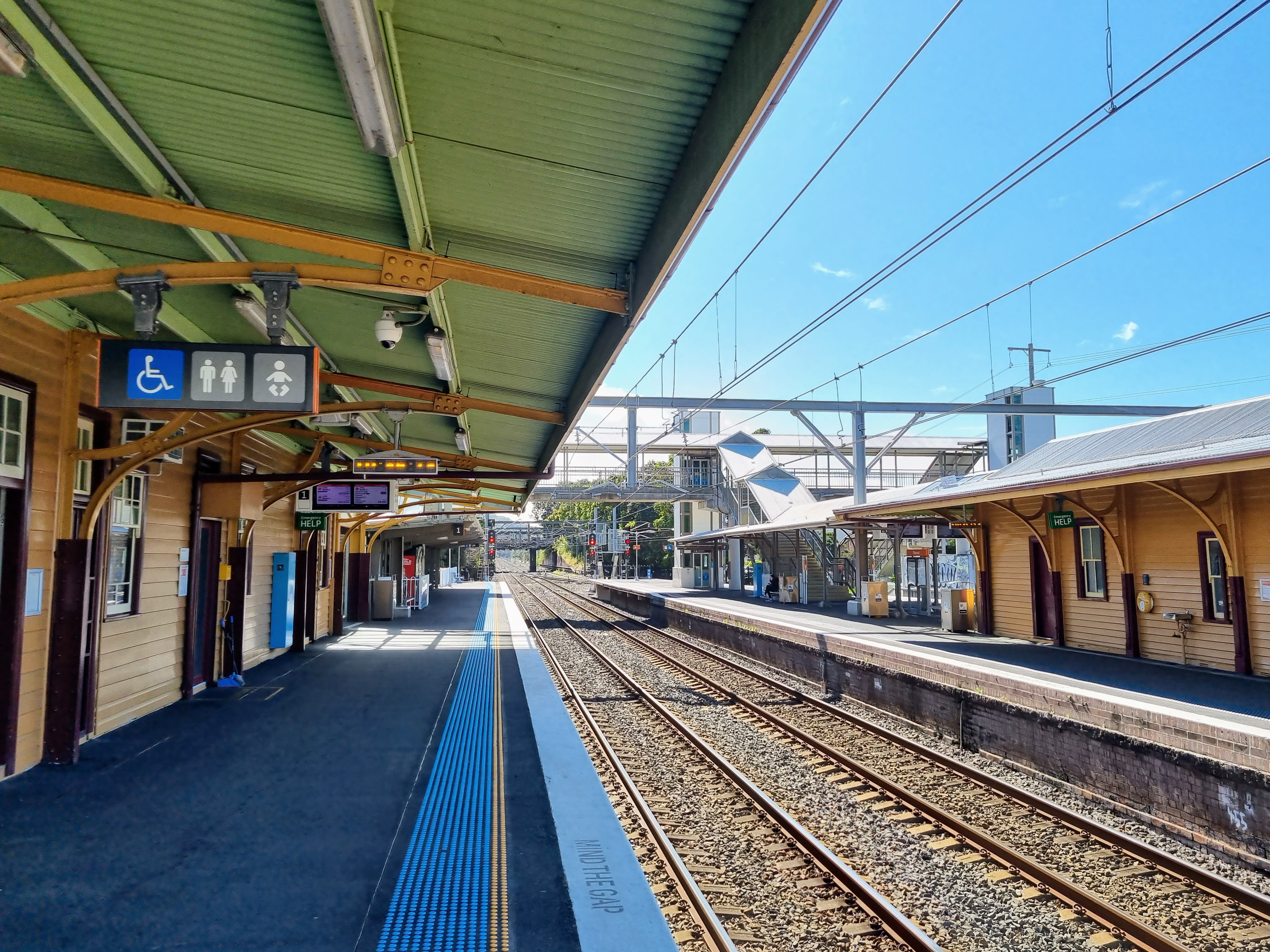
- Northbound view from Platform 1, September 2023

General information
- Location: Railway Parade, Thirroul; Australia
- Coordinates: 34°19′05″S 150°55′08″E
- Elevation: 14 metres (46 ft)
- Owner: Transport Asset Manager of New South Wales
- Operator: Sydney Trains
- Line: South Coast
- Distance: 70.24 kilometres (43.65 mi) from Central
- Platforms: 3 (1 side, 1 island)
- Tracks: 4
- Connections: Bus

Construction
- Structure type: Ground
- Accessible: Yes

Other information
- Status: Staffed
- Station code: TRL
- Website: Transport for NSW

History
- Opened: 21 June 1887
- Former names: Robbinsville (1887–1891)

Passengers
- 2023: 473,520 (year); 1,297 (daily) (Sydney Trains, NSW TrainLink)

Services
| Preceding station | Intercity Trains | Following station |
|---|---|---|
| Bulli towards Kiama or Port Kembla | South Coast Line | Austinmer towards Central or Bondi Junction |
| North Wollongong towards Kiama | South Coast Line Express | Helensburgh towards Central or Bondi Junction |
Excursion runs
| Preceding station | East Coast Heritage Rail | Following station |
| Wollongong towards Moss Vale | The Cockatoo Run | Sutherland towards Central |
Location

Thirroul railway station is a heritage-listed railway station on the South Coast railway line in New South Wales, Australia. It serves the northern Wollongong suburb of Thirroul. It was added to the New South Wales State Heritage Register on 2 April 1999.

== History ==
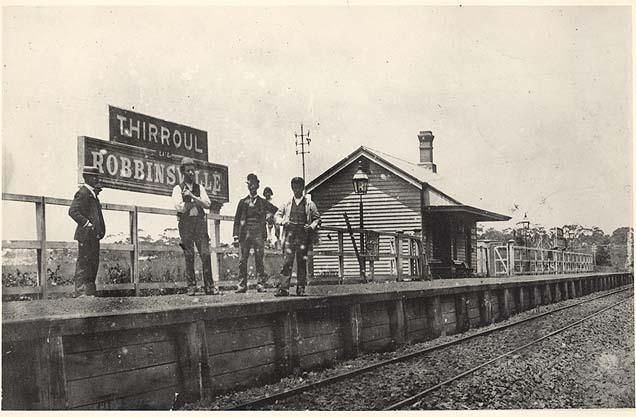
The station c.1891

In the 1870s when settlement of the area began, all the area north of Wollongong was known as Bulli and Thirroul was called North Bulli. Before white settlement the area was the land of the Thurrural tribe. There were many different ways of spelling the name which translates to "the place or valley of the cabbage tree palms".

Robbinsville was a former name for the village of Thirroul. The village was called Robbinsville after Frederick Robbins, who owned land in the area. The name was adopted at a meeting of inhabitants of the area in February 1880. Thirroul became known as a tourist resort "Thirroul has long been popular for surfing, and cottages of Sydney people cluster thickly along the ocean side."

An isolated section of the Illawarra Railway was built in 1887 from near Stanwell Park to Yallah as a single line, and was finally connected to the northern (Sydney) section of the railway on 3 October 1888. The station opened on 21 June 1887 as Robbinsville, Robbinsville having a small timber station building with timber platform, and was renamed Thirroul in November 1891.

When the line was duplicated from Scarborough to Thirroul in 1915 this caused a new platform to be built on the Up side with a large timber platform building relocated to Thirroul Platform 1 from Scarborough. At the time of its relocation, the building's internal layout included a lavatory, ladies' room, general waiting room, and a combined booking, parcels and ticket office, with an awning at the end as well as on the platform side. A separate timber building contained men's toilets (possibly also relocated from Scarborough). The relocation to Thirroul led to some modifications to the building including new awnings and chimneys.

At the same time, the original building was extended northward and a footbridge was erected. The original building on Platform 2/3 at Thirroul was altered again in 1939 for the change to an island platform.

In 1921 the railway institute building was built at the southern end of the Up platform and in 1938 a back platform track was laid in for storage of suburban trains to Port Kembla. In 1937 the railway institute building was extended.

1941 plans show extensive loco depot arrangements at Thirroul with an oil store, ash truck, coal bunker, turntable, weighbridge and offices. In 1986 the line was electrified and a new platform canopy was added to the entry end of Platform 2/3.

Until the 1960s, Thirroul Railway Depot existed to the north of the station.

In 1989 the Platform 1 building was extensively upgraded. In 2005 the existing footbridge was replaced with the existing reinforced concrete footbridge and stairs having lifts to the north end of the platforms. Steel canopies were also provided linking the footbridge to the platform buildings.

== Platforms and services ==
Thirroul has one side platform and one island platform with two faces. It is serviced by Sydney Trains South Coast line services travelling between Sydney Central, Bondi Junction and Kiama, as well as local services from Waterfall to Port Kembla. Some Port Kembla services also terminate at Thirroul.

| Platform | Line | Stopping pattern | Notes |
| 1 | SCO | services to Central & Bondi Junction | |
| 2 | SCO | services to Port Kembla & Kiama | |
| 3 | SCO | services to Port Kembla | |

== Transport links ==
Dion's Bus Service operates two bus routes via Thirroul station, under contract to Transport for NSW:

- 90: Austinmer to Wollongong
- 91: Austinmer to University of Wollongong

Premier Charters operates one bus route via Thirroul station, under contract to Transport for NSW:

- 2: Stanwell Park to Wollongong

== Description ==
The Thirroul station precinct includes the station buildings on Platform 1 and 2/3 (completed 1887 with 1915 alterations), the Railway Institute building (completed 1921 with 1937 alterations), the former toilet block (1915), two platforms (1887 with 1915 alterations), and modern steps, lifts, platform canopies and a footbridge (2005). The heritage listing includes the signals to the south of railway institute building.

Thirroul Railway Station is located between Station Street (on the east) and Railway Parade (to the west), and is entered on the west through a park between the station and Lawrence Hargrave Drive, and from Station Street on the east via a modern covered footbridge with lifts and stairs. There are station car parks on the western side of Station Street, and on the eastern side of Railway Parade. The station has a perimeter platform on its western side and an island platform to the east. The station's perimeters are defined with white powder-coated aluminium fencing. Platform 1 is the western perimeter platform. Platform 2/3 is the eastern island platform.

Platform 1 Building (1887, 1915)

A weatherboard building with a cantilevered skillion platform awning with curved steel brackets on bolted steel posts. The awning has timber valances to both north and south ends. The building has a complex gabled corrugated steel roof, with gable ends to north and south, and projecting bay with gable end located towards the north end of the building on the street side (west elevation) only. Gable ends feature rectangular timber louvred vents, simple timber bargeboards and finials. There are two brick chimneys. The awning extends for a bay beyond the north end of the building to allow cover to the ticket window which is located at the end of the building, with a separate skillion roof. The building has modern timber panelled doors with 9-paned fanlights above. The waiting area at the north end of the building has 2 pairs of modern timber panelled double doors, one facing the platform, and the other facing north, beneath a cantilevered awning with steel brackets and a corrugated steel skillion roof. The double doors have 12-paned fanlights (2 lines of 6 panes).

The platform building contains waiting rooms, offices for the Station Master, parcels office and toilets and ladies waiting room. The waiting area at the north end of the building has been modernised. This has 2 pairs of modern timber panelled double doors, one facing the platform, and the other facing north, beneath a cantilevered awning with steel brackets and a corrugated steel skillion roof.

Platform 2/3 Building (1887, 1915)

A single storey weatherboard platform building with a gabled corrugated steel roof and cantilevered skillion roofed awnings on both sides. There are no chimneys to the roof. The awnings have curved steel brackets mounted on steel posts and timber valances to both north and south ends. The building features timber framed double hung windows. Note: This building is thought to be the original station building, however, extended and lateres in 1915 for duplication works with new platform awnings, and latered again in 1938 for changes to the island platform.

The platform building contains waiting rooms, offices for the Station Master, parcels office and toilets and ladies waiting room.

Thirroul Railway Institute Building (1921, 1937)

This is a single storey weatherboard and fibro freestanding building with a gabled corrugated steel roof, located at the south end of Platform 1. The building has a gabled entry porch on its northern elevation supported on timber posts on short concrete posts. The concrete posts are capped with concrete made to resemble sandstone. On its southern elevation, the building has a skillion roofed veranda the full width of the elevation, supported on timber posts on short concrete posts with caps made to resemble sandstone. The building's walls are timber up to window sill level with fibro above. The building features timber framed double hung windows with 9-paned top sashes. The gable ends to north and south elevations are timber shingled to the apex with pairs of small decorative timber brackets below the line of shingles, and timber battened fibro below. There are timber panelled double entry doors to the main entry on the north elevation. On the south elevation, in the southeast corner beneath the veranda roof, there is an addition with walls of vertical timber boards.

Former toilets (1915)

To the north of the railway institute is a small freestanding weatherboard gable-roofed former toilet building with a timber infilled gabled veranda facing south. There is a timber-framed window opening on the east side with frosted glass to the lower part and glass louvres to the upper part. There are rectangular timber vents to north and south gable ends. Note: this building may also have been relocated from Scarborough in 1915.

Platforms (1887, 1915)

1 perimeter platform, 1 island platform – both with brick edges with concrete capping, asphalt surfaces

Footbridge, steps, lifts (2005)

Covered footbridge, steps and lifts towards the northern end of the station.

Platform canopies (2005)

On both Platforms 1 and 2/3 to the north of the platform buildings, modern canopies on steel posts with concrete bases and corrugated Colorbond roofs connect the platform buildings to the footbridge, steps and lifts towards the northern end of the platforms.

Landscape and natural features

Views of the Illawarra escarpment are available from the platforms at Thirroul Railway Station.

Moveable items

Signals located south of the railway institute building. Contents of Railway Institute building.

Condition

The platform buildings, Railway Institute building, former toilet block, moveable items and platforms were reported to be in good condition as at 29 July 2009.

Both platform buildings were extensively altered in 1915, and interiors modernised recently. The extant railway station structures are externally intact as a group developed from 1887 to 1937.

=== Modifications and dates ===
- 1912: Crossing loop added
- 1915: Former Scarborough platform building relocated to Thirroul Platform 1 with new awning and chimneys. Existing 1887 building on Platform 2/3 altered for line duplication, with new platform awnings and extension.
- 1921: Railway institute building built
- 1937: Railway institute building was extended.
- 1939: Platform 2/3 building altered for changes to island platform
- 1941: Extensive loco depot arrangements at Thirroul with oil store, ash truck, coal bunker, turntable, weighbridge and offices.
- 1986: Line electrified. New platform canopy added to the entry end of Platform 2/3.
- 1989: Platform 1 building extensively refurbished
- 2005: Existing footbridge and stairs replaced, steel canopies provided linking the footbridge to the platform buildings.

== Heritage listing ==
Thirroul Railway Station – including the platform buildings, former weatherboard toilets, Railway Institute building, platforms and moveable items is of State heritage significance. Thirroul Railway Station is of State historical significance as a railway station representing two separate periods of the construction of the Illawarra line – the initial 1887 construction and 1915 duplication of the line – and for its role as a transport hub for Thirroul since 1887. Thirroul Railway Station has historical significance for its role in the development of Thirroul as a seaside resort in the late 19th and early 20th centuries. Thirroul Railway Station is also of historical significance as a former major locomotive depot on the Illawarra line, evidenced by the railway institute building and moveable items.

The Thirroul Railway Station platforms, platform buildings and Railway Institute building are of aesthetic significance as early railway station buildings and structures, the platform buildings not being typical of their type due to major 1915 alterations for duplication of the line. The railway institute building, altered in 1937, is a rare example of this type of railway structure. The active use of the former railway institute building at Thirroul for the Thirroul Railway Institute Preservation Society indicates the social significance of this building. The platform buildings are good examples of early (1887) platform buildings with later (1915) adaptations. The Railway Institute building is rare as there are no examples of this type of building on the Illawarra line, and very few remaining in NSW.

Thirroul railway station was listed on the New South Wales State Heritage Register on 2 April 1999 having satisfied the following criteria.

The place is important in demonstrating the course, or pattern, of cultural or natural history in New South Wales.

Thirroul Railway Station is of historical significance as a railway station representing two separate periods of the construction of the Illawarra line – the initial 1887 construction and 1915 duplication of the line – and for its role as a transport hub for Thirroul since 1887. The Thirroul Platform 1 building is of historical significance as a building dating from the initial construction of the Illawarra line, altered in 1915 for duplication of the line. Thirroul railway station has historical significance for its role in the development of Thirroul as a seaside resort in the late 19th and early 20th centuries. Thirroul Railway Station is also of historical significance as a former major loco depot on the Illawarra line, evidenced by the Railway Institute building and moveable items. The railway station buildings and structures show evidence of having developed over time since 1887.

The place is important in demonstrating aesthetic characteristics and/or a high degree of creative or technical achievement in New South Wales.

The Thirroul Railway Station's 1887 platform buildings are of aesthetic significance as examples of weatherboard platform buildings, not typical of the standard design types due to major 1915 alterations for duplication of the line (including the relocation of the Platform 1 building from Scarborough). The 1921 Railway Institute building, altered in 1937, is a rare example of this type of structure.

The place has strong or special association with a particular community or cultural group in New South Wales for social, cultural or spiritual reasons.

The active use of the former railway institute building at Thirroul for the Thirroul Railway Institute Preservation Society indicates the social significance of this building.

The place possesses uncommon, rare or endangered aspects of the cultural or natural history of New South Wales.

The Thirroul Railway Institute building is rare, as there are very few extant examples in the NSW railways network, though there are other examples at Central, Cooma, and Orange. The Platform 1 building is one of only four extant weatherboard platform buildings of this type on the Illawarra line (other examples at Albion Park, Bulli and Dapto). The most intact examples of the four extant are those at Albion Park and Bulli. The Platform 2/3 building is a rare example of a weatherboard platform building, of which there are only four of this type extant on the Illawarra line (other examples at Austinmer, Oatley (altered), and Penshurst).

The place is important in demonstrating the principal characteristics of a class of cultural or natural places/environments in New South Wales.

The platform buildings are representative examples of 1887 weatherboard platform buildings of their types, though with 1915 alterations.
