= Calwalla, New South Wales =

Village in New South Wales, Australia

Calwalla
- Town
- Coordinates: 34°33′S 150°17′E
- Country: Australia
- State: New South Wales
- Region: Southern Highlands
- LGA: Wingecarribee Shire
- Location: 131 km (81 mi) SW of Sydney; 12 km (7.5 mi) E of Moss Vale; 82 km (51 mi) ENE of Goulburn; 49 km (30 mi) W of Kiama

Government
  - State electorate: Goulburn
  - Federal division: Whitlam
- Elevation: 678 m (2,224 ft)
- Postcode: 2577
- County: Camden
- Parish: Bong Bong
Localities around Calwalla
Burradoo	Glenquarry	Glenquarry
Moss Vale	Calwalla	Kangaloon
Manchester Square	Avoca	Burrawang

Calwalla is a small village in the Southern Highlands of New South Wales, Australia, in Wingecarribee Shire.

== Transport ==
The village was served by a station on the Unanderra–Moss Vale railway line, which opened in 1932 and closed in 1976. It has subsequently been demolished and little trace remains.

Preceding station	Former services	Following station
Moss Vale Terminus	Unanderra–Moss Vale Line	Burrawang towards Unanderra
