= Summit Tank railway station =

Former railway station in New South Wales, Australia

Summit Tank
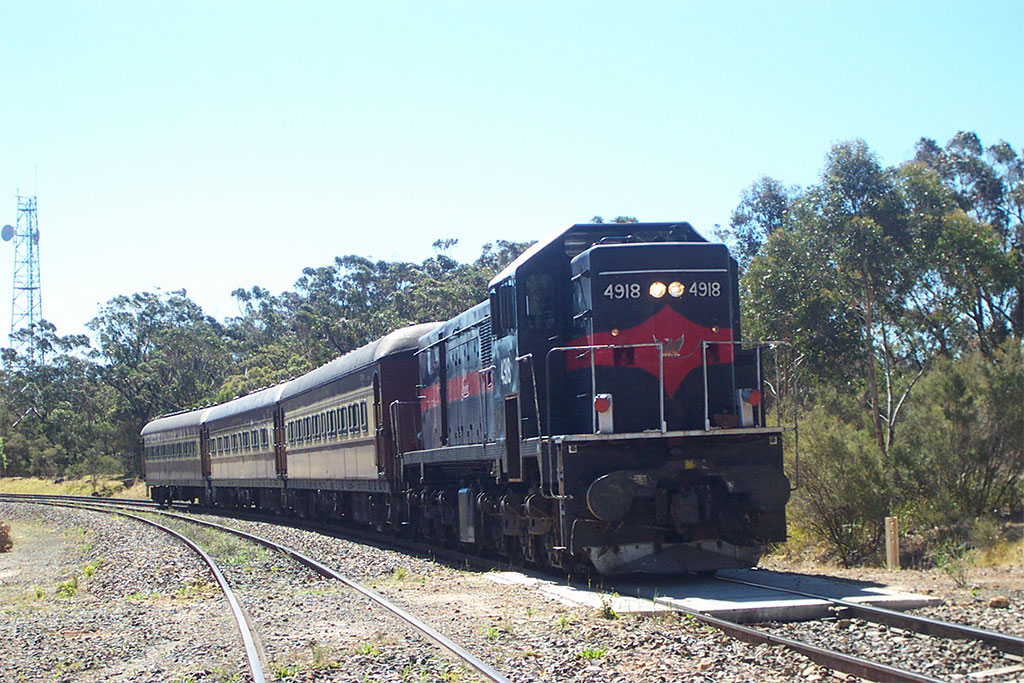

General information
- Location: Fire trail, Avon; New South Wales; Australia
- Coordinates: 34.5125°S 150.7061°E
- System: Platform ← Unanderra · Mount Murray →
- Line: Unanderra–Moss Vale
- Distance: 108.14 km from Central
- Platforms: 1
- Tracks: 2 plus perway siding

Construction
- Structure type: At-grade

History
- Opened: 20 August 1932

Services
Excursion runs
Preceding station	East Coast Heritage Rail	Following station
Robertson towards Moss Vale	The Cockatoo Run 20-minute lookout stop	Unanderra One-way operation
Preceding station	Former services	Following station
Mount Murray towards Moss Vale	Unanderra–Moss Vale Line	Unanderra Terminus
Location

Summit Tank is a railway platform on the Unanderra–Moss Vale line in the Southern Highlands of New South Wales, Australia. The platform is located on the main line; there is an active passing loop and perway siding beside it.

== History ==
In the late 1920s, it was decided by the then New South Wales Government that a railway line was needed between Moss Vale and Wollongong to get freight trains from southern locations directly to Port Kembla and away from the increasing passenger train services in southern and south western Sydney. A right of way was surveyed from Unanderra just south of Wollongong through the southern part of Farmborough Heights on a gradient of 1 in 33 to Moss Vale.

== Traffic ==
Summit Tank is a location where banker or pusher engines were taken off Moss Vale bound trains and for extra braking were added to heavy Wollongong or Port Kembla bound trains. Summit Tank had a passenger platform, train crew amenities and a 60-foot (18 m) manual turntable for turning locomotives and ash pits.

Summit Tank still sees the occasional bank engine with heavy steel trains regularly using the Unanderra to Moss Vale line to gain access to the Main South Line to Melbourne. Other traffic on the line includes container trains, bulk wheat and other grain trains, mostly from southern New South Wales; coal trains from Tahmoor; western coal trains using the line during Illawarra line trackwork; limestone trains from Medway, as well as the once-a-month Cockatoo Run to and from Sydney.

Summit Tank has a mainline and passing loop with a platform for safeworking duties including a local control panel and radio antenna for train operations. Further towards Moss Vale there is a platform where Cockatoo Run passengers can alight to visit a scenic look-out on the edge of the Illawarra Escarpment, with views over Lake Illawarra and the Pacific Ocean.
