= Mount Murray railway station =

Former railway station in New South Wales, Australia

Mount Murray

General information
- Location: Mount Murray Road, Mount Murray; New South Wales; Australia
- Coordinates: 34.5517°S 150.6389°E
- System: Former railway station ← Summit Tank · Robertson →
- Owner: Transport Asset Manager of New South Wales
- Line: Unanderra–Moss Vale
- Distance: 118.99 km (73.94 mi) from Central
- Platforms: 1
- Tracks: 2

Construction
- Structure type: At-grade

History
- Opened: 20 August 1932
- Closed: 1980s

Services
Preceding station	Former services	Following station
Ocean View towards Moss Vale	Unanderra–Moss Vale Line	Summit Tank towards Unanderra
Location

Mount Murray is a heritage-listed former railway station in Mount Murray on the Unanderra to Moss Vale railway line in New South Wales, Australia. The station is listed on local and NSW State Heritage Registers as a rare surviving example of small station infrastructure. The platform is located on a passing loop, which is still in use today.

== History ==
The station was opened with the line on 20 August 1932, as part of the war effort for a 400-metre (1,300 ft) long crossing loop for heavy World War II traffic. The platform was constructed from pre-cast concrete and the single small station building was of timber. The crossing loop was reopened and extended to 650 metres (2,130 ft) following the installation of CTC in the 1980s. Since September 2008, signalling functions for the crossing loop through the station and the adjoining main line have been managed by ARTC's network control centre in Junee.

== Description ==
The station precinct consists of a timber wayside station building of a type 13 design with a platform faced in pre-cast concrete, dating from 1932. A toilet block also forms part of the complex.

== Heritage status ==
The station buildings were listed as heritage items by Wingecarribee Shire Council in 1989. In 1999 the station and an area of tracks 50 metres (160 ft) either side of it were also listed on the NSW State Heritage Register. The station was described as architecturally, historically and socially rare, and "representative of many small structures that have been removed from the rail system as branch lines and small locations have become redundant."

The line alongside the platform also forms part of the Sydney to Moss Vale heritage run operated by 3801 steam locomotives.
