= Unanderra–Moss Vale railway line =

Railway line in New South Wales, Australia

Unanderra–Moss Vale line

Overview
- Status: Active
- Owner: Transport Asset Manager of New South Wales
- Locale: Illawarra, Southern Highlands
- Termini: Unanderra; Moss Vale
- Stations: 9 (5 open)

Service
- Type: Freight, Tourist
- Operator(s): East Coast Heritage Rail (occasional tourist services)

History
- Opened: August 1932

Technical
- Line length: 57 km (35 mi)

The Unanderra–Moss Vale railway line is a cross country railway line in New South Wales, Australia. The line branches from the Illawarra line at Unanderra and winds west up the Illawarra escarpment to join the Main South line at Moss Vale. The line is one of the most scenic in New South Wales, and for the first 20 km (12 mi) after leaving Unanderra has an almost continuous grade 1 in 30 providing extensive views over the Illawarra coastline.

== Route ==
The line is 57 kilometres (35 mi) in length, and is double track from Unanderra to Dombarton. The line then becomes single track with several crossing loops. Legacies of the abandoned Maldon – Dombarton railway line that was partly built in the 1980s are a bridge over the old Princes Highway at Unanderra, double track section to Dombarton and unfinished electrification masts. The single track bridge at Dombarton was recycled in February 1992, being installed on the Lavender Bay branch of the North Shore line at Waverton.

The line connects the following current and former passenger stations:

- Unanderra – junction with Illawarra line
- Dombarton – end of double line (formerly the site of an unusual crossing loop arrangement)
- Summit Tank (platform only) (crossing loop)
- Mount Murray (closed) (crossing loop reopened 1980s)
- Ocean View (closed 1968)
- Ranelagh House (platform only)
- Robertson (platform) (crossing loop)
- Burrawang (closed 1975)
- Calwalla (closed 1976) (crossing loop reopened 1980s)
- Moss Vale – triangular junction with Main South line

== History ==
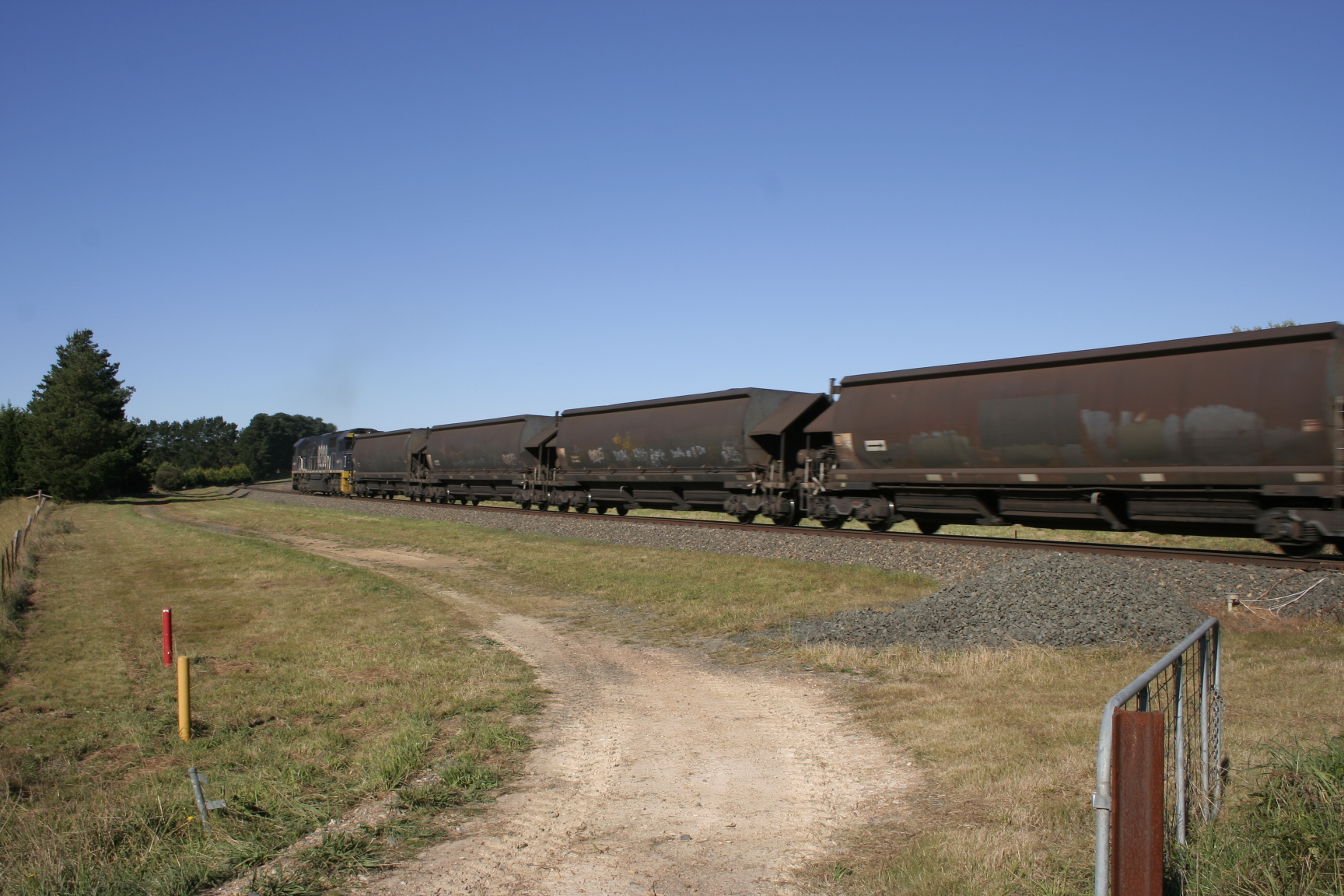
Unanderra–Moss Vale line at Sheepwash Road

The line was first proposed in the 1880s by residents of Moss Vale and local industry keen for a connection to the port at Port Kembla. However, the impetus for the line was as a condition of the erection of a new steelworks at Port Kembla, by Hoskins Iron and Steel. The government announced that the line would be constructed, in November 1923.

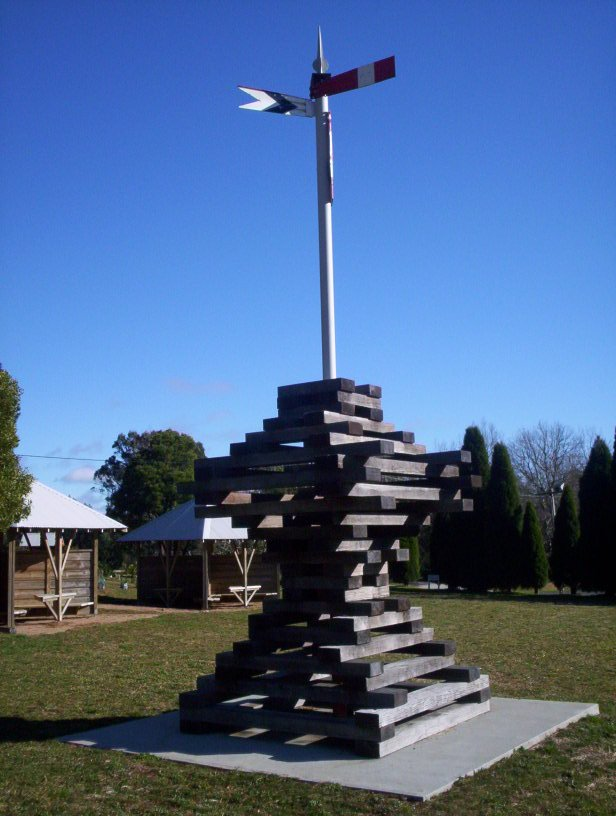
Memorial to workers on the Unanderra-Moss Vale railway (1927–32) in Robertson

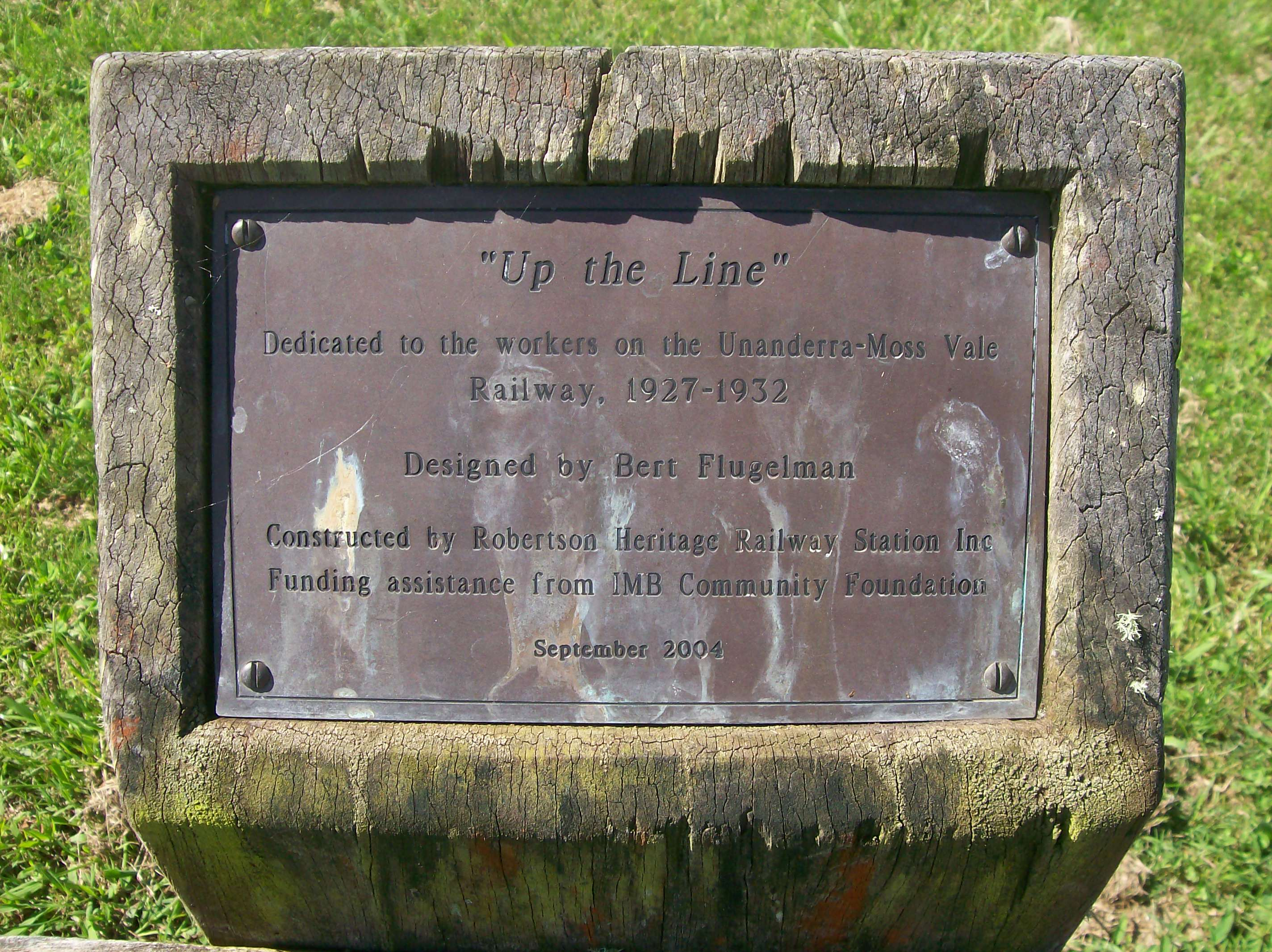
Memorial plaque

Construction began on 26 June 1925, and the line opened on 20 August 1932. The delay in opening the line was costly to the government, because when the steelworks opened, in 1928, it paid freight costs as if the line were open, although trains actually travelled over a much longer route until 1932. Because parts of the line are susceptible to falling rocks snow sheds were erected to catch falling debris.

The line initially carried mainly limestone from the Marulan Quarry to Port Kembla Steelworks, but also vegetables from Robertson to Sydney and later, coal. Passenger services began in August 1932 with CPH railmotors. From 1938 these were replaced by 30 class steam locomotives. From February 1967 the CPHs once again operated the service. The weekday service was replaced by road transport in September 1985.

A locomotive hauled weekend train from Sydney to Moss Vale via Unanderra was introduced and operated until July 1994. It was replaced by an Endeavour railcar service from Wollongong.

Following the NSW Department of Transport seeking expressions of interest to take over the weekends only passenger service as a tourist operation, 3801 Limited commenced the Cockatoo Run heritage tourist train on 19 August 1995. Initially the train operated from a base established in the Port Kembla Locomotive Depot Complex as a return Wollongong to Moss Vale service. Steam locomotive SMR18 was leased by 3801 Limited from the Hunter Valley Training Company for the service.

Financial difficulties led to the suspension of the Cockatoo Run from November 1998 until March 1999, after which date the train ran between Port Kembla and Robertson only. Furthermore, it was diesel hauled and ran for nine months of the year.

From March 2001, the Cockatoo Run was merged with another of the 3801 Limited's operations, the Long Lunch Train. This service operated on selected Sundays and Wednesdays or Thursdays with heritage diesel locomotives. It has on occasions operated with steam locomotives from the Lachlan Valley Railway and Powerhouse Museum. The Cockatoo Run currently operates on selected Sundays.

In 2022, the railway line was damaged due to rain erosion. Maintenance workers closed the line in a period of 7 months. In October of that year, the line re-opened.

== Services ==
A NSW TrainLink road coach service is now provided in lieu of the former rail service. The three times daily service stops at Wollongong, Dapto and Albion Park stations, Hoddle Street Burrawang, Illawarra Highway Robertson, then at Bowral and Moss Vale stations. One service per day also serves Exeter and Bundanoon stations.

Limestone freight continues to operate, and the line remains a valuable freight link to the shipping terminal at Port Kembla and various industries in the Illawarra region. It is a useful bypass line when engineering works close the Main South line.

The line remains popular with steam locomotive hauled services from Sydney as the line allows them to operate a loop without the need to turn the locomotive.

== Deviation ==
A section of the line was deviated in 1973 to avoid Wingecarribee Reservoir.

== Derailments ==
The single recorded fatal accident on the line occurred in 1998. The train derailed after striking debris thrown on the track from a bridge collapse, killing both drivers. In 2004, the Rail Infrastructure Corporation was fined $300,000 for failing to ensure the rail line was free of hazards.

On 15 December 2020, 39 out of 41 wagons of a grain train on its way to Port Kembla were derailed near Farmborough Heights around 5:00am, losing most of its 2,600 tonnes of grain.
