= Argyle Street railway bridge, Moss Vale =

Argyle Street railway bridge
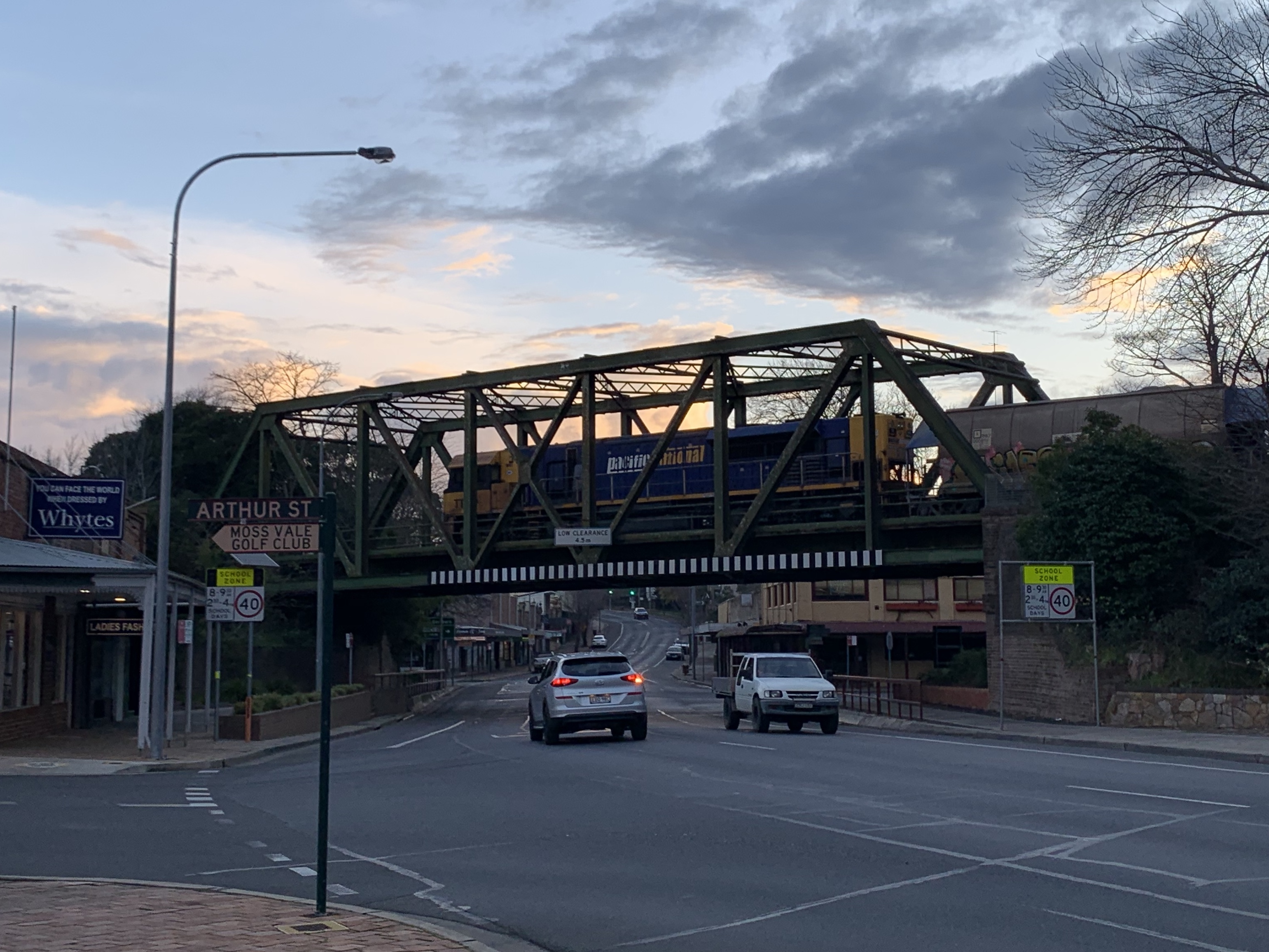
- The bridge in July 2020
- Coordinates: 34°33′03″S 150°22′12″E
- Carries: Main Southern railway
- Locale: Moss Vale, Wingecarribee Shire, New South Wales, Australia: 146.037 km (91 mi) from Central station
- Owner: Transport Asset Manager of New South Wales

Characteristics
- Design: Pratt truss
- Material: Steel
- Total length: 40.54 metres (133.0 ft)
- Longest span: 40.54 metres (133.0 ft)
- No. of spans: 1

Rail characteristics
- No. of tracks: 2
- Track gauge: 4 ft 8 1/2 in (1,435 mm) standard gauge

History
- Designer: New South Wales Government Railways
- Constructed by: New South Wales Government Railways
- Fabrication by: Dorman Long of Middlesbrough, England
- Construction end: 1914

New South Wales Heritage Register
- Official name: Moss Vale rail underbridge over Argyle Street; Argyle Street railway bridge
- Type: state heritage (built)
- Designated: 2 April 1999
- Reference no.: 1049
- Type: Railway Bridge/Viaduct
- Category: Transport – Rail
- Builders: Steel supplied by Dorman Long, Middlesbrough, England

Location
- Interactive map of Argyle Street railway bridge

The Argyle Street railway bridge is a heritage-listed railway bridge on the Main Southern railway line (146.037 km) at Moss Vale in the Southern Highlands of New South Wales, Australia. It was designed and built by the New South Wales Government Railways in 1914 with steel supplied by Dorman Long of Middlesbrough, England. The property is owned by Transport Asset Manager of New South Wales, an agency of the Government of New South Wales. It was added to the New South Wales State Heritage Register on 2 April 1999.

== History ==
During the period from 1910 to 1923, the New South Wales Government Railways embarked on a large programme of railway duplications; on the Main South line from Picton to Cootamundra, on the Main Western line from Bowenfels to Orange, on the Main Northern line from Farley to Branxton and on the Illawarra line from Waterfall to Wollongong.

The dominant structure for the underbridges was the brick arch in single spans and multiple span viaducts. Concurrently, there were brick arches on the Metropolitan Goods Lines.

However, there were sites where brick arches were not appropriate and Argyle Street, Moss Vale, on the Main South, was one of them.

When the original single track Main South line was built through Moss Vale in 1868, it crossed Argyle Street on a low-level timber beam bridge. In 1886 the Existing Lines Branch replaced the timber bridge with a wrought iron truss, still single track.

When the duplications were planned around 1910 a new double track bridge was designed. It was to be at a higher level, clear span over Argyle Street. By then the change over from British to American bridge technology was complete and American style steel Pratt trusses were standard for large span railway bridges.

A policy decision was made to build for the future with bridges designed to carry locomotives of double the current weight and for higher speeds. This avoided the expensive operation of frequent replacing of and relocating of inadequate bridges, as happened at Moss Vale when the 30-year old wrought iron truss was removed then rebuilt at Liverpool over the Georges River to serve the military area. The cost-effectiveness of the policy has been proved at Moss Vale, and many other sites, because the bridges are still in use carrying the modern heavy diesel locomotives with strings of heavy bulk wagons.

== Description ==
The Argyle Street railway bridge is a large steel through Pratt truss bridge on a 40.54 m (133 feet) skew span with brick abutments and wing walls.

It was reported to be in good condition as at 16 March 2006. The bridge retains its original fabric.

== Heritage listing ==
The Argyle Street railway truss in Moss Vale is considered significant because it is an important item of infrastructure on the historic Main South Railway and has been in use for 85 years, it is a dominant feature of the Moss Vale townscape, it shares in the social and commercial contribution that the Main South Railway has made to New South Wales and the bridge has technical significance because of it was one of the new heavy-duty trusses of the American style Pratt truss which had become standard for large span bridges. The skew design and construction adds to the technical significance. The skew construction is relatively rare for major bridges. The bridge is a highly visible and fine example of a heavy duty, steel Pratt truss bridge, which retains its original fabric.

The Argyle Street railway bridge was listed on the New South Wales State Heritage Register on 2 April 1999 having satisfied the following criteria.

The place is important in demonstrating the course, or pattern, of cultural or natural history in New South Wales.

The Argyle Street railway truss at Moss Vale is an important item of infrastructure on the historic Main South Railway and has been in use for 85 years.

The place is important in demonstrating aesthetic characteristics and/or a high degree of creative or technical achievement in New South Wales.

The bridge is a dominant feature of the Moss Vale townscape.

The place has strong or special association with a particular community or cultural group in New South Wales for social, cultural or spiritual reasons.

The Main South has brought enormous social and commercial benefits to south-western NSW, the Southern Highlands and Sydney for 130 years.

The place has potential to yield information that will contribute to an understanding of the cultural or natural history of New South Wales.

The bridge has technical significance because of it was one of the new heavy-duty trusses of the American style Pratt truss which had become standard for large span bridges. The skew design and construction adds to the technical significance.

The place possesses uncommon, rare or endangered aspects of the cultural or natural history of New South Wales.

Skew bridges are relatively rare, particularly for major bridges where square crossing are preferred.

The place is important in demonstrating the principal characteristics of a class of cultural or natural places/environments in New South Wales.

A fine example of a highly visible steel Pratt truss bridge.

== See also ==
- List of railway bridges in New South Wales
- Moss Vale railway station
