= Maldon–Dombarton railway line =

Partially constructed railway line in New South Wales, Australia

Service
- Type: Railway

History
- Work began: 1983

Technical
- Line length: 34.9 km (21.7 mi)
- Track gauge: 4 ft 8 1/2 in (1,435 mm)
- Highest elevation: 140 m (460 ft)

The Maldon–Dombarton railway line is a partially constructed railway line in New South Wales, Australia. Construction commenced in December 1983 with the project being cancelled in June 1988. A number of feasibility studies have since been conducted, but none have found the project to be viable.

== Route ==
The proposed 34.9-kilometre line diverged from the Main South line at Maldon via a triangular junction and headed in a south-easterly direction over the Nepean River before crossing beneath the Hume Highway and Picton Road. It would then proceed to Wilton, over the Cordeaux River and through a four kilometre long tunnel which was to be the longest rail tunnel in Australia before joining the Moss Vale - Unanderra line at Dombarton. The line was to be single track throughout with passing loops at Wilton, Cordeaux and Avon.

== History ==
The origins of the line can be traced back to a late 1970s proposal to construct a line from the Lithgow and Picton area coalfields to a new export coal loader at Port Kembla. Plans advanced to the stage of the Public Transport Commission calling for expressions of interest in constructing the new line's major engineering feature, the 12 kilometre Cordeaux tunnel in December 1977 before the plan lapsed.

Following completion of the coal loader at Port Kembla in 1982, the idea of a rail link was revived and in September 1983, the Wran State Government announced the Maldon to Dombarton line would be constructed with completion expected in 1986. The line was to be electrified, but with 25 kV AC rather than the 1.5 kV DC system used on other New South Wales lines. The electrification would extend up the Main South line from Maldon to Glenlee Junction where the existing electrified network from Sydney ended and at Coniston Junction it would join the Illawarra line from Sydney that was in the process of being electrified. Construction commenced in December 1983.

In June 1988, the incoming Greiner State Government cancelled the project, despite having committed to completing the line in the March 1988 election. It cited a massive cost blowout and that the 1990 southern and western coal exports were now being forecast at one-third of that forecast in 1982, although chose to ignore the increased tonnages that would result from the impending closure of the Balmain coal loader and Glebe Island grain terminal.

In 2009, the Port Kembla Port Corporation released a pre-feasibility study into constructing the line. In 2011, the Federal Government published a feasibility study into constructing the line. This resulted in the Federal Government announcing that pre-construction activities would commence with contracts awarded in December 2012. Prior to winning the 2013 election, then Opposition Leader Tony Abbott, indicated that there was unlikely to be any further Federal Government funding for the freight line.

In July 2014, Transport for NSW completed the planning and pre-construction design work, making the project ready to go ahead pending market interest and planning approval.

On 24 September 2014, the State Government announced it would undertake a Registration of Interest process to test if there is private sector interest in designing, constructing, operating and maintaining the Maldon to Dombarton Railway on a commercially sustainable basis, without government funding. Submissions closed on 10 April 2015.

Transport for NSW ran an extensive evaluation process for the Registration of Interest that included seeking advice from independent experts. No respondent was found to be capable of constructing, operating and maintaining the proposed railway line on a commercially sustainable basis, without NSW Government funding. The NSW Government will use information obtained from the Registration of Interest to inform the future procurement process and the funding options available for implementing the Maldon to Dombarton Railway project.

== Legacy ==
When the project was suspended, some parts had already been completed. The following aspects were completed prior to suspension of works in 1988:

- Earthworks and track work required for the junctions with the Main South Line and the Moss Vale to Unanderra Line at Maldon and Dombarton respectively
- 25 kilometres (approximately 70%) of earthworks and drainage for the rail formation, and ballast in some sections
- Approach spans and abutments for the Nepean River bridge
- Tunnel portals at the eastern and western ends of the Avon tunnel
- Acquisition of land

Duplication of the existing Unanderra-Moss Vale railway line from Dombarton to Coniston Junction as well as a bridge built to take the line over the old Princes Highway at Unanderra eliminating a level crossing had been brought into use. Electrification masts had also been erected and those between Unanderra and Coniston Junction were used when the Illawarra line was electrified to Dapto in January 1993.

== See also ==
- Sandy Hollow–Gulgong railway line - railway project in the state's north with a drawn out construction
- Eastern Suburbs railway line - railway project in Sydney with a drawn out construction
