= Unanderra railway station =

Railway station in New South Wales, Australia

Unanderra
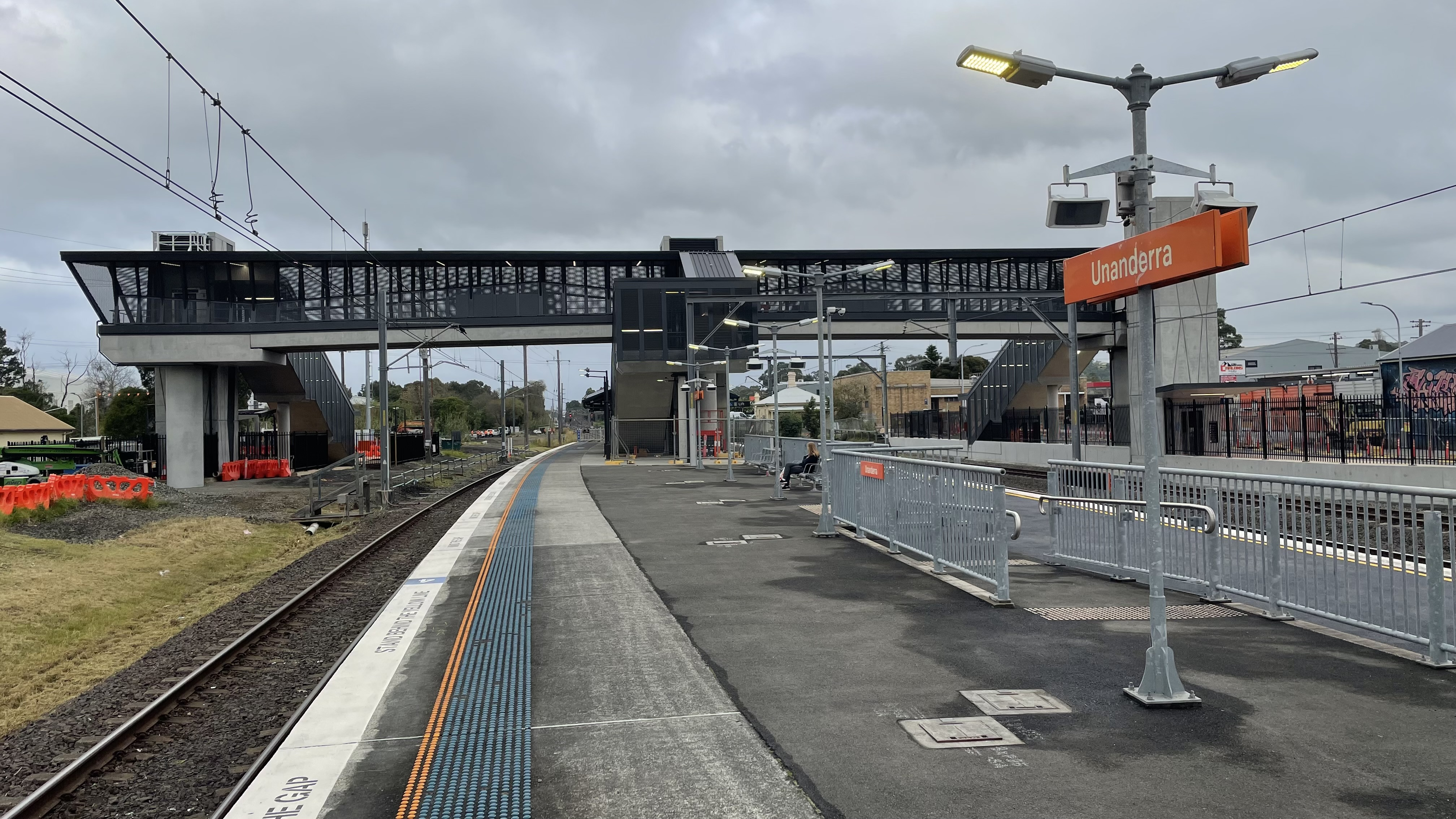
- South-west bound view from Platform 2, after access upgrade, June 2023

General information
- Location: Central Road, Unanderra; New South Wales; Australia
- Coordinates: 34°27′17″S 150°50′45″E
- Elevation: 14 metres (46 ft)
- Owner: Transport Asset Manager of New South Wales
- Operator: Sydney Trains
- Line: South Coast railway line
- Distance: 88.273 km (54.850 mi) from Central
- Platforms: 2 (island), 132 and 139 metres (433 and 456 ft)
- Train operators: Sydney Trains
- Bus operators: Premier Illawarra

Construction
- Structure type: At-grade
- Parking: Yes
- Accessible: Yes

Other information
- Status: Weekdays: Staffed: 5.35am to 8.30pm: Weekends and public holidays: Unstaffed
- Website: Transport for NSW

History
- Opened: 9 November 1887
- Electrified: 24 January 1993

Passengers
- 2023: 189,870 (year); 520 (daily) (Sydney Trains, NSW TrainLink)

Services
Preceding station	Intercity Trains	Following station
Kembla Grange Weekends & race days only towards Kiama	South Coast Line	Coniston towards Central or Bondi Junction
Dapto towards Kiama	South Coast Line	Coniston towards Central or Bondi Junction
Excursion runs
Preceding station	East Coast Heritage Rail	Following station
Summit Tank towards Moss Vale	The Cockatoo Run	Wollongong towards Central
Robertson One-way operation	The Cockatoo Run	Wollongong towards Central
Location
- Location within New South Wales

Unanderra railway station is located on the South Coast railway line in the Wollongong suburb of Unanderra, New South Wales, Australia.

== History ==
The first railway in the district was a privately operated track between Mount Kembla and Port Kembla, opened in 1882 to bring coal to port. In 1912, the NSW Government Railways assumed control of the line east of Unanderra. The government railway from Clifton to North Kiama opened in 1887 and included a single-platform Unanderra Station complete with weatherboard platform building and stationmaster's residence.

Premier George Fuller turned the first sod for the Illawarra Mountain Railway – now known as the Unanderra–Moss Vale line – at Unanderra on 26 June 1925. Fuller, whose family owned much of the Shellharbour district (indeed, Dunmore was named for his father's birthplace), took a keen interest in the development of the railways in his native Illawarra region. Despite costs doubling to £3 million, the line opened in August 1932, channelling freight traffic from the Southern Tablelands and Riverina regions through Unanderra and on to Port Kembla. To accommodate the increased traffic, the line was expanded to three tracks through the town, and the station became an island platform.

Between 1983 and 1988, electrical masts were installed along a section of the Moss Vale line near Unanderra in preparation for the subsequently cancelled Maldon–Dombarton rail link. For further history see Unanderra–Moss Vale railway line. The line through Unanderra was electrified in 1993.

In 2009, the NSW Government announced that it would install lifts at Unanderra Station at a cost of $11.4 million. The project stalled the following year after it was discovered that the plans had been approved without a proper utilities search at the site: water, gas and signal cables would need to be relocated to accommodate the lift shafts, at an additional cost of $5 million. By that stage, the platform building had been replaced and the platforms resurfaced. Following a change of government in 2011, the project was cancelled in favour of accessibility projects at Albion Park, Dapto and Gerringong; and a new station at Flinders. In response to criticism from the Opposition, the new transport minister simply noted that "unfortunately, commitments made by Labor when in government did not come to fruition." The absence of a lift has received significant local media coverage since that time.

Electronic ticketing, in the form of the Opal smartcard system, arrived at the station in 2014.

The lift access upgrade was finally completed in June 2023, which involved construction of a new footbridge and a lift to the island platform, linked by a lift at each side entrance to the station.

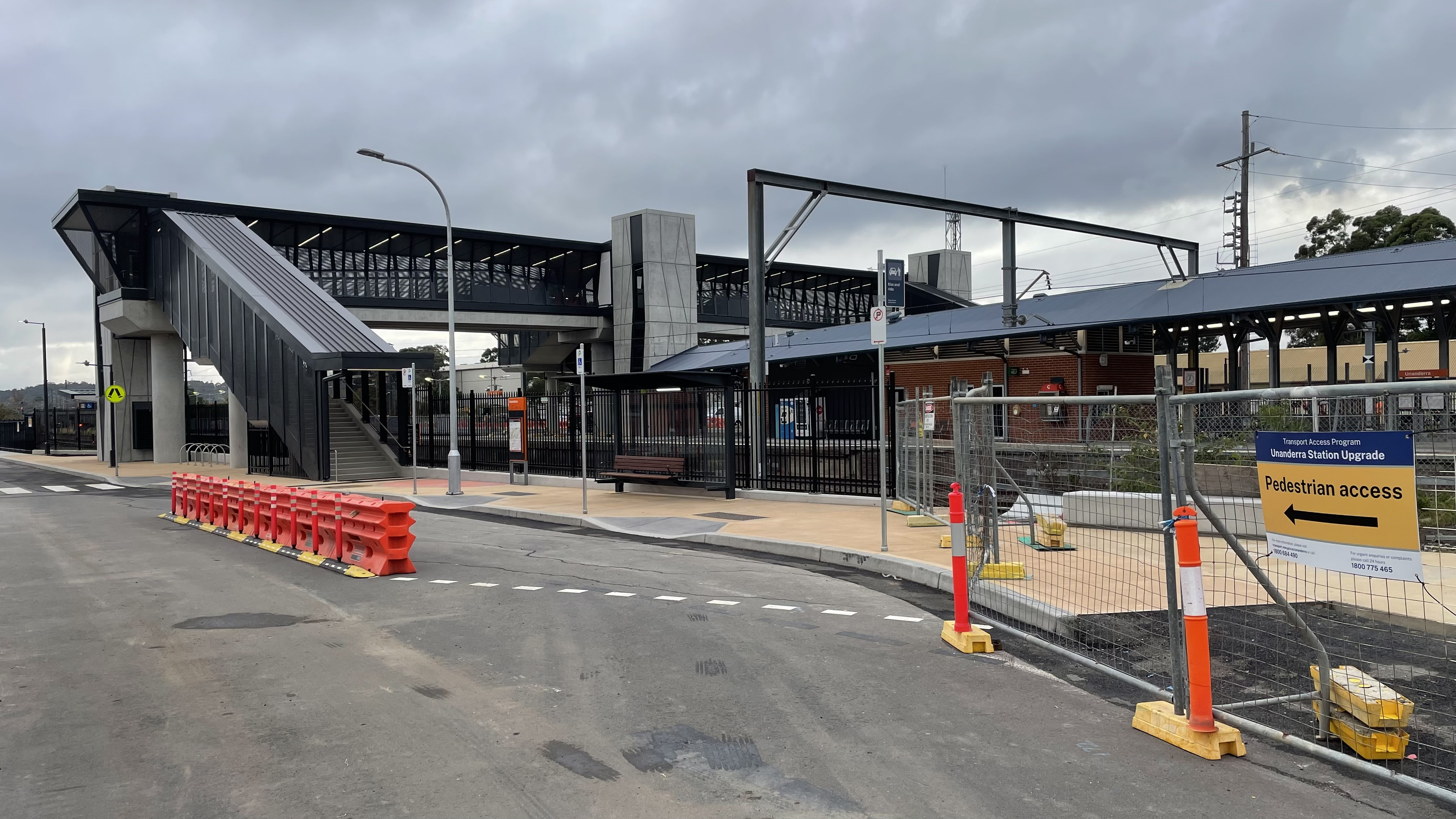
Western Entrance

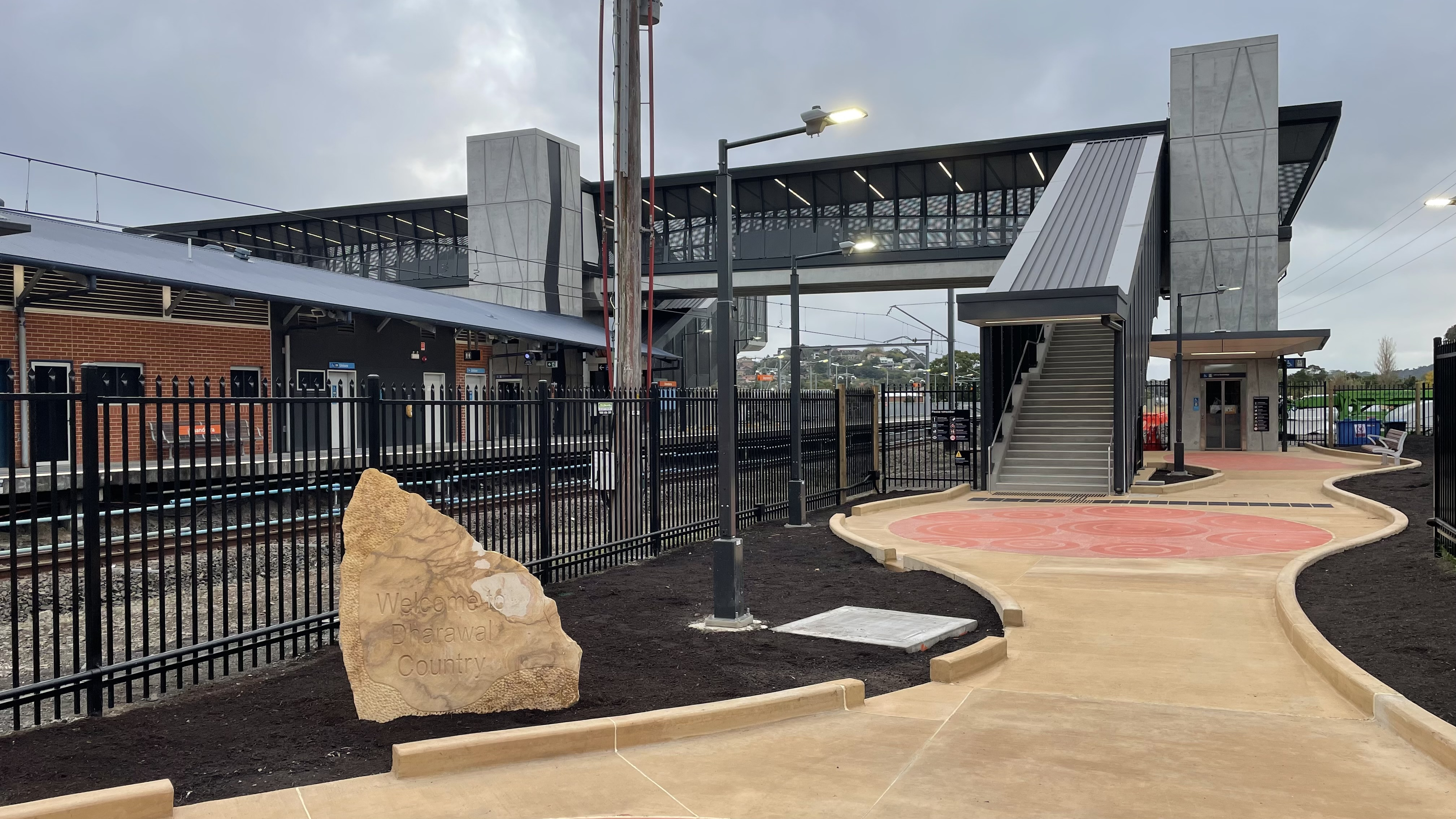
Eastern Entrance

== Platforms and services ==
Unanderra has one island platform with two side faces. It is serviced by Sydney Trains South Coast line services travelling between Sydney Central, Bondi Junction and Kiama. Unlike other New South Wales stations, Platform 2 is for Sydney bound services, with trains normally operating on the right-hand side of the platform rather than the left. Platform 1 is on the western side while Platform 2 is on the eastern side.

Platform	Line	Stopping pattern	Notes
1	South Coast Line	services to Kiama	
2	South Coast Line	services to Sydney Central & Bondi Junction	

== Transport links ==
Premier Illawarra operates seven bus routes via Unanderra station, under contract to Transport for NSW:

- 31: Wollongong to Horsley
- 33: Wollongong to Dapto
- 35: to Wollongong
- 36: Wollongong to Kembla Heights
- 37: Wollongong Beach to Wollongong station via Oak Flats & Shellharbour anti-clockwise loop
- 41: Dapto to University of Wollongong
- 57: Wollongong station to Wollongong Beach via Shellharbour & Oak Flats clockwise loop
