= Bowral railway station =

Railway station in New South Wales, Australia

Bowral
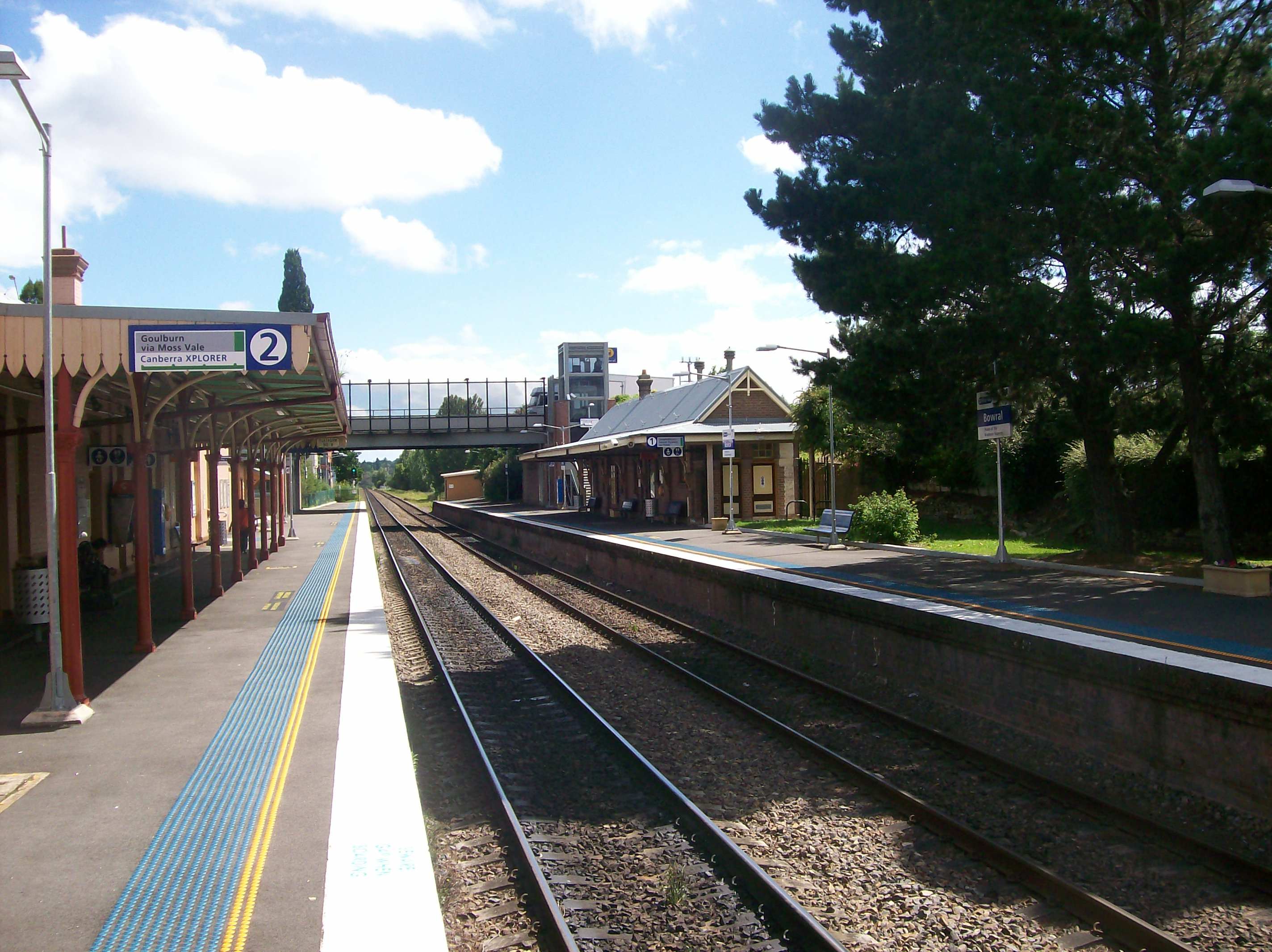
- Southbound view from Platform 2 in December 2011

General information
- Location: Station Street, Bowral; Australia
- Coordinates: 34°28′40″S 150°25′00″E
- Elevation: 673 metres (2,208 ft)
- Owner: Transport Asset Manager of New South Wales
- Operator: Sydney Trains and NSW TrainLink
- Line: Main Southern
- Distance: 136.34 kilometres (84.72 mi) from Central
- Platforms: 2 side
- Tracks: 2
- Connections: Bus

Construction
- Structure type: Ground
- Accessible: Yes

Other information
- Status: Weekdays: Staffed: 5.10am to 9.10pm: Weekends and public holidays: Staffed: 6.30am to 2.30pm
- Station code: BWL
- Website: Transport for NSW

History
- Opened: 2 December 1867

Passengers
- 2025: 122,127 (year); 335 (daily) (Sydney Trains, NSW TrainLink)

Services
Preceding station	Intercity Trains	Following station
Burradoo towards Moss Vale or Goulburn	Southern Highlands Line	Mittagong towards Campbelltown or Central
Preceding station	NSW TrainLink	Following station
Moss Vale towards Griffith or Canberra	NSW TrainLink Southern Line Griffith and Canberra Xplorers	Mittagong towards Sydney
Location

Bowral railway station is a heritage-listed railway station located on the Main Southern line in New South Wales, Australia. It serves the town of Bowral in the Southern Highlands region of New South Wales opening on 1 March 1867.

== Platforms and services ==
Bowral has two side platforms. It is serviced by Sydney Trains Southern Highlands Line services travelling between Campbelltown and Moss Vale with morning services to Sydney Central and evening services to Goulburn.

It is also serviced by NSW TrainLink Xplorer long-distance services from Sydney to Canberra and Griffith. This station is a request stop for this service, so the trains stop only if passengers are booked to board or alight here.

Platform	Line	Stopping pattern	Notes
1	Southern Highlands Line	services to Campbelltown morning services to Sydney Central (1 weekday, 2 weekend)	
1	Southern Region	services to Sydney Central	request stop (booked passengers only)
2	Southern Highlands Line	services to Moss Vale evening services to Goulburn (2 weekday, 1 weekend)	
2	Southern Region	services to Canberra and Griffith	request stop (booked passengers only)

== Transport links ==
Berrima Buslines operate five routes that serve Bowral station:

- 806 to Bargo via Mittagong
- 808 to Moss Vale via Robertson and Kangaloon (Loop Service)
- 811: Willow Vale to Moss Vale
- 816: Moss Vale Courthouse to Willow Drive and Argyle Street (Loop Service)

Berrima Buslines operate one route from Bowral station for NSW TrainLink:

- Loopline Bus: to Picton station

Bowral is also served by one NSW TrainLink coach service between Bundanoon and Wollongong in each direction.
