= Robertson railway station =

Railway station in New South Wales, Australia

Robertson
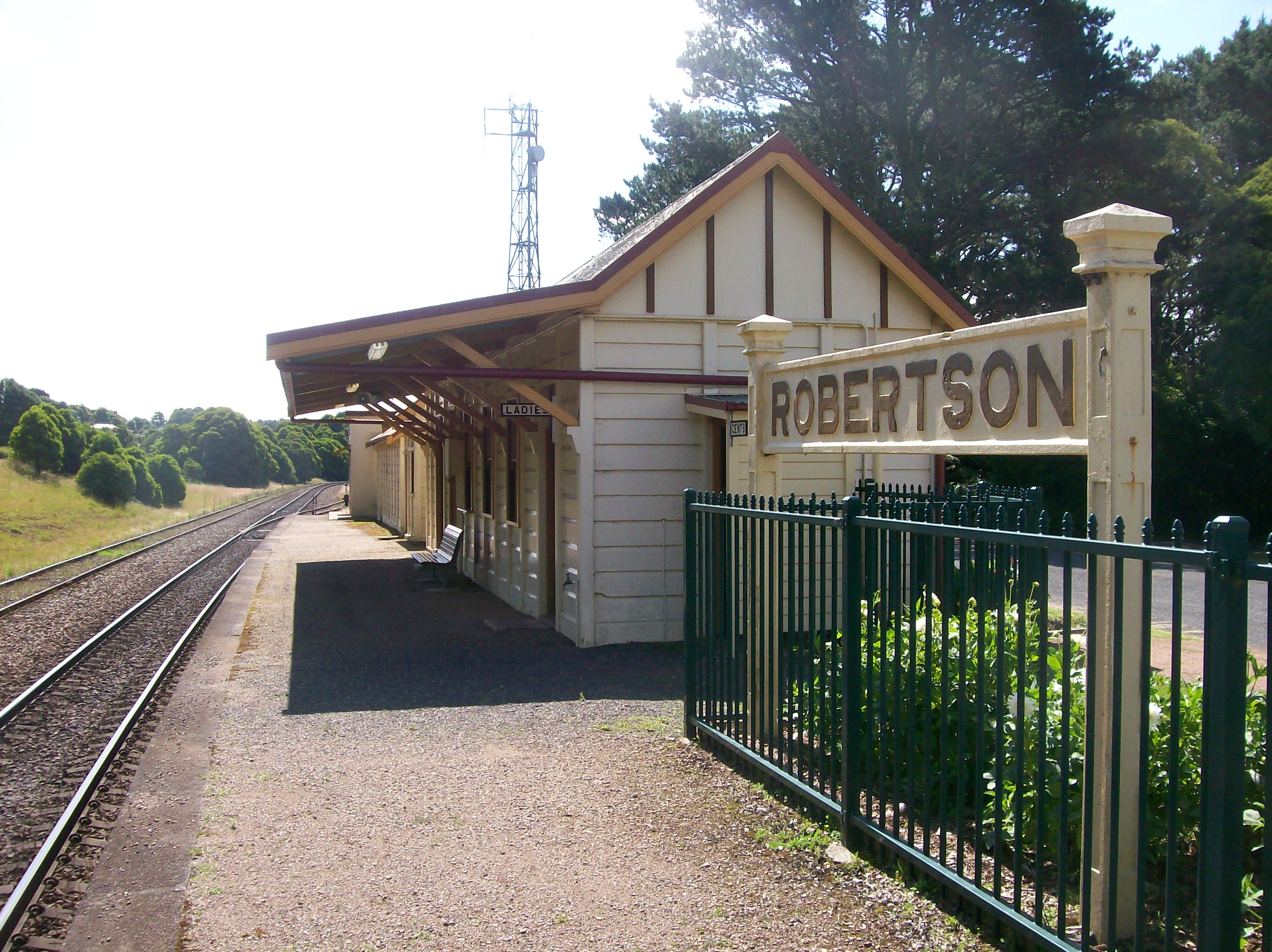

General information
- Location: Yarranga Street, Robertson; New South Wales; Australia
- Coordinates: 34.5910°S 150.5935°E
- System: Former railway station ← Mount Murray · Moss Vale →
- Owner: Transport Asset Manager of New South Wales
- Operator: Robertson Heritage Railway Station Committee
- Line: Unanderra–Moss Vale
- Distance: 128.38 km from Central
- Platforms: 1
- Tracks: 2
- Train operators: 3801 Limited

Construction
- Structure type: At-grade

History
- Opened: 20 August 1932
- Closed: 1991

Services
Excursion runs
Preceding station	East Coast Heritage Rail	Following station
Moss Vale Terminus	The Cockatoo Run	Unanderra towards Central
Moss Vale Terminus	The Cockatoo Run	Summit Tank One-way operation
Preceding station	Former services	Following station
Burrawang towards Moss Vale	Unanderra–Moss Vale Line	Ranelagh House towards Unanderra
Location
- Location within New South Wales

Robertson is a railway station in Robertson, New South Wales, on the Unanderra–Moss Vale railway line. The station opened in 1932 to connect the producers of south-western New South Wales with the new wharves at Port Kembla, with the single-track line featuring a passing loop near the village of Robertson. A station was built to serve the village, with trains running between the Southern Highlands and Wollongong. Passenger services were operated by the State Rail Authority and its predecessors until the route was replaced by coaches in 1991. The station building is of state heritage significance and is now cared for by the Robertson Heritage Railway Station Committee. Occasional tourist trains operated by 3801 Limited, such as the Cockatoo Run, call at the station.

The station is located on the main line. There is a still-operational passing loop opposite; a perway siding is located to the west.

== Image gallery ==
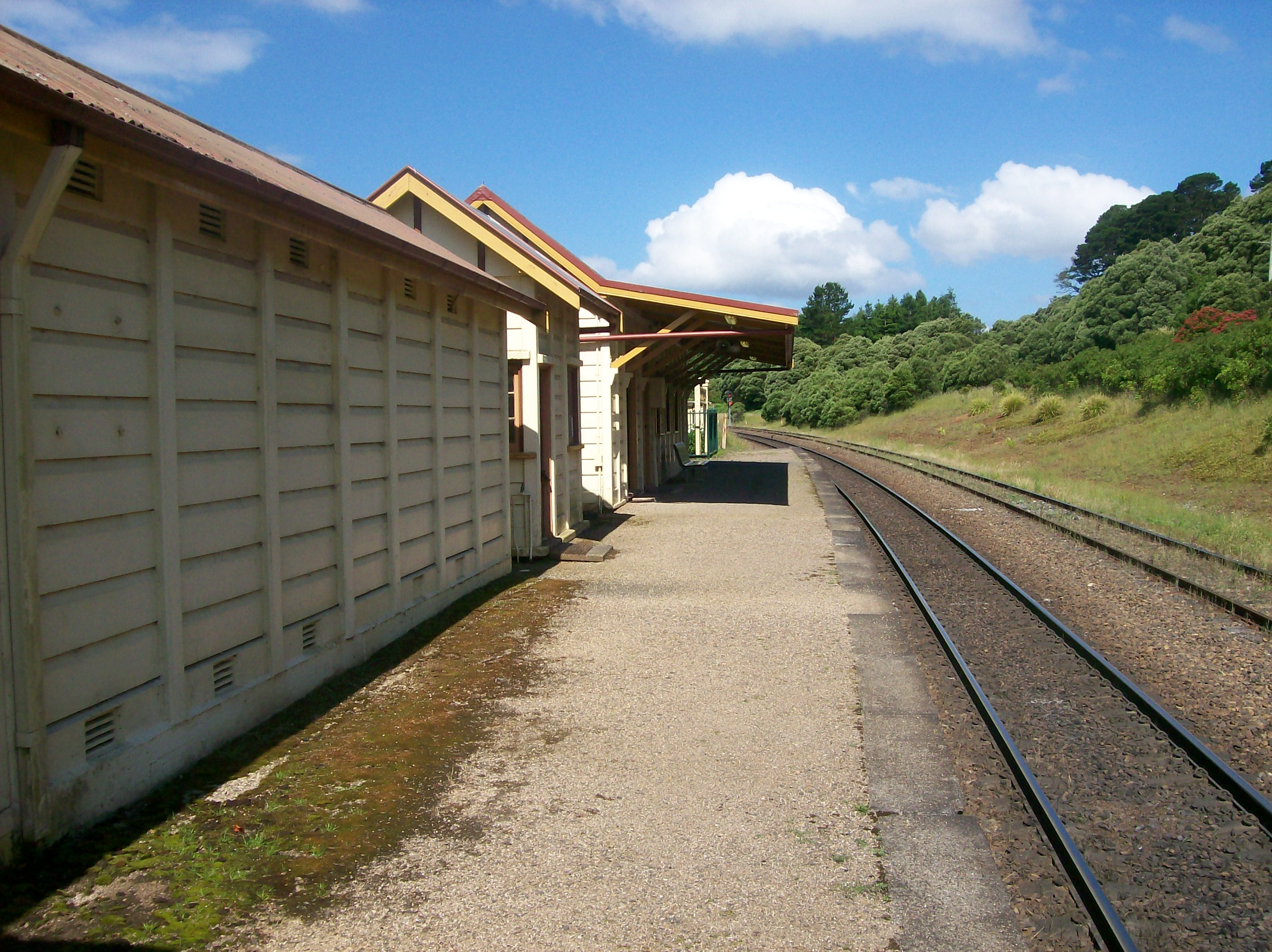
Platform looking east

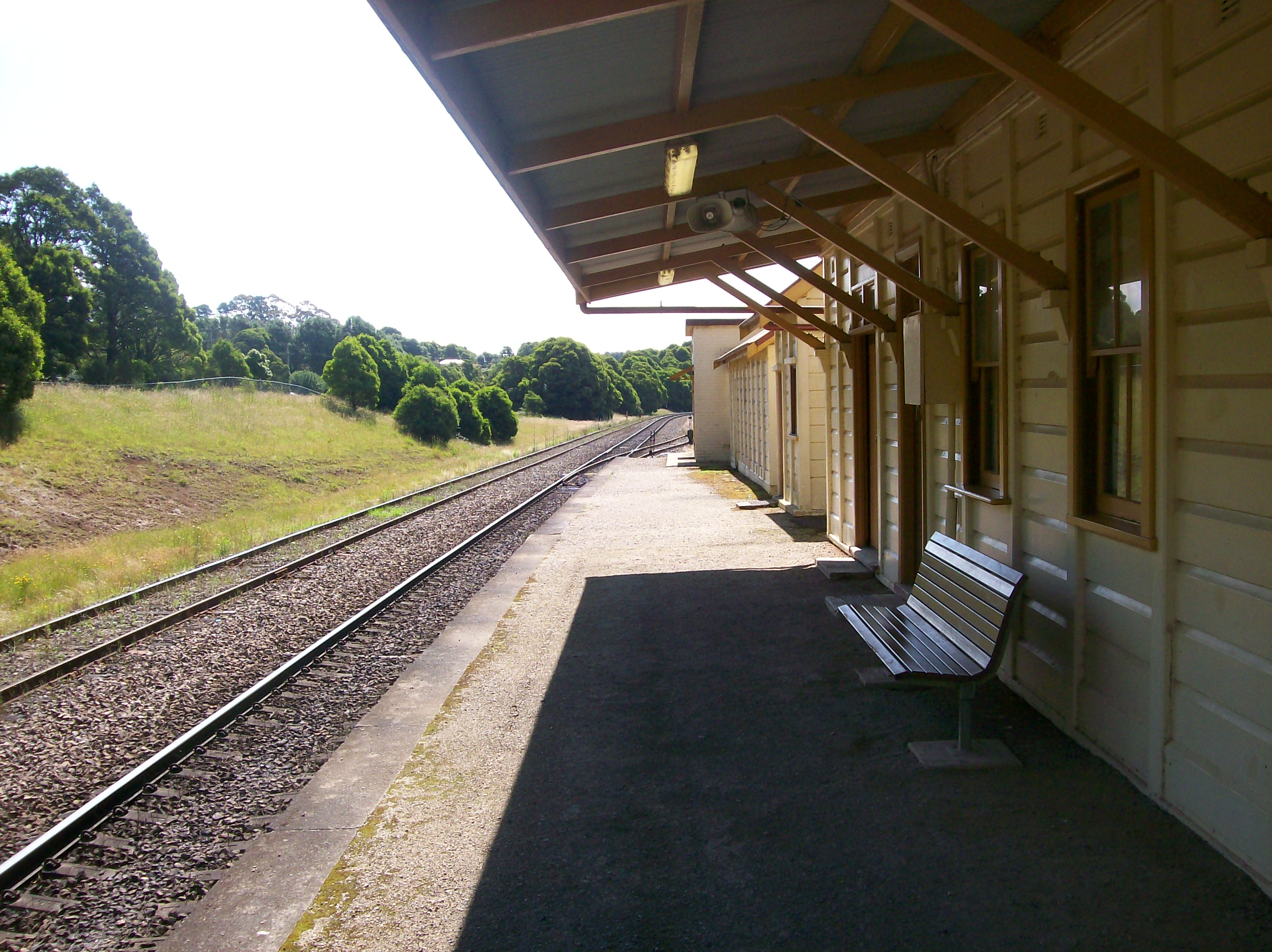
Platform looking west

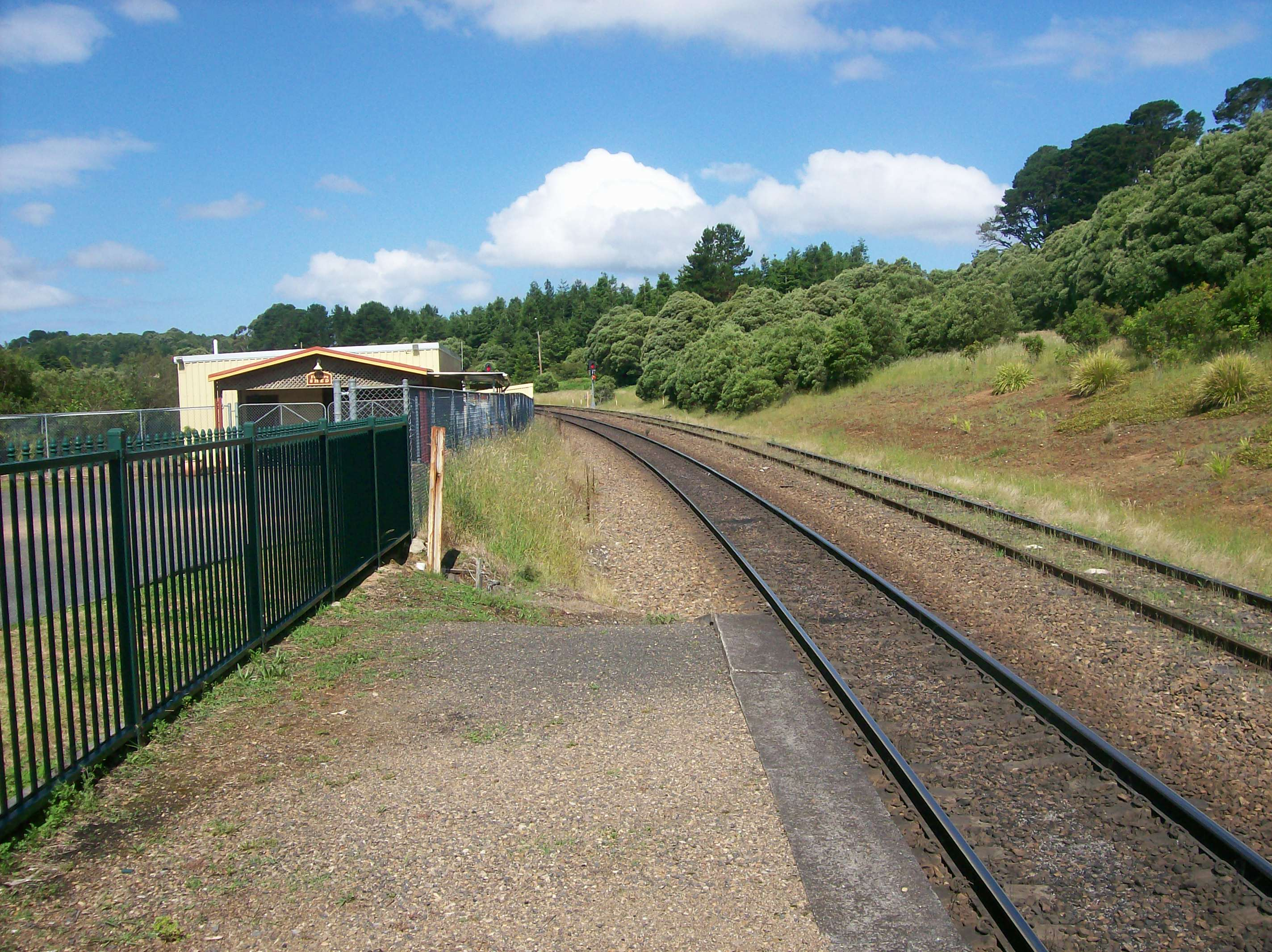
Unanderra (east) end of platform

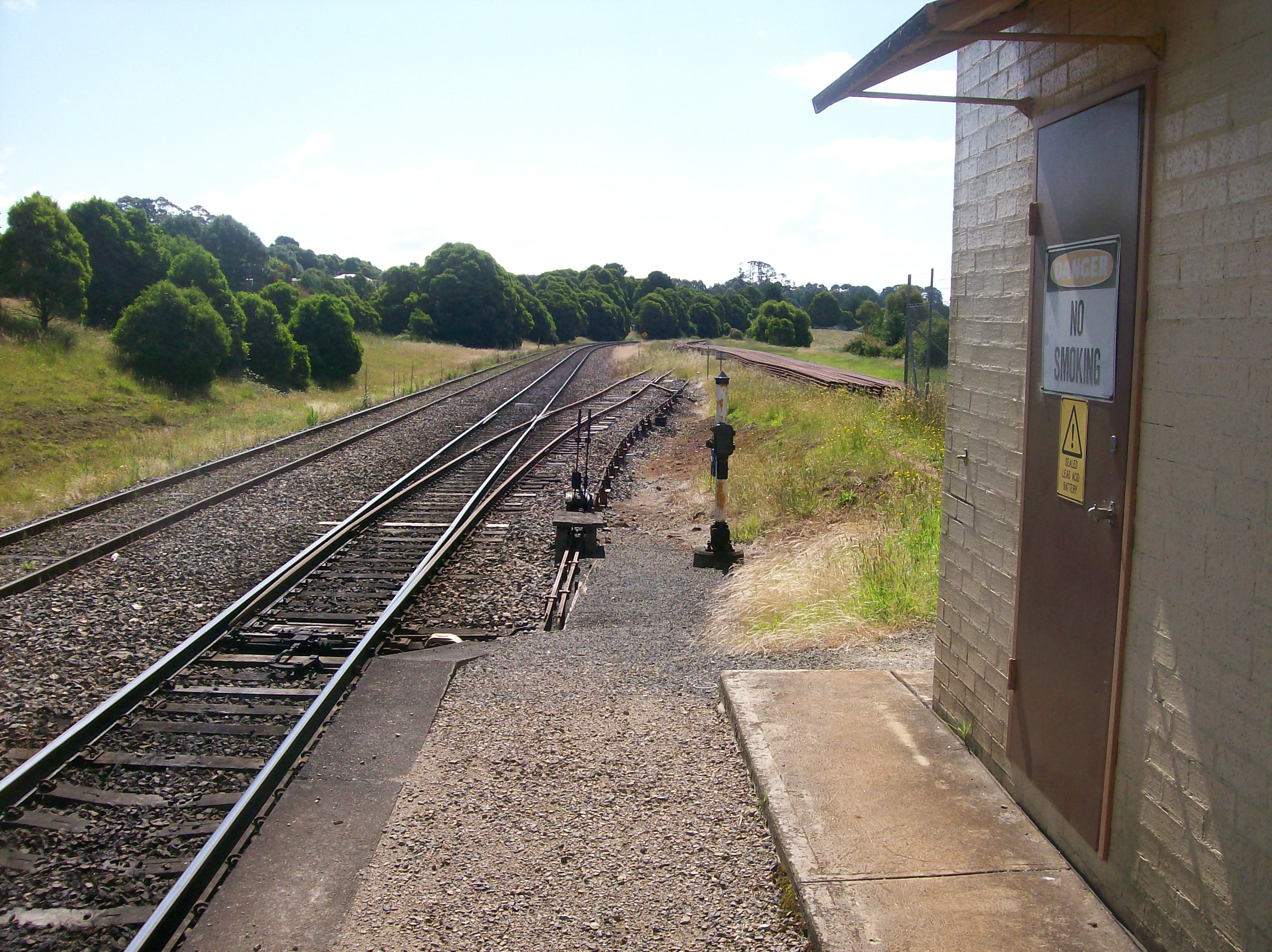
Moss Vale (west) end of platform

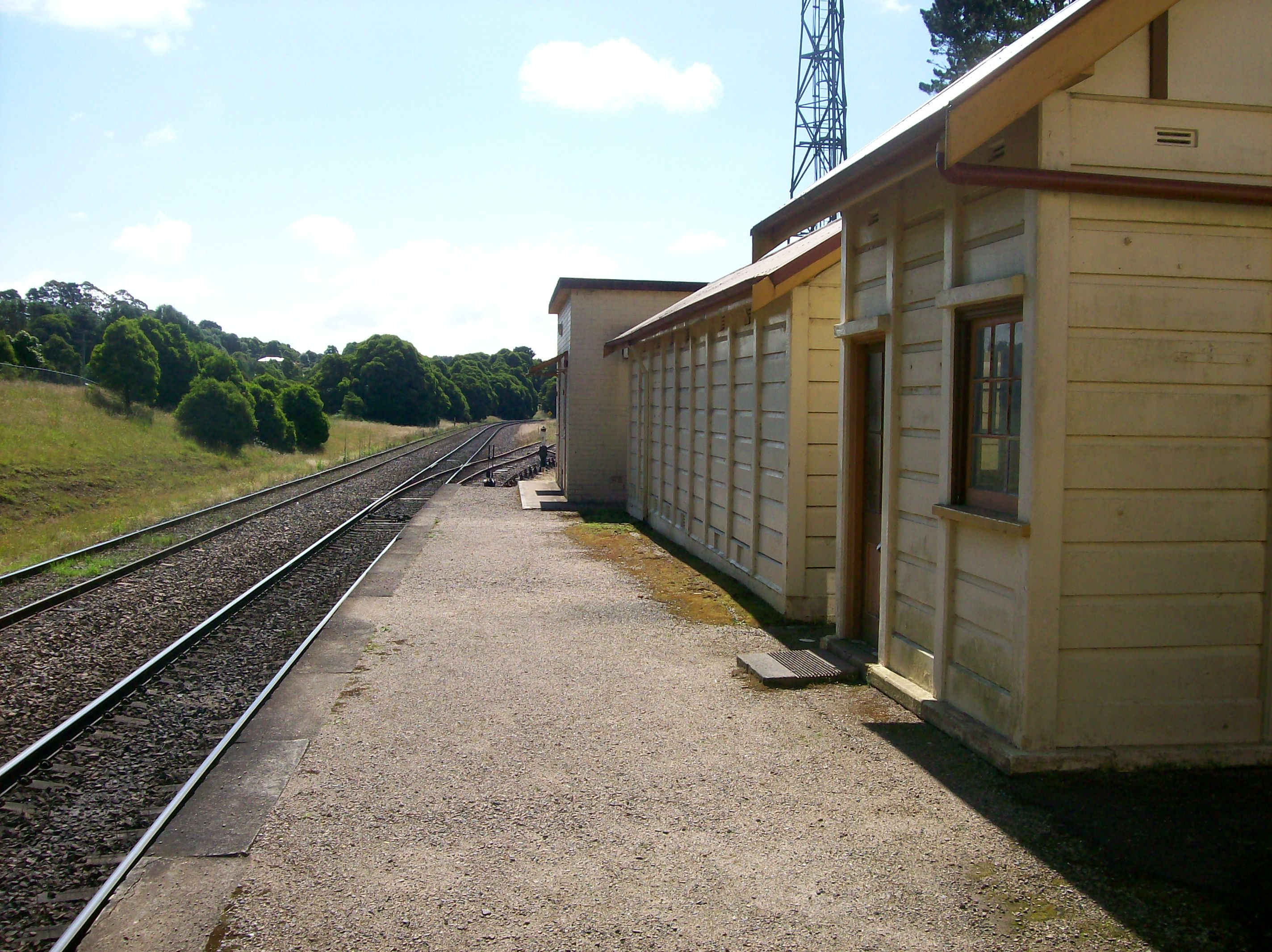
Looking to west end

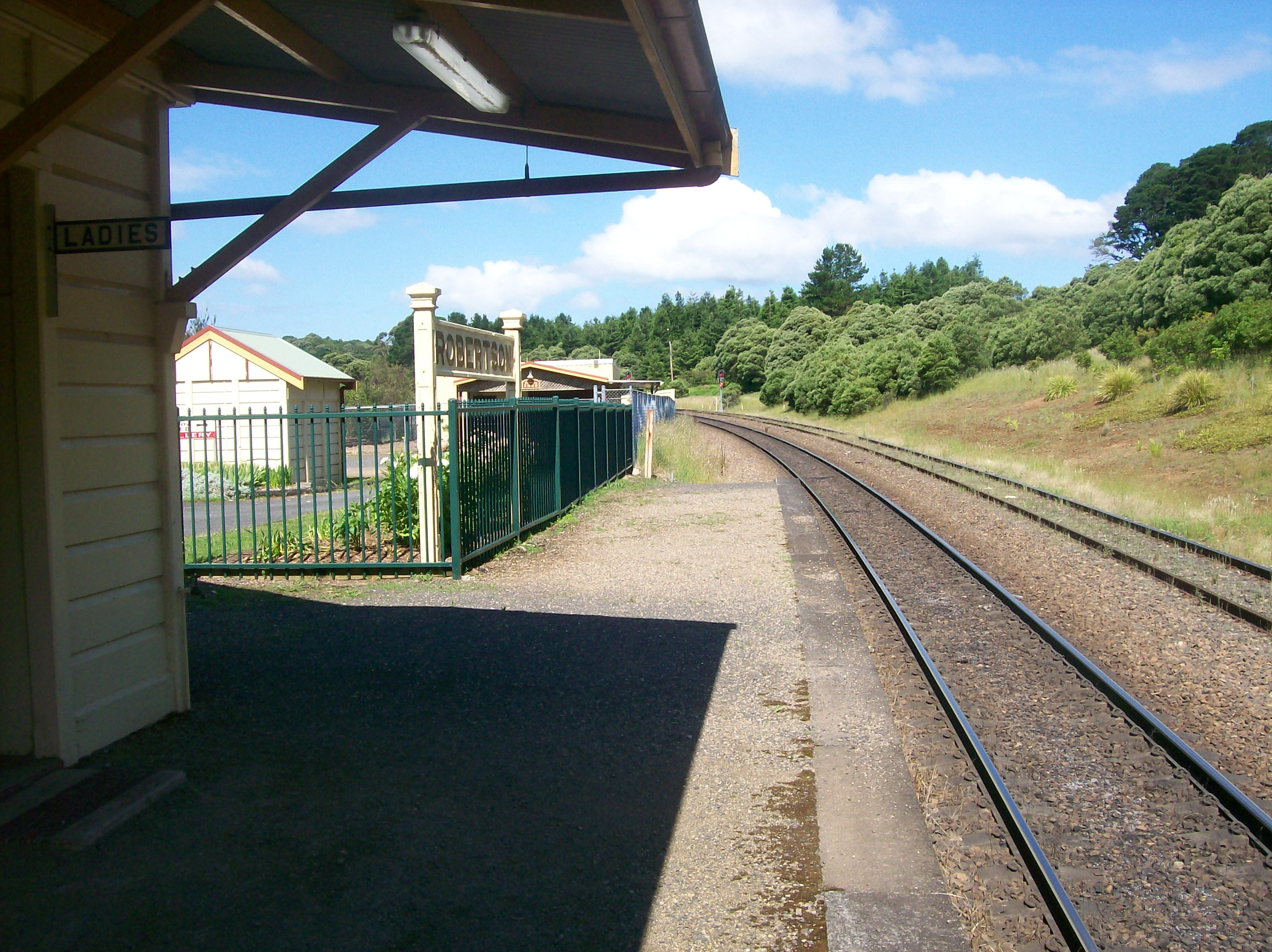
Looking to east end

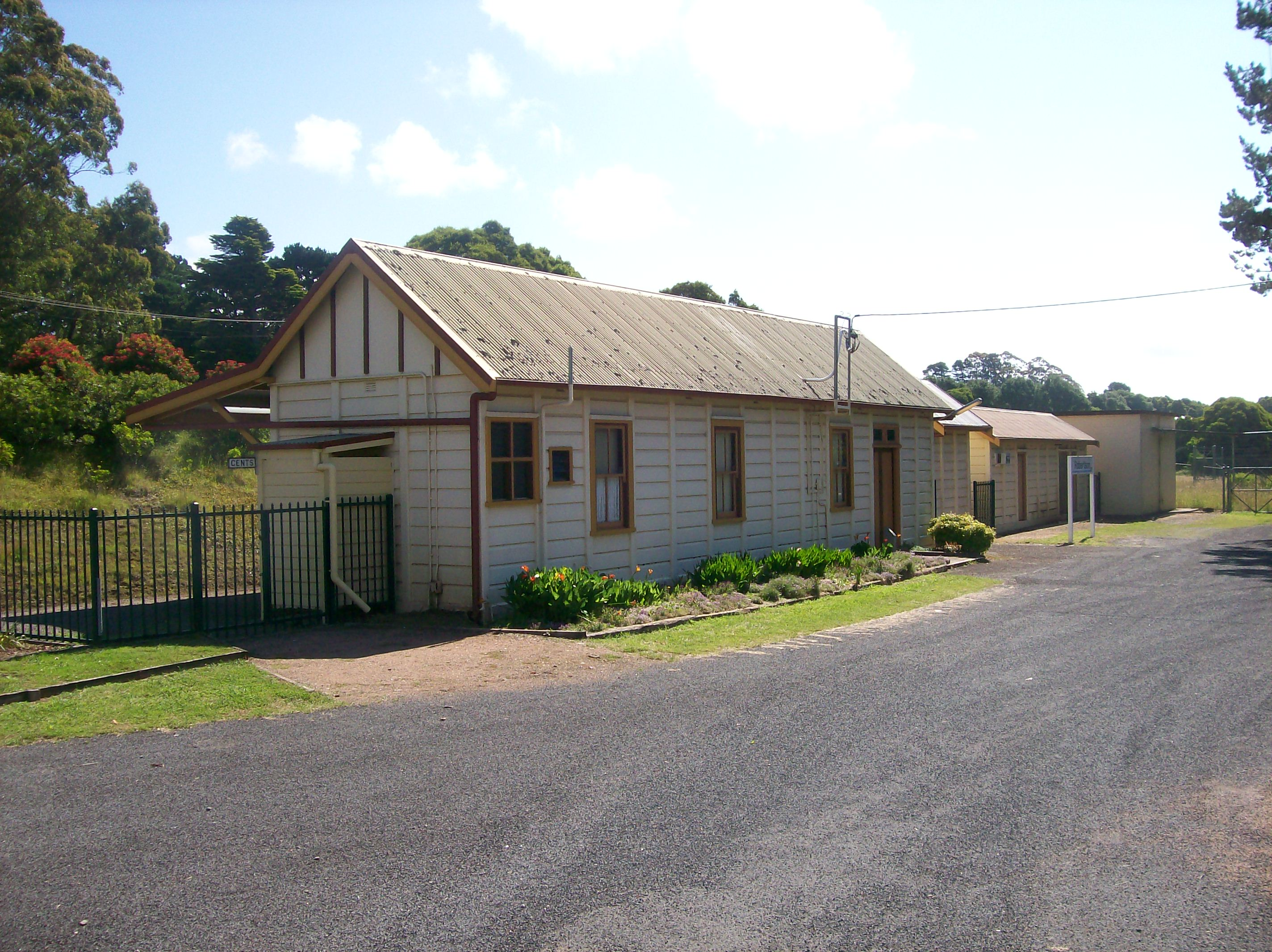
Exterior of station building view 1

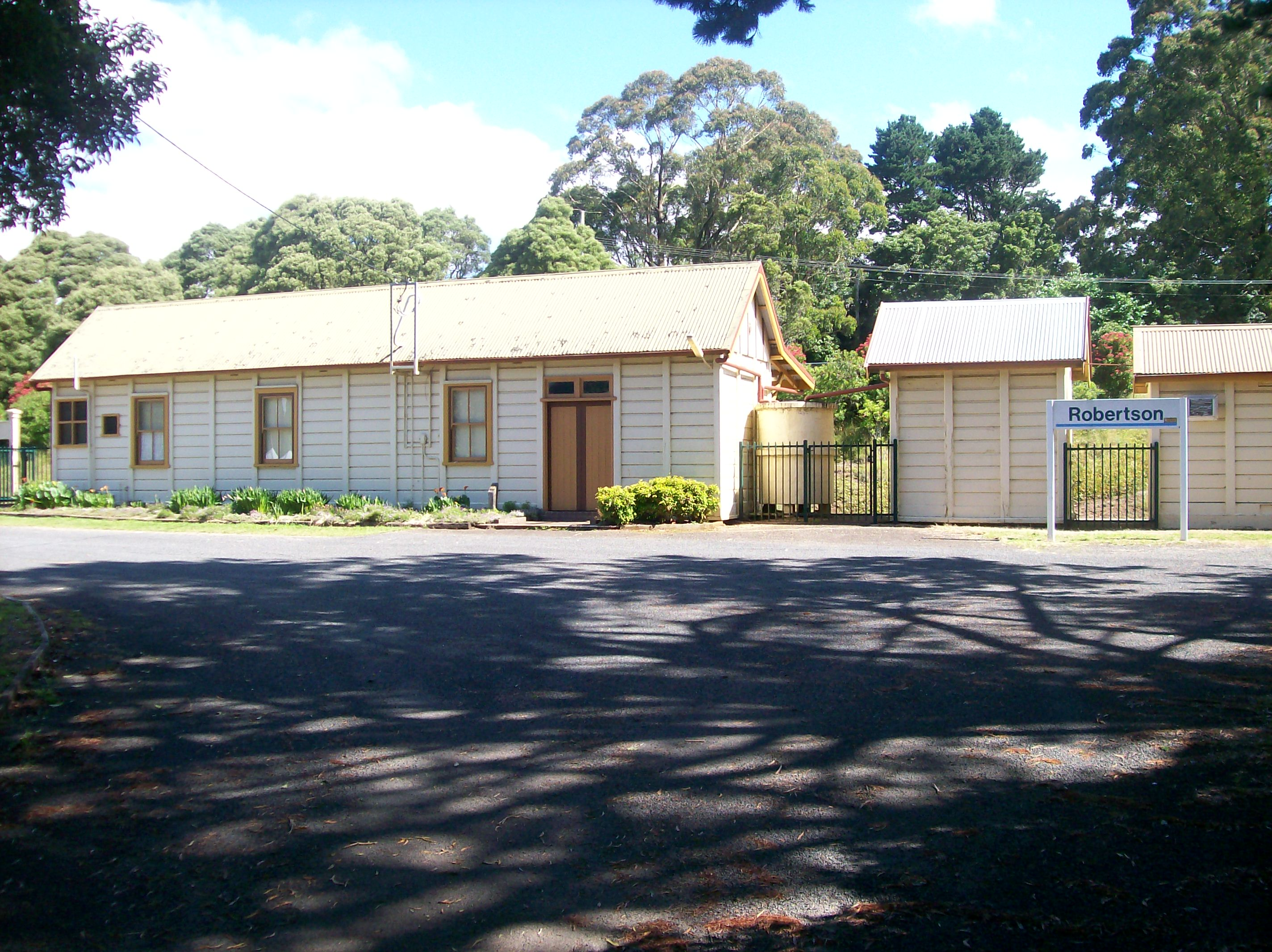
Exterior of station building view 2

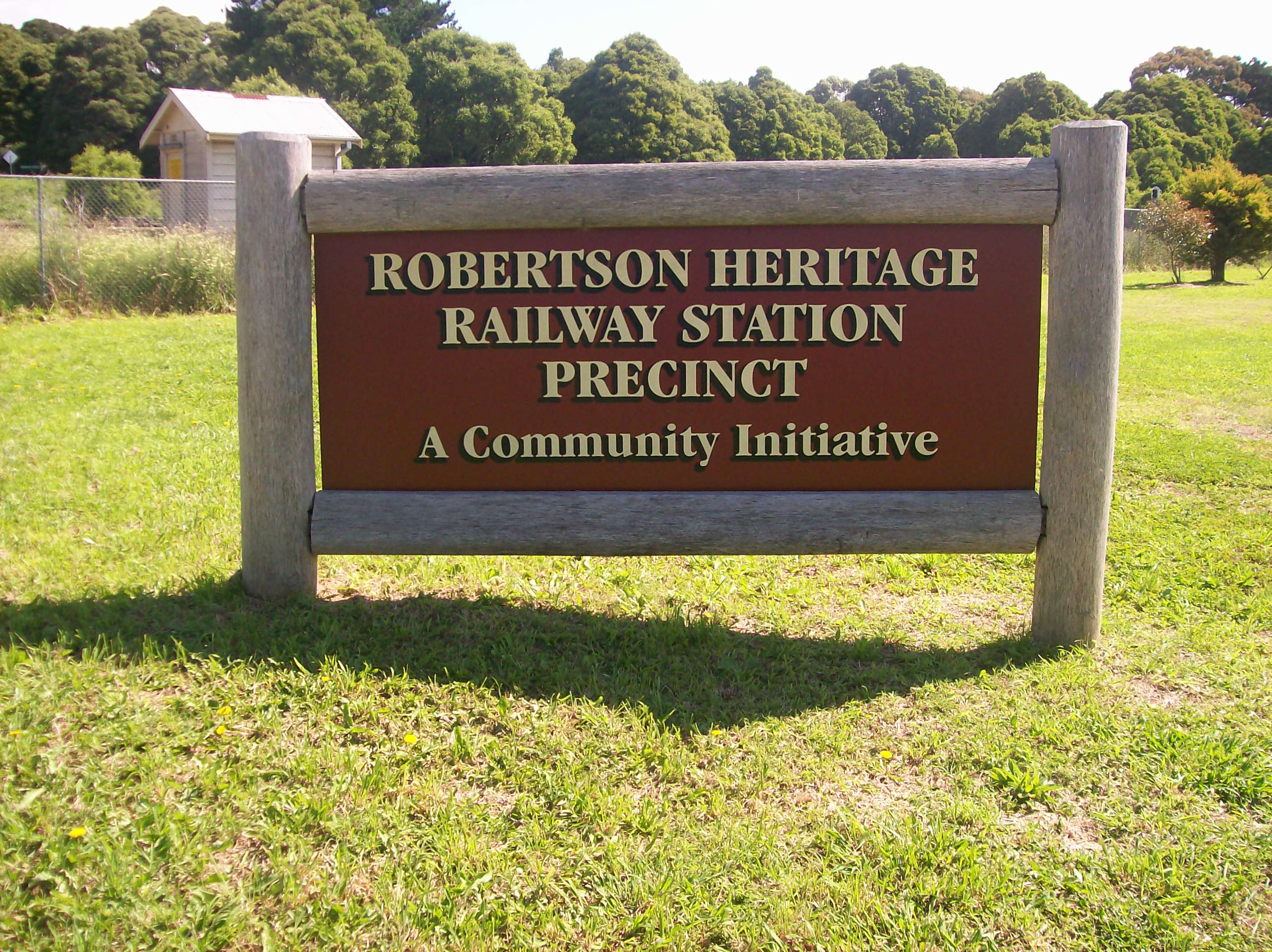
Heritage Precinct sign at entrance
