= Wollongong railway station =

Railway station in New South Wales, Australia

Wollongong
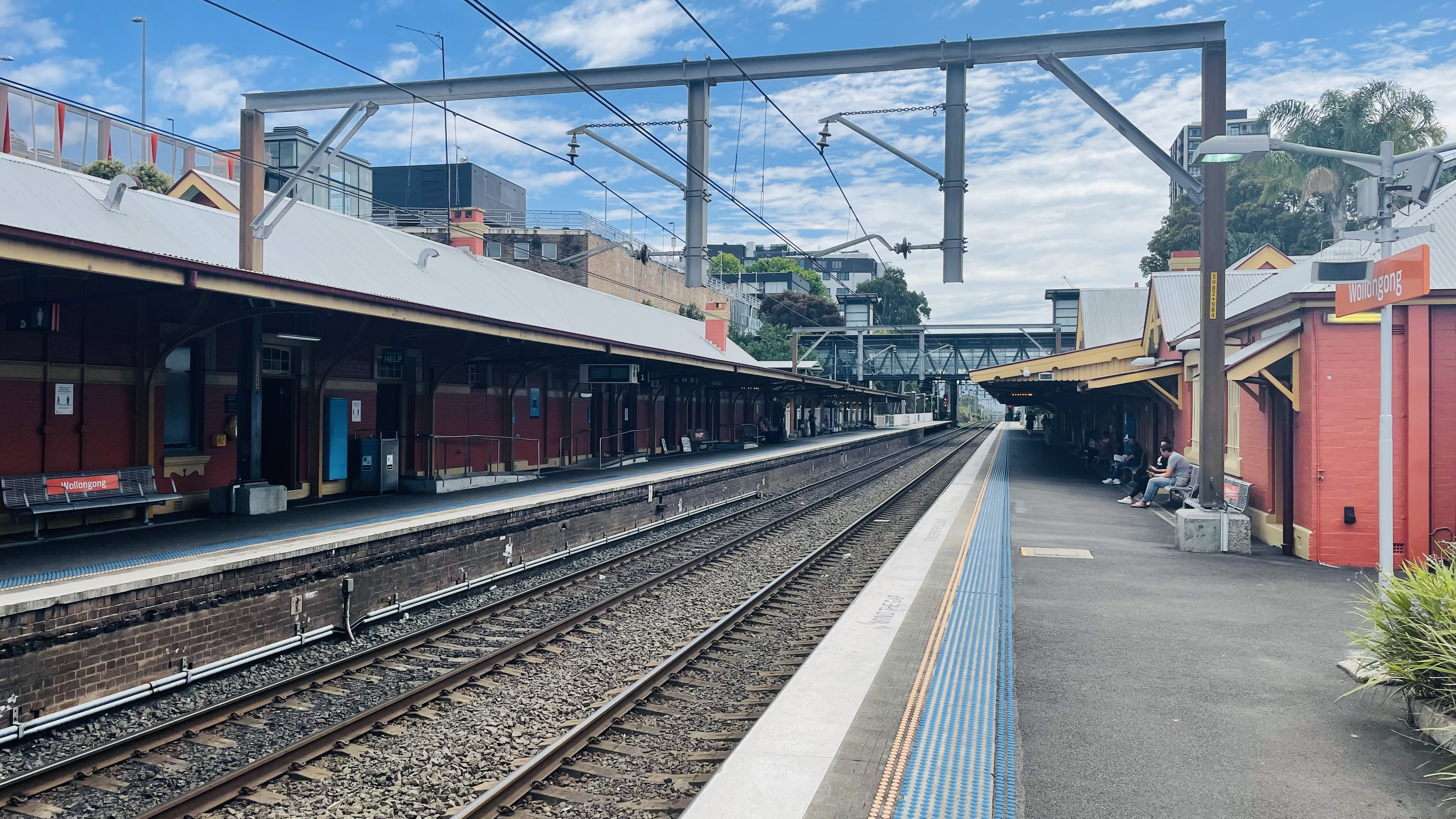
- Northbound view from Platform 2, October 2022

General information
- Location: Lowden Square, Wollongong; Australia
- Coordinates: 34°25′38″S 150°53′15″E
- Elevation: 17 metres (56 ft)
- Owner: Transport Asset Manager of New South Wales
- Operator: Sydney Trains
- Line: South Coast
- Distance: 82.92 kilometres (51.52 mi) from Sydney Central
- Platforms: 4 (2 side, 2 dock)
- Tracks: 2
- Connections: Bus

Construction
- Structure type: Ground
- Parking: Yes
- Cycle facilities: Yes
- Accessible: Yes

Other information
- Station code: WOL
- Website: Transport for NSW

History
- Opened: 21 June 1887

Passengers
- 2023: 1,004,540 (year); 2,752 (daily) (Sydney Trains, NSW TrainLink)

Services
Preceding station	Intercity Trains	Following station
Coniston towards Kiama or Port Kembla	South Coast Line	North Wollongong towards Central or Bondi Junction
Excursion runs
Preceding station	East Coast Heritage Rail	Following station
Unanderra towards Moss Vale	The Cockatoo Run	Thirroul towards Central
Location

Wollongong railway station is a heritage-listed railway station on the South Coast railway line in New South Wales, Australia. It serves the central business district of Wollongong. It was added to the New South Wales State Heritage Register on 2 April 1999.

== History ==
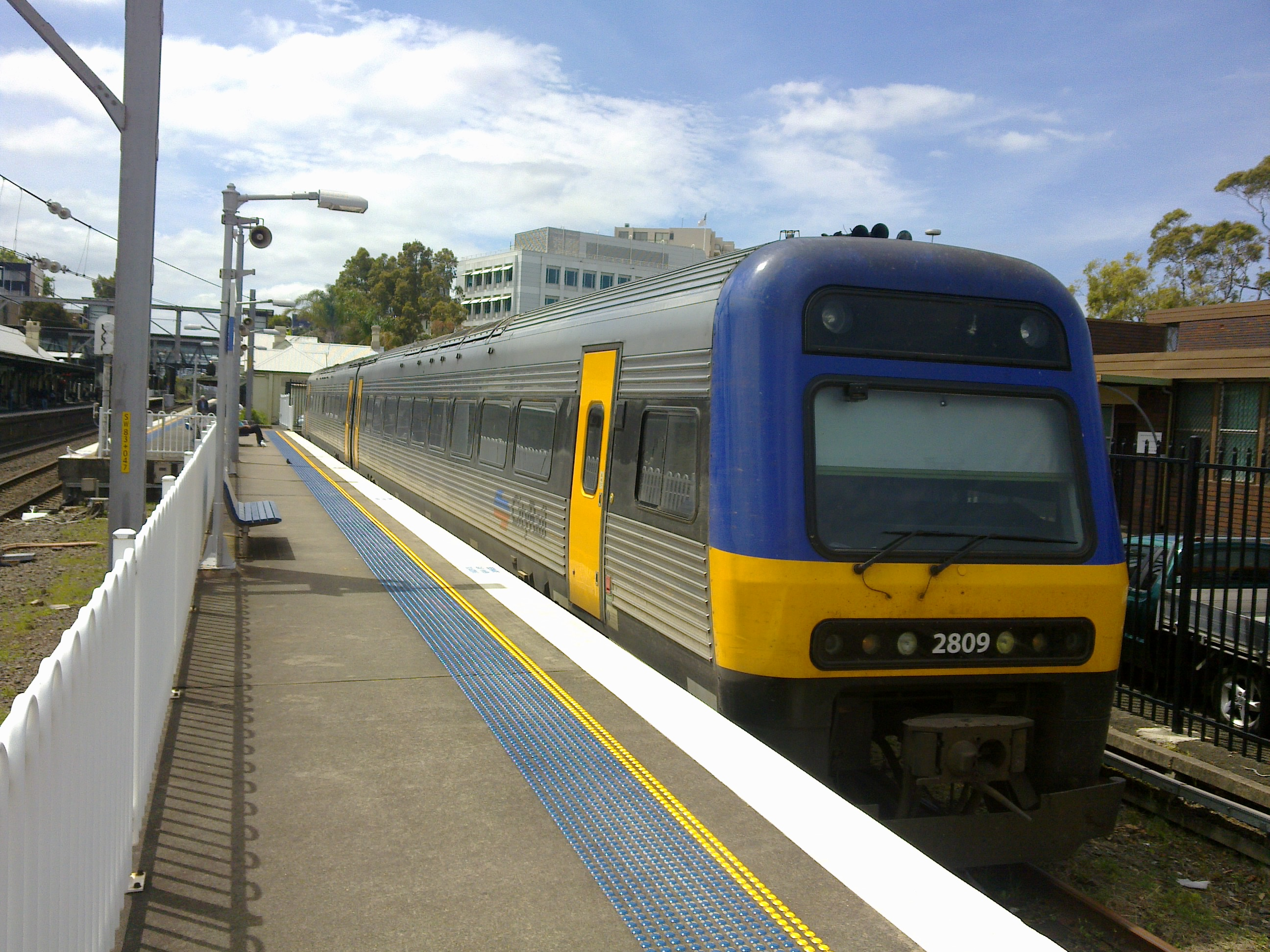
Endeavour railcar at the eastern dock platform

The original Wollongong railway station (Platform 2) was constructed in 1887. The Platform 2 refreshment room, which is still in use today, was constructed in 1890. The Platform 1 station and refreshment room were constructed in 1923 and 1926 respectively.

The single-track line opened on 21 June 1887 with an extension to Bombo opened on 9 November 1887 and finally on 3 October 1888 the connection to the northern Sydney section was made. Due to its busy coal industries and The Port of Wollongong, Wollongong Station was regarded as the major station on the Illawarra line and it remains that to the present due to the growth of Port Kembla, the steelworks and the major population.

The first station building on the Down platform was a standard roadside brick 3rd class building which was joined in 1890 by a brick waiting room with a railway refreshment room and following duplication of the line in 1923, a similar brick combination refreshment room building was erected on the Up platform. The station yard initially supported a major goods yard and small loco depot in 1910 but following duplication the yard was remodelled and enlarged with bigger storage and loco facilities and as such remained until 1962, with conversion to diesel loco operations and again in 1985 when the goods yard was closed and sidings were rearranged for additional carriage storage.

An early undated plan for the Up (west) platform building shows (north to south): urinals with a screen wall; lavatory; ladies room; general waiting room; booking hall; booking office; bar; refreshment room; and kitchen. Plans dated 1889 show replanning of the Down platform building to incorporate a refreshment room, kitchen and sitting room and yard at its southern end. 1914 plans show the Down platform building with internal plan (north to south): urinals, ladies toilet, ladies room, Station Master's office, telegraph office and porch, entry hall (new doors to east noted); parcels office to be converted to a general waiting room; refreshments room with kitchen and store to the east; dining room and sitting room.

1914 plans for "Proposed alterations to buildings and booking office" also show a "Proposed booking and parcels office" to the east of the down platform building, a Station Master's residence to southeast of the overbridge, a milk shed to the south of the down platform building, and a weatherboard building opposite on the west side of the line with a carriage shed to the southwest.

1922 plans of station layout show: Station Master's residence southeast of overbridge; 100,000-gallon reservoir to south of Station Master's residence; separate booking office and parcels office building to south of that; Down platform building interior plan with (north to south) toilets; ladies room, Station Master's office, telegraph office, hallway, waiting room, refreshments room with a larger now linked kitchen and store to east, and two unmarked rooms at the southern end. A horse and carriage dock and dock siding with adjacent water column are shown to the south of the Down platform building, with a milk shed and stage opposite on the western side of the lines. Another water column appears to the north of the Up platform building.

1926 plans for "Refreshment room Down Platform – Proposed additions" show a refreshment room addition with a bar, store and kitchen, also having a concrete coal bin.

1940 plans for a "Proposed new parcels office" show demolition of the earlier separate parcels and booking office, as well relocation of a lamp room to the north end of the Down platform building, and the construction of a new parcels office east of the Down platform building. A proposed future footbridge is mentioned on these plans. Some minor internal changes to the Down platform building are also shown at this time.

1977 plans for "Upgrading of Station building Up platform "show internal changes to booking office and waiting room, including removal of partition walls, new openings.

1984 plans show the front gable and verandas on the east elevation of the Down platform building demolished, and construction of new parcels office building adjacent to overbridge on the east platform. 1984 plans also show upgrading of the Up platform station building with a new toilet fitout, internal refurbishment, and demolition of timber buildings at the northern end. Plans for "Upgrading of station buildings Down platform" show internal refurbishment. The plans also show classrooms and offices at the southern end; external repairs and minor alterations.

1985 plans show alterations to booking offices for both up and down platform buildings.

In 1986, the line was electrified as far as Wollongong, and a plaque to commemorate the electrification was unveiled at Wollongong Station by the then Premier Neville Wran on 4 February 1986.

1994 plans for a general upgrade show a range of alterations including a few new doors and internal refurbishment to both platform buildings. Extensive removal of internal ceilings and some floors are shown. The glazed gable was added to the down platform building, new lifts and footbridge.

1999 plans for Wollongong Station upgrade show further extensive internal changes to both platform buildings, and the extensive addition of new platform canopies, and a new awning over the footbridge. At this time the building to the north of the east (down) platform building is marked as "Existing train crew building". Plans for new steel framed lift towers are dated November 1999. Also on the 1999 plans, a new addition is shown to the west elevation (south end) of the Down platform building.

The station is now one of the few left in N.S.W. that retains a functioning railway refreshment rooms.

In August 2002, a new footbridge with lifts opened. On 14 August 2010, in addition to its original car park, a new commuter car park which provides 365 free car spaces including disabled and motorcycle parking, as well as bicycle storage, was opened.

== Platforms and services ==
Wollongong has two side platforms serviced by Sydney Trains South Coast line services travelling between Sydney Central, Bondi Junction and Kiama, as well as local services from Waterfall and Thirroul to Port Kembla. Peak hour services terminate at Wollongong with carriages stabled in sidings south of the station.

Two south-facing dock platforms are occasionally used by Endeavour railcar services. These were used by CPH railmotor services from Moss Vale until these ceased in September 1985 and following electrification of the line from Sydney, by diesel railcar services from the south.

Platform	Line	Stopping pattern	Notes
1	SCO	services to Thirroul, Waterfall, Sydney Central & Bondi Junction	
2	SCO	services to Port Kembla & Kiama	
3	Dock platform		
4	Dock platform	Used for overnight stabling of Kiama-Bomaderry Endeavour set	

== Transport links ==
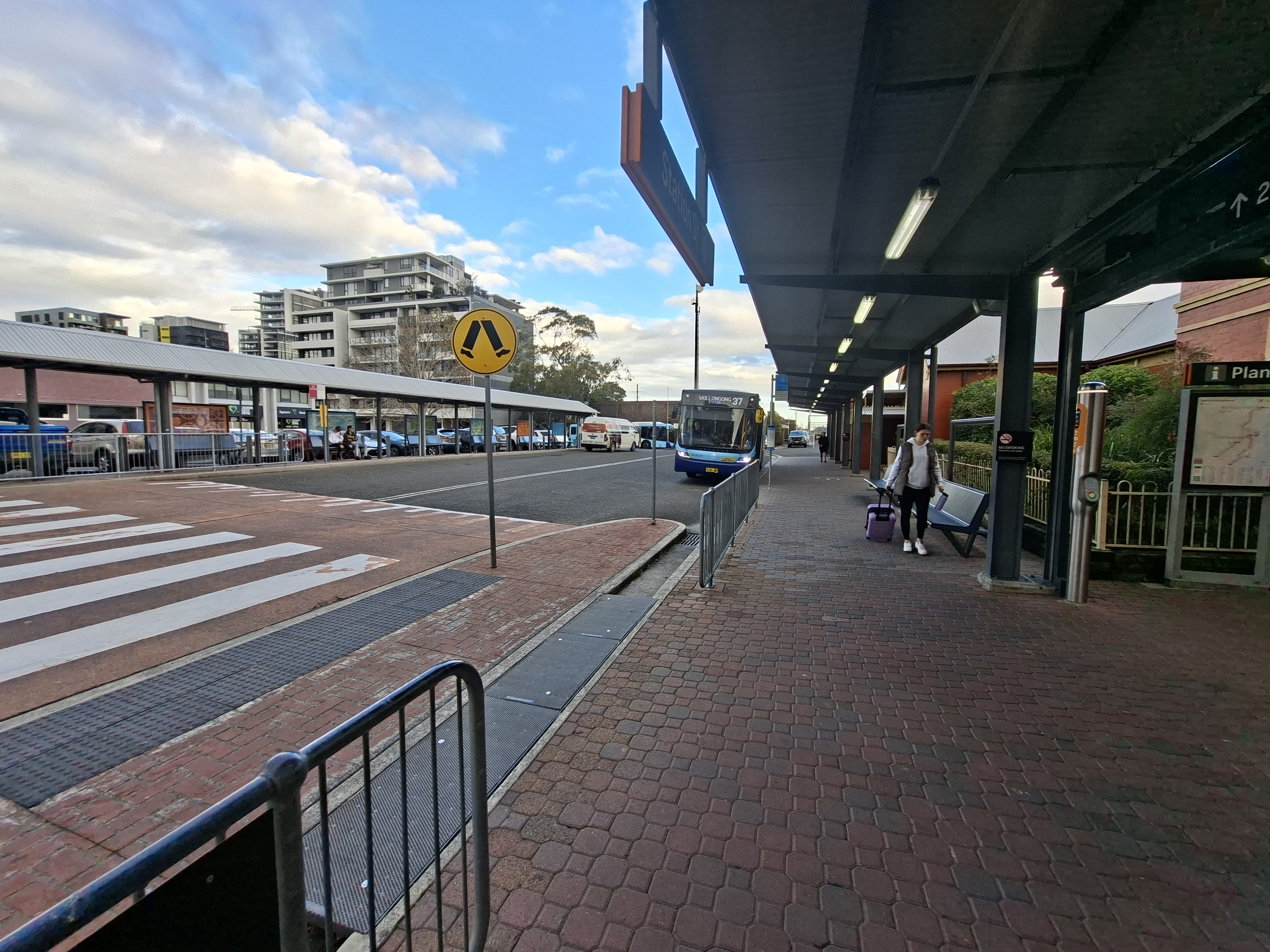
Bus stop area on eastern side of station

Busabout operates one bus route to and from Wollongong, under contract to Transport for NSW:

- 887: to Campbelltown via Appin

NSW TrainLink operates coach services to Moss Vale and Bundanoon

Premier Illawarra operates six bus routes via Wollongong station, under contract to Transport for NSW:

- 34: to Port Kembla
- 37: to Wollongong Beach via Oak Flats & Shellharbour anti-clockwise loop
- 51: Wollongong University to Albion Park
- 53: Wollongong University to Oak Flats station
- 57: to Wollongong Beach via Shellharbour & Oak Flats clockwise loop
- 65: North Beach to Port Kembla station

Premier Motor Service coach services between Sydney and Eden also call at Wollongong station.

== Description ==
The station complex includes the Platform 1 Building (1923) and Refreshment room (1926), the Platform 2 Building (1887), Refreshment room (1890) and Brick sheds (c. 1970s) and Train Crew Building (c. 1950s), the two platforms, footbridge (2005), platform canopies (2005), Crown Street overbridge (1928) and weighbridge.

Wollongong Railway Station is located between Station Street (to the east) and Gladstone Avenue, accessed off Lowden Street to the west. There are car parks off Station Street and Lowden Street. The station has two perimeter platforms on the east and west sides, and two single storey platform buildings. Access between the platforms is provided via a 2005 covered footbridge with ramps and lifts. The station's perimeter is defined by white powder-coated aluminium fencing.

Platform 1 Building (1923)

A single-storey platform building with English bond painted brick walls with a projecting brick base, and a corrugated steel gabled roof with roughcast stuccoed imitation half-timbered gable ends. Gable ends also features rectangular timber louvred vents. The roof has two painted brick chimneys with rendered caps and flat concrete hoods. The platform awning has a skillion corrugated steel roof and curved steel brackets. Windows are timber-framed double-hung with sandstone reveals.

Platform 1 Refreshment Room (1926)

A small building with a gabled corrugated steel roof and timber panelled double doors.

Internally, it has decorative cornices and ceiling roses, and decorative plaster brackets to the interior ceiling, and a timber panelled counter.

Platform 2 Brick Sheds (c. 1970s)

Two small c. the 1970s painted brick single-storey buildings at the southern end of platform used as a storeroom and electrical depot.

Platform 2 Building (1887)

A single-storey building in English bond painted brick with a rendered base to the walls, timber valance to the cantilevered awning, timber-framed double-hung windows, steel trusses and curved brackets to the awning. Timber panelled doors with fanlights and sidelights. The gabled section over the main entry. The main entry has modern timber panelled double doors, each with glazed panels to upper halves, and modern tiled floor. There are rendered surrounds to each window, and projecting string courses above window height. There is a modern awning to the station entry. The building has two painted brick chimneys with brick strapwork. One bay south of the entry, on the street side of the building, has a parapet.

Platform 2 Refreshment Room (1890)

This is a stretcher bond painted brick extension to the southern end of the 1887 building and executed in a similar style. This extension has a rendered base to the walls, hipped and a gabled corrugated steel roof. Windows are timber-framed double-hung, placed in pairs. Doors are timber panelled double doors, some with glazed panels to the upper half. The gable end facing east has a Perspex roof and decorative timber bargeboards and pendant.

Train Crew Building (c. 1950s)

A freestanding weatherboard building towards the north end of Platform 2. The building has a hipped corrugated steel roof, with a flat metal deck roof over a section on the western side of the building. The building features timber framed double hung windows with horizontal glazing bars, and a cantilevered platform awning on steel brackets, and timber flush doors.

It is possible that this building contains the remnants of an earlier lamp room.

Platforms

Two perimeter platforms, both extended at the northern end, with brick faces and asphalt surfaces.

Footbridge (2005)

A covered concrete footbridge with covered ramps and lifts and each end.

Platform Canopies (2005)

Modern platform canopies with steel posts on concrete bases and corrugated steel skillion roofs connecting the platform buildings to the lifts.

Crown Street Overbridge (1928)

Three span bridge with a jack arch superstructure (RSJ with concrete infill) supported on masonry (brick) piers.

Weighbridge

A small weighbridge with a modern hut is located in the yard.

Landscape/Natural Features

Small garden to the east of the Platform 2 building, facing Station Street. The garden has a white powder-coated aluminium fencing and contains a plaque commemorating electrification of the line in 1986.

Moveable Items

Timber rollover indicator boards on platform; plaque in the garden to the east of the Platform 2 building, facing the street, commemorating electrification of the line in 1986; plaque attached to west elevation of Platform 2 building commemorating 2002 development of Wollongong Station.

Condition and integrity

The Platform 1 and 2 buildings and refreshment rooms, the brick sheds, platforms and Crown Street Overbridge were reported as being in good condition at the time of the heritage listing, with the Train Crew Building in moderate condition.

There are alterations to all buildings, and it is clear the buildings have evolved, however basic form and external materials of the original form of the buildings is readable. The interiors of the buildings have been extensively altered. The station access arrangement has changed and loss of most features of the yard has resulted in the station context being diminished.

=== Modifications and dates ===
- 1890: railway refreshment room addition to Down platform building
- 1914: separate booking and parcels office (no longer extant) built to the east of Down platform building.
- Before 1922: milk shed and other structures.
- 1922: enlargement of kitchen and store adjacent to Down platform refreshment room.
- 1923: Up platform building constructed, duplication of the line.
- c. 1923: carriage shed built.
- 1926: brick refreshment room built onto Up platform building; enlargement of Down platform refreshment facilities.
- 1928: Crown Street overbridge constructed.
- 1940: New parcels and booking office east of Down platform building; demolition of former separate parcels & booking office (built 1914). Relocation of lamp room south of Down platform building.
- 1977: internal changes to Up platform building.
- 1984: front gable and verandas to east elevation of Down platform building demolished. New parcels office built adjacent to overbridge on Down platform. Internal refurbishment of Down platform building.
- 1985: alterations to internal fit-outs in booking offices of both platform buildings.
- 1986: electrification of the line to Wollongong.
- 1994: internal and some external alterations, both platform buildings. Glazed gable added to Down platform building.
- 1999–2005: new footbridge, lifts and platform canopies planned and constructed.
- 2009: Sellers turntable (1897) removed from the yard and relocated.
- unknown date: modern security screen doors, some modern flush doors, modern signage and seating to both platform buildings. Most yard structures (turntable excepted) have been removed.

== Heritage listing ==
Wollongong Railway Station – inclusive of the 1887 and 1923 Platform buildings, 1890 and 1926 refreshment rooms, train crew building, brick edged platforms, and moveable items – is an item of State heritage significance. Wollongong Railway Station is of State historical significance as the most substantial and earliest station on this section of the Illawarra line. Wollongong Railway Station is of historical significance as the place where construction of this originally isolated section of the line from Scarborough to Bombo commenced, materials having been shipped from Sydney to Wollongong in 1887. The Wollongong Railway Station platform buildings are of aesthetic significance as fine representative examples of railway station buildings dating from 1887 to 1926 and later, including 1887 brick 3rd class platform building and a 1923 brick building, with the rare inclusion of refreshment room additions to both platform buildings.

Wollongong railway station was listed on the New South Wales State Heritage Register on 2 April 1999 having satisfied the following criteria.

The place is important in demonstrating the course, or pattern, of cultural or natural history in New South Wales.

Wollongong Railway Station is of State historical significance as the most substantial station and also the first built railway station on the originally isolated section of the Illawarra line built from Scarborough to Bombo in 1887. Wollongong Railway Station is also of historical significance as the place where construction of the line commenced, materials for the line's construction having been shipped from Sydney to Wollongong. The station is significant in retaining the original platform building from 1887, with subsequent buildings associated with the upgrade of the line, demonstrating two important historical phases of railway development on the Illawarra line.

The place is important in demonstrating aesthetic characteristics and/or a high degree of creative or technical achievement in New South Wales.

The Wollongong Railway Station platform buildings are of aesthetic significance as fine examples of railway station buildings, including the Victorian Italianate style 1887 3rd class brick platform building, and 1890 refreshment room on Platform 2, and the Federation Queen Anne style influenced 1923 brick platform building and 1926 refreshment room on Platform 1.

The place has a strong or special association with a particular community or cultural group in New South Wales for social, cultural or spiritual reasons.

The place has the potential to contribute to the local community's sense of place and can provide a connection to the local community's past.

The place possesses uncommon, rare or endangered aspects of the cultural or natural history of New South Wales.

The refreshment rooms to both platforms at Wollongong Railway Station are rare in the metropolitan network, though examples exist in regional areas, demonstrating a former era of rail transport where refreshment services were provided to passengers on the platform in the form of railway refreshment rooms. The Platform 2 building is one of five examples of a 3rd class brick platform building on the Illawarra line. The weighbridge is considered to be a rare remnant of the previous working yard.

The place is important in demonstrating the principal characteristics of a class of cultural or natural places/environments in New South Wales.

The 1887 Platform 2 building is a fine representative example of a 3rd class brick platform building, one of five examples on the Illawarra line, the others being in metropolitan Sydney (Carlton, Rockdale, St. Peters, Sydenham), and unusual for its extension in 1890 to add a refreshment room. The Platform 1 building is a fine representative example of a brick platform building (12 examples on the Illawarra line), again unusual for its refreshment room added in 1926. Overall, Wollongong Station is a fine example of a major rural town railway station, with extant structures from 1887 to the mid 20th century.
