= East Coast Heritage Rail =

Australian railway heritage company

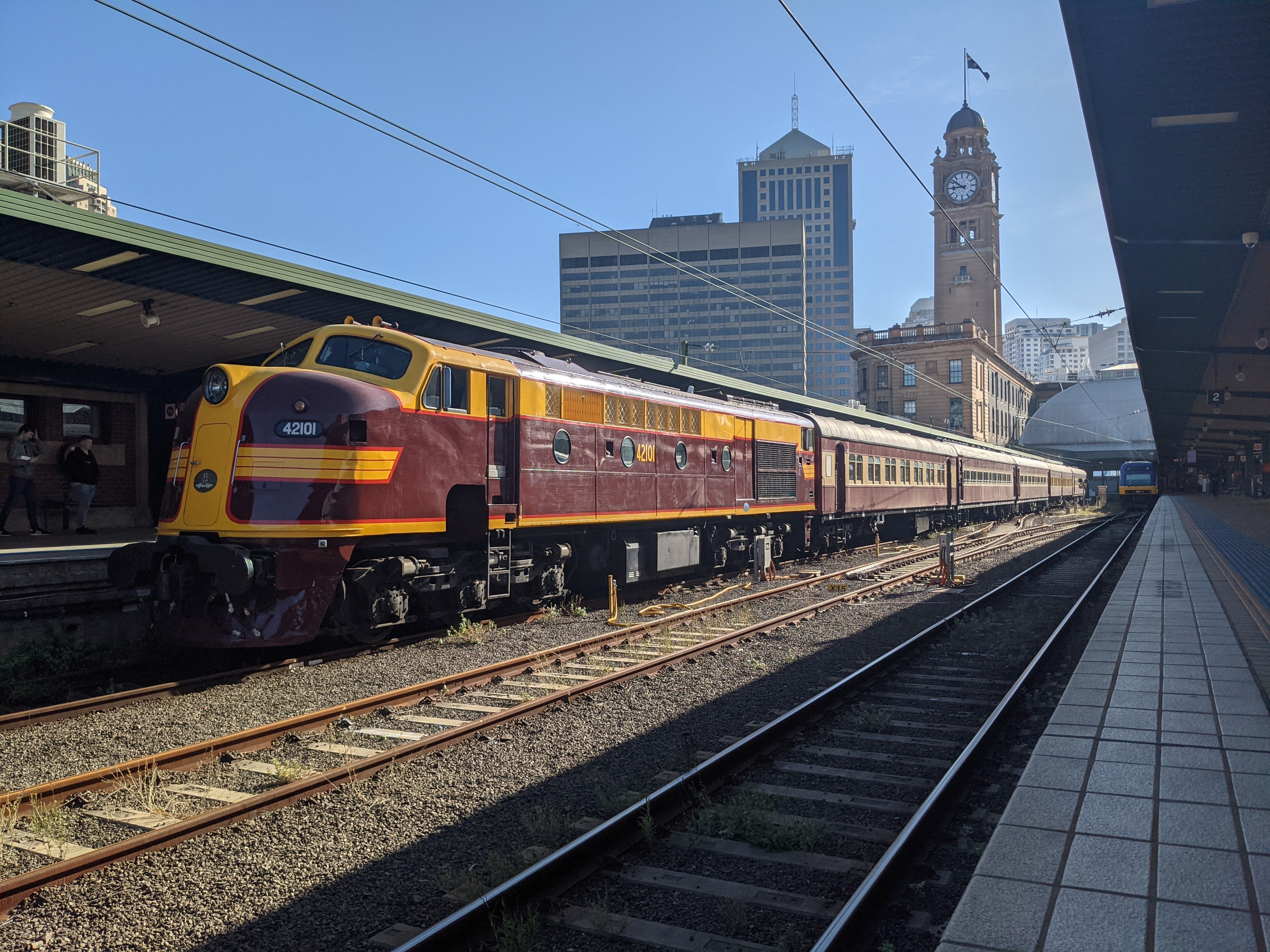
- 42101 awaits departure with Cockatoo Run at Central Station in April 2021
- Type: Non-profit
- Founded: June 1985
- Headquarters: Alexandria, Sydney
- Products: Heritage railway operator
- Website: www.eastcoastheritagerail.com.au

East Coast Heritage Rail is a not for profit company limited by guarantee formed in June 1985 as 3801 Limited to operate steam locomotive 3801 and its associated rolling stock. The company operated heritage train tours from 1986 until 2017, with operations recommencing in February 2019 under the new brand, East Coast Heritage Rail. The headquarters is in Alexandria, New South Wales, Australia.

== Establishment ==
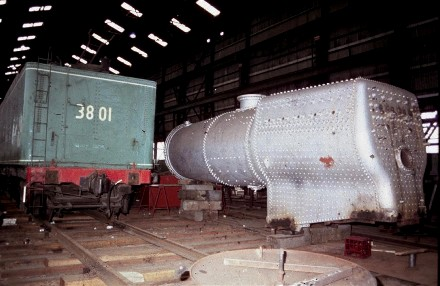
3801 under restoration at the State Dockyard

The setting up of an organisation to manage and operate locomotive 3801 was first formalised in March 1984, the State Rail Authority exchanged correspondence. At first, four parties were involved. The State Rail Authority had two roles, the first as donor of the locomotive and other equipment and the second as a trustee. In effect, 3801 would continue to be the property of the State Rail Authority and it would be leased to the trust. Three other organisations were nominated as trustees; the Powerhouse Museum, the Australian Railway Historical Society (New South Wales Division) and the New South Wales Rail Transport Museum.

At that time, the restoration of locomotive 3801 was nearing completion at the former State Dockyard site in Newcastle. Out of trade apprentices worked on this restoration for over a three-year period under the direction of the Hunter Valley Training Company. One of the first assignments undertaken by the company was to raise funds to pay for the restoration and other expenses. Its stated aim was "to exhibit with pride and enthusiasm to the people of NSW the masterful preservation of a piece of their Locomotive History ... as a living, mobile, historical work". During the restoration, the company organised regular tours of inspection at the State Dockyard.

== 3801 enters service ==
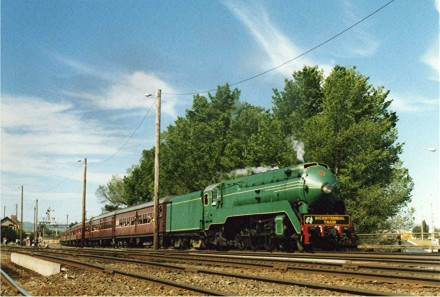
3801 hauls the Bicentennial Train through Wodonga, Victoria in October 1988

In November 1986, 3801 returned to service and operated as the flagship of 3801 Limited for the next 20 years. In 1988, 3801 and its train became the Bicentennial Train and operated tours to all the mainland capitals as part of the nation's 200-year celebrations. In the latter part of 1988 and much of 1989, Flying Scotsman joined 3801 Limited and ran many very successful tours around New South Wales and beyond. In excess of 500,000 passengers were carried by the company during this 20-year period.

== 3801 departs ==
At the conclusion of the 20-year lease covering the operation of locomotive 3801, the New South Wales Rail Transport Museum decided not to offer a renewal with 3801 departing in November 2006.

== Workshop ==
To provide an operational base for 3801 Limited, the State Rail Authority granted a licence to occupy the Large Erecting Shop at Eveleigh Railway Workshops. 3801 Limited's use of the Large Erecting Shop was terminated in early 2017 after 30 years. In late 2018 the company relocated some of its fleet to a private siding in the Hunter Valley with ready access to the main line. They are also working on other stabling sites to support their operations and to relocate the remaining non-operational vehicles from the Large Erecting Shop.

== The Cockatoo Run ==
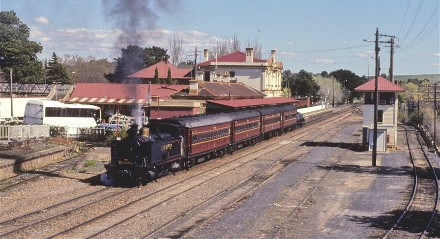
SMR18, affectionly known as "Bob", departs Moss Vale with the Cockatoo Run in September 1997.

As a result of the NSW Department of Transport seeking expressions of interest to take over the weekends only passenger service on the Unanderra to Moss Vale line as a tourist operation, 3801 Limited commenced the Cockatoo Run heritage tourist train on 19 August 1995. Initially the train operated from a base established in the Port Kembla Locomotive Depot Complex. Steam locomotive SMR18 was leased by 3801 Limited from the Hunter Valley Training Company for the service. To enable the locomotive to haul a train from Port Kembla to Moss Vale and return with one load of coal, the coal bunker was modified. Financial difficulties led to the suspension of the Cockatoo Run from November 1998 until March 1999, after which date the train ran between Port Kembla and Robertson only. Furthermore, it was diesel hauled and ran for nine months of the year.

3801 Limited vacated the Port Kembla Depot on 30 March 2001 and all rolling stock and equipment was relocated to Eveleigh. The Cockatoo Run was merged with another of the company's operations, the Long Lunch Train, from 4 March 2001 and this service operated from Sydney via Wollongong, Robertson, and Moss Vale on selected Thursdays and Sundays with heritage diesel locomotives until early 2017. It has on occasions operated with steam locomotives from the Lachlan Valley Railway and Powerhouse Museum. The service now runs on selected Sundays, with 42101 as its flagship locomotive.

== Current and former locomotive fleet ==
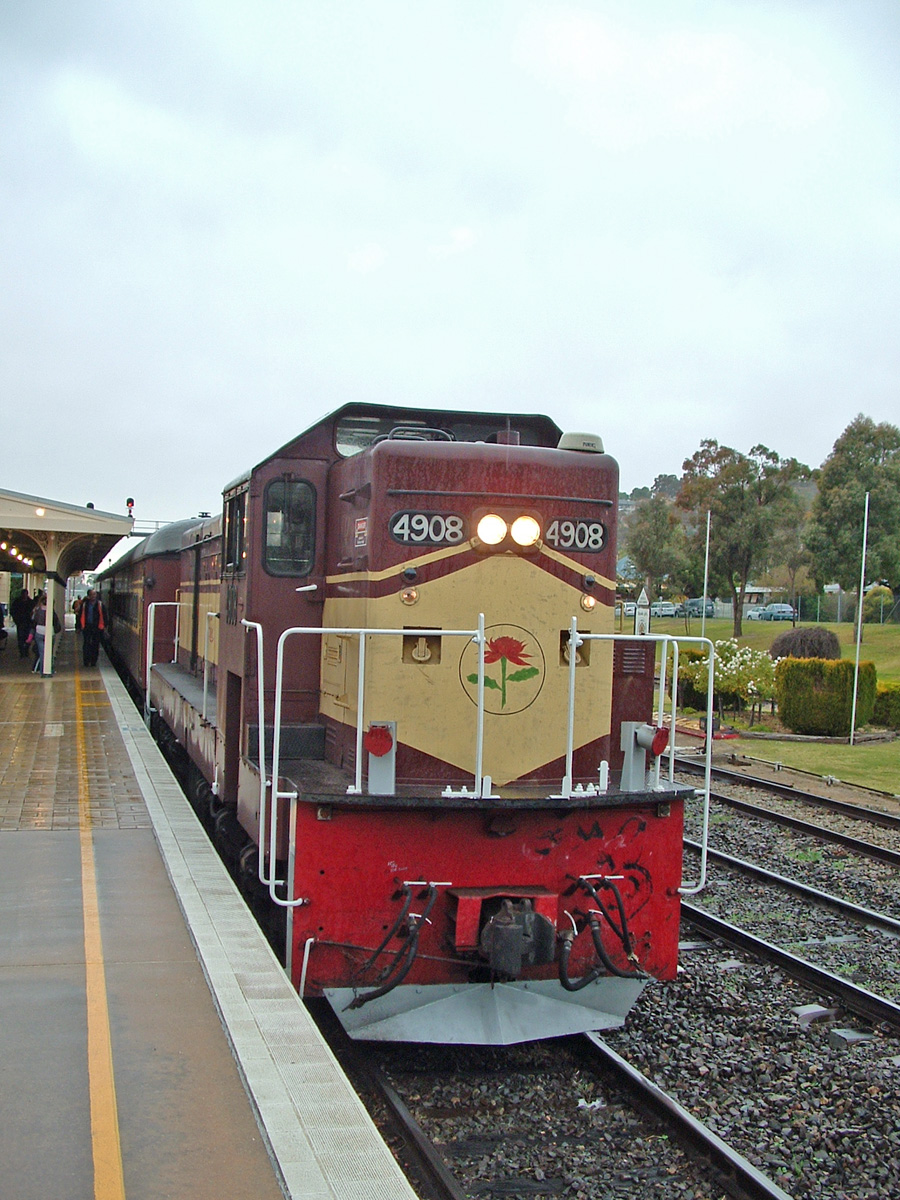
4908 at Wagga Wagga in June 2006

=== 421 class ===
The 421 class are a class of diesel locomotives built by Clyde Engineering, Granville for the Department of Railways New South Wales in 1965/66. All 10 were withdrawn from service in December 1986 and January 1987 and put in store at Junee Railway Workshop, even though some had only recently been overhauled.

In December 2009, 42101 was transferred from the Goulburn Rail Heritage Centre to Eveleigh Railway Workshops for restoration by 3801 Limited. After being fitted with refurbished traction motors at Chullora Railway Workshops in October 2011, it returned to Eveleigh to be restored back to operational condition in March 2012.42101 is presently out of service.

=== 44 class ===
The 44 class are a class of diesel locomotives built between 1957 and 1968 by AE Goodwin for express passenger and freight train haulage. 4401 is a member of Transport Heritage NSW's heritage collection and was in 3801 Limited's custody from 1995 to 2017.

=== 45 class ===
Built in 1962 by AE Goodwin for main line passenger and freight train haulage, this class of locomotive is renowned for its heavy haulage ability. 4501 was hired to 3801 Limited by Goodwin Alco Pty Ltd.

=== 48 class ===
Built in 1961 by AE Goodwin for branch line passenger and freight train haulage, this class of locomotive is capable of running on all NSW rail lines. 4833 was a regular performer on the Cockatoo Run, hired to 3801 Limited by Goodwin Alco Pty Ltd.

=== 49 class ===
Built between 1962 and 1964 by Clyde Engineering for branch line passenger and freight train haulage, this class of locomotive is capable of running on all NSW rail lines. 4918 was a regular performer on the Cockatoo Run, but was also used for mainline tours. 4918 was owned by 3801 Limited until sold to Dorrigo Steam Railway and Museum Ltd. in 2017. It also owned 4908 until sold 2007.

=== 73 class ===
The 73 class are a diesel-hydraulic shunting locomotive built by Walkers Limited, Maryborough for the New South Wales Government Railways between 1970 and 1973. 7344 is a member of the Transport Heritage NSW's heritage collection and was in 3801 Limited's custody at the Eveleigh Railway Workshops until 2017. It was a regular performer on the Cockatoo Run for many years with 7333. 7344 was retroceded to Transport Heritage NSW and in 2019 was offered for placement with other groups through expressions of interest and was subsequently placed into the hands of the Rail Motor Society at Paterson, New South Wales.

=== X class ===
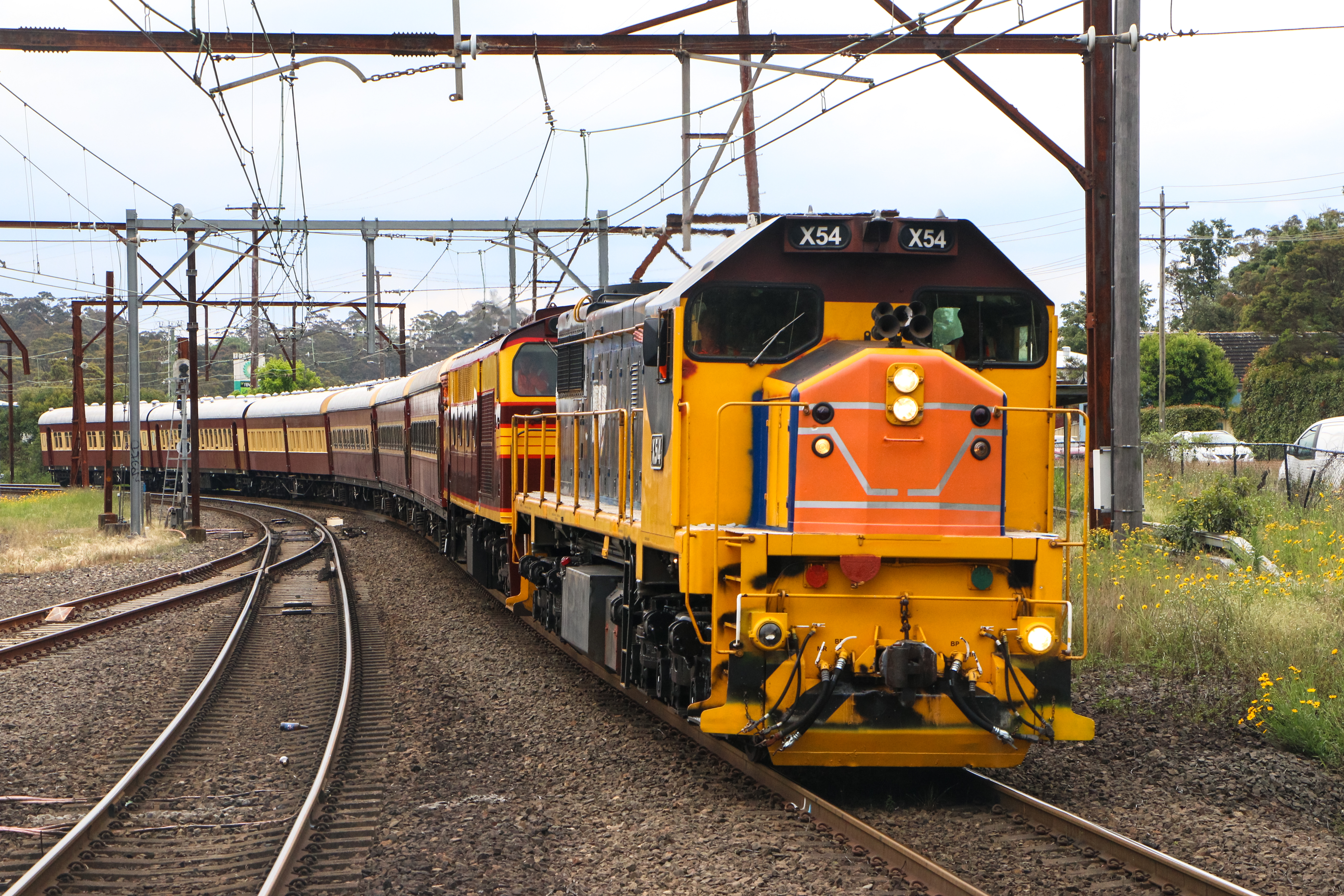
X54 and 42101 lead a charter through Valley Heights in 2022.

The last and 3rd series of the VR X class locomotives were built by Clyde Engineering at the Rosewater factory in Adelaide. X54 was the last of the Series 3 X classes and went through a number of different owners including V/Line, Freight Australia, QR National and Aurizon where it was then placed into storage in Rothbury, NSW. East Coast Heritage Rail then bought the locomotive off Aurizon and ran its first heritage tour in late 2022. It initially wore the QR National livery, with logos painted over and the No. 1 end painted in an approximation of the VicRail teacup scheme. In 2024, it was painted in full VicRail teacup.
