= Moss Vale railway station =

Railway station in New South Wales, Australia

Moss Vale
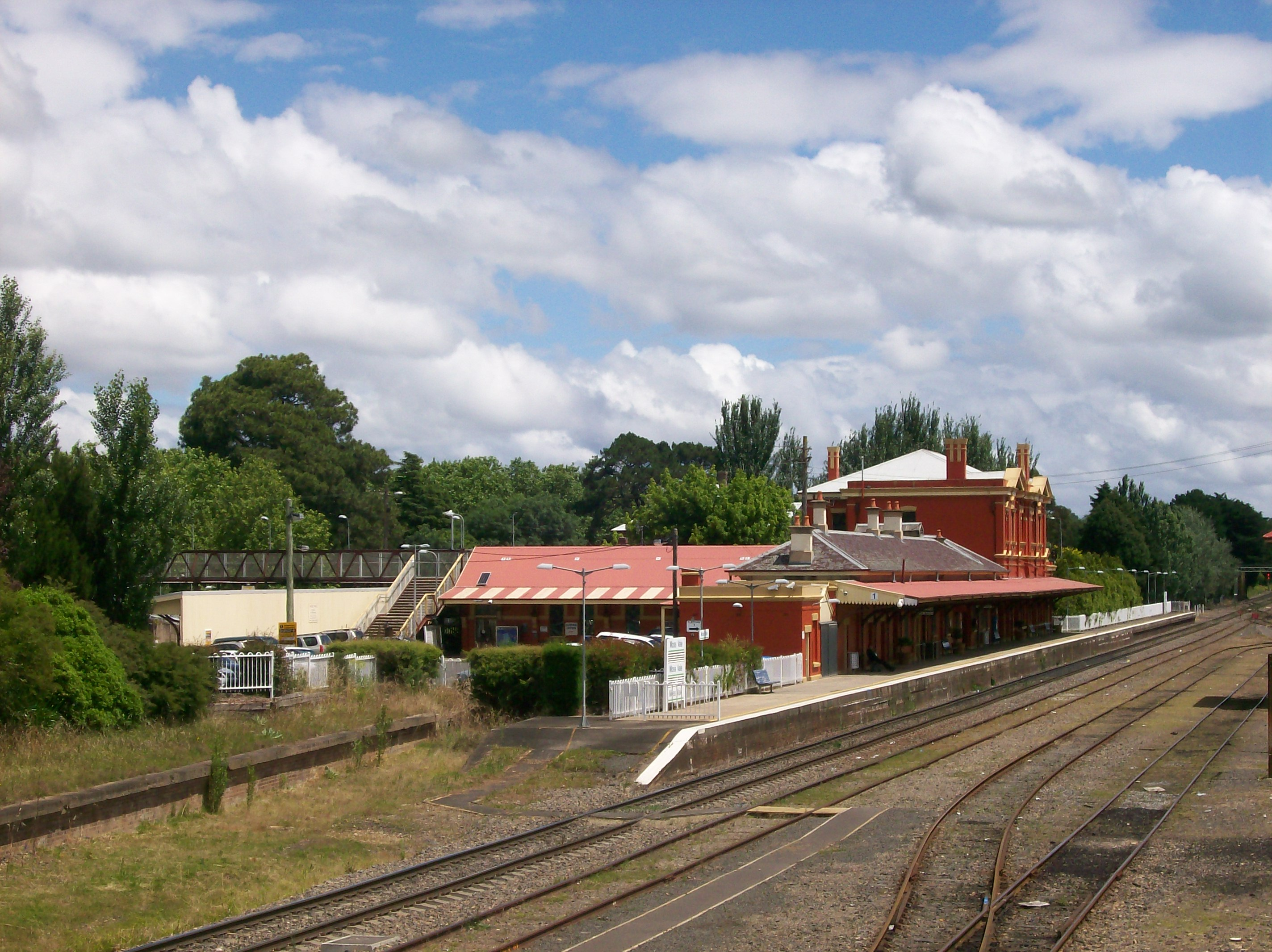
- Southbound view of Platform 1, December 2011

General information
- Location: Dalys Way, Moss Vale; Australia
- Coordinates: 34°32′53″S 150°22′17″E
- Elevation: 674 metres (2,211 ft)
- Owner: Transport Asset Manager of New South Wales
- Operator: Sydney Trains and NSW TrainLink
- Lines: Main Southern; Unanderra
- Distance: 145.71 kilometres (90.54 mi) from Central
- Platforms: 2 (1 island)
- Tracks: 9
- Connections: Bus

Construction
- Structure type: Ground
- Accessible: Yes

Other information
- Status: Staffed
- Station code: MSV
- Website: Transport for NSW

History
- Opened: 2 December 1867
- Former names: Sutton Forest (1867–1877)

Passengers
- 2025: 79,832 (year); 219 (daily) (Sydney Trains, NSW TrainLink)

Services
Preceding station	Intercity Trains	Following station
Terminus	Southern Highlands Line	Burradoo towards Campbelltown or Central
Exeter towards Goulburn	Southern Highlands Line Limited morning and evening services	Burradoo towards Campbelltown or Central
Preceding station	NSW TrainLink	Following station
Bundanoon towards Griffith or Canberra	NSW TrainLink Southern Line Griffith and Canberra Xplorers	Bowral towards Sydney
Goulburn towards Melbourne	NSW TrainLink Southern Line Melbourne XPT	Campbelltown towards Sydney
Excursion runs
Preceding station	East Coast Heritage Rail	Following station
Terminus	The Cockatoo Run	Robertson towards Central
Location

Moss Vale railway station is a heritage-listed railway station on the Main Southern line in New South Wales, Australia. It serves the town of Moss Vale, opening on 2 December 1867. It was added to the New South Wales State Heritage Register on 2 April 1999.

== History ==
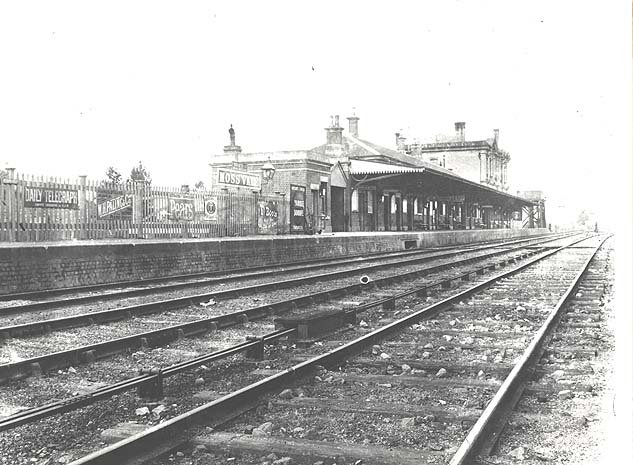
The station c.1890

Moss Vale opened as Sutton Forest on 2 December 1867. It was the terminus of the line until the extension to Marulan on 6 August 1868. The station was renamed to Moss Vale in 1877.

In March 1999, a refuelling and stabling facility for Endeavour railcars was built to the north of the station.

Moss Vale railway station was listed on the New South Wales State Heritage Register on 2 April 1999.

== Platforms and services ==
Moss Vale has an island platform with two sides. It is serviced by Sydney Trains intercity Southern Highlands Line services from Campbelltown, morning services to Sydney Central and 1 early morning & evening services to Goulburn.

It is also serviced by NSW TrainLink Xplorer and XPT long-distance services from Sydney to Canberra, Griffith and Melbourne.

Platform	Line	Stopping pattern	Notes
1	SHL	services to Campbelltown morning services to Sydney Central (1 weekday, 2 weekend)	
1	Southern Region	services to Sydney Central	
2	SHL	early morning & evening services to Goulburn	
2	Southern Region	services to Canberra, Griffith & Melbourne	

== Transport links ==
NSW TrainLink also operate road coach services to Bundanoon, Goulburn and Wollongong from the station forecourt.

== Description ==
The original station building is a second-class brick building built by W. & A. Elphinstone in 1867. Alterations were made in 1890, including improvements to the Governor's waiting room and chandeliers. A two-storey hotel and refreshment room was added in 1891. The awning to the down platform was added in 1914 and the brick booking office in 1915. Alterations were made to the refreshment room in 1919, involving the conversion of the bar to a dining room and the construction of a new bar.

The station has an unusually wide island platform, which is connected to the station entrance and the street by a pedestrian overpass. The platform included a garden and a private dining room for Governor Belmore who spent the summers in nearby Throsby Park from 1870 to 1872. The dining room had to be big enough for a cook to prepare simple dishes and for a footman to serve. The current up platform was built in brick and lengthened in 1882. The new down platform was constructed in 1914 following duplication, with road bridge access and car turning area, specifically to enable Governor Gerald Strickland's disabled daughter to access the train.

The two-storey hip-roof timber signal box in the yard and the two metal-framed pedestrian bridges both date from 1915. The station precinct also contains a dock platform, road overbridge at the up end, weighbridge and triangle to turn 57 class locomotives. The pedestrian approach from the east side, brick walls and embankment, station forecourt and signs are all included in the station's heritage listing.

There is a grassy area at the south end of the station, with picnic tables in between the platforms. A dock platform previously existed at the northern end of Platform 1 for services to Wollongong, but this track has since been lifted. Immediately north of the station, is the junction for the Unanderra line.

The former stationmaster's residence, completed in 1874, was based on a standard design from the office of Commissioner John Whitton. In 1918, the Residence was converted for use as dormitory for female staff employed within the Railway Refreshment Room. An entrance porch was added in 1926. The Residence was adapted again, in 1952, into two separate apartments for railway staff. The works included the installation of timber partitions, an access cut through the northern wall and new internal door openings. It was leased to the Wingecarribee Shire Council to house the Southern Highlands Regional Gallery in 1994, at which time it saw the erection of a new pergola and a new southern extension, the removal of the eastern Railway outbuildings, and all the internal doors removed for ease of movement through the gallery. It had returned to residential use by 2001.

== See also ==
- Argyle Street railway bridge, Moss Vale
- List of regional railway stations in New South Wales
