= New South Wales H set =

Class of electric multiple unit operating in Sydney, Australia

H set
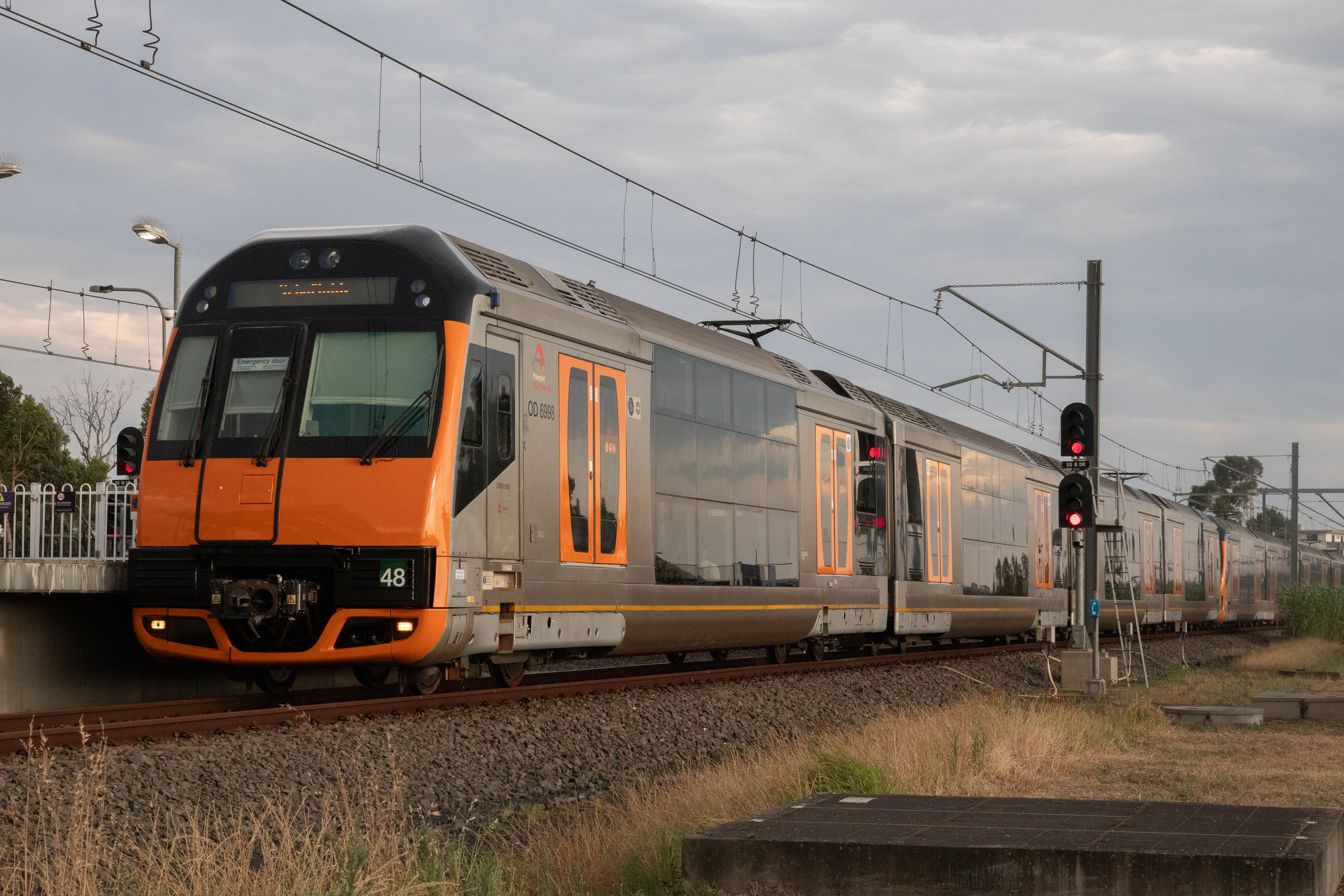
- H48 in current livery at Schofields

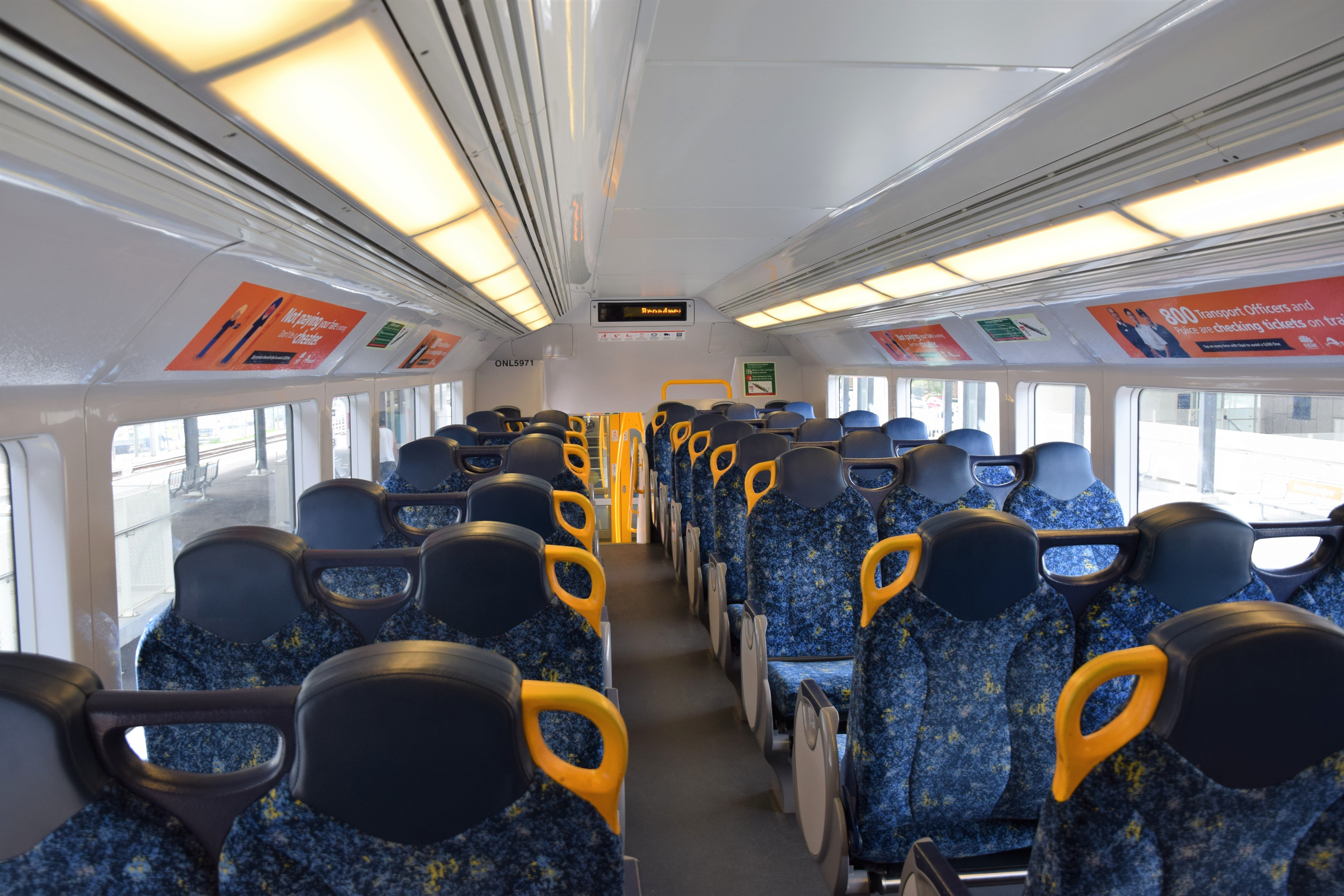
- Interior (upper deck)
- Stock type: Electric multiple unit
- In service: 2006–present
- Manufacturer: UGL Rail
- Built at: Broadmeadow
- Replaced: G sets, V sets (2nd batch, DCM & DCT cars), K sets (suburban services)
- Constructed: 2006–2012
- Entered service: 15 December 2006
- Refurbished: 2025–present
- Number built: 221
- Number in service: 220
- Successor: D sets (for Intercity services only)
- Formation: 55 4-car sets
- Fleet numbers: OD 6901–6999, 6843–6854 (driving trailers); ON 5901–5949, 5821–5826 (motor cars); ONL 5951–5999, 5871–5876 (motor cars with lavatory); H1–H55 (full 4-car sets)
- Capacity: 432
- Operators: Sydney Trains (2024–present); NSW TrainLink (2013–2024); CityRail (2006–2013)
- Depots: Hornsby; Mortdale
- Lines served: South Coast; Central Coast & Newcastle; North Shore & Western; Illawarra; Northern

Specifications
- Car body construction: Stainless steel with fibreglass end bonnets
- Train length: 81.55 m (267 ft 6 5/8 in)
- Car length: 20.34 m (66 ft 8 3/4 in) (OD); 20,435 mm (67 ft 1/2 in) (ON/ONL)
- Width: 3,034 mm (9 ft 11 1/2 in)
- Height: 4,403 mm (14 ft 5 3/8 in)
- Doors: Plug-style, 2 per side
- Maximum speed: 143 km/h (89 mph) (design); 130 km/h (81 mph) (service)
- Weight: 201 t (198 long tons; 222 short tons)
- Axle load: 19 tonnes
- Traction system: Mitsubishi 2-level IGBT–VVVF inverter
- Traction motors: 8 × Mitsubishi 200 kW (270 hp) 3-phase AC induction motor
- Power output: 1,600 kW (2,146 hp)
- Acceleration: 1.03 m/s^{2} (3.4 ft/s^{2})
- Deceleration: 1.01 m/s^{2} (3.3 ft/s^{2}) (service); 1.10 m/s^{2} (3.6 ft/s^{2}) (emergency)
- Electric systems: 1,500 V DC (nominal) from overhead catenary
- Current collection: Austbreck Pantograph
- UIC classification: 2′2′+Bo′Bo′+Bo′Bo′+2′2′
- Braking systems: Automatic air, electropneumatic and regenerative (Faiveley Transport)
- Coupling system: Dellner
- Track gauge: 1,435 mm (4 ft 8 1/2 in) standard gauge

The H sets, commonly referred to as the OSCAR (Outer Suburban Car) trains, are a class of double-decker electric multiple units (EMU) currently operated by Sydney Trains on its Sydney suburban routes and some intercity routes in New South Wales, Australia.

Built by UGL Rail in Broadmeadow, the H sets first entered service under the CityRail brand in December 2006, with the last in December 2012. Their introduction allowed for the retirement of some second-class V set carriages (second class DCM and DCT carriages). As long-distance trains, the H sets share a similar overall layout and design to the previous Intercity Tangara G sets. Currently operating as 55 four-carriage sets, the H sets now operate on numerous suburban lines, as well as the South Coast line.

== Design ==
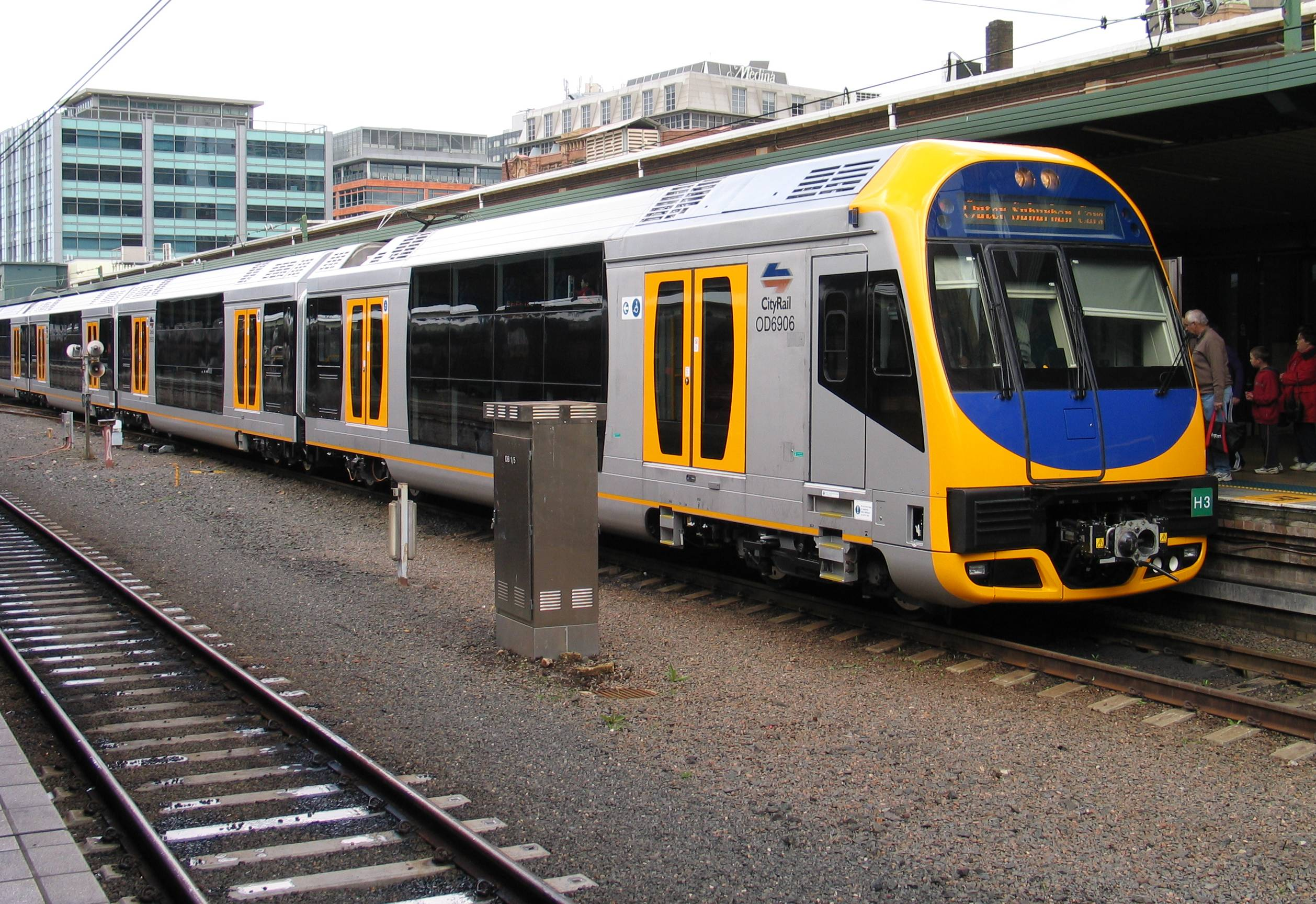
Set H3 with original livery in 2006

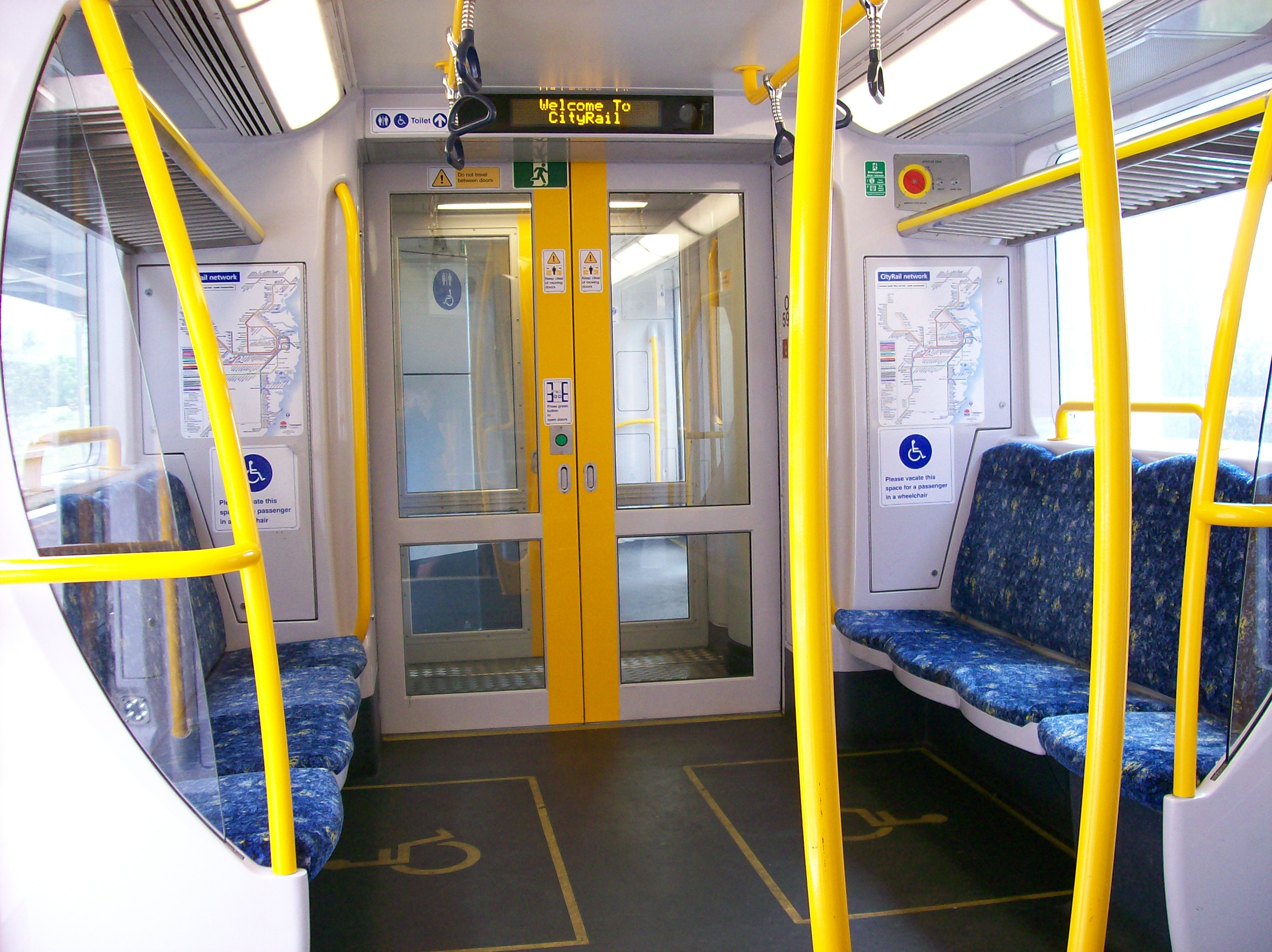
Vestibule interior. Note the foldable seats to accommodate passengers in wheelchairs.

There are many similarities between the H sets and the M sets, including improved external destination boards, internal destination boards displaying stopping patterns, Digital Voice Announcements, security cameras, and green target plates. The OSCARs also have additional features to increase comfort on the longer journeys they operate. These include high back seating covered with durable, vandal-proof woollen moquette fabric with padded head-rests, retractable footrests, luggage racks, aisle seat armrests and a wheelchair-accessible toilet. Wheelchair seating is available in the vestibules, while 3x2 seating is provided in the upper and lower deck sections. Carriage interiors were designed by Transport Design International.

The OSCAR shares a common bogie design with the Hunter railcars, however the OSCAR does not have yaw dampers installed, resulting in a maximum service speed of 130 km/h (as opposed to 145 km/h on the Hunter railcars).

The OSCARs also include several new safety features. The doors on older rolling stock such as V sets are all unlocked at every station (even short platforms). V Sets have doors that must be slid open for alighting or boarding and G Sets have push buttons. However, on the H set, the guard is able to select the number of doors to be opened at a station. This feature is aimed at preventing incidents where passengers may fall from the carriage when stopped at a short platform.

The H sets have been fitted with Dellner automatic couplers, compatible with the M sets and the Hunter railcars. They are able to absorb the impact of a collision, and the anti-climbers on the H sets will also reduce the force of impact. The trains also have a different body design to prior rolling stock. Instead of the entire body being of the same design, the driver's cab is built like a protective cage, made of fibreglass and supported by a box section steel frame, which stretches to the end of the guard's door. The rest of the train is made from conventional stainless steel.

The train's journey is announced automatically through onboard male/female digital voiceovers

== Delivery ==
The initial order was for 41 cars and the contract was awarded in February 2003. The second order for 81 cars was awarded in April 2005 and the third in March 2009 for 72 cars, increased to 74 in March 2010 and 99 in January 2011. The OSCARs were late in starting service as CityRail wanted to test the trains thoroughly after the M sets had a troubled introduction. On 5 August 2006, set H3 was opened for inspection to the public, as part of Central station's centenary celebrations.

On 15 December 2006, the OSCARs entered revenue service between Sydney and Wollongong on Thursdays and Fridays. A few months later, OSCARs operated the services on all weekdays. Their progressive entry into service allowed the former G sets to be redeployed on services to Wyong and Springwood. From 30 April 2007, the H sets were introduced on other services, but the original OSCAR service reverted to G Set operation. Eight car operation started on 26 November 2007.

On 8 April 2008, H sets were the first rolling stock to be used on the Epping to Chatswood railway line, operating a shuttle service from 23 February 2009 to 10 October 2009. Four car sets operated on the line exclusively during the shuttle phase until it was integrated into the Northern line service.

An additional order for 72 cars was confirmed on 27 March 2009, forming 18 additional four-car sets. The 2010 State budget increased this order to 74 cars. The two additional cars will become spares. The first train from this order entered service on 18 October 2010. In response to passenger feedback, these carriages feature an additional 20 millimetres of padding on the seat backing and lengthened seat bases to increase comfort.

The final H set was delivered to CityRail in December 2012 along with spare driver trailer OD 6850.

== In service ==
Formation

Each four car set is made up of three different types of carriages:

- OD = Outer suburban Driving car: 102 seats
- ON = Outer suburban Non-Control motor: 118 seats
- ONL = Outer suburban Non-Control motor with Lavatory: 110 seats

in this configuration: OD–ONL–ON–OD.

Sets are numbered as follows (where n is the set number):

- Sets H1–10: OD69 (n*2–1), ONL59 (n+50), ON59 (n), OD69 (n*2)
- Sets H11–48: OD69 (n*2+1), ONL59 (n+50), ON59 (n), OD69 (n*2+2)
- Set H49: OD6921, ONL5999, ON5949, OD6922
- Sets H50–55: OD69 (n*2–57), ONL58 (n+21), ON58 (n–29), OD69 (n*2–56)

H sets are operated by Sydney Trains on the following intercity lines:

- South Coast Line: Sydney Central, Bondi Junction or Martin Place to Port Kembla & Kiama
- Central Coast & Newcastle Line: Sydney Central, Gosford or Wyong to Newcastle Interchange & Gordon

H sets are used on a limited number of suburban services on the following lines:

- T1 North Shore & Western Line from Central to Blacktown (weekday peak hour services only)
- T4 Eastern Suburbs & Illawarra Line from Bondi Junction to Hurstville or Waterfall (weekday peak hour services only)

The converted suburban H sets currently operate on the following line:

- T1 North Shore & Western Line services from Schofields to Hornsby via Gordon (weekday peak hours services only)
- T9 Northern Line (weekdays only)

== Refurbishment ==
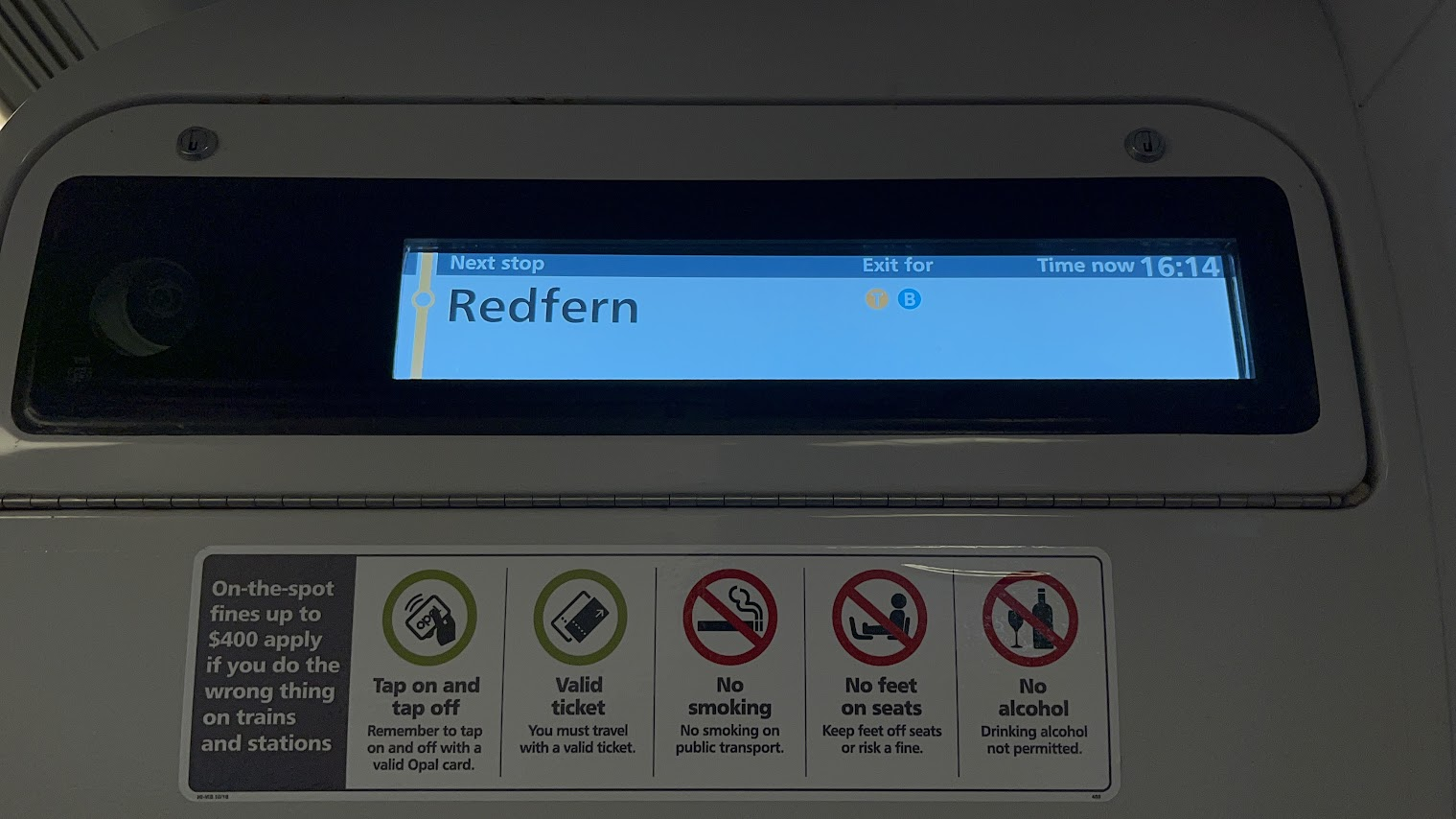
New LCD displays, August 2024

With the introduction of D sets on the intercity network in December 2024, the H sets are in the process of being transferred to operate on suburban services.

In preparation for their eventual transfer to suburban services, H sets have been undergoing a refurbishment programme at the Hornsby Maintenance Centre since 2023.

Internal upgrades implemented across the fleet include the addition of ATP, removal of toilets, newly upgraded LCD interior passenger information displays and updated digital voice announcements.

In addition, a new external livery featuring repainted cab designs and orange doors is also being rolled out to visually bring the fleet in line with the rest of Sydney's suburban rolling stock.

The refurbished H sets began service on the T1 North Shore & Western Line and T9 Northern Line in October 2025. As of February 2026, 17 sets have been repainted into the new suburban livery.
