= Sydney Trains =

Operator of passenger rail services in and around Sydney

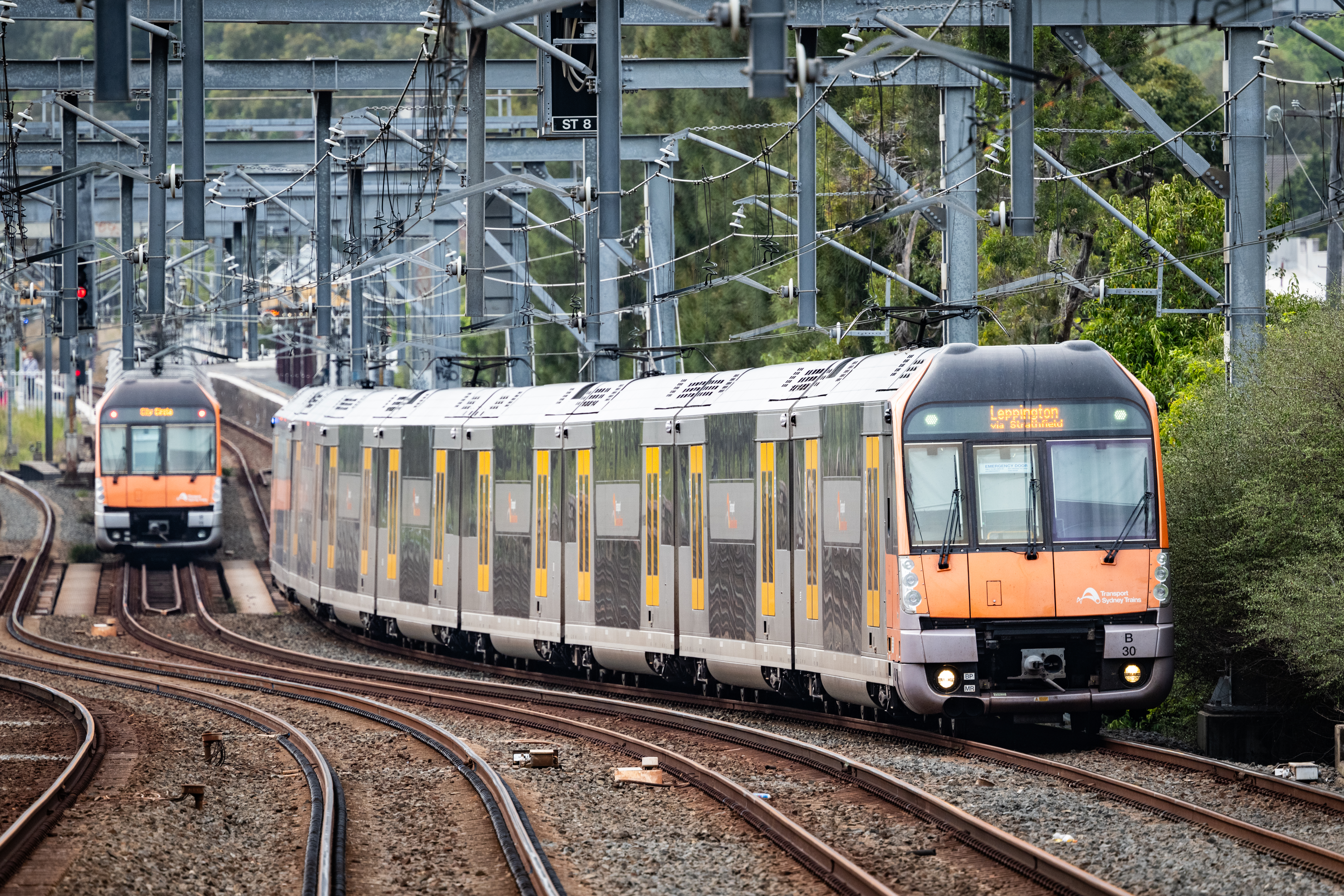
- B set trains near Summer Hill station

- Roundel

Overview
- Owner: Transport for NSW
- Locale: Greater Sydney; Central Coast; Hunter; Illawarra; South Coast; Southern Highlands; Central West
- Transit type: Suburban rail Regional rail
- Number of lines: 9
- Line number: Suburban: T1, T2, T3, T4, T5, T6, T7, T8, T9; Intercity: Blue Mountains, Central Coast and Newcastle, South Coast, Hunter, Southern Highlands
- Number of stations: 169
- Annual ridership: Suburban: 271 million; Intercity: 26 million (FY 2024–2025)
- Chief executive: Matthew Longland
- Website: Transport for NSW: Sydney Trains

Operation
- Began operation: 1 July 2013
- Number of vehicles: 240 8-carriage trains

Technical
- System length: 355.5 km (220.9 mi)
- Track gauge: 1,435 mm (4 ft 8 1/2 in) standard gauge
- Electrification: 1,500 V DC from overhead catenary
Suburban lines

Sydney Trains is the brand name and operator of suburban and intercity train services in and around Greater Sydney in New South Wales, Australia.

The inner part of the network is a suburban rail system with a central underground core. It covers 369 km (229 mi) of route length over 919 km (571 mi) of track, with 169 stations on nine lines.

Sydney Trains also operates the NSW intercity train network, with electric and diesel services reaching further away and long distance destinations, including Newcastle, Bathurst, Goulburn, Bomaderry, Scone, and Dungog.

The suburban network has frequencies of 5–10 minutes at peak-time at most inner-city and major stations, and 15 minutes off-peak at most minor stations. During the weekday peak, train services are more frequent. Frequencies on the intercity network vary by line, but they generally run at least four trains per direction in the peak hour, and at least one train per hour in off-peak times.

Nearly all rolling stock consists of double-deck electric multiple unit trains, but some single-deck diesel multiple units are run on the intercity network.

Sydney Trains are labelled with a "T" symbol on station signs and timetables. Additionally, each suburban service is given a number ranging from 1 to 9 (T1, T2, etc.). Intercity services are sometimes shown with three-letter abbreviations (for instance, the Blue Mountains line is labelled BMT).

The network is managed by Transport for NSW and is integrated with its Opal ticketing system. In 2024–25, 270 million passenger journeys were made on the suburban network, making it the most-used rail network in Australia.

== History ==
=== Background ===
The first passenger railway in New South Wales was constructed in 1855, forming the basis of the New South Wales Government Railways. NSWGR continued building railways, including the 1890 opening of the North Shore Line, exclusively for suburban traffic. The 1920s and '30s saw the electrification of a large portion of the suburban network, as well as the construction of the City Circle and Harbor Bridge.

In 1932, governance of the railway network was moved to the Department of Railways New South Wales. In 1952 the City Circle concluded construction, with the opening of Circular Quay station. What would become the Intercity network would first receive electrification starting in 1957, with the opening of electric service to Lithgow. In 1972 governance was moved to the Public Transport Commission, which oversaw the opening of the Eastern Suburbs Line in 1979. In 1980, governance changed again, this time to the State Rail Authority. In 1989, passenger services run by the SRA were given the brand name of CityRail. In 2000, the Airport Line opened. Finally, in 2003, governance was moved to RailCorp, though the CityRail brand continued to be used.

=== Establishment ===
In May 2012, the Minister for Transport announced a restructure of RailCorp, the organisation that owned and managed the suburban rail network and operated passenger services throughout New South Wales. Two new organisations were created to take over the operation of the services from July 2013. Sydney Trains acquired all suburban services in the Sydney metropolitan area bounded by Berowra, Emu Plains, Macarthur and Waterfall from RailCorp's CityRail division. Intercity and regional train services previously operated by CityRail were taken over by NSW Trains, branded as NSW TrainLink.

RailCorp remained the owner of the network infrastructure. When first created as subsidiaries of RailCorp, Sydney Trains and NSW Trains were not controlled entities of RailCorp, but were instead controlled by Transport for NSW. They later ceased to be subsidiaries of RailCorp, becoming independent standalone agencies in July 2017.

=== Network changes ===
Sydney Trains began operation with 11 lines, just on the suburban network. This was nominally reduced to 7 lines following a reorganization in the October 2013 timetable.

In 2015, the first expansion of the Sydney suburban network after the restructuring of CityRail into Sydney Trains occurred when the South West Rail Link opened between Glenfield and Leppington.

In November 2017, an eighth line was created by splitting the T2 line into two separate lines — T2 and T8 — reversing their merger in 2013. Additionally, T5 services no longer travelled to Campbelltown, instead starting and terminating at Leppington.

In September 2018, the Epping to Chatswood Rail Link between Chatswood and Epping was closed for conversion to form part of the Sydney Metro Northwest project, which opened as the Metro North West Line in May 2019.

In April 2019, the section of the T1 line between Gordon and Hornsby via Strathfield was renumbered as T9 — restoring a similar pre-2009 route. The portion between Berowra and Richmond or Emu Plains via Chatswood and Parramatta remained as T1.

In January 2020, the Carlingford Line between Clyde and Carlingford closed, becoming part of the Parramatta Light Rail network in December 2024. The adjacent section of track between Clyde and Camellia, including Rosehill railway station, became disused.

In August 2023, it was announced that the majority of NSW TrainLink's intercity operations would be transferred to Sydney Trains, including rolling stock, maintenance, operations, stations, and staff. This would include the modifications, testing, and introduction of the New Intercity Fleet (NIF). This process was completed by July 2024

In October 2024, a large portion of the Bankstown Line was closed for conversion into a Sydney Metro Line. The T6 Line was reduced to a Bankstown to Lidcombe shuttle (Lidcombe & Bankstown Line), with commuters interchanging at Regents Park or Lidcombe for connecting services to Liverpool or City Circle. The section of the Bankstown Line between Sydenham and Bankstown will form part of Sydney Metro City & Southwest project, which is due to open as the Metro North West & Bankstown Line in 2026.

== Operations ==
=== Suburban network ===
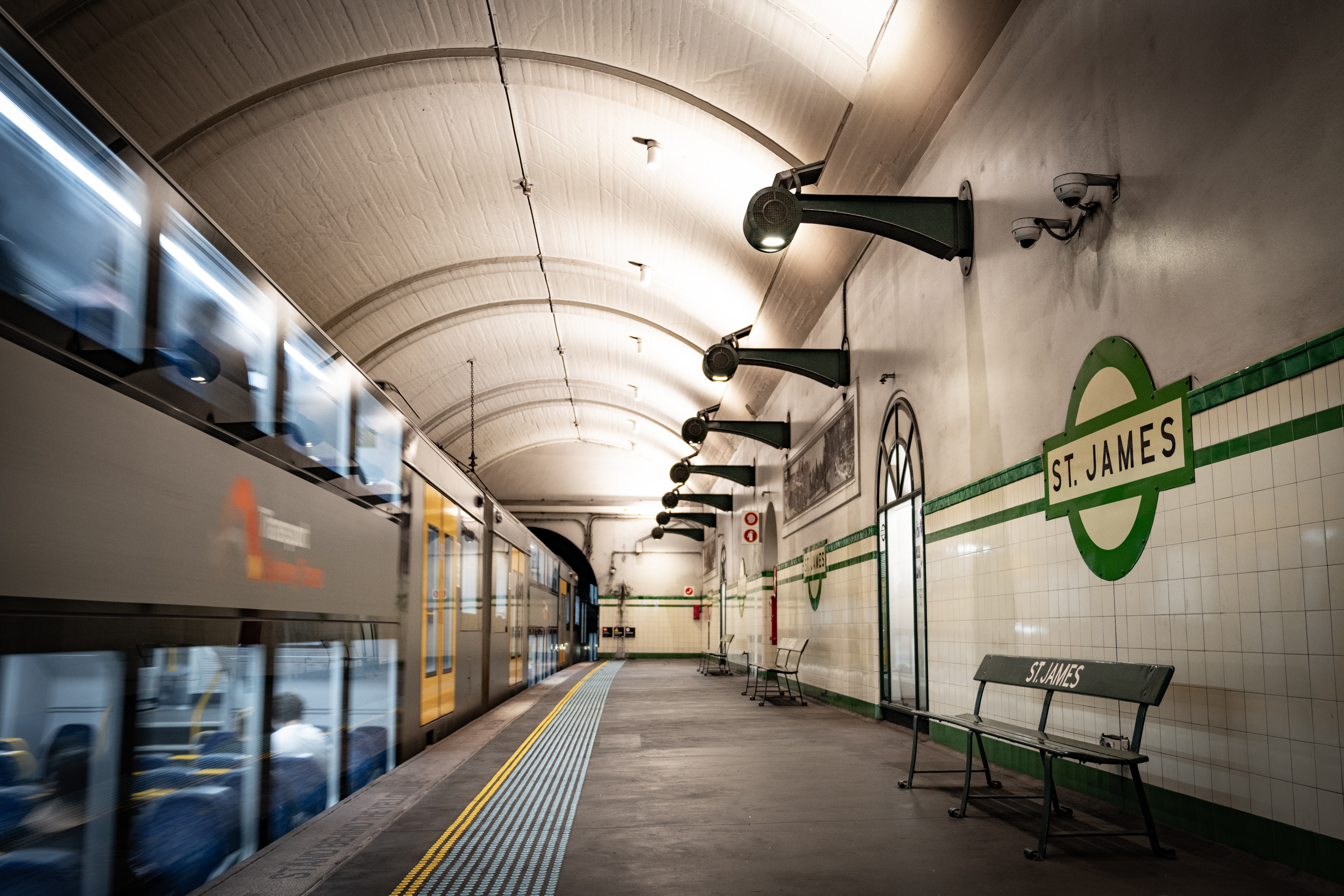
St James station on the City Circle section of the network

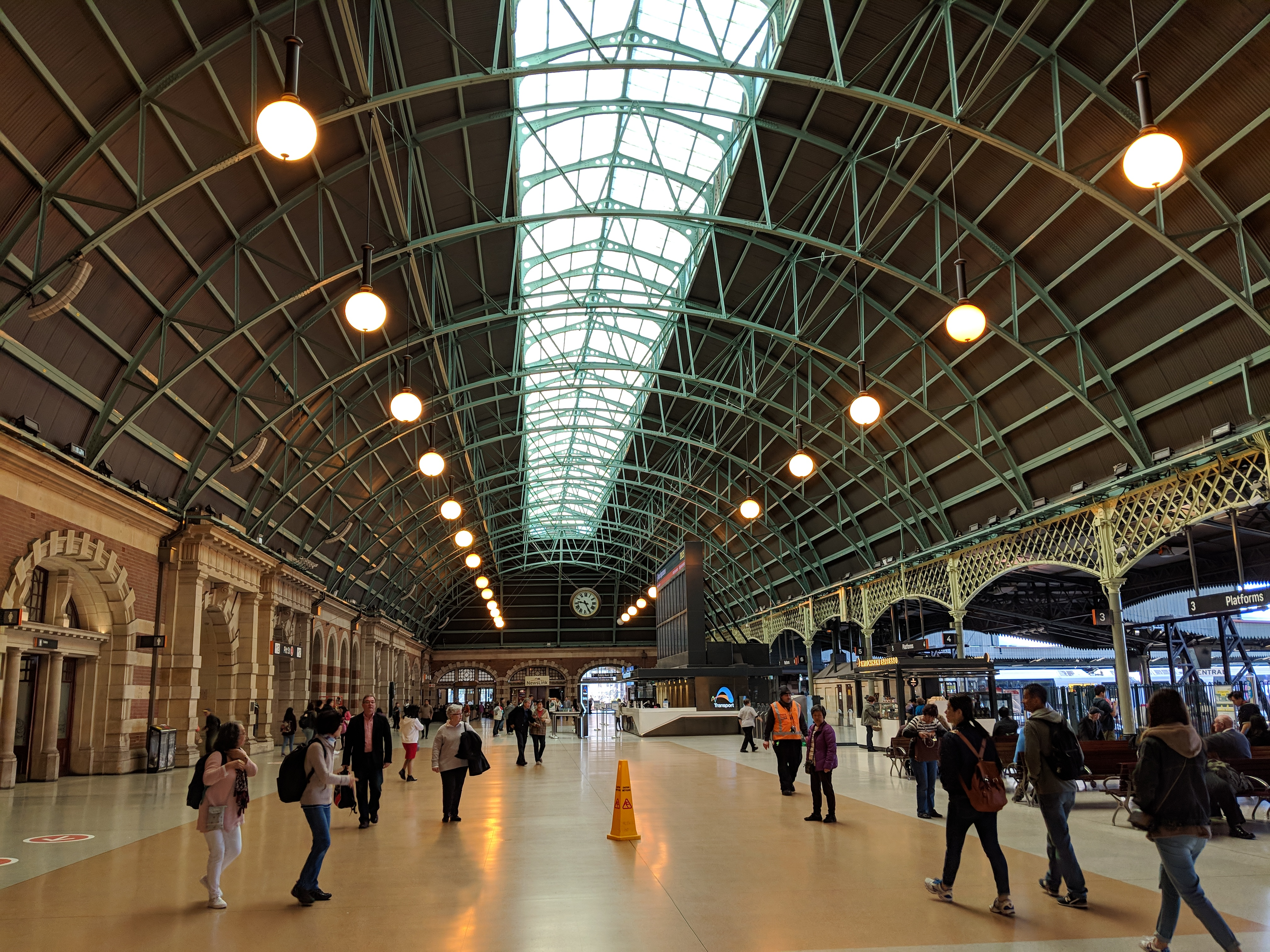
The Grand Concourse of Central station

Sydney Trains operates nine electric suburban lines across Sydney. All lines are electrified at 1,500 volt DC overhead.

The main hub of the Sydney Trains system is Central station, which most lines pass through. Central is also the terminus of most intercity, long distance and interstate lines including NSW TrainLink. After leaving Central, trains coming from the T2 Leppington & Inner West Line, T3 Liverpool and Inner West Line and T8 Airport & South Line then travel through the City Circle – a ring line beneath the Sydney central business district.

After completing the City Circle, these trains pass through Central for a second time and return to the suburbs. The T1 North Shore & Western, T4 Eastern Suburbs & Illawarra and T9 Northern lines pass through the central business district and continue to other areas of Sydney.

The T5 Cumberland Line serves Western Sydney and provides access to the major centre of Parramatta from the southwest of the city without requiring a change of trains at Granville. The T6 Lidcombe & Bankstown Line, and the T7 Olympic Park Line are suburban shuttle services.

==== Lines ====
Line colour, number and name		Between
T1 North Shore & Western Line	North Shore & Western Line	Berowra and Emu Plains or Richmond.
T2 Leppington & Inner West Line	Leppington & Inner West Line	City Circle and Parramatta or Leppington via Granville.
T3 Liverpool & Inner West Line	Liverpool & Inner West Line	City Circle and Liverpool via Lidcombe and Regents Park.
T4 Eastern Suburbs & Illawarra Line	Eastern Suburbs & Illawarra Line	Bondi Junction and Waterfall or Cronulla via Central.
T5 Cumberland Line	Cumberland Line	Schofields and Leppington. Limited services continue from Schofields to Richmond.
T6 Lidcombe & Bankstown Line	Lidcombe & Bankstown Line	Bankstown and Lidcombe.
Olympic Park railway line	Olympic Park Line	Lidcombe and Olympic Park. Some services operate between Central and Olympic Park, particularly during special events, such as the Sydney Royal Easter Show.
T8 Airport & South Line	Airport & South Line	City Circle and Macarthur via Revesby and either Sydenham (peak) or Airport.
T9 Northern Line	Northern Line	Hornsby and Gordon via Strathfield and City.

=== Intercity network ===
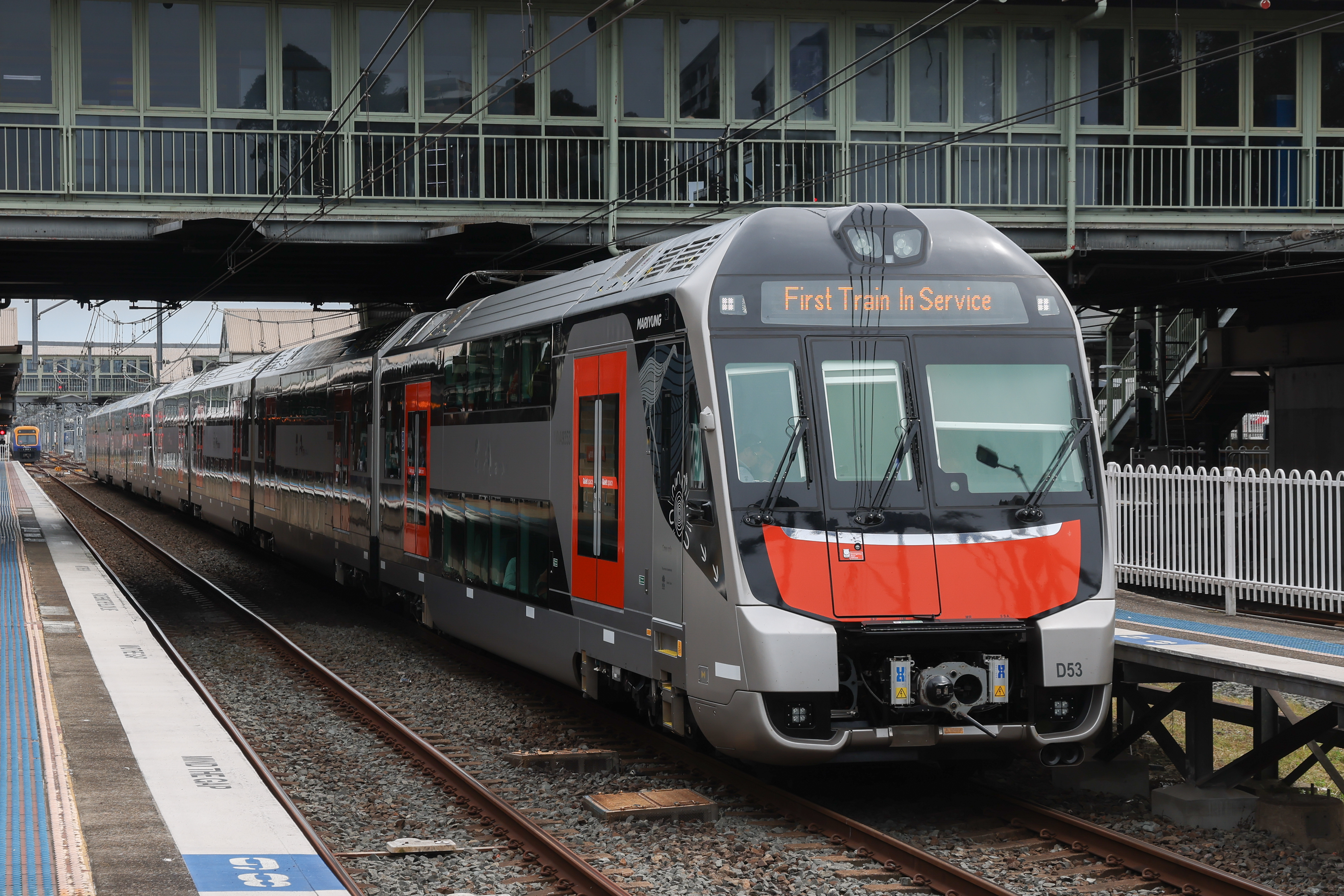
An intercity service between Sydney and Newcastle

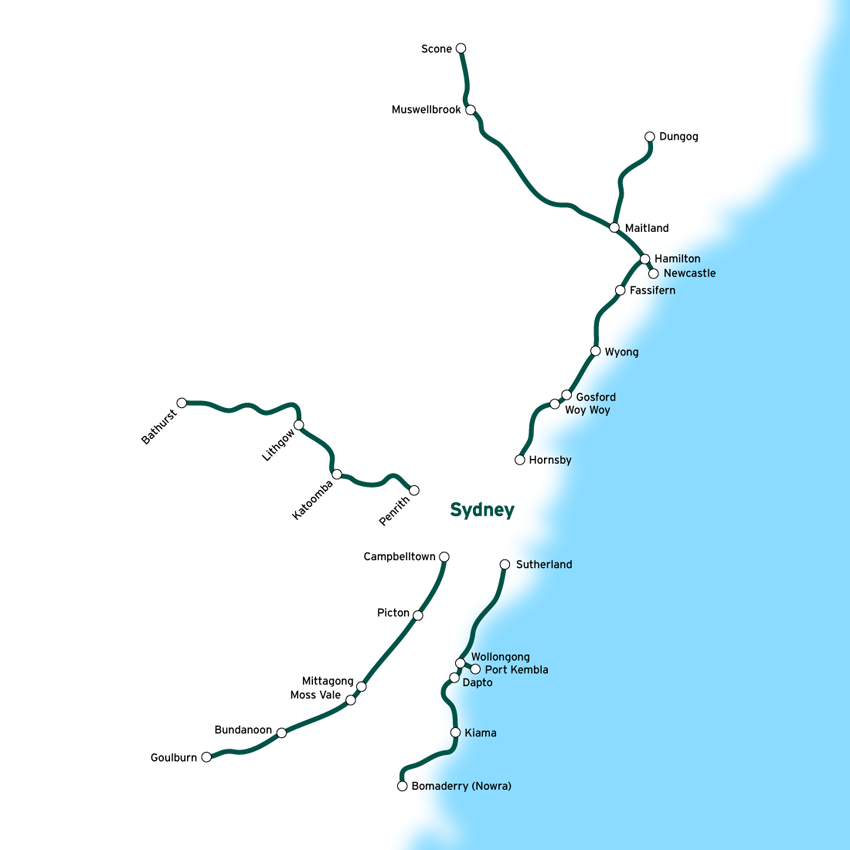
A map of intercity network, excluding the Sydney suburban portions of lines

Sydney Trains also operate intercity services to a distance approximately 200 kilometres (124 mi) from Sydney, bounded by Dungog in the north, Scone in the north-west, Bathurst to the west, Goulburn in the south-west and Bomaderry to the south.

Electric services extend from Sydney north to Newcastle, west to Lithgow and south to Port Kembla and Kiama.

Diesel trains serve the more distant or less populated parts of the Intercity network. Hunter Line services operate from Newcastle to Telarah with some extending to Dungog and Scone. Southern Highlands Line services operate between Campbelltown and Moss Vale with a limited number extending to Sydney and Goulburn. Diesel services operate on the South Coast Line between Kiama and Bomaderry. The Bathurst Bullet provides a twice daily, limited stop service between Sydney and Bathurst.

==== Lines ====
Line colour and name	Between	Electric services	Map
Blue Mountains Line	Central and Lithgow with limited services to Bathurst	to Lithgow	
Central Coast & Newcastle Line	Central and Newcastle	Yes	
Hunter Line	Newcastle and Telarah with limited services to Dungog or Scone	No	
South Coast Line	Central^{a} and Bomaderry or Port Kembla	to Kiama and Port Kembla	
Southern Highlands Line	Campbelltown^{b} and Moss Vale with limited services to Goulburn	No	

^a Some peak services and most weekend services on the South Coast Line run to/from Bondi Junction
^b Some peak services on the Southern Highlands Line run to/from Central. At other times, a change of train is required at Campbelltown

=== Rolling Stock ===
==== Current ====
Sydney Trains fleet
Class	Name	Image	Type	Top speed		Carriages	Entered service	Formation	Routes
Class	Name	Image	Type	km/h	mph	Carriages	Entered service	Formation	Routes
T sets	Tangara		Electric multiple unit	115	71	447	1988–1995	4 cars, 8 cars	Special and rare events only:
M sets	Millennium		Electric multiple unit	130	81	140	2002–2005	4 cars, 8 cars	T2 Leppington & Inner West Line T3 Liverpool & Inner West Line T5 Cumberland Line T6 Lidcombe & Bankstown Line Olympic Park railway line T8 Airport & South Line
H sets	OSCAR		Electric multiple unit	130	81	220	2006–2012	4 cars, 8 cars	T1 North Shore & Western Line T9 Northern Line Central Coast & Newcastle Line South Coast Line
A sets	Waratah		Electric multiple unit	130	81	626	2011–2014	8 cars	T1 North Shore & Western Line T2 Leppington & Inner West Line T3 Liverpool & Inner West Line T5 Cumberland Line Olympic Park railway line T8 Airport & South Line T9 Northern Line
B sets	Waratah		Electric multiple unit	130	81	328	2018–2021	8 cars	T1 North Shore & Western Line T2 Leppington & Inner West Line T3 Liverpool & Inner West Line Olympic Park railway line T8 Airport & South Line T9 Northern Line
D sets	Mariyung		Electric multiple unit	160	99	610	2024–present	4 cars, 6 cars	Blue Mountains Line Central Coast & Newcastle Line South Coast Line
N sets	Endeavour		Diesel multiple unit	145	90	30	1994–1996	2 cars	(to Bathurst) (Kiama–Bomaderry)
J sets	Hunter		Diesel multiple unit	145	90	14	2007–2008	2 cars	Hunter Line

==== Future ====
Class	Image	Type	Service Speed		Carriages	Lines	Built
Class	Image	Type	km/h	mph	Carriages	Lines	Built
R set		Bi-mode multiple unit	160	99	117 (to be built)	(Bathurst Bullet) (Kiama–Bomaderry)	2020–present

A fleet of 610 D set carriages are being introduced to the intercity network. They will allow the H sets to be transferred to suburban services. The first was delivered in December 2019. The D sets will be maintained at a new facility at Kangy Angy.

A fleet of 117 R set carriages are being built to replace the Endeavour railcar used on the non-electrified sections of the network. They are expected to enter service in 2026–2027. The R sets will be maintained at a new facility in Dubbo.

=== NightRide ===
NightRide bus services replace suburban trains between midnight and 4:30 am, leaving the tracks clear of trains for maintenance work. Such bus services mainly stop near stations, operating typically at hourly intervals. Some routes depart more frequently on weekends. Many services depart the city from bus stops near Town Hall station. NightRide services are identified with an 'N' before the route number.

=== Maintenance ===
In addition to operating suburban train services, Sydney Trains maintains the New South Wales Metropolitan Rail Area.

The Sydney Trains network is divided into three sectors, based around three maintenance depots. Trainsets are identified by target plates, which are exhibited on the front lower nearside of driving carriages. Each target plate includes the letter of the class the set belongs to and the number of the individual set. Waratahs do not have a target plate, having the information written directly on the front of the train. The composition and formations of train sets and the target designations are subject to alteration.

All A, B and M sets are maintained by Downer Rail. From June 2017, their contract for the M sets was extended by 10 years. All other types of trains including the V and H sets are maintained by UGL Unipart. The contract with UGL Unipart was extended for two years from July 2019.

Sydney Trains maintenance sectors
Sector #	Depot	Serviced lines	Target plate	Sets being maintained
1	Mortdale	T4 Eastern Suburbs & Illawarra Line; Intercity services on the South Coast Line	Red (T)	T, H
1	Mortdale	T4 Eastern Suburbs & Illawarra Line; Intercity services on the South Coast Line	Green (H)	T, H
2	Flemington	T2 Inner West & Leppington, T3 Bankstown, T5 Cumberland, T7 Olympic Park and T8 Airport & South Lines; Intercity services on Blue Mountains Line (V sets only)	Blue	K, V
3	Hornsby	T1 North Shore & Western and T9 Northern Lines; Intercity services on the Central Coast & Newcastle Line (H sets only)	Black (T)	T, H, A
3	Hornsby	T1 North Shore & Western and T9 Northern Lines; Intercity services on the Central Coast & Newcastle Line (H sets only)	Green (H)	T, H, A
—N/a	Auburn Maintrain	UGL Unipart carry out maintenance at the various depots to which the trains are allocated but major work may be carried out at Auburn Maintrain.	—N/a	All except A, B and M
—N/a	Auburn	All A, B and M sets are stabled at the depot for the sector in which they operate but are maintained at Auburn by Downer Rail.	Stickers only (A, B)	A, B, M
—N/a	Auburn	All A, B and M sets are stabled at the depot for the sector in which they operate but are maintained at Auburn by Downer Rail.	Green (M)	A, B, M

=== Quiet carriages ===
Quiet carriages are designated carriages where noise made by passengers is requested to be kept to a minimum. Passengers are asked to place mobile phones on silent, move carriages in order to have a conversation with another passenger and use headphones when listening to music.

Quiet carriages are on Intercity services are located in four carriages on ten and eight car sets, two carriages on six and four car sets and one carriage on two car sets.

Quiet carriages were introduced on the Central Coast & Newcastle Line in early 2012 as a three-month trial. In September 2012, quiet carriages were permanently introduced and expanded to all intercity services operating on the Blue Mountains and South Coast Line.

== Performance ==
=== Punctuality ===
Intercity services are considered on-time if they operate within six minutes of their scheduled time. The target is for 92 percent of services to operate on-time.

Train punctuality by year
Network	Year							
Network	2019	2020	2021	2022	2023	2024	2025	2026
Suburban	91.3%	92.5%	95.0%	92.1%	85.1%	88.8%	84.0%	91.0%
Intercity	88.9%	86.2%	88.5%	85.4%	78.2%	80.3%	70.5%	76.5%

=== Patronage ===
The following table lists patronage figures for the network during the corresponding year.

Patronage by year (millions)
Network	Year						
Network	2019	2020	2021	2022	2023	2024	2025
Suburban	362.2	186.6	147.3	191.3	265.3	292.1	266.5
Intercity	41.0	20.0	15.7	18.8	27.7	29.0	26.3

2025–26 Sydney Trains patronage by line (Note: Figures based on Opal tap on and tap off data)
T1 North Shore & Western Line	79,173,811	
T2 Leppington & Inner West Line	56,339,459	
T3 Liverpool & Inner West Line	11,756,216	(Note: T3 patronage split between former route via Bankstown and current route via Strathfield. The Bankstown route closed 30 September 2024.)
T4 Eastern Suburbs & Illawarra Line	63,990,365	
T5 Cumberland Line	7,629,714	
T6 Lidcombe & Bankstown Line	3,307,374	
Olympic Park railway line	2,400,479	
T8 Airport & South Line	54,235,162	
T9 Northern Line	39,379,659	

2025 Transport for NSW patronage in Sydney by mode
Mode	Patronage	% of total
Metro	71,956,399	10.82
Train	284,972,638	42.84
Bus	242,983,455	36.53
Ferry	18,633,461	2.80
Light rail	46,640,237	7.01
Total	665,186,190	100.00

The following table shows the patronage of each line of the NSW TrainLink Intercity network for the year ending 30 June 2026, based on Opal tap on and tap off data.

2025–26 NSW TrainLink Intercity patronage by line
Blue Mountains Line	6,634,999
Central Coast & Newcastle Line	12,765,284
Hunter Line	839,041
South Coast Line	7,445,930
Southern Highlands Line	553,390

== Ticketing and costs ==
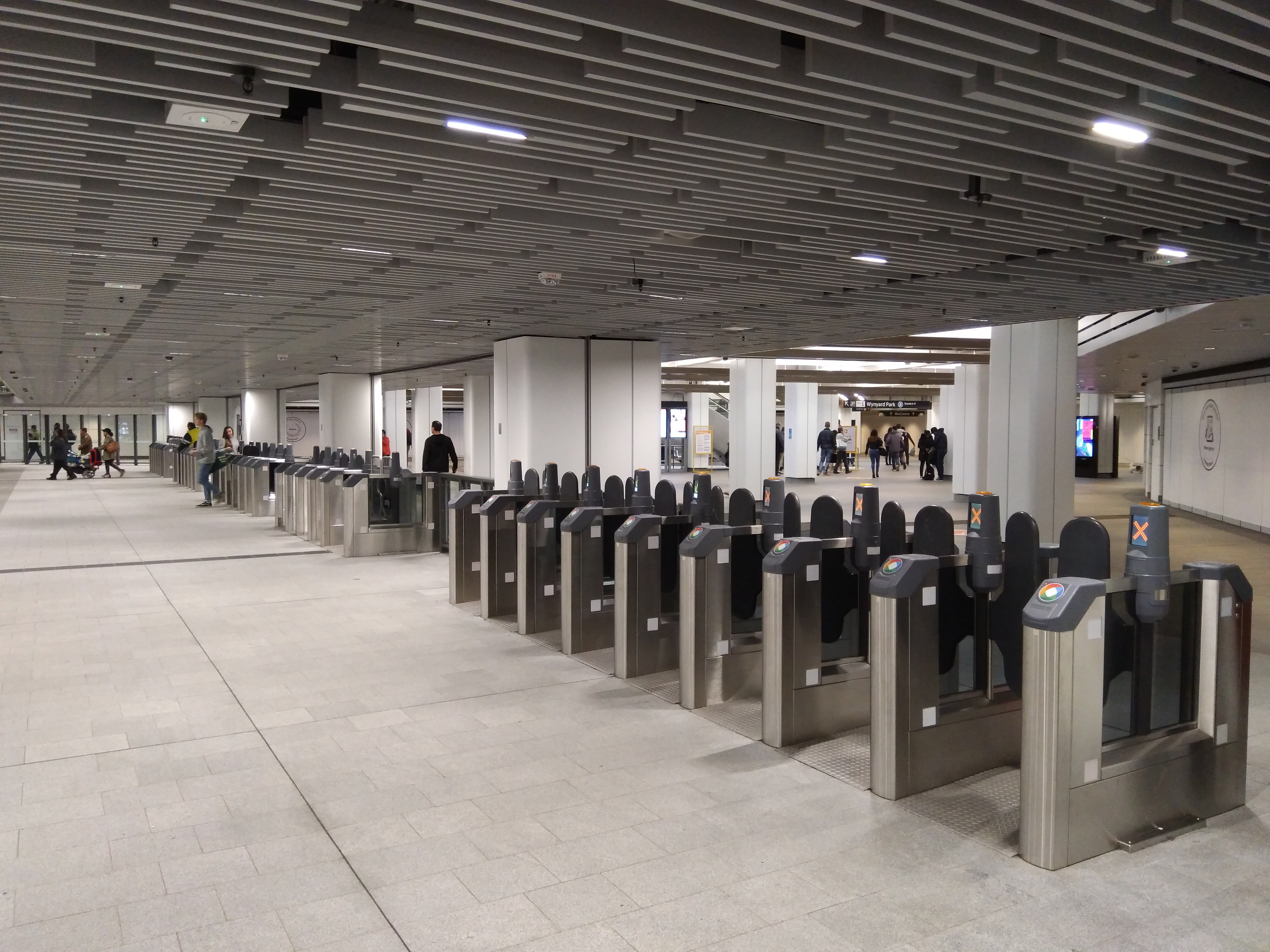
Ticket barriers at Wynyard station

Sydney Trains uses the Opal card ticketing system, which was introduced in April 2014, replacing an earlier magnetic stripe ticketing system. Passengers pay by tapping on at their origin, and tapping off at their destination. The fare system is fully integrated – trips involving suburban, metro and intercity services are calculated as a single fare and there is no interchange penalty. Students who use the Sydney Trains network to get to and from schools can apply for a free school Opal card. Opal is valid on bus, ferry, and light rail services. Separate fares apply for these modes. The following table lists Opal fares for reusable smartcards and single-trip tickets:

Metro and train
As of 14 July 2025	0–10 km	10–20 km	20–35 km	35–65 km	65 km+
Adult cards & contactless (peak)	$4.33	$5.38	$6.20	$8.28	$10.66
Adult cards & contactless (off-peak)	$3.03	$3.76	$4.34	$5.79	$7.46
Other cards (peak)	$2.16	$2.69^	$3.10^	$4.14^	$5.33^
Other cards (off-peak)	$1.51	$1.88	$2.17	$2.89^	$3.73^
Adult single trip	$5.20	$6.50	$7.40	$9.90	$12.80
Child/Youth single trip	$2.60	$3.20	$3.70	$4.80	$6.40

^ = $2.50 for Senior/Pensioner cardholders

A surcharge is levied when using the two privately operated stations serving Sydney Airport:

Airport station access fee
As of 14 July 2025	Adult cards	Other cards
Domestic or International Airport to/from all other stations	$17.92	$16.03
Domestic or International Airport to/from Green Square	$12.05	$12.05
Domestic or International Airport to/from Mascot	$9.65	$9.65
Domestic to/from International	$5.00	$5.00

As there are no return or periodical options available, reusable Opal cards include several caps to reduce the cost for frequent travellers:

Fare caps
As of 14 July 2025	Adult cards	Other concession cards	Senior/pensioner cards
Daily Monday–Thursday	$19.30	$9.65	$2.50
Daily Friday, Saturday and Sunday	$9.65	$4.80	$2.50
Weekly	$50.00	$25.00	$17.50
Weekly airport station access fee	$36.36	$32.58	$32.58

== See also ==
- List of urban rail systems in Australia
- NSW TrainLink
- Railways in Sydney
  - List of Sydney Trains railway stations
  - Proposed railways in Sydney
  - Sydney Metro

Preceded by CityRail	Operator of Sydney's suburban rail network 2013–present	Incumbent
