= Kangy Angy Maintenance Centre =

Train maintenance depot in Australia

- Interactive map of Kangy Angy Maintenance Centre

Location
- Location: Kangy Angy
- Coordinates: 33°19′52″S 151°23′57″E

Characteristics
- Owner: Transport Asset Manager of New South Wales
- Operator: Sydney Trains
- Rolling stock: D sets

History
- Opened: 24 February 2021

The Kangy Angy Maintenance Centre is a railway depot at Kangy Angy on the Central Coast, New South Wales to maintain the Mariyung D sets. The depot was officially opened on 24 February 2021.

The depot is almost 500,000 square metres (5,400,000 sq ft) in size and has about 6 kilometres (3.7 mi) of electric rail lines. It runs 24/7 and is operated by UGL Rail under a 15-year contract.

== History ==
In 2017, Transport for NSW awarded a contract to John Holland to build a new depot adjacent to the Main Northern line at Kangy Angy to maintain the Mariyung D sets. Construction commenced in May 2018 with the depot.

Major construction was completed in 2020 and the first D sets arrived at the facility in October 2020. The facility was officially opened on 24 February 2021.
