= New South Wales D set =

Rolling stock used for Sydney Trains' Intercity services

D set
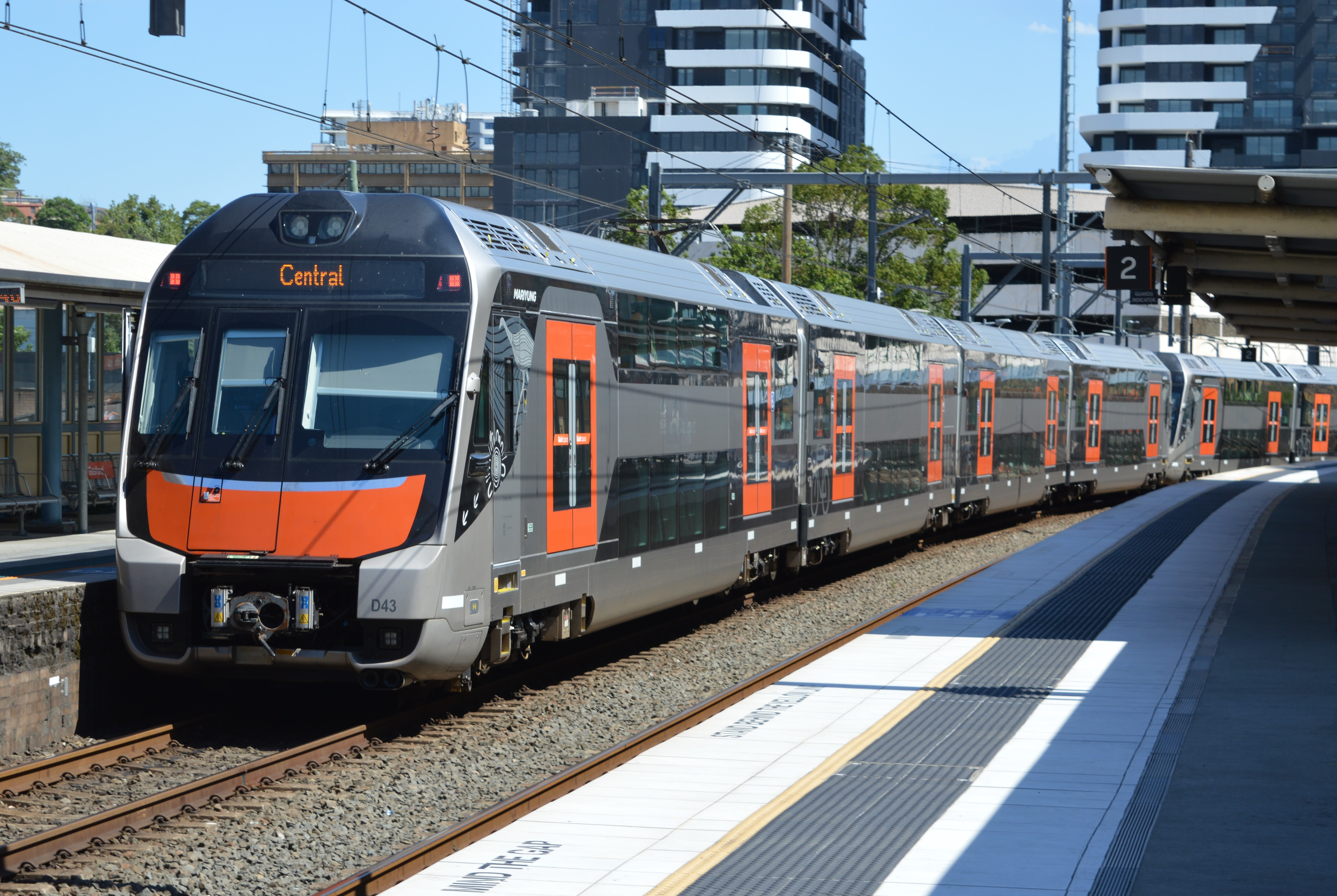
- D44 and D43 at Gosford station, January 2025

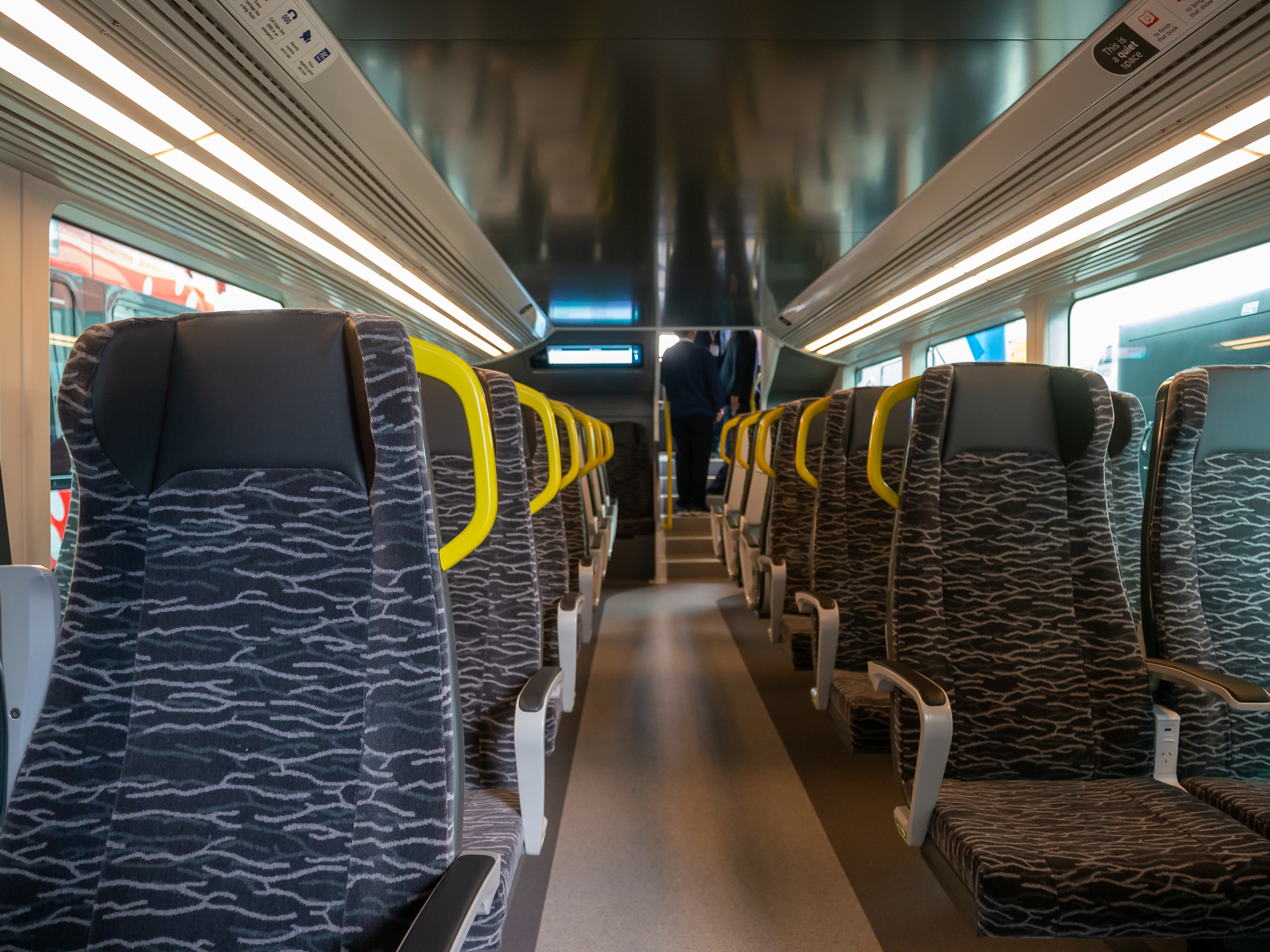
- Interior (lower deck)
- Stock type: Electric multiple unit
- In service: 3 December 2024 – present
- Manufacturer: Hyundai Rotem
- Built at: Changwon, South Korea
- Replaced: V sets; H sets (to be transferred to Sydney's suburban lines)
- Constructed: 2019–2024
- Entered service: 3 December 2024 (Central Coast and Newcastle Line); 13 October 2025 (Blue Mountains Line); 14 April 2026 (South Coast Line)
- Number built: 610 carriages (70 4-car sets, 55 6-car sets)
- Number in service: ~214+ carriages (~30 4-car sets & ~16 6-car sets) as of 26 November 2025
- Formation: 4-car sets: DD–DN–DND–DDA; 6-car sets: DD–DNL–DT–DN–DND–DDA
- Fleet numbers: D1–D70 (4-car sets); D101–D155 (6-car sets)
- Capacity: 325 seated (4-car sets); 491 seated (6-car sets)
- Operator: Sydney Trains
- Depot: Kangy Angy Maintenance Centre
- Lines served: Central Coast & Newcastle; Blue Mountains; South Coast

Specifications
- Car body construction: Stainless steel
- Train length: 81.55 m (267 ft 6 5/8 in) (4-car sets); 122.23 m (401 ft 1/4 in) (6-car sets)
- Car length: 20,435 mm (67 ft 1/2 in) (DD/DDA); 20,340 mm (66 ft 8 3/4 in) (DNL/DT/DN/DND)
- Width: 3,034 mm (9 ft 11 1/2 in)
- Height: 4,402 mm (14 ft 5 1/4 in)
- Doors: Plug-style, 2 per side
- Maximum speed: 160 km/h (99 mph) (design); 130 km/h (81 mph) (service)
- Weight: 199.8 t (196.6 long tons; 220.2 short tons) (4-car sets); 298 t (293 long tons; 328 short tons) (6-car sets)
- Traction system: Mitsubishi IGBT–VVVF
- Traction motors: 3-phase AC induction motor
- Acceleration: 0.84 m/s^{2} (2.8 ft/s^{2})
- Deceleration: 1.01 m/s^{2} (3.3 ft/s^{2}) (service); 1.10 m/s^{2} (3.6 ft/s^{2}) (emergency)
- Electric systems: 1,500 V DC (nominal) from overhead catenary
- Current collection: Pantograph
- UIC classification: 2′2′+Bo′Bo′+Bo′Bo′+2′2′ (4-car sets); 2′2′+Bo′Bo′+2′2′+Bo′Bo′+Bo′Bo′+2′2′ (6-car sets)
- Safety system: ETCS
- Coupling system: Dellner
- Track gauge: 1,435 mm (4 ft 8 1/2 in) standard gauge

The D sets, also referred to as the Mariyung trains, are a class of double-decker electric multiple units (EMU) that operate on Sydney Trains intercity lines in New South Wales, Australia. Built by Hyundai Rotem, the trains currently operate on the Central Coast & Newcastle Line, Blue Mountains Line and the South Coast Line. The D sets replaced the former V set fleet, and will allow for the reallocation of the entire H set fleet to Sydney's suburban line services once all sets are introduced into service.

The first trains were delivered in December 2019. After a protracted dispute between the government and the drivers' union over their safety, they entered service on 3 December 2024 on the Central Coast & Newcastle Line. On 13 October 2025, the D sets also entered service on the Blue Mountains Line. On 14 April 2026, the D sets also entered service on the South Coast Line.

== History ==
In May 2014, the Government of New South Wales announced its intention to purchase new carriages for the intercity network, then-operated by NSW TrainLink. The new trains would replace the V sets and allow the H sets to be cascaded to Sydney Trains suburban services. The class of trains were given the name Mariyung, a Dharug word for emu.

In August 2014, expressions of interest from manufacturers were called for. The following parties responded:

- Alstom
- Bombardier Transportation
- CAF
- Downer Rail / CNR Changchun
- Hyundai Rotem
- Stadler Rail
- UGL Rail / Mitsubishi Electric / CSR Corporation

In July 2015, the government announced that Alstom, Downer/Changchun, Stadler, and UGL/Mitsubishi Electric/CSR had been shortlisted to tender. Following the merger of CSR and the parent company of Changchun Railway Vehicles, Hyundai Rotem replaced CSR as a partner in the UGL/Mitsubishi Electric consortium. The consortia provided two variants of their designs – a longer train and shorter train. The Hyundai Rotem/UGL/Mitsubishi Electric consortium was announced as the successful bidder in August 2016. The companies formed a joint venture called RailConnect to manage the project. The trains are being built by Hyundai Rotem's Changwon factory in South Korea.

The initial contract covered the supply and maintenance of the 512 carriages which would consist of 77 4-car trains and 34 6-car trains. The maintenance contract runs for fifteen years from the delivery of the first train with an option for a five-year extension. In February 2019, a further 42 carriages were ordered to extend 21 of the 77 4-car trains into 6-car trains to allow for more 10-car train operations especially on the South Coast line during peak hour.

A separate contract was let to the John Holland Group for the construction of the Kangy Angy Maintenance Centre, which was completed in August 2020. A contract was let to Downer EDI to make modifications and upgrades to existing rail infrastructure across the electrified network to accommodate the new fleet. Platform extensions at multiple stations were also required to accommodate 10-car trains.

The first two 10-carriage trains were delivered in December 2019 and testing started the following month.

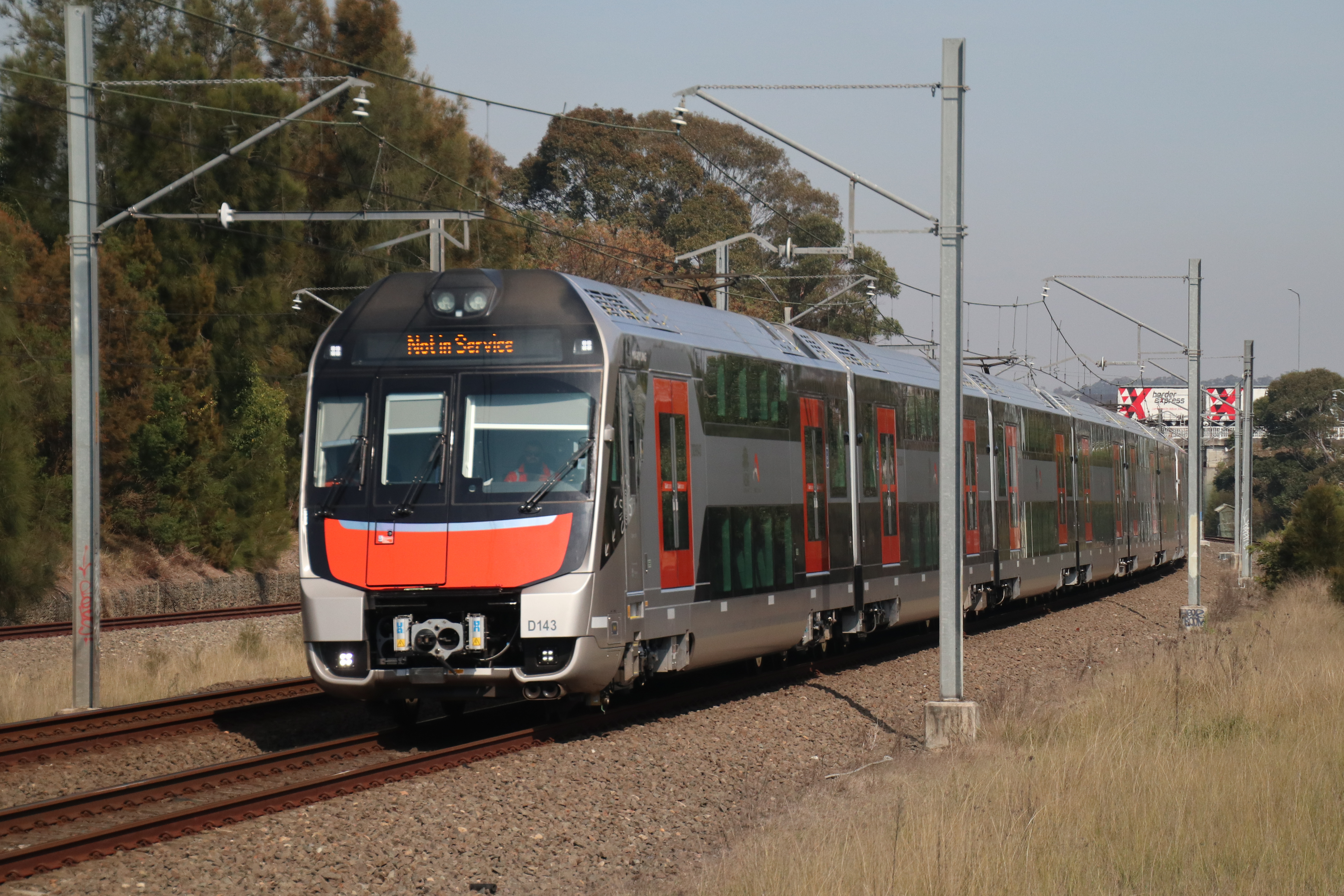
D143 and D43 at Doonside on a test run from Springwood, September 2023

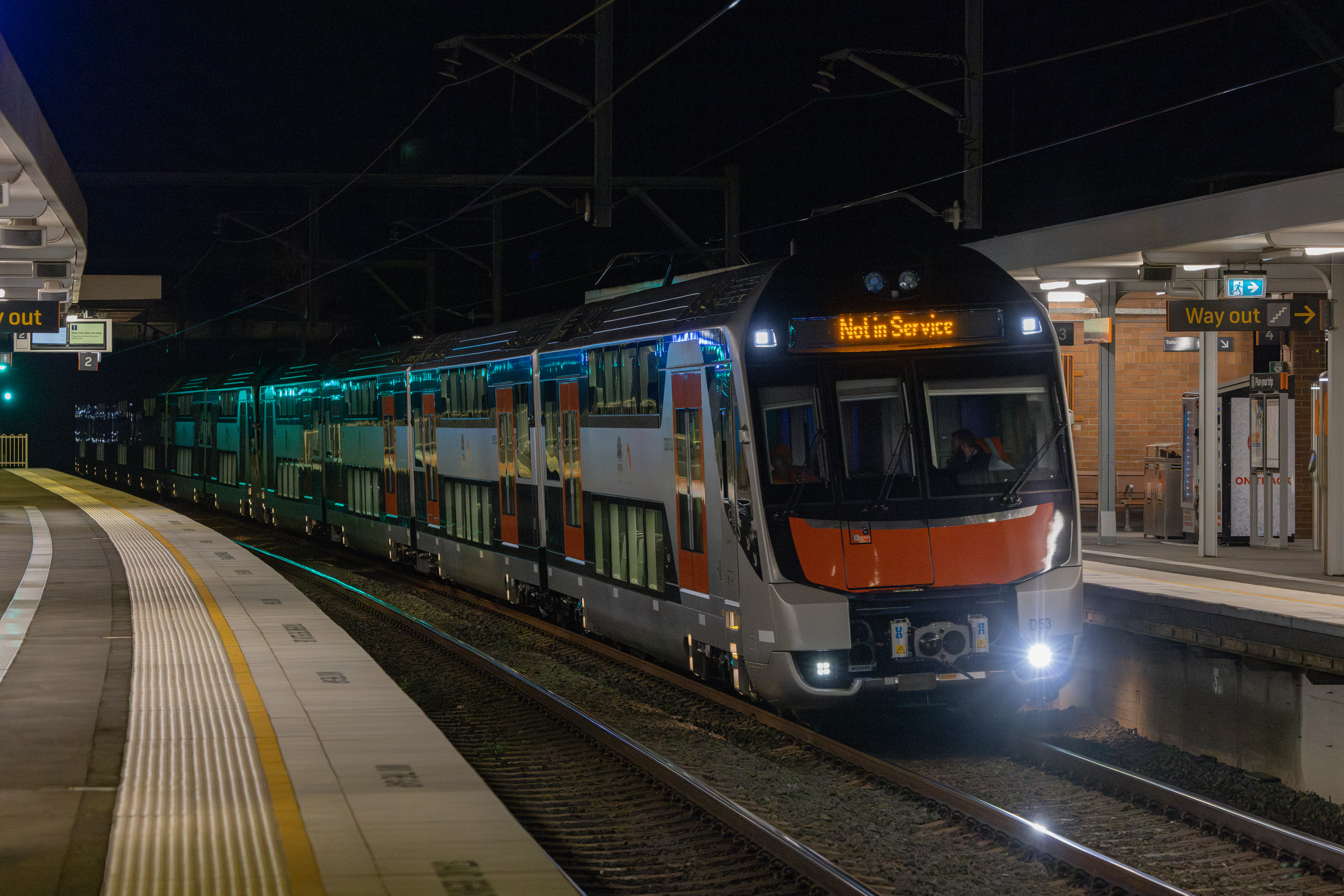
D53 and D153 at Rooty Hill on a test run to Mount Victoria, August 2024

During early ordering stages, the trains were simply referred to as the New Intercity Fleet (NIF). In April 2021, the name Mariyung, a Darug word for emu, was officially designated for the fleet.

In July 2021, the Mariyung fleet received its final approval to carry passengers from the independent Office of the National Rail Safety Regulator and were intended to enter service as soon as possible. At the time, 16 trains were being tested on the network and 8 of which were ready to progressively enter passenger service.

In September 2021, 56 additional carriages were ordered, bringing the total number of carriages to 610.

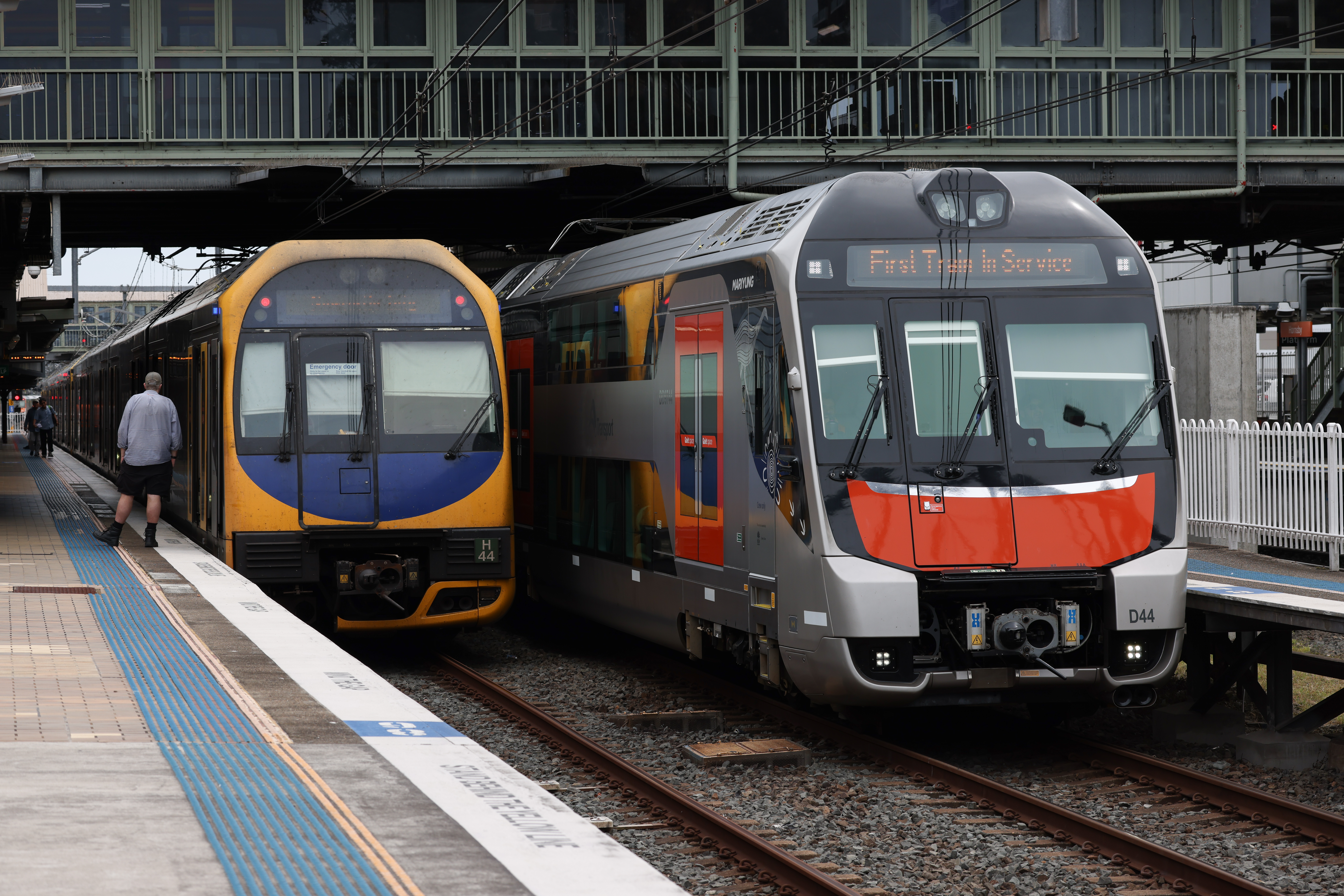
D44 and D51 at Hornsby on the first day of revenue service, December 2024

In December 2024, the first revenue service of the Mariyung fleet took place on the Central Coast and Newcastle Line with sets D54 & D53, operating the 8:21 service from Newcastle Interchange to Central. Additionally, due to excessive passenger numbers for the inaugural service, an additional unscheduled service from Gosford to Central with sets D44 and D51 ran approximately 10 minutes behind the first service. In June 2025, numerous 6-car sets entered service which enabled 10-car services to operate on the Central Coast and Newcastle Line.

In September 2025, it was announced that the Mariyung fleet would commence services on the Blue Mountains Line on 13 October 2025.

In October 2025, the first Mariyung service on the Blue Mountains Line departed from Lithgow at 6:24am, and made its way to Central.

In April 2026, the first Mariyung service on the South Coast Line departed from Kiama at 7:56am, and made its way to Central.

== Design ==
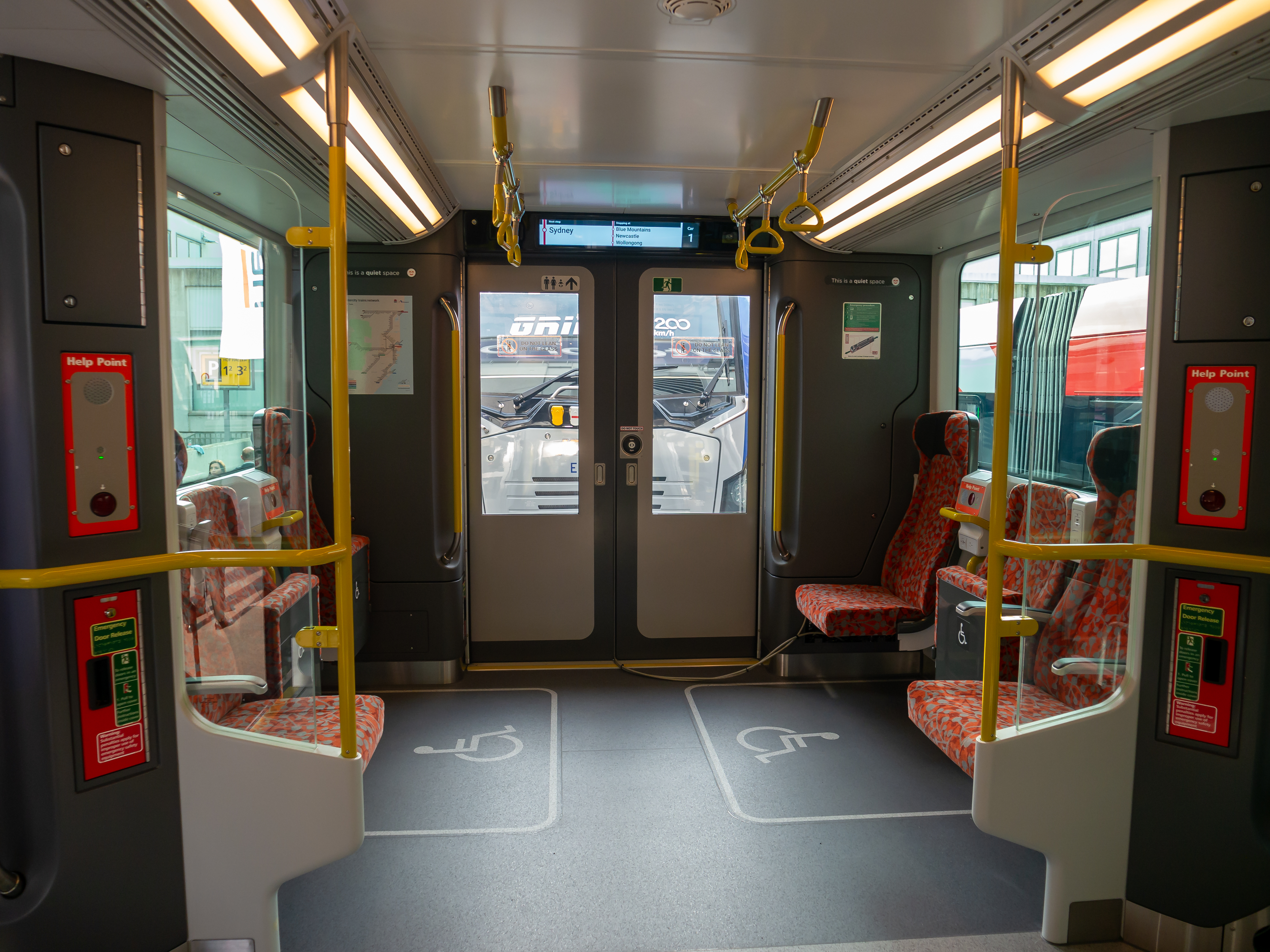
Vestibule

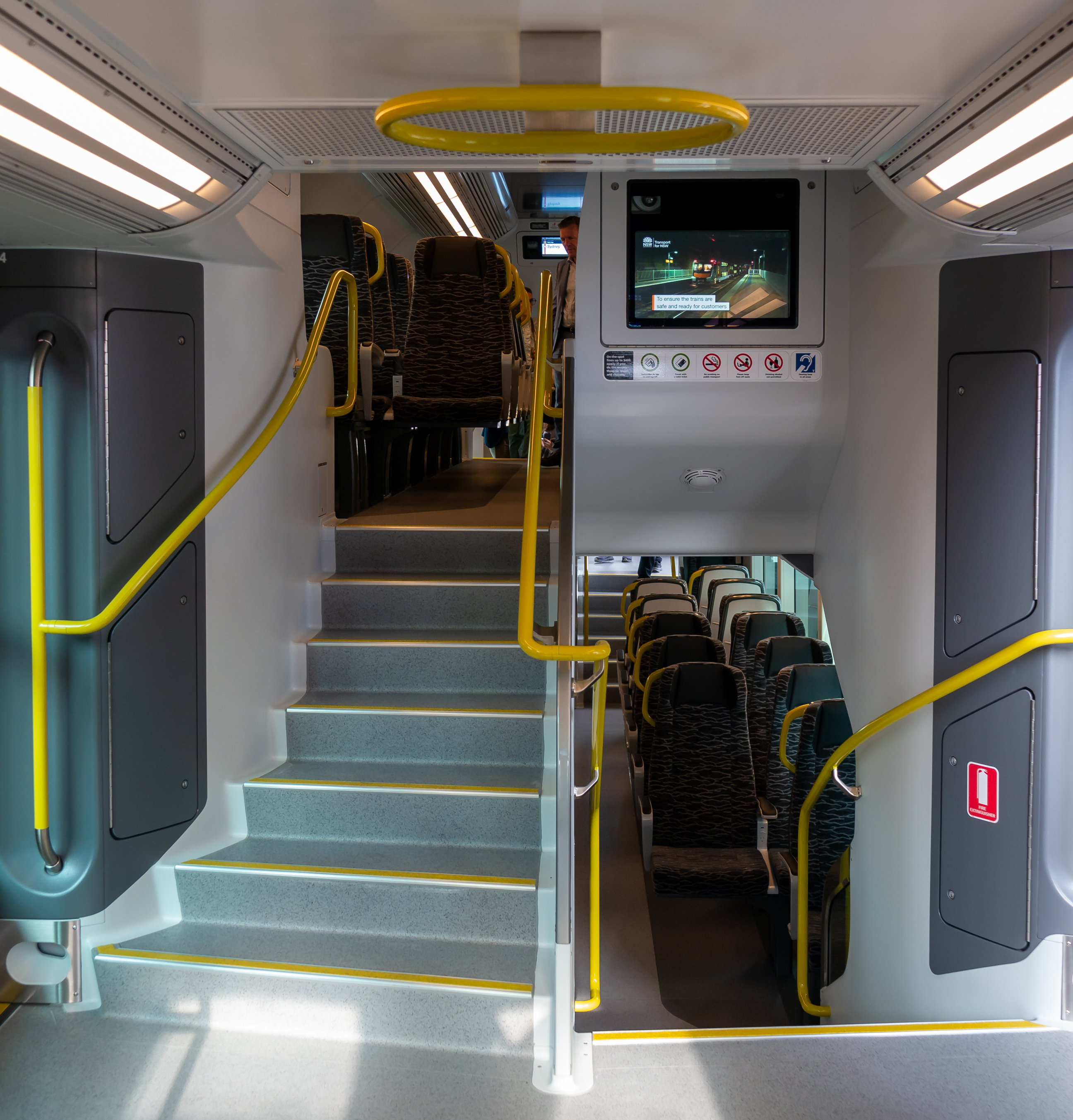
Stairwell

The trains are double deck electric multiple units measuring 163 m (534 ft 9 in) for an 8-car set or 204 m (669 ft 3 in) for a 10 car-set. They include accessible toilets and dedicated space for luggage, prams, bicycles and wheelchairs. Fixed seats on the upper and lower decks are in a two by two arrangement. The seating includes cup holders, tray tables and arm rests. Each seat features a charging station for mobile devices. The trains are designed to be operated with or without guards, with tender documents stating the trains must support one-man operation. The trains are designed to operate up to 160 km/h & follow the enhanced curving XPT speeds. To achieve this top speed (a first for double-deck rolling stock in Australia) Hyundai-Rotem has supplied specially designed bogies and traction motor gearing arrangements, which results in a slightly lower acceleration when compared to the H set it is replacing.

The new trains are wider than the V sets they replace and required modifications to be made to parts of the Blue Mountains line route (as had previously been completed on the Central Coast & Newcastle line, the South Coast line to Kiama and the Blue Mountains line to Springwood only) to create sufficient clearance from adjacent structures. A contract was awarded to the Continuum Alliance, an alliance between Transport for NSW, CPB Contractors and Lendlease, to make these modifications. Work started in February 2019 and was completed in July 2020.

== Background ==
=== Proportions ===
In 2015, the project reached a $1.1 billion blowout due to modifications that were required for the design of the train, changing proportions from almost identical to the V sets to the standard suburban double decker proportions.

In October 2016, it was announced that the D sets would be 3,034 mm (9 ft 11.4 in) wide and 135 mm (5.3 in) wider than the V sets they would replace. This required works to provide additional clearance on several sections of the Blue Mountains Line between Springwood, Katoomba and Lithgow, including the heritage-listed Ten Tunnels Deviation. The increased length of the trains also required platform extensions at Linden and Warrimoo.

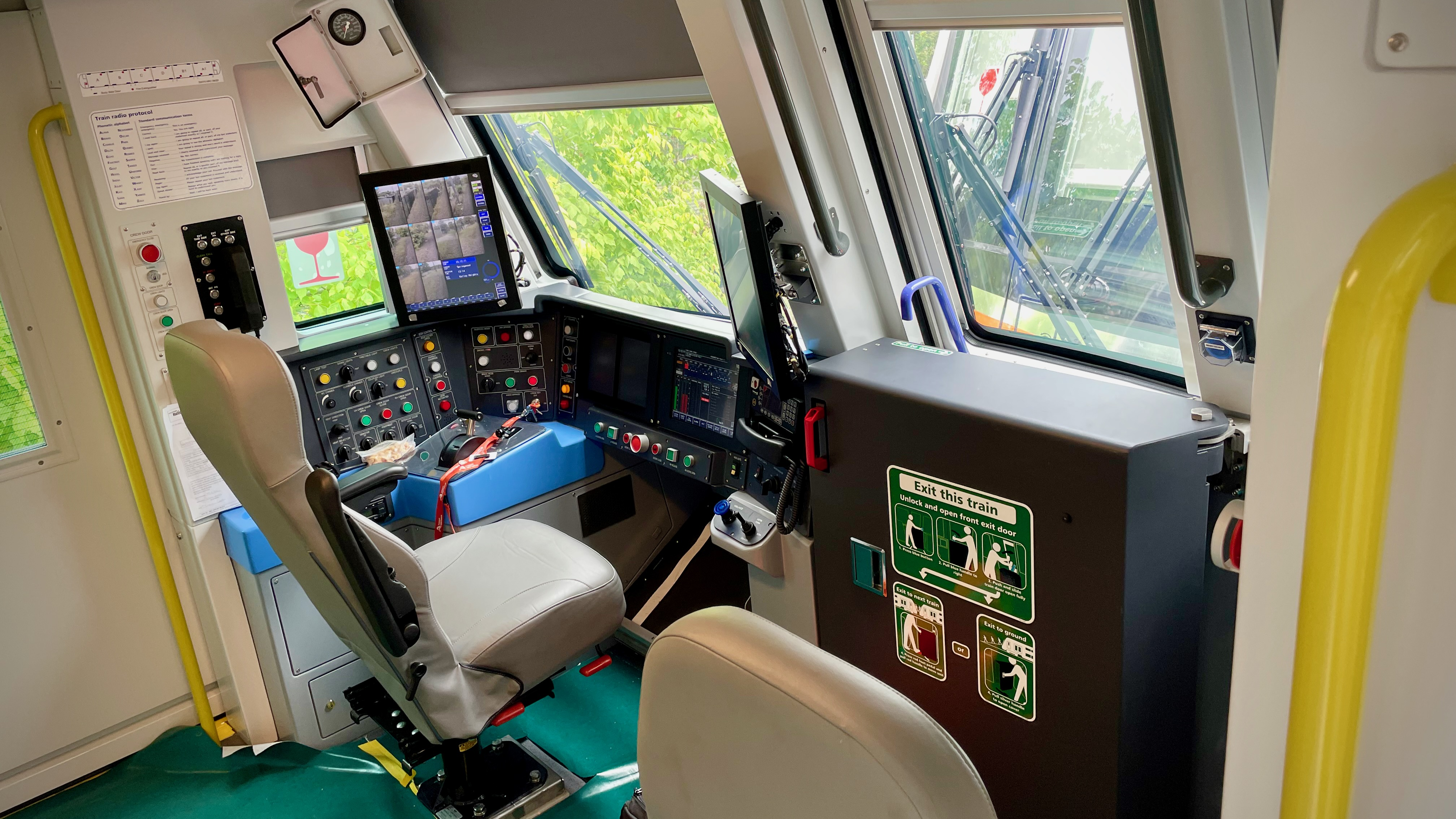
Driver's cab

=== Union opposition and safety concerns ===
In 2018, it was announced that the trains would have a maximum of two staff members on board, suggesting that the train guard be either replaced by a customer service role or merged with a customer service role, ruling out Driver Only Operation. The Rail Tram and Bus Union (RTBU) welcomed any announcement regarding safety and retaining train guards.

However, in 2019 it was announced that Driver Only Operation would be implemented, with the driver viewing the side of the train via several CCTV cameras. The RTBU criticised Driver Only Operation as unsafe, arguing that solely relying on CCTV alone had potential weaknesses and could not replace the safety role of a guard on board.

In February 2020, the RTBU announced that members would refuse to staff the New Intercity Fleet over safety and employment concerns.

On 27 November 2020, a strike in protest of the safety concerns was performed by the RTBU, shutting down all intercity services effective immediately until 7 am.

A confidential 2018 report to the NSW government revealed that the doors could easily fail when opened at speed, which was only announced to the public in 2021.

On 5 February 2021, an incident where a commuter fell between a train and the platform at Hornsby station in January was highlighted by the RTBU as a potentially fatal situation if it had occurred with a D set.

On 2 March 2021, the Customer Service Guard position was not recognised by the Fair Work Commission.

In November 2021, an 18 month delay of entry into service was announced due to the union standoff and the COVID-19 pandemic.

Throughout December 2021, the RTBU carried out a series of industrial actions in protest.

=== Approval by the Office of the National Safety Regulator ===
In July 2021, the independent Office of the National Rail Safety Regulator (ONRSR) deemed the fleet to be safe. Sue McCarrey, CEO of the ONRSR, outlined that they had worked with the operator since design stage right through to testing, pledging that ongoing safety audits would continue through to their operation. Additionally, McCarrey concluded that there was no greater risk than the current older fleet and in fact the use of technology on the new fleet would make them even safer, saying: "We believe that risk is being managed through the technology on the train. The operating model we have approved for the NIF includes the use of a driver, a guard and the use of CCTV cameras at each door providing both the guard and the driver a view down the entire platform. Both the driver and the guard have access to screens to show them what is actually happening along the entire platform". McCarrey made it clear that as an independent regulator she is not part of the current negotiations between the RTBU and the train operator (NSW Trains) and nor should she be, however if those negotiations resulted in a change to the operating model, then the ONRSR would have to relitigate those proposed changes and once again complete that independent check to ensure that the changes proposed to the train operations continue to effectively manage the risks.

On 26 November 2024, the D sets were given approval to operate in passenger service with modifications on only the Central Coast & Newcastle Line from the ONRSR. On 30 September 2025, it was announced that the ONRSR approved the introduction of services on the Blue Mountains Line. The trains have been approved for 4/6/8 car running on the South Coast Line, however approval is yet to be granted for 10 car services on the South Coast Line.

=== Fair Work Commission ===
On 18 February 2022, Sydney Trains and Transport for NSW lodged an application to the Fair Work Commission seeking to suspend or terminate any further industrial action from the RTBU regarding the D sets, the Transport Asset Holding Entity, wages and any other cause. After the February shutdown the Fair Work action was suspended.

=== Maintenance ===
In September 2017, the Central Coast Express Advocate opposed the Kangy Angy Maintenance Centre citing issues of noise and flooding.

In December 2021, it was announced that only 20 out of 300 jobs at the Kangy Angy Maintenance Centre, had been filled locally, which was heavily criticised by several Labor MPs including Chris Minns.

=== Lowering of permitted service speed ===
The train is specified and designed by Hyundai Rotem to be able to operate to a maximum service speed of 160 km/h (99 mph). However, their maximum service speed has been limited to 130 km/h (81 mph), despite previous strategic planning assuming a service speed of 160 km/h.

== Services ==
The trains currently operate on the Central Coast & Newcastle Line on the majority of services. Services operate as either 8 or 10 cars with a small number of 4- or 6-car services. The trains also operate on the Blue Mountains Line as either 10- or 6-car services, and on the South Coast Line as either 4-, 6- or 8-car services until 10-car running is approved.
