= List of urban rail systems in Australia =

Urban rail transport forms a vital part of transportation in major Australian cities.

== Definitions ==
The Commonwealth government Bureau of Infrastructure, Transport and Regional Economics and industry peak body Australasian Railway Association, who jointly publish the Trainline statistical report categorise Australian passenger systems as "urban" or "non-urban".

Urban networks are further classified as "light rail" or "heavy rail". Light rail in Australia includes established tram networks in Melbourne and Adelaide continuously operating in various forms since the 19th century, as well as networks in other cities newly constructed after the cessation of tram operation. Heavy rail networks primarily describe passenger operations over parts of mixed-traffic rail systems centred on capital cities and also includes the Sydney Metro system, which operates on its own dedicated corridor.

Non-urban passenger networks are classified according to their passenger task. "Inter-city" or "regional" networks are defined to be those whose primary market "...include[s] daily commuting or day return business or leisure travel" to major cities and are therefore included in this article. Other markets, such as long-distance operations between cities and regional centres, tourist-focused and heritage services, are excluded from this list.

== Urban rail systems ==
Average daily patronage, where possible, is taken from the last calendar or financial year (FY). System lengths are given in route kilometres. The largest, most extensive urban (as distinct from interurban) system is found in Melbourne, while the system with the highest patronage is found in Sydney. Patronage figures are for 2018–19 unless otherwise stated.

Primary City	System	Other cities served	Type	Average daily boardings	Lines	Stations/ stops	Length		Average daily boardings	
Primary City	System	Other cities served	Type	Average daily boardings	Lines	Stations/ stops	km	mi	per km	per mi
Sydney	Sydney Trains		Commuter rail	955,089 (2024)	9	161	355.5	220.9	2,686	4,323
Sydney	Sydney Metro		Rapid transit	242,678 (2024)	1	21	52	32	4,666	7,509
Sydney	Sydney Light Rail		Light rail	128,171 (2025)	3	42	24.7	15.3	5,189	8,351
Sydney	Parramatta Light Rail		Light rail	12,096 (FY 2025)	1	16	12	7.5	1,008	1,622
Sydney	NSW TrainLink (commuter services)	Newcastle, Wollongong, Scone, Dungog, Goulburn, Bathurst, Nowra (Bomaderry)	Commuter rail	97,103 (2024)	5	156	977	607	99	159
Newcastle	Newcastle Light Rail		Light rail	2,732 (2024)	1	6	2.7	1.7	1,011	1,627
Melbourne	Metro Trains Melbourne		Commuter rail	554,276 (FY 2026)	17	227	430	270	1,289	2,074
Melbourne	Yarra Trams		Tram	425,489 (FY 2026)	24	1,763	250	160	1,701	2,737
Melbourne	V/Line (commuter services)	Geelong, Bendigo, Ballarat, Seymour, Latrobe Valley	Commuter rail	57,500	5	66	610	380	94	151
Perth	Transperth	Mandurah	Commuter rail	202,053 (FY 2026)	8	86	244	152	828	1,333
Brisbane	Queensland Rail Citytrain	Gold Coast, Ipswich, Sunshine Coast	Commuter rail	150,500 (2025)	13	154	689	428	218	351
Gold Coast	G:link		Light rail		1	19	20	12		
Adelaide	Adelaide Metro		Commuter rail	42,880	6	81	126	78	340	550
Adelaide	Glenelg trams		Tram		3	33	15	9.3		
Canberra	Canberra Light Rail		Light rail		1	14	12	7.5		

== See also ==
- Rail transport in Australia
- History of rail transport in Australia
