= New South Wales Hunter railcar =

Class of diesel multiple unit

Hunter railcar
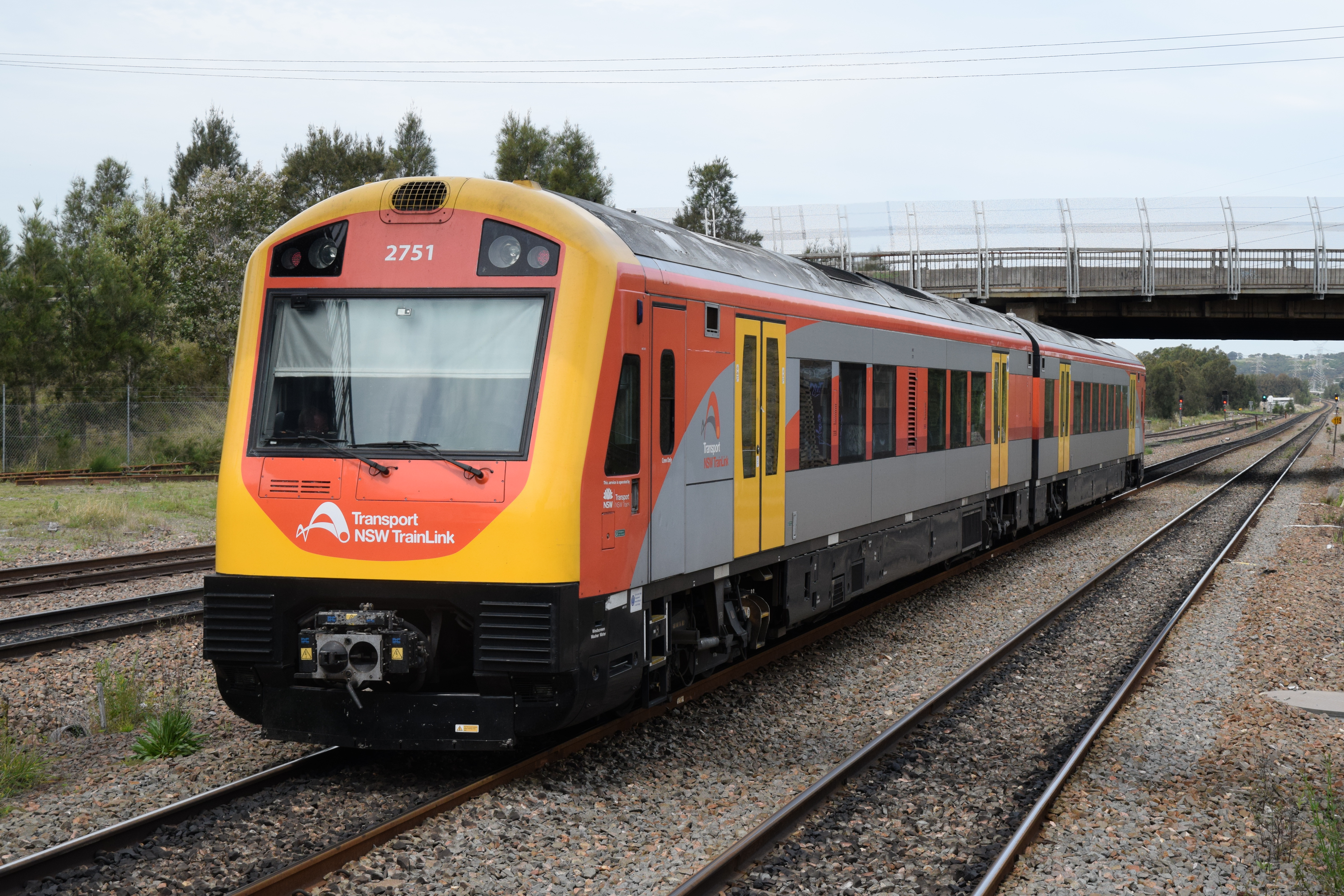
- 2751 and 2701 in NSW TrainLink livery departing Sandgate

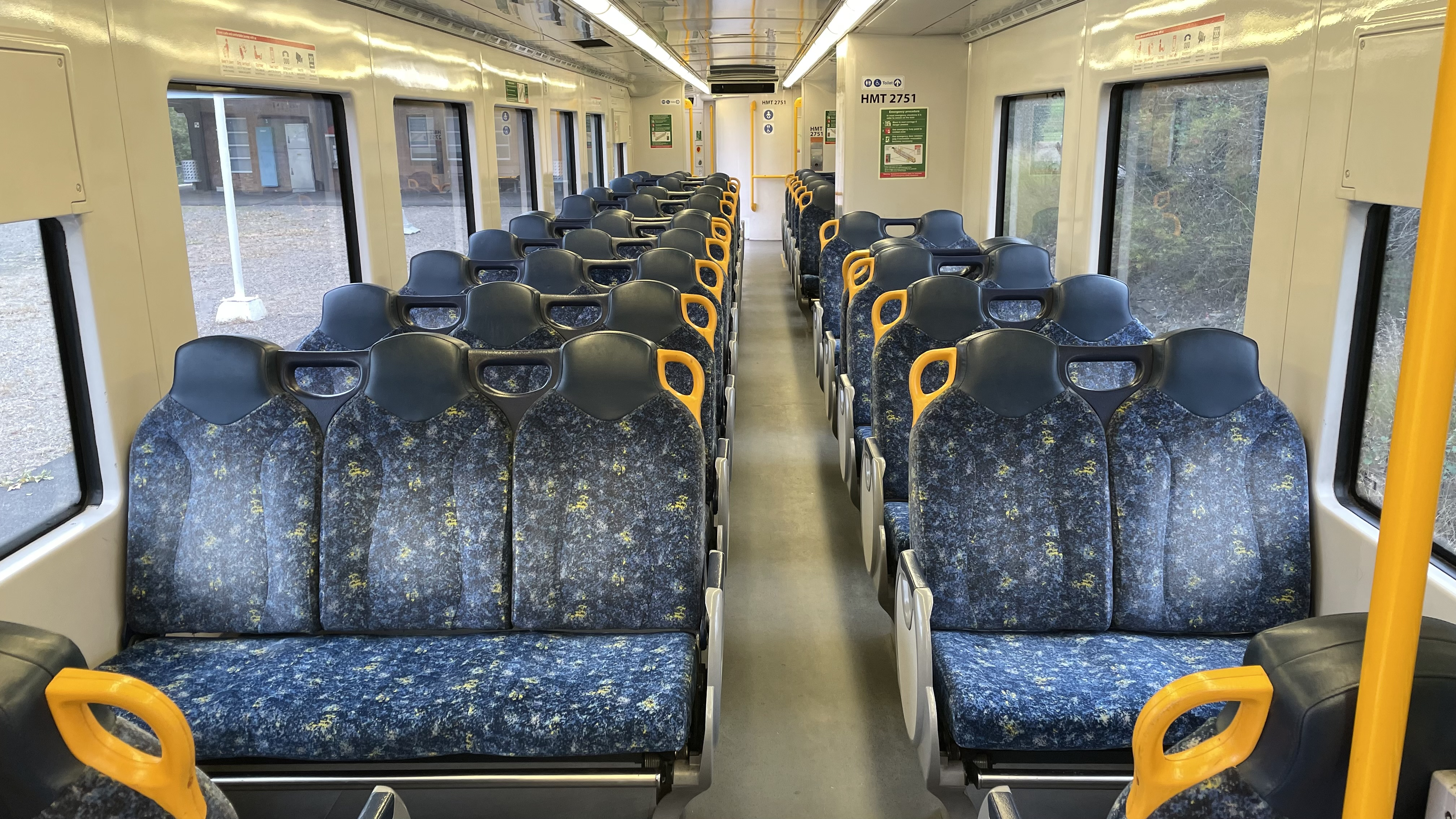
- Interior of a Hunter railcar in June 2024
- Stock type: Diesel multiple unit
- In service: 2006–present
- Manufacturer: UGL Rail
- Built at: Broadmeadow
- Replaced: 620/720 railcars
- Constructed: 2005–2006
- Entered service: 23 November 2006
- Number built: 14 carriages (7 sets)
- Number in service: 14 carriages (7 sets)
- Formation: 2-car sets
- Fleet numbers: HM 2701–2707; HMT 2751–2757
- Capacity: 77 (HM) 69 (HMT)
- Operator: Sydney Trains
- Depot: Broadmeadow
- Line served: Hunter

Specifications
- Car body construction: Stainless steel with fibreglass end bonnets
- Train length: 50.5 m (165 ft 8 3/16 in)
- Car length: 25.25 m (82 ft 10 1/8 in)
- Width: 2.93 m (9 ft 7 3/8 in)
- Height: 4.24 m (13 ft 10 7/8 in)
- Floor height: 1.27 m (4 ft 2 in)
- Maximum speed: 160 km/h (99 mph) (design); 145 km/h (90 mph) (service)
- Weight: 63 t (62 long tons; 69 short tons) (HM); 63.5 t (62.5 long tons; 70.0 short tons) (HMT)
- Prime mover: Cummins QSK19–R
- Power output: 559 kW (750 hp)
- Transmission: Voith T312 bre
- Auxiliaries: Cummins 6ISBe–G1 – 150 kW (201 hp)
- Bogies: PKA (powered), NKA (trailer)
- Coupling system: Dellner
- Track gauge: 1,435 mm (4 ft 8 1/2 in) standard gauge

The Hunter railcars, also referred to as the J sets, are a type of diesel multiple unit (DMU) operated by Sydney Trains on the Hunter Line in New South Wales, Australia. Built by UGL Rail between November 2006 and September 2007, they initially operated for CityRail. The railcars have received only one refurbishment in their years of service. This changed their livery from CityRail, to NSW TrainLink.

== History ==
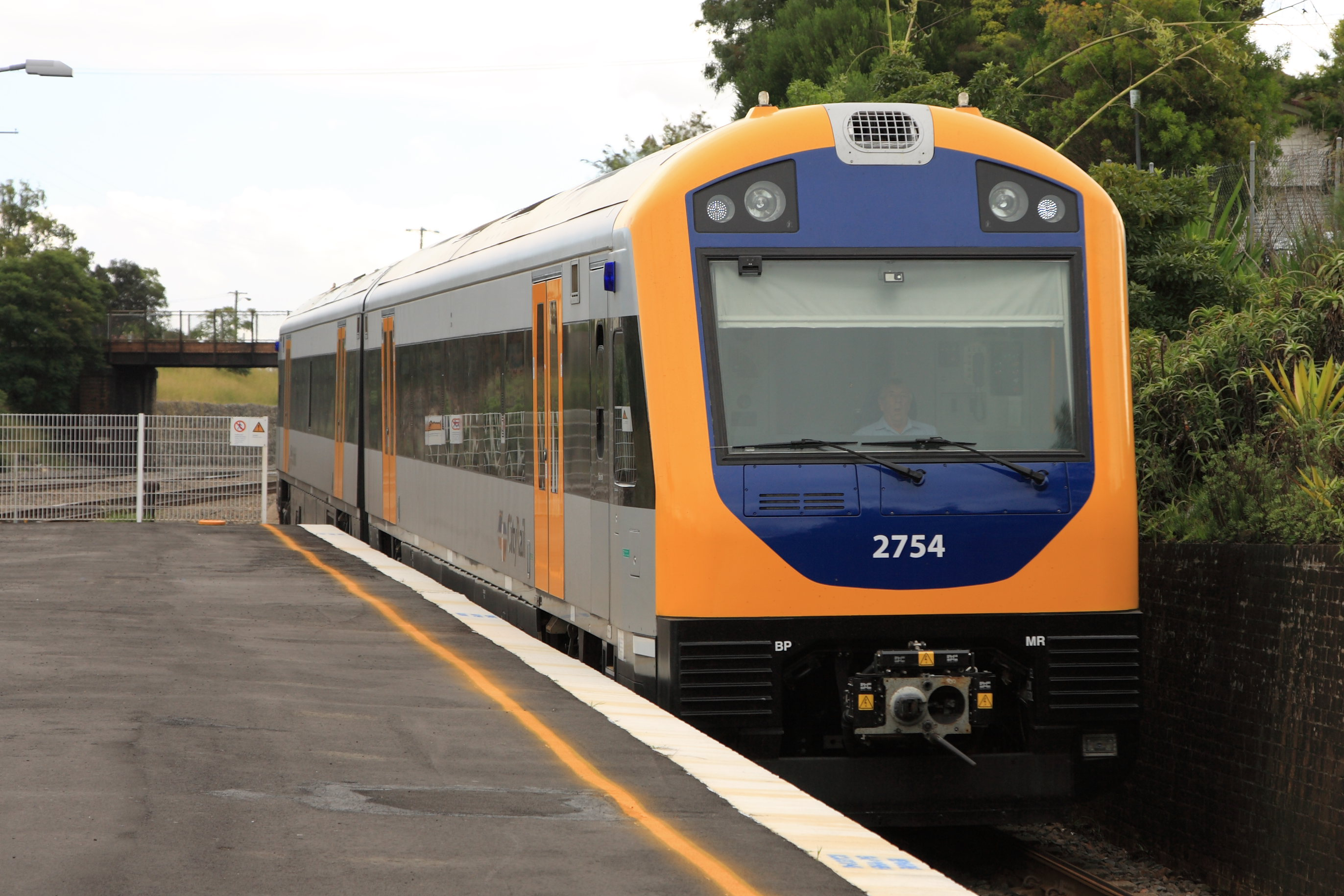
2754 and 2704 in original CityRail livery approaching Victoria Street station

In 2001, the Government of New South Wales called for tenders for seven two-carriage railcar sets to replace the remaining 620/720 railcars on Hunter Line services, with a contract awarded to Goninan in 2002.

Each set comprises two powered cars with one having a toilet. The first set entered service on 23 November 2006, operating a small number of Newcastle to Telarah services on Thursday and Fridays only. The second set entered service on 8 January 2007 also operating a limited number of services. By September 2007, all seven had entered service. They operate services from Newcastle to Dungog and Scone alongside the Endeavours.

All sets passed from CityRail to NSW TrainLink with the Hunter line services in July 2013. In 2014/15, they received refurbished seats, improved toilet facilities, anti-graffiti interior paint and NSW TrainLink vinyls.

== Design ==
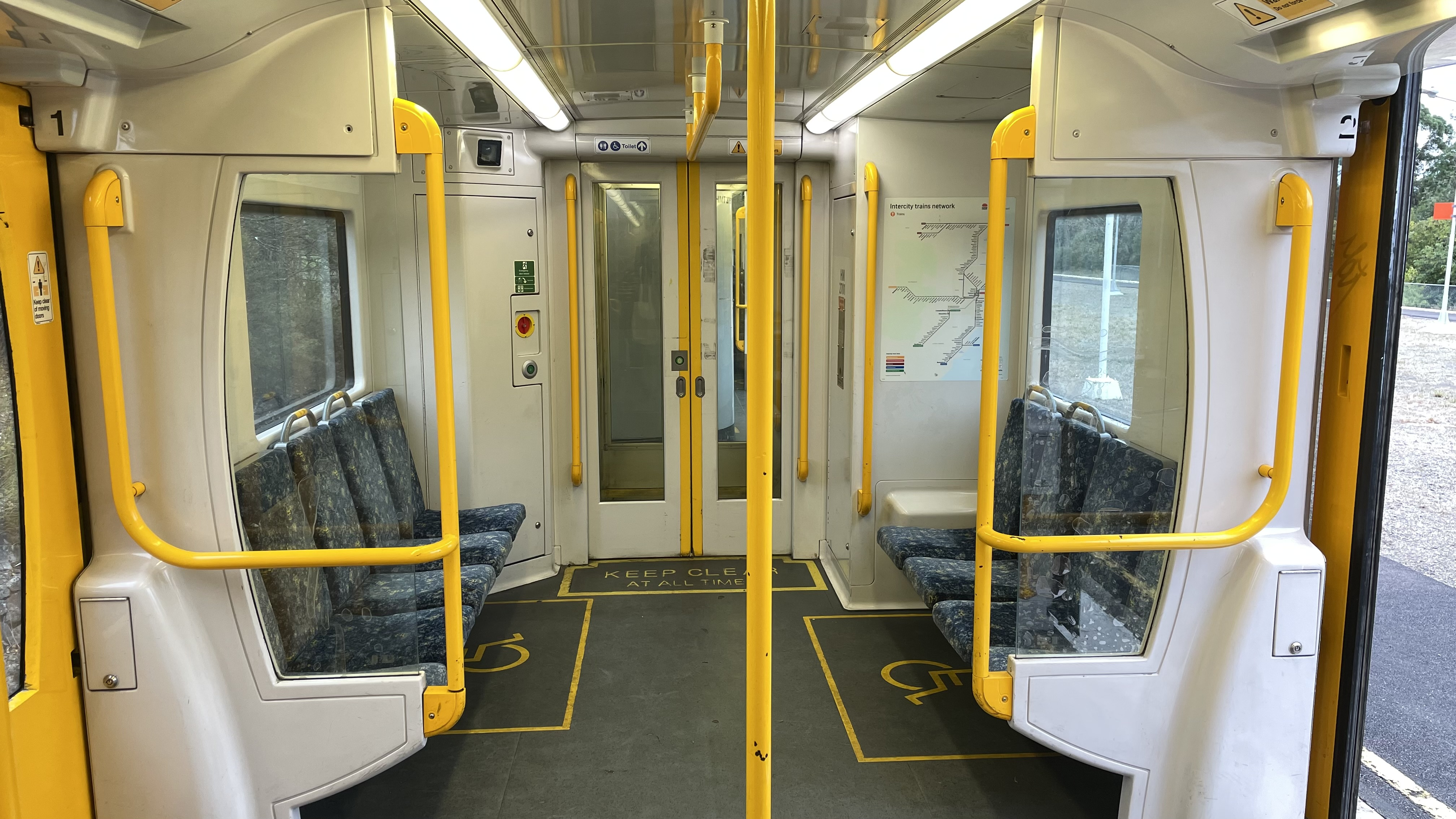
Vestibule

The design of the J sets is derived from the Transwa Prospector and AvonLink – the major difference being the driving cars are each single-engined instead of dual-engined, due to the lower top speed requirement for the Hunter line. Reversible seating is covered with durable, vandal proof woollen moquette fabric in 3x2 formation, and have retractable footrests. CCTV is installed. The cars have been fitted with Dellner SP couplers. They are able to absorb the impact of a collision, and the anti-climbers will also reduce the force of impact. They also have a different body design. Instead of the entire body being of the same design, such as the Tangara, the driver's cab is built as a protective cage, made of fibreglass, which stretches to the end of the guard's door. The stainless steel paneling starts at the guard's door. The guard's door is designed to operate separately from the passenger doors.

The trains have multiple-unit capability with the earlier Endeavour and Xplorers, but only in the event of failure or for empty coaching stock movements. These cars normally operate as two-car sets, however during peak periods they can operate as four-car sets.

Each car is powered by a Cummins QSK19-R diesel engine rated at 559 kW (750 hp) at 1800rpm coupled to a Voith T312bre hydraulic transmission driving both axles on one bogie via Voith SK-485 final drives. An auxiliary 150 kW (201 hp) Cummins 6ISBe-G1 diesel engine drives a Newage Stamford UCI274H alternator to supply power for the air conditioning and lighting. Hunter Railcars are capable of 160 km/h (99 mph) but in service are limited to a maximum of 145 km/h (90 mph).

Digital voice announcements: Next Stop, approaching station, platform information, door alert chime, current station
