= South Coast Daylight Express =

Former express train route in New South Wales, Australia

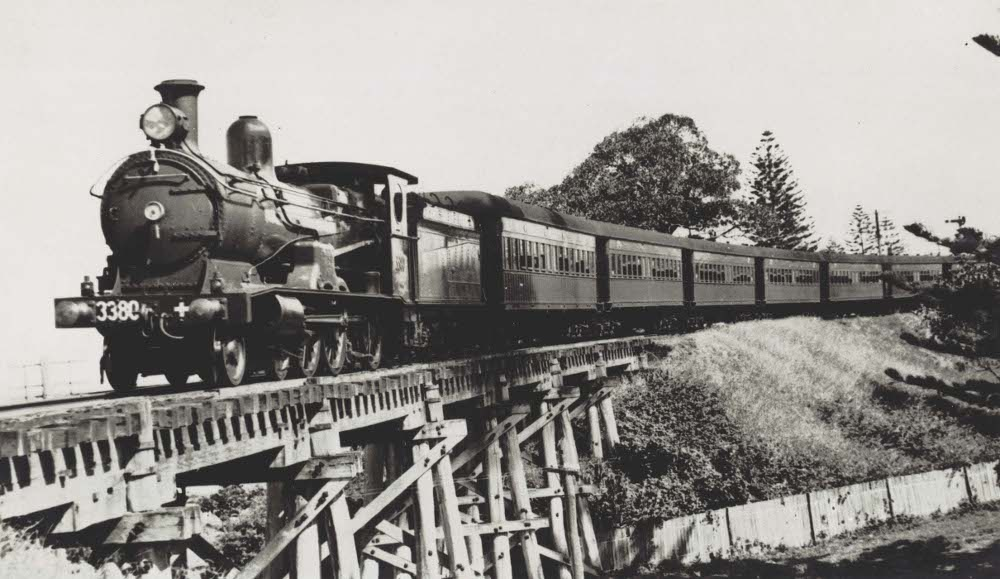
- Shoalhaven Street, Kiama

Overview
- Service type: Passenger train
- Status: Ceased
- First service: 1933
- Last service: 20 January 1991
- Former operators: New South Wales Government Railways; Public Transport Commission; State Rail Authority; CityRail

Route
- Termini: Sydney; Bomaderry
- Distance travelled: 153 kilometres (95 mi)
- Service frequency: Daily
- Line used: Illawarra

The South Coast Daylight Express was a limited stops passenger train operated by the New South Wales Government Railways and its successors between Sydney and Bomaderry from 1933 until January 1991.

== History ==
After departing Sydney Central it travelled via the Illawarra line calling at Hurstville, Wollongong, Kiama, Gerringong, Berry and Bomaderry. It continued to operate after the line was electrified to Wollongong in January 1986 but was withdrawn in January 1991 with DEB set railcars connecting with V set electrics at Wollongong.

== Rolling stock ==
It was originally formed of R set carriages painted green and cream. From 1949 until 1957 it was formed of air-conditioned HUB carriages.

In March 1961, the 1100 class Budd diesel railcars took over. From the late 1970s they were joined by the 1200 class Tulloch diesel railcars. Following a derailment at Erskineville in February 1983, they began to have their engines removed and became locomotive hauled stock with a 44, 421 or 422 class diesel usually hauling the sets. In 1986, locomotive 4499 was repainted in a unique primarily pale grey livery with red, orange and yellow ends and red and orange "L7" logos similar to the minimised "Candy" colour-blocking used on the Intercity electric fleet and became known among enthusiasts as "Grey Ghost". This livery had been conceived for use on the South Coast Daylight Express service, however operational requirements dictated that 4499 was often to be found on other traffic, whilst other locomotives were rostered to the South Coast Daylight Express service. At various times DEB railcar, HUB and RUB stock operated the service.
