= Toolijooa railway station =

Former railway station in New South Wales, Australia

Toolijooa

General information
- Location: Australia
- Coordinates: 34°45′55″S 150°46′50″E
- System: Regional rail
- Line: South Coast railway line, New South Wales

Other information
- Status: Closed

History
- Opened: 1893
- Closed: 1974

Services
Preceding station	Former services	Following station
Berry towards Bomaderry	South Coast Line	Gerringong towards Sydney
Location

Toolijooa railway station is a closed railway station on the South Coast railway line in New South Wales, Australia. The station opened on 2 June 1893 and closed on 19 October 1974. The station was equipped with a platform, waiting shed, and hand signal to allow the train to stop to pick up passengers where necessary. In 1899, a request for additional accommodation and sanitary rooms for men and women was approved by the Railway Commissioners. A siding was planned for the station, but the matter was held in abeyance due to land needing to be dedicated for the road approach.
