= Yallah railway station =

Former railway station in New South Wales, Australia

Yallah
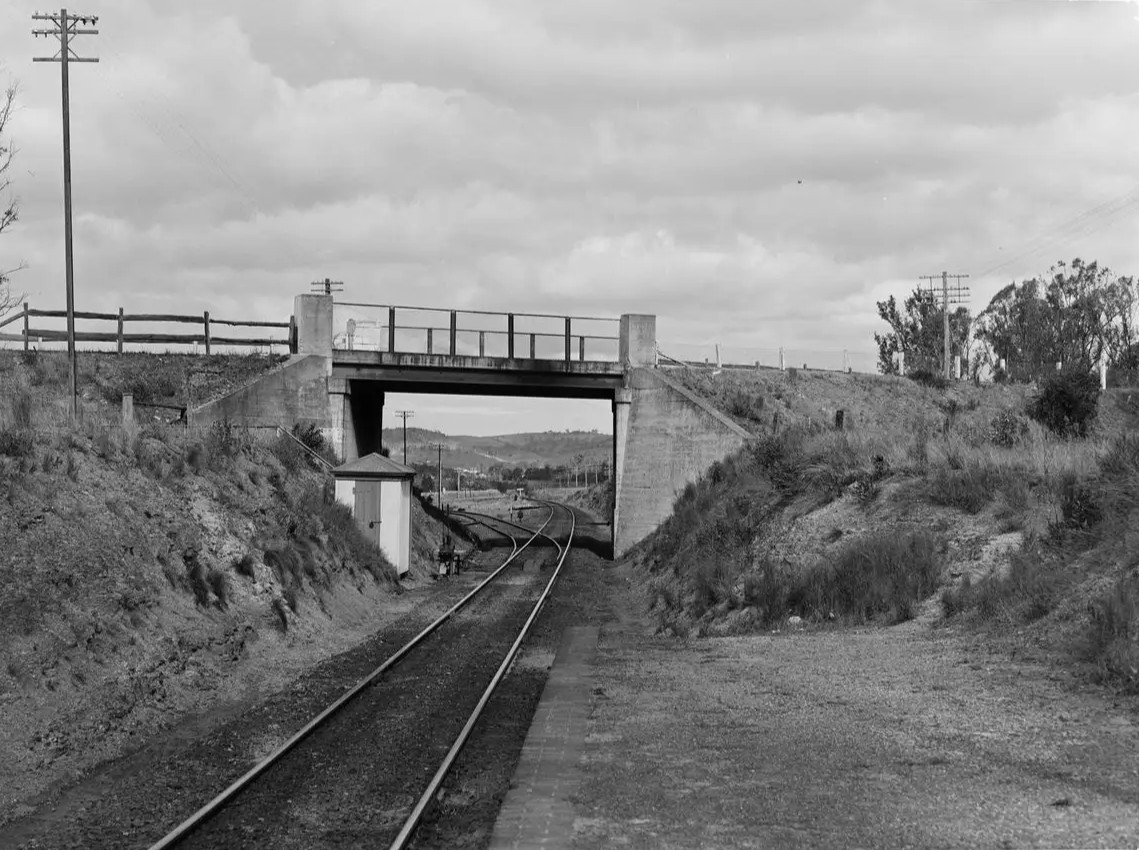
- Southbound view from the platform in September 1956

General information
- Location: Princes Highway, Yallah; New South Wales; Australia
- Coordinates: 34°32′12″S 150°47′06″E
- Owner: Illawarra Light Railway Museum
- Operator: Illawarra Light Railway Museum
- Line: South Coast
- Distance: 100.19 km (62.26 mi) from Central
- Platforms: 1 (1 side)
- Tracks: 1

Construction
- Structure type: Ground

Other information
- Status: Demolished

History
- Opened: 21 June 1887 (139 years ago)
- Closed: 19 October 1974 (51 years ago)
- Rebuilt: May 1890
- Former names: Marshall Mount (1887); Albion Park (1887–1888)

Services
Preceding station	Former services	Following station
Albion Park towards Bomaderry	South Coast Line	Dapto towards Sydney
Location

Yallah railway station was a regional railway station located on the South Coast line, serving the Wollongong suburb of Yallah. After closure, the station building was transferred to the Illawarra Light Railway Museum in Albion Park Rail.

== History ==
The contract for the construction of railway line from North Clifton to Yallah was let to Proudfoot & Logan on 20 October 1883, and covered around 42 kilometres (26 mi). The construction of railway line between Yallah and North Kiama was let to Monie & Co., which covered around 45.7 kilometres (28.4 mi) and was completed in 1885.

The first station to open on the site of Yallah was a temporary platform called Marshall Mount, opened on 21 June 1887. This platform was operated by a contractor, in order to provide a limited service for Queen Victoria's Golden Jubilee Day.

Yallah station was opened in 1887 as Albion Park, initially as a stopping place for trains but without a platform. The station was renamed Yallah in December 1888 in conjunction with the renaming of the nearby Oak Flats railway station. The physical station platform and building were opened in June 1890.

A siding serving the Tallawarra Power Station was constructed nearby, and branched from the South Coast line immediately south of the station.

The station closed to passenger services in 1974 and the platform was demolished. In 1976, the station building was bought by the Illawarra Light Railway Museum from the Public Transport Commission for $20 and on 8 May 1976, the building was transferred to the museum and restored to be used as the museum's main station building and booking office. The station building was once again restored in 2007.
