= Dapto railway station =

Railway station in New South Wales, Australia

Dapto
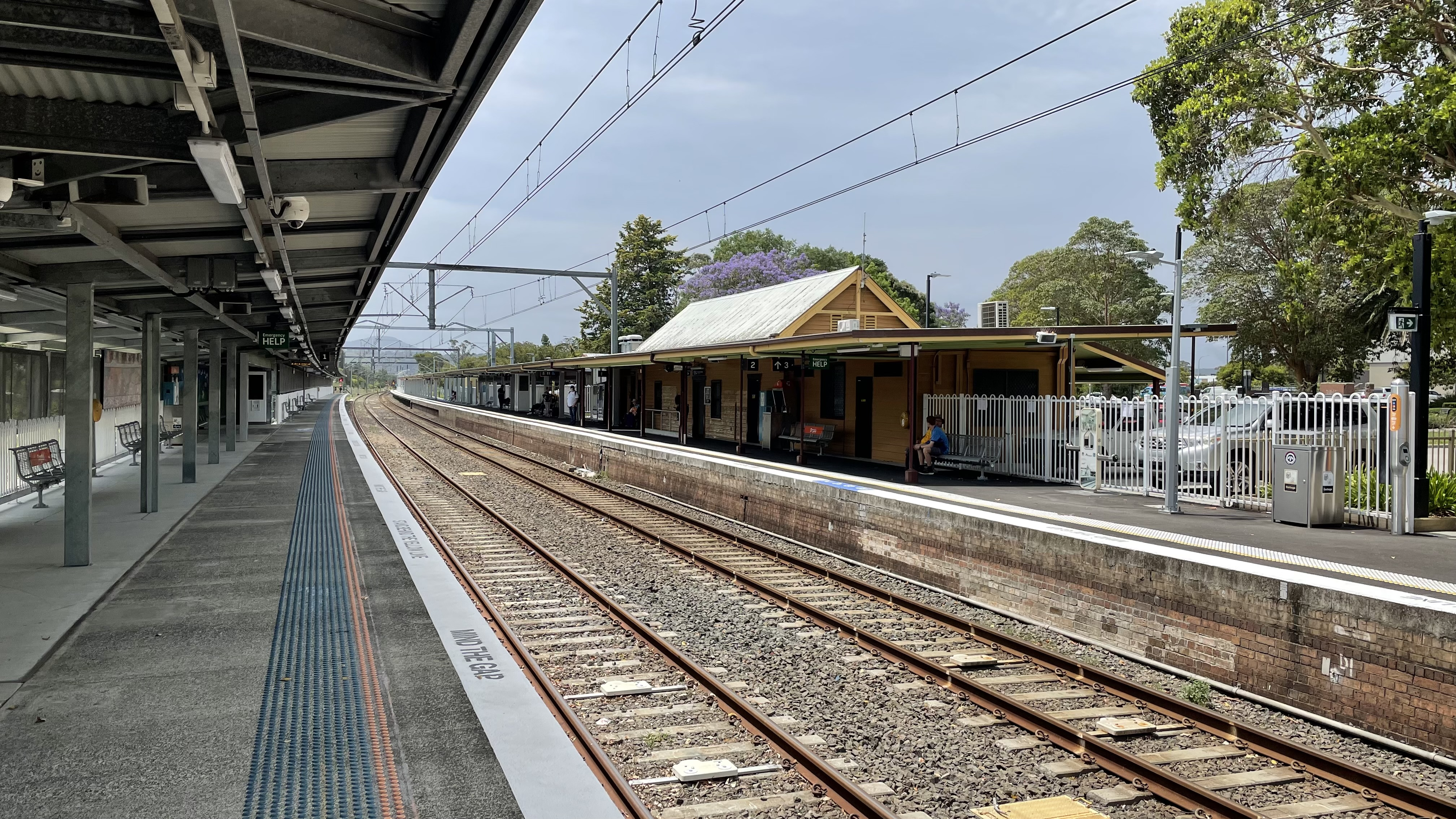
- Northbound view from Platform 1, November 2023

General information
- Location: Station Street, Dapto; New South Wales; Australia
- Coordinates: 34.4929°S 150.7918°E
- Elevation: 12 metres (39 ft)
- Owner: Transport Asset Manager of New South Wales
- Operator: Sydney Trains
- Line: South Coast
- Distance: 95.047 kilometres (59.059 mi) from Central
- Platforms: 1 (side), 199 metres (653 ft), built 1993; 2 (side), 329 metres (1,079 ft), built 1887; 3 (dock), 191 metres (627 ft), built 1993
- Train operators: Sydney Trains

Construction
- Structure type: At-grade
- Parking: Yes
- Cycle facilities: Bike racks
- Accessible: Yes
- Architectural style: Late Victorian

Other information
- Status: Staffed
- Website: Transport for NSW

History
- Opened: 9 January 1887
- Electrified: 24 January 1993

Passengers
- 2023: 241,750 (year); 662 (daily) (Sydney Trains, NSW TrainLink)

Services
Preceding station	Intercity Trains	Following station
Albion Park towards Kiama	South Coast Line	Kembla Grange Weekends and race days only towards Central or Bondi Junction
Albion Park towards Kiama	South Coast Line	Unanderra towards Central or Bondi Junction
Former services
Preceding station	Former services	Following station
Yallah towards Bomaderry	South Coast Line (1887–1974)	Kembla Grange towards Sydney
Location

Dapto railway station is a heritage-listed railway station located on the South Coast railway line in the Wollongong suburb of Dapto, New South Wales, Australia.

== History ==
The railway from Clifton to North Kiama, opened in 1887, continued through the sparsely-settled rural district of Dapto. Although the station was built some distance south of the existing village centre (that area, now called Brownsville, was considered too swampy) the platform building was significantly larger than any other south of Wollongong – of a scale usually reserved for medium-sized country towns. The commercial centre of Dapto duly migrated south to be nearer the station.

The approach to the platform building from Station Street is via a circular driveway through Hartigan Park, planted with brush box and Canary Island date palm. (Today, the park also contains Korean and Vietnam war memorials.)

Entry is via a gabled entry porch flanked by small verandahs. The building is made of weatherboard, with a complex, gabled roof clad in corrugated steel. The building was renovated in the 1920s and again in 1970. The original toilet block was replaced with the current blond-brick structure in 1971.

Dapto served as the interchange point between diesel multiple units to Bomaderry and electric multiple units to Wollongong and Sydney from 1993 until the Kiama electrification in 2001. To accommodate the interchange, a new platform 1 was built on the western side of the station, and a new dock platform (3) was added to the northern end of the main platform, which was renumbered platform 2. Access between platforms 1 and 2 is via the Bong Bong Road level crossing on the southern end of the platforms. Additional minor upgrades were completed in 2013 and 2014.

In 2014, electronic ticketing in the form of the Opal smart card became available at the station.

In 2014, the railway station was featured in the first episode of an online animated series called Damo and Darren where the two main characters argue over a lighter.

== Platforms and services ==
Dapto has two side platforms and one dock platform. It is serviced by Sydney Trains South Coast line services travelling between Sydney Central, Bondi Junction and Kiama.

Platform	Line	Stopping pattern	Notes
1	South Coast Line	services to Kiama, Sydney Central & Bondi Junction	
2	South Coast Line	services to Kiama, Sydney Central & Bondi Junction	
3	South Coast Line	terminating services to & from Sydney Central & Bondi Junction	dock platform

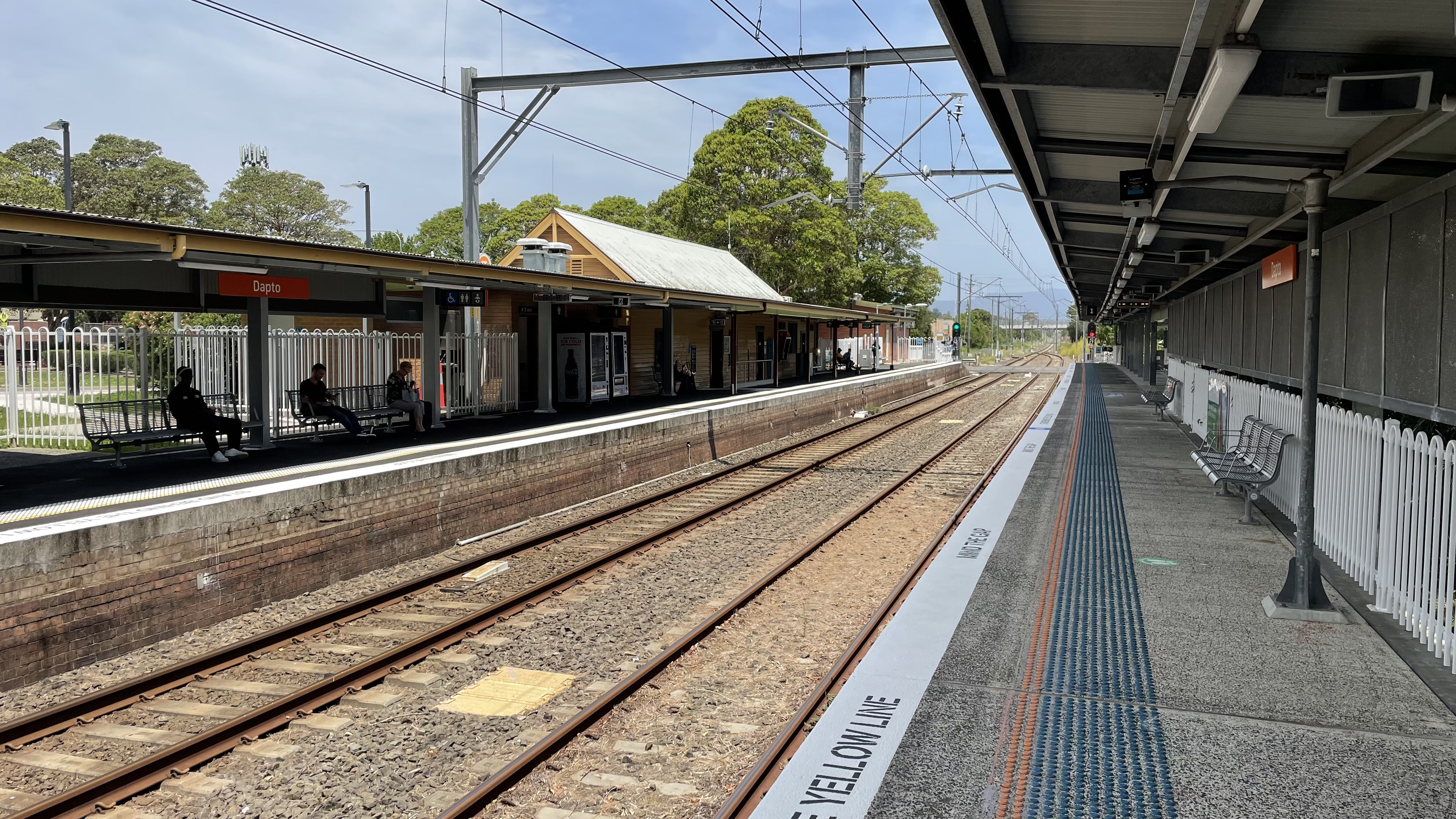
Southbound view from platform 1

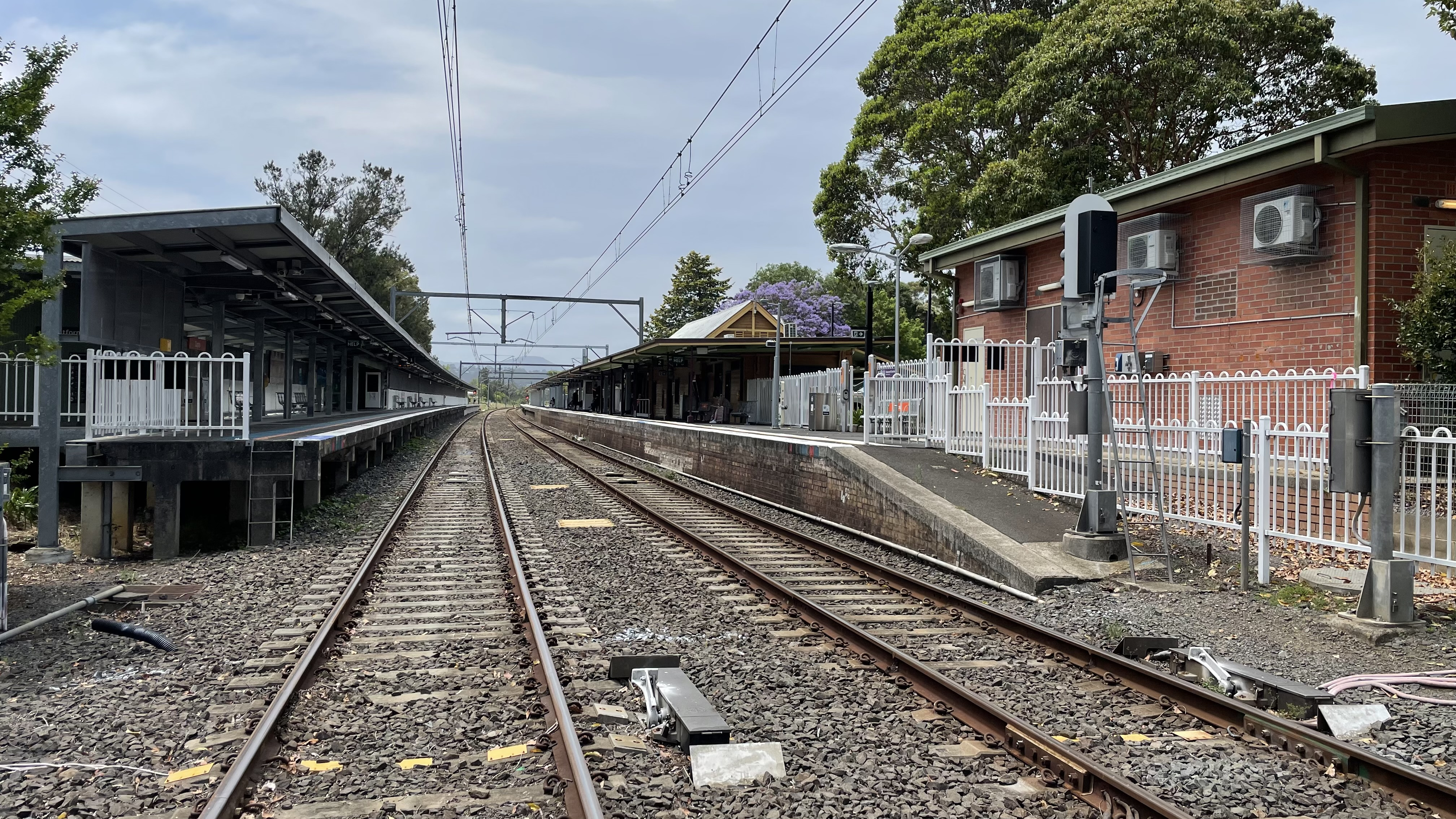
Station as viewed from Bong Bong Road railway crossing

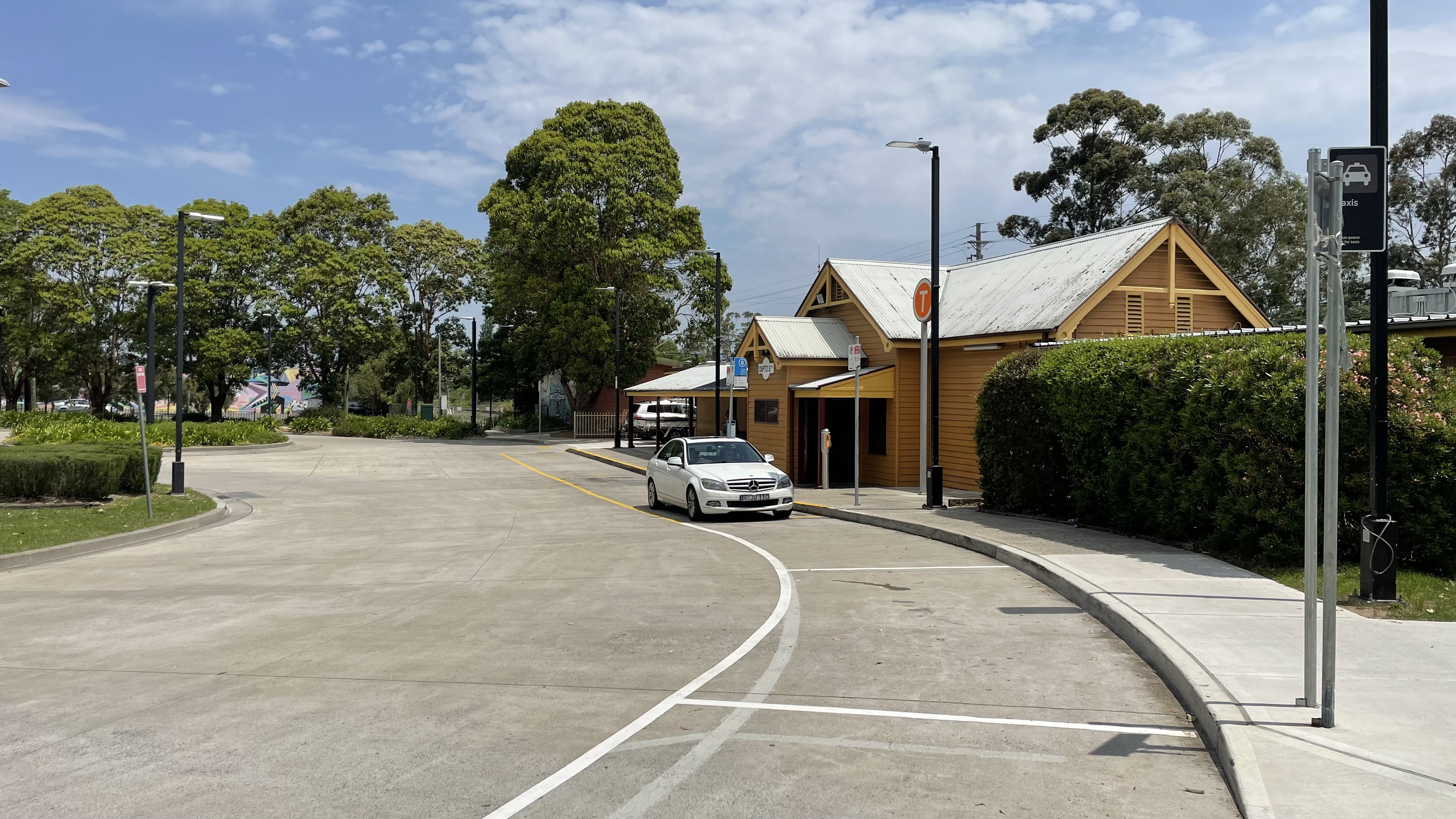
Interchange facilities

== Transport links ==
Premier Illawarra operates five bus routes via Dapto station, under contract to Transport for NSW:

- 31: Wollongong to Horsley
- 33: to Wollongong
- 37: Wollongong Beach to Wollongong station via Oak Flats & Shellharbour anti-clockwise loop
- 41: to University of Wollongong
- 57: Wollongong station to Wollongong Beach via Shellharbour & Oak Flats clockwise loop

Dapto is also served by one NSW TrainLink coach service between Wollongong and Bundanoon.
