= Gerringong railway station =

Railway station in New South Wales, Australia

Gerringong
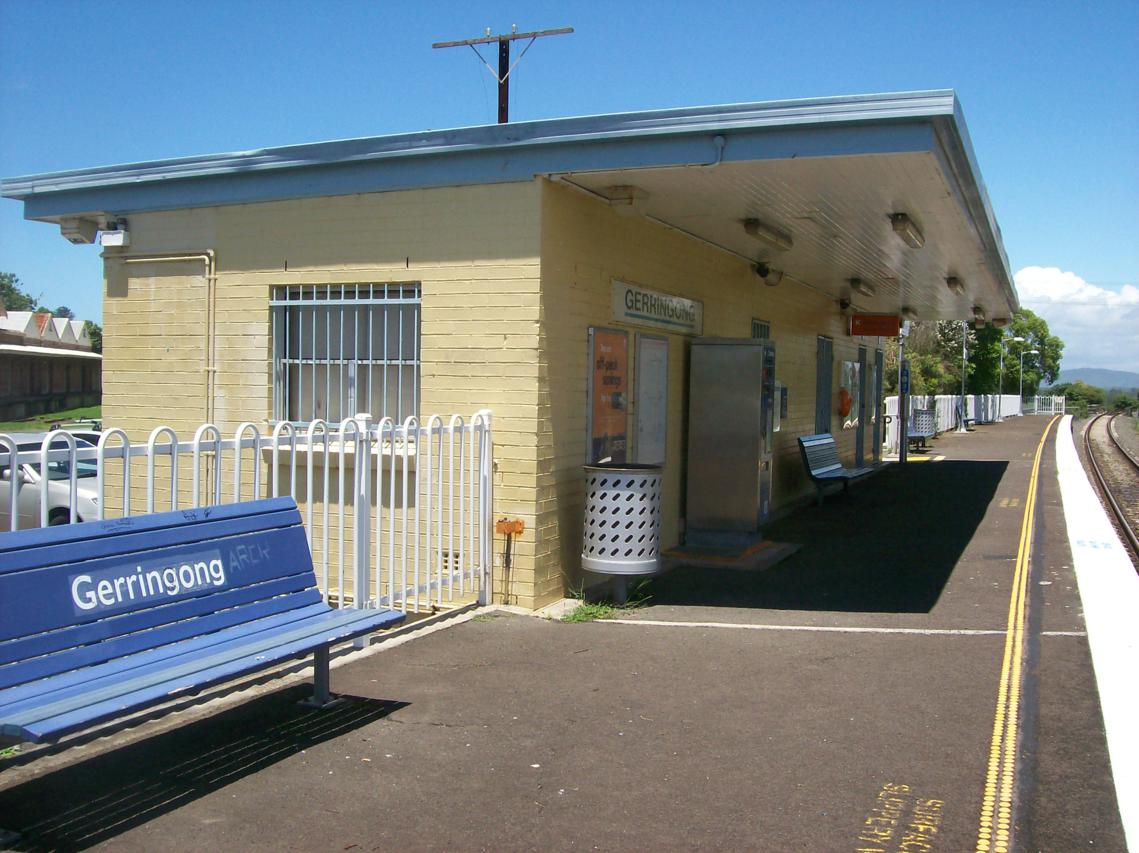
- South-west bound view from the station platform, December 2014

General information
- Location: Belinda Street, Gerringong; New South Wales; Australia
- Coordinates: 34.7451°S 150.8172°E
- Elevation: 21 metres (69 ft)
- Owner: Transport Asset Manager of New South Wales
- Operator: Sydney Trains
- Line: South Coast
- Distance: 128.560 kilometres (79.883 mi) from Central
- Platforms: 1, 80 metres
- Train operators: Sydney Trains

Construction
- Structure type: At-grade
- Parking: Yes
- Cycle facilities: Yes
- Accessible: Yes
- Architectural style: Inter-war functionalism

Other information
- Status: Weekdays: Staffed: 5.35am to 9.35am: Weekends and public holidays: Unstaffed
- Website: Transport for NSW

History
- Opened: 2 June 1893

Passengers
- 2025: 31514 (year); 86 (daily) (Sydney Trains, NSW TrainLink)

Services
Preceding station	Intercity Trains	Following station
Berry towards Bomaderry	South Coast Line Bomaderry Shuttle	Kiama Terminus
Former services
Preceding station	Former services	Following station
Toolijooa towards Bomaderry	South Coast Line (1893–1974)	Omega towards Sydney
Berry towards Bomaderry	South Coast Line (1974–1986)	Omega towards Sydney
Location

Gerringong railway station is a single-platform intercity railway station located in Gerringong, New South Wales, Australia, on the South Coast railway line. The station serves Sydney Trains diesel multiple unit trains travelling south to Bomaderry and north to Kiama. Early morning and late night services to the station are provided by train replacement bus services. In the past, the station precinct also catered to freight trains carrying dairy products.

== History ==
The NSW Government Railways opened its South Coast Line extension, from Bombo to Bomaderry, on 2 June 1893. The town was initially served by both the main Gerringong Station and a smaller, unstaffed stop called Omega, two kilometres to the north. The timing was fortuitous: the district's main link to Sydney, the jetty at Boat Harbour, had been destroyed in a storm two years previously. The arrival of the railway marked the end of coastal shipping to Gerringong after close to half a century of service.

The Gerringong district was home to a highly productive dairy industry. The opening of the railway dramatically improved local producers' access to the lucrative Sydney market, so the then Gerringong Co-Operative Dairy Society moved its operations to a site neighbouring the station in 1908. The factory's rail siding was extended in 1936.

On the night of 18 August 1941, lightning struck wiring leading to Gerringong's weatherboard station building, setting it alight. A report in the local Kiama Reporter says that 150 townsfolk gathered at the scene, and a firehose was run from the adjacent factory to fight the blaze, but the building was lost – only the brick chimney and an iron safe remained. "The train from Sydney ... was held up for about twenty minutes on account of the fire," the Reporter recorded. A new brick station building was built in its place in 1942 in the functionalist style; it remains on the site in modified form today.

Over time, freight declined in importance for the railway, and cost pressures led to the closure of low-patronage stations across the network. By 1986, the Omega railway station had closed, and in 1991 the dairy co-op abandoned its siding in favour of road transport.

== Operations ==
The South Coast Line south of Kiama is non-electrified single track. Since 2001, northbound trains from Gerringong terminate at Kiama, requiring passengers to change to electric multiple unit services to Wollongong and Sydney. In 2005, then Minister for Transport John Watkins announced that electrification would be extended to the terminus at Bomaderry at an unspecified future date, but the proposal did not progress.

Gerringong Station was upgraded to be wheelchair-accessible in 2012. In 2014, electronic ticketing in the form of the Opal smart card became available at the station.

== Platforms and services ==
Gerringong has one platform. It is serviced by Sydney Trains South Coast line services travelling between Kiama and Bomaderry.

Platform	Line	Stopping pattern	Notes
1	South Coast Line	Services to Kiama & Bomaderry (Nowra)	
