= Kembla Grange railway station =

Railway station in New South Wales, Australia

Kembla Grange
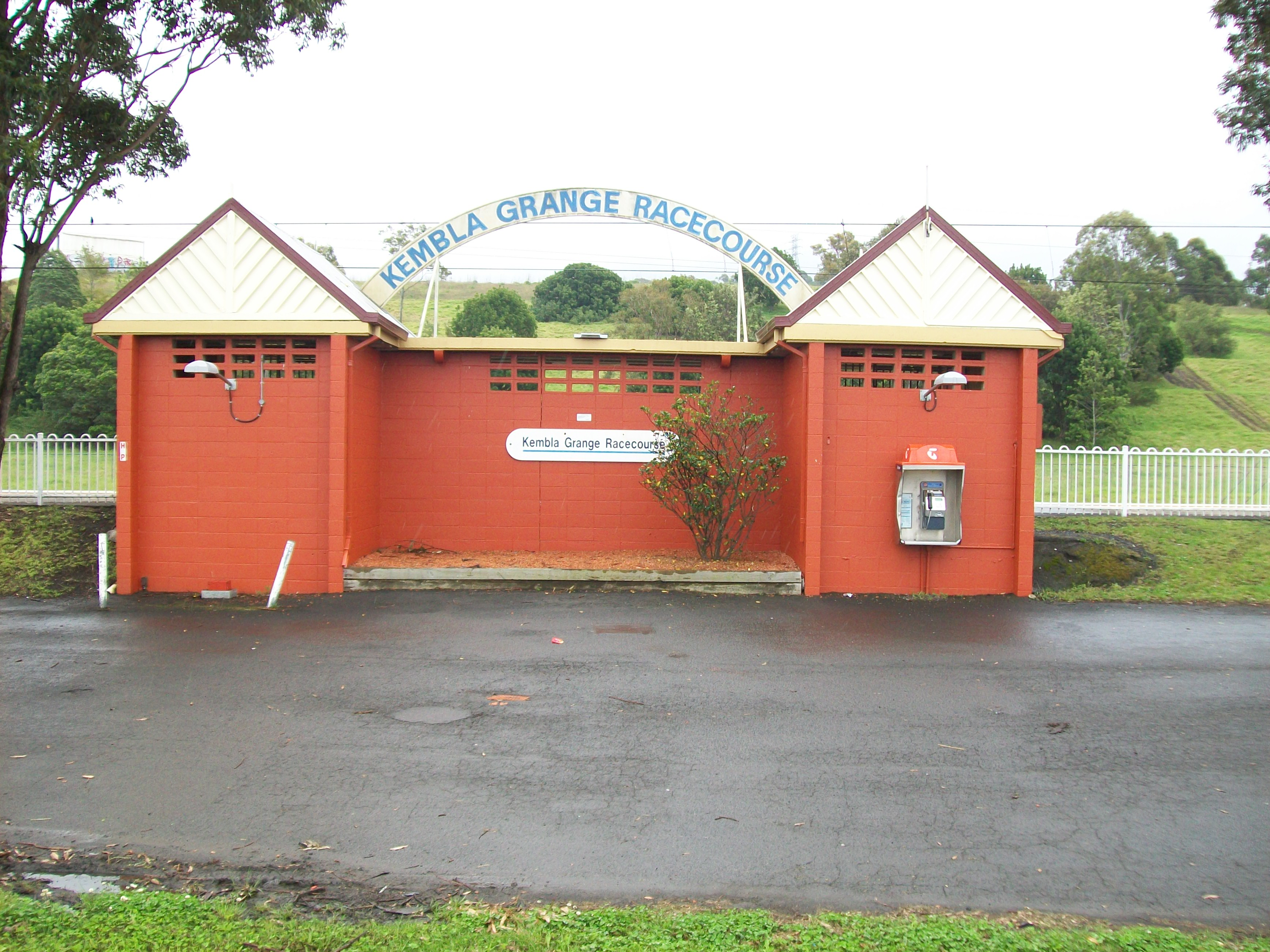
- Station building to the platforms, October 2011

General information
- Location: West Dapto Road, Kembla Grange; New South Wales; Australia
- Coordinates: 34.4699°S 150.8180°E
- Elevation: 9 metres (30 ft)
- Owner: Transport Asset Manager of New South Wales
- Line: South Coast
- Distance: 91.586 kilometres (56.909 mi) from Central
- Platforms: 1 (119 metres)
- Train operators: Sydney Trains

Construction
- Structure type: At-grade
- Parking: Yes
- Accessible: Yes

Other information
- Website: Transport for NSW

History
- Opened: 1 January 1890
- Electrified: 24 January 1993
- Former names: Kembla Grange Racecourse

Passengers
- 2023: 4,360 (year); 12 (daily) (Sydney Trains, NSW TrainLink)

Services
Preceding station	Intercity Trains	Following station
Dapto towards Kiama	South Coast Line Weekends and race days only	Unanderra towards Central or Bondi Junction
Location

Kembla Grange railway station is a heritage-listed railway station located in Kembla Grange, New South Wales, Australia, on the South Coast railway line. The station serves Sydney Trains travelling south to Kiama and north to Wollongong and Sydney. The station ranked equal last for patronage on the metropolitan network in 2012, and was one of 23 on the metropolitan rail network to record an average of fewer than one passenger per day in 2014.

== History ==
The railway through Kembla Grange was built as part of a South Coast Line extension from Wollongong to Bombo and opened in November 1887. Three years later, Kembla Grange Station was opened to serve the Kembla Grange Racecourse across the road. Kembla Grange is only open on Saturdays, Sundays and other race days. When open, the station operates as an on-request stop. A special siding and loading bank for horses operated at the station between 1912 and 1942.

The small breeze block waiting shed features a decorative gabled roof, and nameboard designed to suggest a racecourse winning post. The building was installed around the time the racecourse was redeveloped by the Department of Sport & Recreation in 1987.

Electrification reached Kembla Grange in 1993 and electronic ticketing, in the form of the Opal smartcard system, arrived in 2014.

== Accidents and incidents ==
=== 2021 derailment ===
On 20 October 2021, a Bondi Junction bound SCO service from Kiama consisting of Tangara set T42 collided with an abandoned van on a level crossing. Four of the eight passengers on board were injured, with the driver being trapped among the wreckage. The van was being used to steal a go-kart from Wollongong Kart Raceway when it got stuck on the tracks, and the driver and two passersby were unable to move it off the tracks before the collision.

== Platforms and services ==
Kembla Grange has one side platform, long enough for four carriages. It is serviced by Sydney Trains South Coast line services travelling between Sydney Central, Bondi Junction and Kiama.

Platform	Line	Stopping pattern	Notes
1	South Coast Line	services to Sydney Central, Bondi Junction & Kiama	request stop weekends & racedays only
