= Kembla Grange derailment =

2021 train derailment

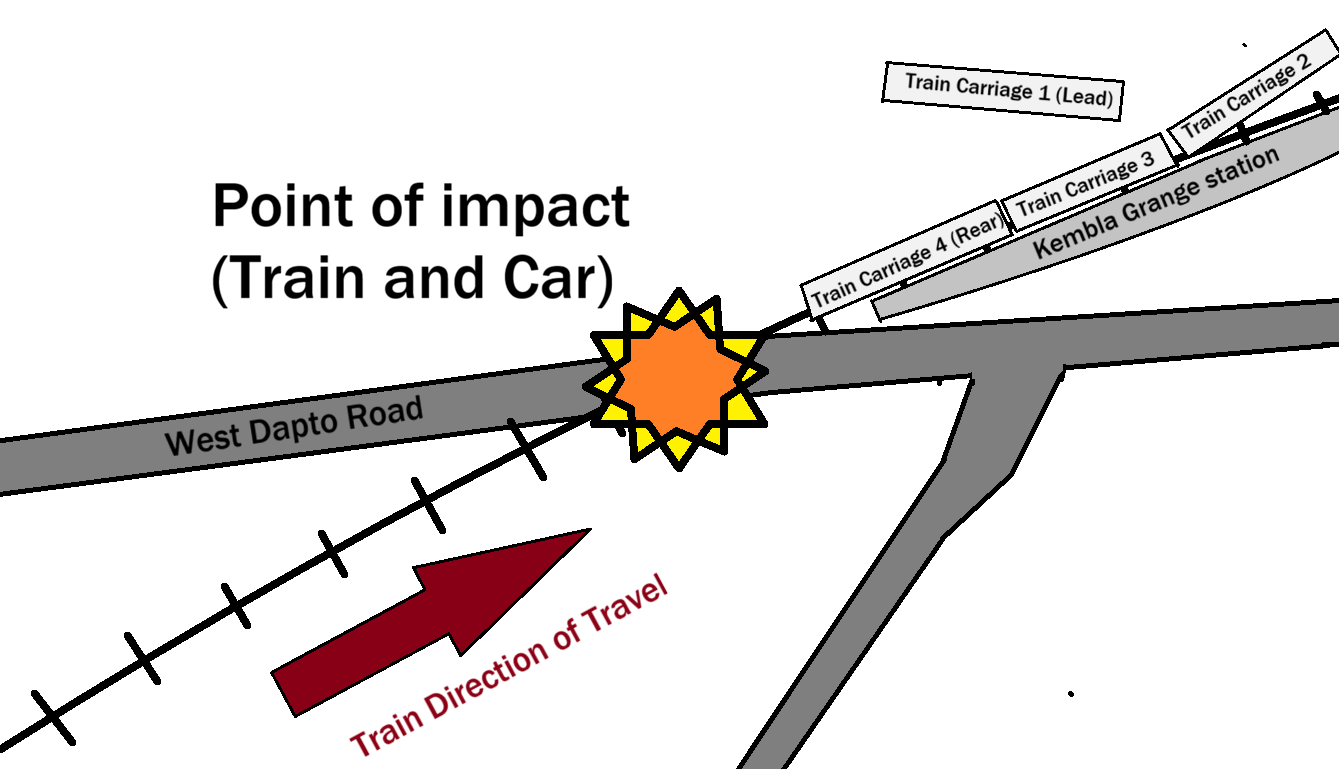
- Diagram depicting the derailment The site of the crash pictured several hours after the derailment.

Details
- Date: 20 October 2021; 4:10 AM (AEDT)
- Location: Kembla Grange, New South Wales
- Coordinates: 34°28′14.0″S 150°48′58.7″E
- Country: Australia
- Line: South Coast
- Operator: NSW TrainLink
- Service: Kiama to Bondi Junction
- Incident type: Collision and derailment
- Cause: Collision with and derailment by a motor vehicle abandoned on track

Statistics
- Trains: 1
- Vehicles: 1
- Passengers: 10
- Crew: 2
- Deaths: 0
- Injured: 4

At 4:10 AM AEDT on 20 October 2021, near Kembla Grange railway station, New South Wales, Australia, a Tangara T set running intercity services on the South Coast Line derailed and jackknifed after it collided with a van that was stuck on the railway tracks.

Between approximately 3:26 and 4:05 am (AEDT), Allan Simpson drove a Nissan van along the train tracks 50–68 metres south-west of the level crossing at West Dapto Road, adjacent to Kembla Grange railway station. When it became stuck on the rails, Simpson exited the vehicle and sought assistance from passers-by to push it off the tracks.

A northbound NSW TrainLink Tangara train, set T42, bound for Bondi Junction approached the site at 4:09 am.

== Incident ==
Just prior to 4:10 am, the Tangara collided with the van while slowing down from approximately 90 kilometres per hour (56 mph), derailing its first carriage. Travelling another 125 metres with its wheels off the tracks, the front carriage hit an electrical stanchion and jackknifed. Uncoupling from the rest of the train, it fell to an embankment left of the train tracks, landing on its right side. The second carriage derailed but stayed upright, while the third and fourth carriages stayed on the track.

The train driver was trapped inside the driver's compartment, sustaining an L1 compression fracture of the spine, a collapsed lung, and bruising to the hips, leg, back, and a rib. In addition to the driver, there were three passengers travelling in the first carriage when it fell.

Two passengers were injured: one reported pain in the upper chest, and another suffered an L2 compression fracture of the spine.

== Post-incident ==
=== Emergency response ===
The first 000 call was made around 4:05 am, alerting police to the presence of the van on the tracks. Police were unable to warn the driver in time but arrived within minutes of the collision. The fire brigade received a call for assistance just after 4:15 am.

Rescue crews were required to free the train driver from the driver's compartment.

The train driver and two of the ten passengers on board were admitted to Wollongong Hospital. The train guard also attended Wollongong Hospital for observation.

=== Media coverage ===
Initial media reports indicated that the van was stolen and relayed Police concerns that it may have been deliberately left on the tracks to incur damage.

=== Court proceedings ===
Simpson was arrested, charged with five offences, and refused bail on 27 October 2021.In the District Court of New South Wales he pled guilty to:

- drive while disqualified
- convicted offender enter land with intent to commit a serious indictable offence
- larceny
- endanger safety of person on railway
- cause obstruction to railway locomotive

and was sentenced to 4 years and 6 months imprisonment, with a non-parole period of 2 years and 6 months.

It is explained in the court judgement that the enter land and larceny charges relate to the events leading up to the derailment. Simpson cut through the fence of the nearby Wollongong Kart Raceway and stole a go-kart, wheeling it to a place adjacent to the train tracks. He had driven his partner's van with the intention of carrying the go-kart, and it was while moving the van to retrieve the go-kart that the van became stuck.

=== Incident investigation ===
The Office of Transport Safety Investigations in New South Wales conducted the incident investigation on behalf of the Australian Transport Safety Bureau.

=== Further transport-related incidents ===
Three years later on 25 July 2025, the same offender led police on a high speed chase through the nearby suburb of Unanderra. Simpson was driving a stolen blue Porsche when he smashed into a Mustang in Unanderra Industrial Park. He was arrested at the scene of the accident.
