= Berry railway station =

Railway station in New South Wales, Australia

Berry
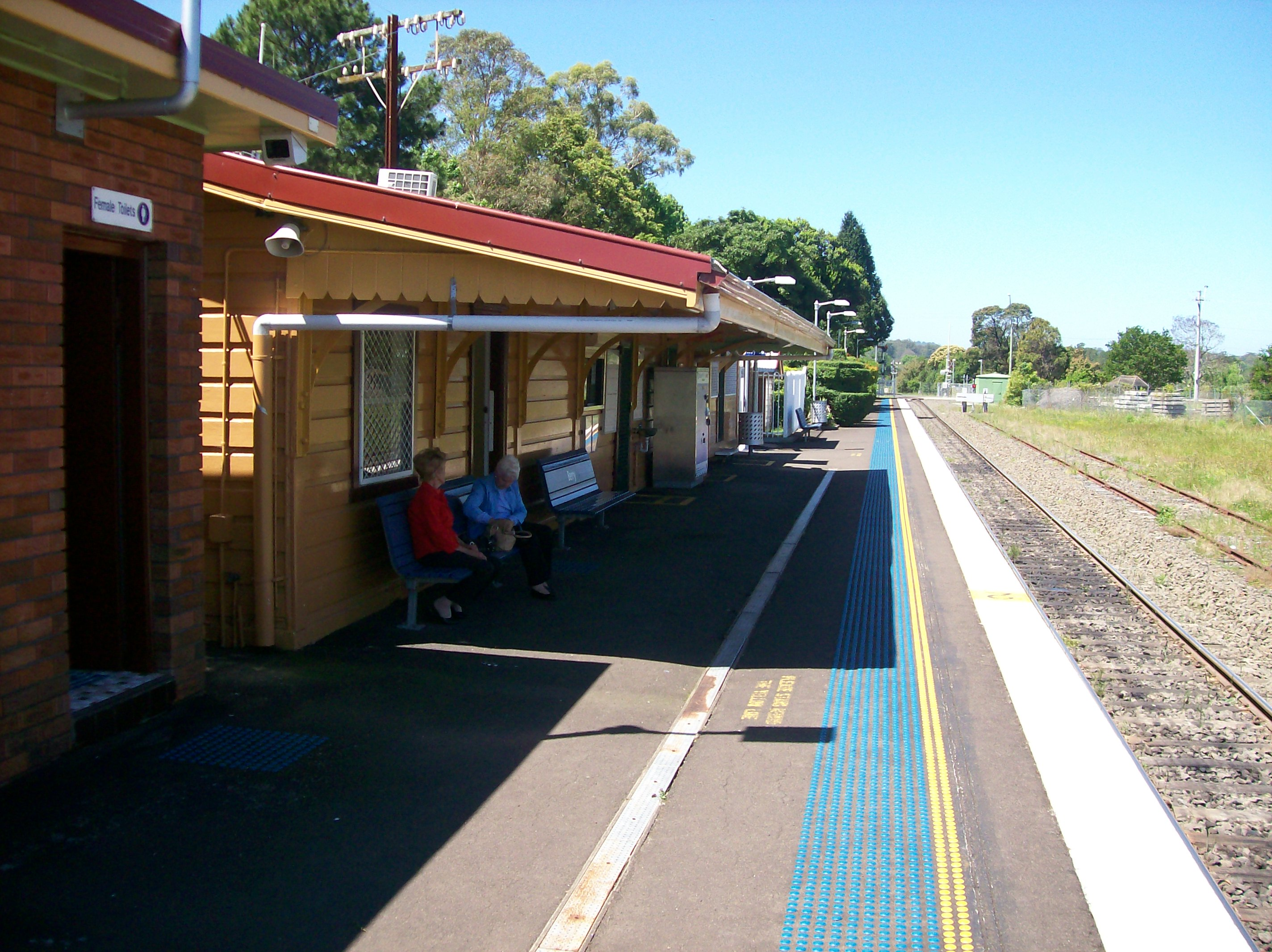
- Berry station in January 2006

General information
- Location: Station Road, Berry; New South Wales; Australia
- Coordinates: 34.7805°S 150.6964°E
- Elevation: 11 metres (36 ft)
- Owner: Transport Asset Manager of New South Wales
- Operator: Sydney Trains
- Line: South Coast
- Distance: 140.8 kilometres (87.5 mi) from Central
- Platforms: 1, 113 metres
- Train operators: Sydney Trains

Construction
- Structure type: Elevated platform
- Parking: Yes
- Cycle facilities: Yes
- Accessible: Yes

Other information
- Status: Weekdays: Staffed: 5am to 9pm: Weekends and public holidays: Staffed: 5am to 9pm
- Website: Transport for NSW

History
- Opened: 2 June 1893

Passengers
- 2025: 37,200 (year); 102 (daily) (Sydney Trains, NSW TrainLink)

Services
Preceding station	Intercity Trains	Following station
Bomaderry Terminus	South Coast Line Bomaderry Shuttle	Gerringong towards Kiama
Location

Berry railway station is a heritage-listed single-platform intercity train station located in Berry, New South Wales, Australia, on the South Coast railway line. The station serves Sydney Trains diesel multiple unit trains travelling south to Bomaderry and north to Kiama. Early morning and late night services to the station are provided by train replacement bus services. In the past, the station precinct also catered to freight trains carrying cattle and dairy products.

It was added to the New South Wales State Heritage Register on 2 April 1999.

== History ==
The NSW Government Railways opened its South Coast Line extension, from Bombo to Bomaderry, on 2 June 1893. Berry Station was built to serve what was at the time the largest town on the alignment, and opened as part of this extension. The station, constructed by the firm of G. J. Featherstone & T. J. Barbel, included a passing loop, stationmaster's cottage, platform, waiting shed and goods shed. The main platform building contained a ticket office, general waiting room, 'ladies' room' and toilet. The buildings were constructed from weatherboard with corrugated steel roofs. Though the original plans called for a second platform and waiting shed, these did not eventuate.

1907 plans show the station with the following structures: on the east side of the railway tracks (south to north): Berry Central Butter Factory, engine boiler house, goods shed, and a Fettler's cottage near the level crossing; west side (south to north): cattle yards, Fettler's cottage, levers, platform with horse dock at southern end, platform building, Station Master's residence with a fern house attached to the south-western corner, and a further Fettler's cottage to the west of the level crossing.

The station precinct grew to include the Berry Central Butter Factory, cattle yards, and a number of residences for railway workers. A signal box was added in 1912. In 1912 the goods siding was extended to serve the Berry Central Butter Factory, it being also extended in 1913 to send milk to the Sydney markets. A brick toilet block was added in 1979. Of the former goods yard, today only a small up siding opposite the station and a small down siding to the west remain. With most of its 1893 buildings intact as of 2009, Berry Station is considered state-significant heritage by the Office of Environment & Heritage. As the buildings pre-date the standardisation of railway buildings such as cottages, they are relatively rare examples of their type.

Plans annotated in the 1960s note the shortening of the goods stage attached to the south of the goods shed in 1960 and the construction of a ramp to the goods shed and demolition of the cattle yards (by this stage marked as "trucking yards") in 1968.

Plans dated 22 April 1974 show a proposed gang shed and proposed migratory gang camp amenity building on the former site of the cattle yards and fettlers cottage south of the station (west side). These plans also show toilet upgrades to the platform building and the demolition of a separate gents toilet building, the former Station Master's residence being leased to the Boy Scouts, and the former Fettler's house to the west of the level crossing also being leased for private rental accommodation.

Two other stations in the district, Jaspers Brush to the south and Toolijooa to the north, opened at the same time, but were closed in 1974 as part of a network-wide rationalisation of low-patronage stations.

The Berry Station Master's residence is now disused (2009) but its immediate past use was as a Scout Hall. It is presumably during this period of use as a Scout Hall that most of the internal walls to the front main gable roofed section of the residence were removed.

== Operations ==
The South Coast Line south of Kiama is non-electrified single track. Since 2001, most northbound trains from Berry have terminated at Kiama, requiring passengers to change to electric multiple unit services to Wollongong and Sydney. In 2005, then Minister for Transport John Watkins announced that electrification would be extended to the terminus at Bomaderry at an unspecified future date, but the proposal did not progress.

Berry and Bomaderry were the last locations in the NSW metropolitan rail network to use the electric staff signalling system. The system, installed in 1908, was replaced with automated signalling in 2014. The same year, electronic ticketing in the form of the Opal smart card became available at Berry.

== Platforms and services ==
Platform	Line	Stopping pattern	Notes
1	South Coast Line	Services to Kiama & Bomaderry (Nowra)	

== Description ==
The heritage-listed station precinct includes the station master's residence (1893), platform building (1893, awning added in 1901), platform garden beds and topiary shrubs, signal box (1912), lamp room (1893), out of room aka parcels office (1893), produce shed (c. 1940s), goods shed (1893, 1960), platform (1893) and the 1923 waiting room and ticket office signs attached to the platform 1 building.

Berry Railway Station is located on Station Road opposite and south of David Berry Park and Memorial Park, and the intersection with Alexandra Street (which leads north onto the Princes Highway). There is a station car park located to the north of the railway station platform. Perimeter fencing for the station is modern powdercoated white aluminium fencing. The Station Master's residence is located northeast of the station platform building, east of the car park.

The railway station is in a picturesque setting with the Illawarra escarpment visible beyond the station buildings, and the single platform and platform buildings are oriented facing south, with the exception of the Out-of-room, which has a door to the north opening into the station car park. The buildings on the platform generally string along the platform east–west. From east to west the buildings are ranged as follows: lamp room; Out-of-room; signal box; platform building; 1979 brick toilet block. The goods and per way sheds are located at the western end of the station, on the southern side of the railway lines.

Station Master's Residence (1893)

The 1893 Berry Station Master's residence is a relatively early example of the J2 type Station Master's residence design, having been constructed prior to the 1899 issue of the series of standard plans for these buildings. It is also one of a number of railway residences built at Berry, including a gatekeeper's house at 66 Prince Alfred St. (The other railway residences at Berry are now in private ownership).

The "J2" design is a standard type residence dating from 1885 to 1920, usually of timber or brick with a high gabled roof with rafters extending to form a veranda across the front of the building, and two chimneys. The buildings featured a simple symmetrical façade with central four-panel front door, front room windows to either side and a rear skillion service wing. While the overall form remained similar to J1 it was 4 ft wider, and provided larger rooms. Plans dated 1903 show new rear extensions to the Station Master's residence.

The residence is located on an unfenced site with a number of large trees, both native and exotic, with the front facade facing west into the Berry Railway Station car park. A straight concrete path leads to the centre of the front veranda from the station car park. This is a freestanding single storey weatherboard residence on brick piers with a gabled corrugated steel roof, a skillion corrugated steel roofed veranda across the width of the front of the house. The veranda is carried on 4 timber posts (corner post at southeast corner damaged) and has a timber floor. The residence has a rear section with two skillion roofs and a gable roofed rear wing to the north-eastern corner of the house, all roofed in corrugated steel. Part of a rear skillion roofed veranda is extant. The front facade is symmetrical, with a central 4 panel front door (now covered over on the exterior) flanked by timber famed double hung windows, each sash having a single vertical glazing bar. The residence originally had 2 brick chimneys at the apex of the gabled roof, however only the southern of these is extant (note roof is patched in the former location of the northern chimney). There is a simple brick chimney near the north-eastern corner of the building to service the kitchen, where a hearth is extant. Part of the rear sections have fibro asbestos walls. Windows are generally timber framed double hung with vertical glazing bars to sashes. The front and back doors are timber 4-panel doors with fanlights. These doors are blocked up on the outside.

Internally, walls have been largely removed, leaving only 2 rooms in the main section of the house. There are timber floors and tongue & grooved timber ceilings.

Platform Building (1893)

The platform building is a long rectangular weatherboard building with a concrete base and a corrugated steel skillion roof sloping towards the rail lines, with the awning supported on cantilevered timber roof beams braced with curved metal braces. All of the rooms open onto the platform with no interconnection between rooms. The building contains a waiting room, station masters office and staff instruments room. The building has aluminium framed double hung windows, with one extant timber framed double hung window frame (in the waiting room); security screen doors and security screens to windows. There are steel brackets to the platform building awning, which faces south, timber beams and a timber valance to the east and west ends of the awning. There are no chimneys to the roof, however there is an extant chimney breast to the waiting room. There is an air-conditioning unit on the roof.

The internal layout of the platform building appears to be relatively intact. There are timber tongue & grooved internal wall linings and ceilings, except in the waiting room. There are operable metal vents to the interior near the top of walls. The waiting room has modern floor tiling and fibre cement sheeting to walls and ceilings, and 2 modern aluminium framed windows, one within an original timber window frame. There are "staff instruments" still operating in the room at the eastern end of the platform building. This room has timber tongue & grooved ceiling and walls. The fog signalman's equipment is also located in this room.

Platform Garden Beds and Topiary Shrubs

The topiary shrubs and garden beds form part of the station platform's setting and character. While railway gardens were once fairly common, surviving such elements are becoming rare today.

Signal Box (1912)

The signal box is a small weatherboard building located directly next to the platform building and is raised on a concrete base, the base being attached to the platform building. The signal box has a corrugated Colorbond skillion roof. Originally this building had no wall on the platform side, however a wall with windows and central doorway has been added.

The original signal lever frame remains within the signal box.

Out of Shed (1893)

This is a small weatherboard skillion roofed structure, located east of the signal box, with entrances to both platform and car park behind. It has a solid timber tongue & grooved board sliding doors to the centre of the north and south elevations.

Interior: The out of shed has a concrete floor and no wall linings.

Lamp room

The lamp room is a diminutive gable roofed building with a corrugated steel roof, and a central timber tongue & grooved board door on the north elevation facing the car park.

Internally, the floor is concrete, and there are no ceilings or wall linings. There is timber shelving installed to the interior of the east wall.

Goods Shed (1893)

This is a corrugated iron side shed 36 ft × 16 ft with a small timber platform along the rail side and a wider platform at the northern end with sliding timber doors to both road and rail sides. The building is in intact condition however the tracks have recently been removed in changes to the yard layout.

Produce Shed (c. 1940s)

This is a large corrugated steel shed with a gabled corrugated steel roof located west of the goods shed. Noted on c. 1974 plans as being leased by Berry Rural Co-op Society.

Platform (1893)

The platform face is brick with brick copings and indicates the extension of the platform in 1915 to accommodate longer trains. The centre of the platform has been capped with concrete to raise the height.

Landscape/Natural Features

There are significant plantings on the platform, between the station platform buildings, including topiary shrubs. The Shoalhaven LEP 1985 (as amended) lists - as part of Schedule 7: Heritage Items: the Berry Railway Station Group - the following plantings: Ilex cornuta (Chinese Holly) and Gardenia thunbergia (Gardenia). In addition, the site of the Station Master's residence contains a number of large mature trees, both native and exotic.

Moveable items

Signals (in signal box); staff instruments (in room at east end of platform building); fog signalman's equipment (in room at east end of platform building); timber trolley (in Out-of-room); timber indicator board (located between the signal box and the Out-of-room).

As at 4 September 2013, the platform building, signal box, out of room, per way shed, goods shed and platform were in good condition, the lamp room was in moderate condition, the station master's residence was in poor to very poor condition, and the moveable items were in good to very good condition.

Various structures such as the timber loading stage, perway shed and cattle yards are no longer extant at Berry, however the core group of 1893 platform buildings, goods shed and Station Master's residence are extant, along with an extensive range of early moveable items which remain in context and a c. 1940s produce shed. While interior fitout to the platform building has altered over time, much of the original fabric is extant. The interior of the Station Master's residence has been extensively altered (most internal walls removed), however it is externally relatively intact, though in poor condition. The signal box is of moderate to high integrity, retaining its signalling equipment and associated items in situ, though has undergone some modifications to its external appearance on the rail side.

=== Modifications and dates ===
- 1901: awning added to the originally awningless platform building
- 1903: between 1901 and 1903 a butter factory was constructed east of the rail lines, and new rear extensions constructed to the Station Master's residence
- 1907: fernery (no longer extant) built to south-western corner of Station Master's residence
- 1912: Goods siding constructed to serve the Berry Central Butter Factory; signal box constructed.
- 1913: Goods siding to Butter Factory extended
- c. 1915: Platform lengthened c. 1915 for racecourse traffic
- c. 1940: Produce shed constructed
- 1960: shortening of goods stage and construction of ramp to goods shed
- 1974: internal alterations to platform building
- c. 1974: internal alterations to Station Master's residence (removal of most internal walls)
- 1979: new brick toilet block
- 1983: internal alterations to platform building
- c. 1980s: most internal walls removed from main front gable roofed section of Station Master's residence
- unknown date: Per way shed demolished

== Heritage listing ==
Berry Railway Station is of State historical significance as an important country railway station complex built from 1893 to the 1940s, with most of its original 1893 elements intact, including platform buildings, early equipment and the original station masters residence, and for its relationship to the development of the town of Berry.

The Berry Railway Station is of State aesthetic significance as a rare group of simple early weatherboard station buildings including goods shed and Station Master's residence, with later corrugated steel produce shed, located in a picturesque location within the historic Berry township, with the Illawarra escarpment visible beyond. The small weatherboard Out-of-room, signal box and lamp room are typical of small sheds built extensively for these purposes throughout the state. The Station Master's residence is a representative, now rare, early example of a railway residence, which predates the standard railway residence designs of 1899. The Berry Railway Station group is of technical and research significance for its early moveable items including staff instruments, signals, fog signalman's equipment, early timber trolley and timber indicator board.

Berry railway station was listed on the New South Wales State Heritage Register on 2 April 1999 having satisfied the following criteria.

The place is important in demonstrating the course, or pattern, of cultural or natural history in New South Wales.

Berry Railway Station is of State historical significance as an important country railway station group built from 1893 to 1912, with most of its original elements intact, including early equipment and the original Station Master's residence, and for its relationship to the development of the town of Berry. The Berry Station Master's residence is of historical significance as one of a number of railway residences constructed at Berry which evidence late 19th century railway operational arrangements to accommodate staff on site, and as an early design residence, constructed prior to the issue of a series of standard plans for railway residences in 1899.

The place has a strong or special association with a person, or group of persons, of importance of cultural or natural history of New South Wales's history.

The Berry Station Master's residence design has historical association with Henry Deane, Engineer in Chief for Railways Construction 1891–1901.

The place is important in demonstrating aesthetic characteristics and/or a high degree of creative or technical achievement in New South Wales.

Berry Railway Station is of State aesthetic significance as a rare group of simple early weatherboard station buildings with later corrugated steel goods and produce sheds, located in a picturesque location within the historic Berry township, with the Illawarra escarpment visible beyond. The small weatherboard Out-of-room, signal box and lamp room are typical of small sheds built extensively for these purposes throughout the state. The Berry Station Master's residence is of aesthetic significance as a small vernacular Victorian Georgian style dwelling, purpose-built for accommodation of railway staff.

The place has strong or special association with a particular community or cultural group in New South Wales for social, cultural or spiritual reasons.

The place has the potential to contribute to the local community's sense of place, and can provide a connection to the local community's past.

The place has potential to yield information that will contribute to an understanding of the cultural or natural history of New South Wales.

Berry Railway Station is of research significance for its early moveable items including staff instruments, signals, fog signalman's equipment, and timber indicator board.

The place possesses uncommon, rare or endangered aspects of the cultural or natural history of New South Wales.

This item is assessed as historically rare. This item is assessed as arch. rare. This item is assessed as socially rare.

The place is important in demonstrating the principal characteristics of a class of cultural or natural places/environments in New South Wales.

The Berry Station Master's residence is a representative example of an early design railway residence, which predates the standard designs of 1899. The small weatherboard Out-of-room, signal box and lamp room are typical of small sheds built extensively for these purposes throughout the state.
