= Kiama railway station =

Railway station in New South Wales, Australia

Kiama
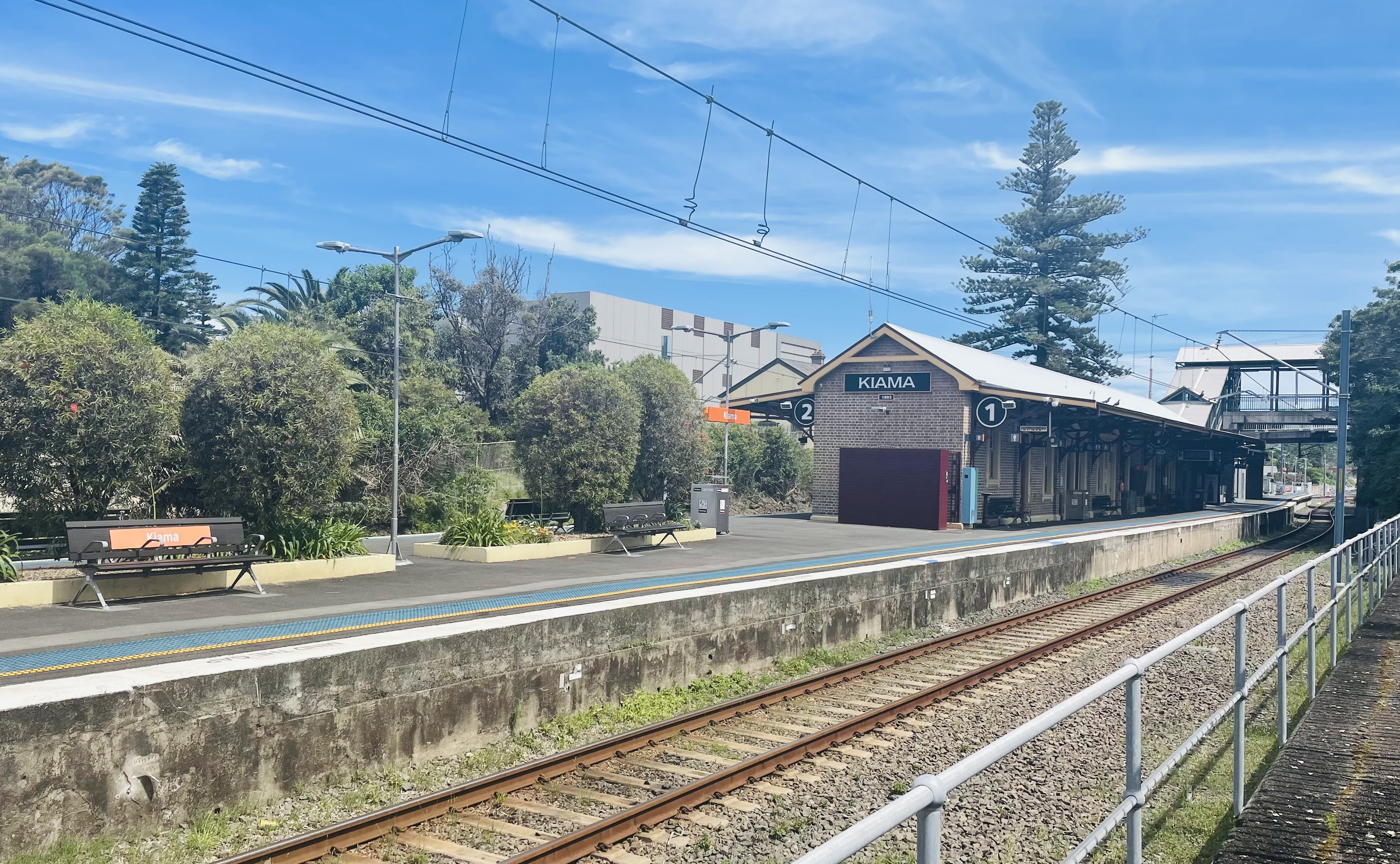
- Southbound view of the station platforms, October 2022

General information
- Location: Railway Parade, Kiama; New South Wales; Australia
- Coordinates: 34°40′21″S 150°51′17″E
- Elevation: 20 metres (66 ft)
- Owner: Transport Asset Manager of New South Wales
- Operator: Sydney Trains
- Line: South Coast
- Distance: 119.160 kilometres (74.043 mi) from Central
- Platforms: 2 (island), 194 and 196 metres
- Train operators: Sydney Trains
- Bus operators: Premier Illawarra; Kiama Coaches

Construction
- Structure type: At-grade
- Parking: 40 spaces
- Cycle facilities: Yes
- Accessible: Yes

Other information
- Status: Staffed
- Website: Transport for NSW

History
- Opened: 2 June 1893
- Electrified: 17 November 2001

Passengers
- 2025: 331,755 (year); 908 (daily) (Sydney Trains, NSW TrainLink)

Services
Preceding station	Intercity Trains	Following station
Terminus	South Coast Line	Bombo towards Central or Bondi Junction
Gerringong towards Bomaderry	South Coast Line Bomaderry Shuttle	Terminus
Location
Notes
- Storage siding, 60' turntable

Kiama railway station is a heritage-listed intercity train station located in Kiama, New South Wales, Australia, on the South Coast railway line. The station serves Sydney Trains diesel multiple unit trains traveling south to Bomaderry and electric multiple unit trains north to Wollongong and Sydney. Early morning and late night services to and from stations to the south are provided by train replacement bus services. It was added to the New South Wales State Heritage Register on 2 April 1999.

== History ==
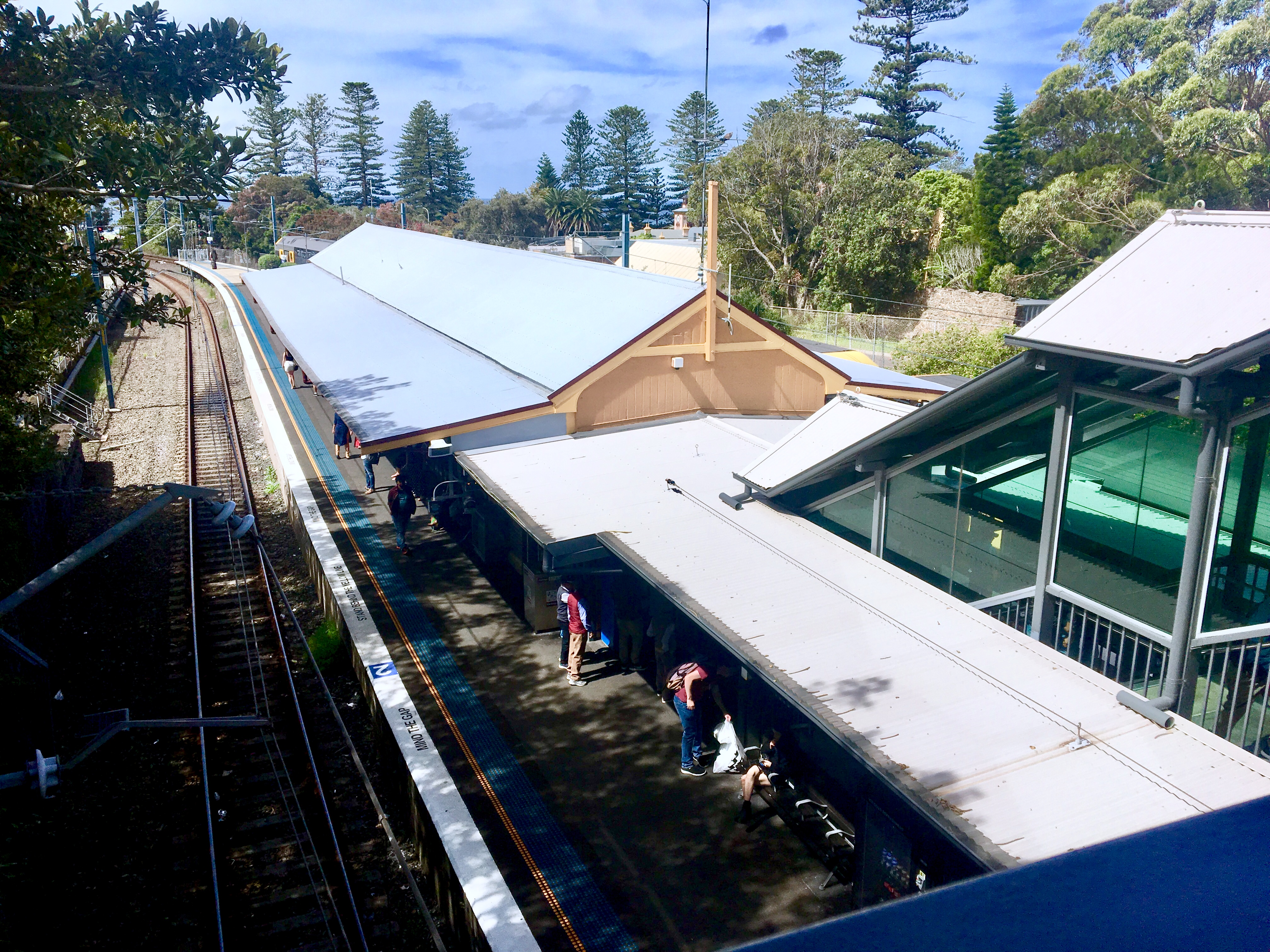
Northbound view to platforms, seen from footbridge

As a seaside town, Kiama was initially reliant on coastal shipping for its links to Wollongong and Sydney. The railway first arrived in the Kiama district in November 1887, with the opening of a new station at North Kiama (since renamed Bombo), on the town's northern outskirts. The terminus was only a temporary arrangement, however: the NSW Government Railways had already signed contracts to further extend the railway south the previous year. Kiama was the northernmost station on that extension, built by firm of W. Monie & J. Angus between 1886 and 1893. The new station opened in June 1893.

Kiama was built as a passenger station and combined signal box on an island platform in the centre of the town. The goods yard was also opened and a locomotive sub-depot south of the station. From the timber footbridge, an elaborate landing and covered stair led down to the platform and the brick station was the first example of its type, the design of which was used at many stations built over the next 30 years. The design of the footbridge and stairs (plans dated 1892) were signed by Henry Deane. The line remains a single track with a crossing loop at the station.

The Kiama Railway Station yard was originally huge, extending from Terralong Street at the north end to Barney Street to the south. NSW Railways plans dated 1925 for "Station Arrangements" show (from north to south): a cottage south of Terralong Street; platform extensions and removal of a lamp room from the platform; retaining walls; a cream loading platform on the east side of the yard, east of the platform; tanks under the Bong Bong Street overbridge and a rest house southeast of the overbridge; a cattle yards and weighbridge southeast of the overbridge; and further south, stock yards and an engine shed and turntable (west of rail lines); a goods shed with platform and loading stage, and east of these, another rest house. At the far southern end of the yard, on the south-eastern side, was the Station Master's residence and the Dairy Farmers Co-operative Milk Company building (just north of the Barney Street overbridge).

Structures that have since disappeared include the footbridge and stairs, the Station Master's residence, the Bong Bong Street overbridge, the goods shed and the engine shed. A Dairy Farmers Co-Op siding and a N.S.W. Produce Company siding opened in 1947 are also no longer used. Ash pits are shown in the 1925 plan of the station arrangements, north of the turntable: one within the (no longer extant) engine shed and one north of the engine shed.

Electric trains began operating on the line from Dapto to Kiama in November 2001, but the line to the south has remained as non-electrified single track. Since 2001, northbound trains from Bomaderry terminate at Kiama, requiring passengers to change to electric multiple unit services heading north. In 2005, the then Minister for Transport, John Watkins, announced that electrification would be extended to the terminus at Bomaderry at an unspecified future date, but the proposal did not progress.

Kiama Station was upgraded to be wheelchair accessible in 2003, with a lift to the platform completed with a concrete footbridge link to Eddy Street and concrete stairs. In 2014, electronic ticketing in the form of the Opal card became available at the station. Planning is currently underway to extend the platforms by about 8 metres to accommodate 10 car D sets.

== Platforms and services ==
Kiama has one island platform with two sides. It is serviced by Sydney Trains South Coast line electric services from Sydney and diesel multiple unit services from Bomaderry. Services to Sydney Central and Bomaderry usually depart from platform 2, while platform 1 is used when platform 2 is occupied by a terminating train.

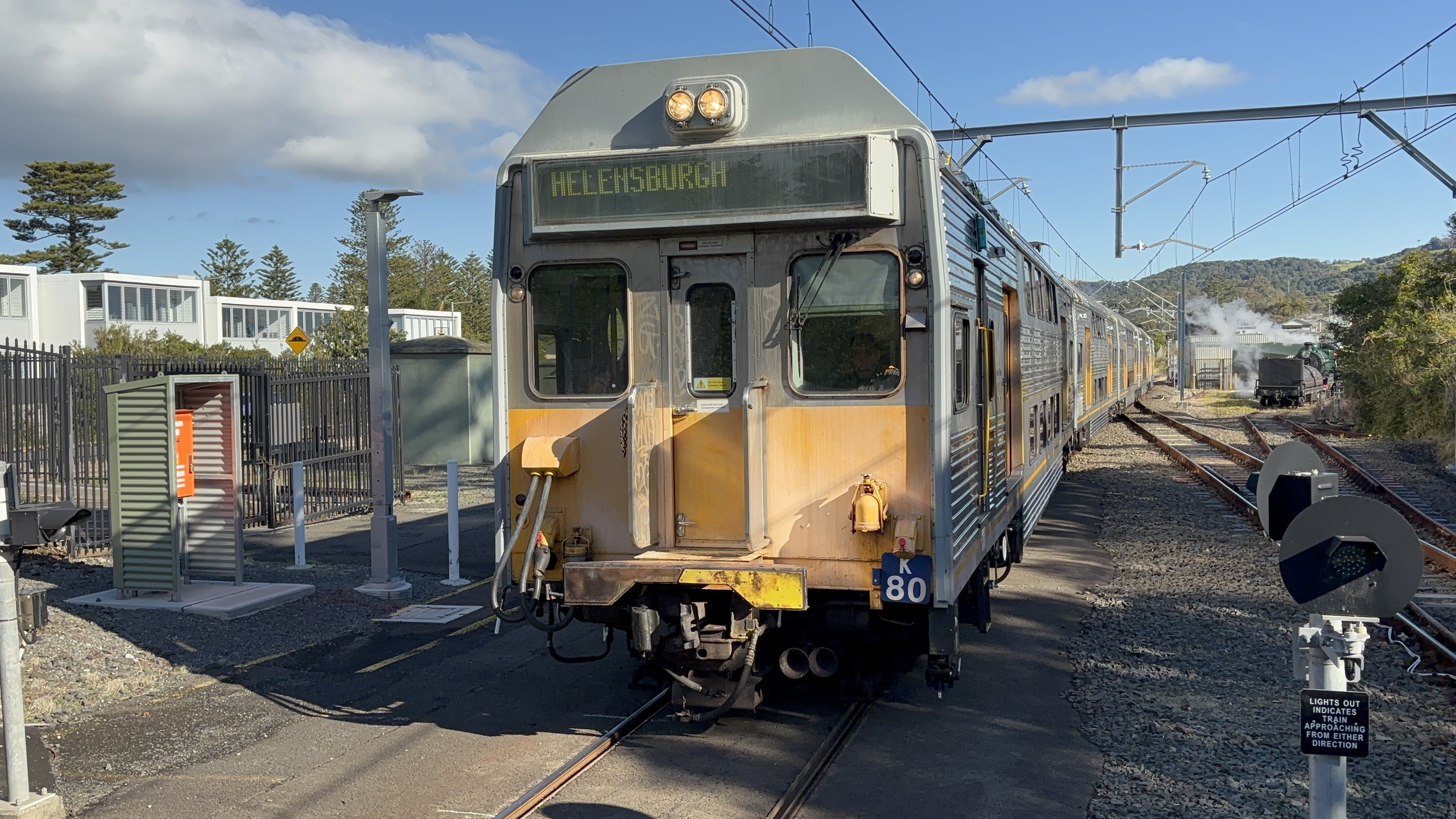
K66 arriving into Kiama Station

Platform	Line	Stopping pattern	Notes
1	South Coast Line	services to and from Bomaderry, Central and Bondi Junction	
2	South Coast Line	services to and from Bomaderry, Central and Bondi Junction	

== Transport links ==
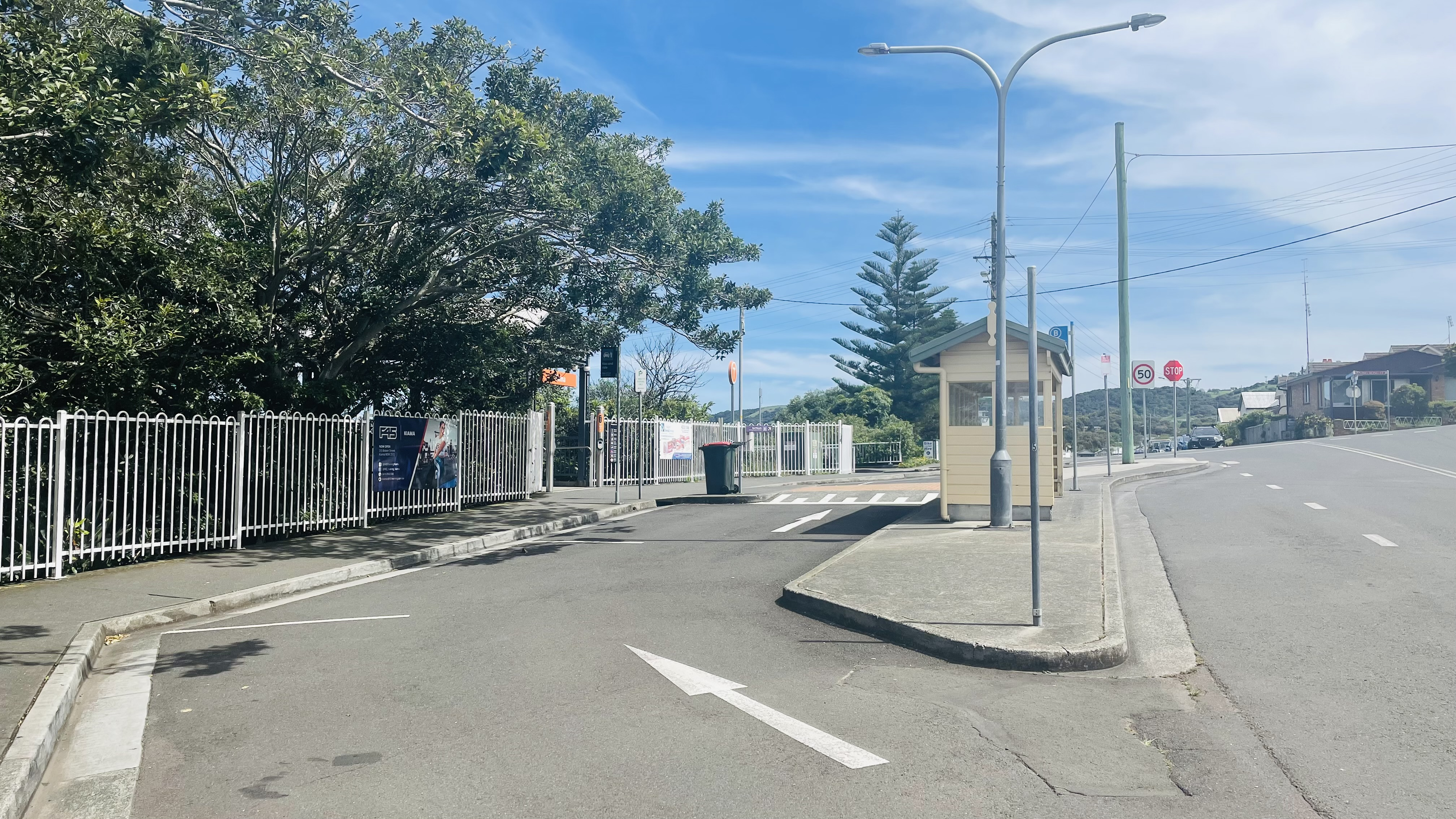
Bus stop, drop off zone and entrance on Railway Parade

Premier Illawarra operates one bus route via Kiama station, under contract to Transport for NSW:

- 71: Stockland Shellharbour to Kiama Hospital

Kiama Coaches operate two routes via Kiama Station:

- 125: to Seven Mile Beach via Gerringong & Gerroa
- 126: to Minnamurra Falls via Jamberoo

== Description ==
The station complex includes the platform building and island platform (1893), turntable (1897), Bong Bong Street overbridge (c. 1990) and footbridge (2005).

Platform building (1893)

This is a single storey painted brick building (painted in heritage colors: brick colour for walls; drab for stucco reveals to windows and doors; manilla for window frames and doors) with a gabled corrugated steel roof with timber tongue & grooved boarding to gable ends. The building has timber framed double hung windows with 9 paned top sashes with coloured glass panes to top sashes and frosted glass to bottom sashes. The majority of doors are timber paneled, and there are some timber paneled double doors, all with multipaned fanlights (some fanlights covered over). Door and window openings have elaborate sandstone reveals and triangular pediments. The awnings on both sides of the building have corrugated steel skillion roofs and elaborate decorative steel awning brackets, mounted on sandstone wall brackets.

There is a small weatherboard addition to the south end of the main platform building which has 4 early stop chamfered timber posts at each corner, indicating that this is a weatherboard infill structure within an originally open awning structure. There are modern security screens to windows, and some modern timber flush doors. There is a brick screen wall to the north end of building to screen the entry to men's toilets.

Internally, the waiting area has modern floor tiling, and modern ticket windows, timber panelled double doors both sides with frosted glass 8 paned fanlights, a later ceiling with timber battens, and later timber veneer panelling to around 2m height internally to the waiting room. Offices also have later ceilings and later timber veneer panelling to around 2m height (indicating possible presence of rising damp).

Platform (1893)

The island platform generally has a concrete face but its face is open at the northern end. The platform surface is asphalt.

Turntable (1897) and ash pits

A 60-foot (18 m) turntable located southeast of the southern end of Eddy Street. The turntable is a sunken circular brick edged structure with a single rail on timber sleepers running around the inside, and a cast iron turntable machine in the centre of the circle marked "William Sellers & Co. Philadelphia No. 1327". The brick edging of the turntable has a soldier course capping, but is otherwise in stretcher bond.

Two rectangular ash pits were reportedly located to the north of the turntable, one of which was formerly within the now no longer extant engine shed. These were described in an earlier study and on historic plans, but were not confirmed to be extant at the time of the station's heritage listing.

Footbridge (2005)

A modern concrete, steel and glass structure with lift and stairs to platform, also modern canopy connecting platform building to the footbridge.

Bong Bong Street Overbridge (c. 2005)

A modern concrete road overbridge with concrete piers, located south of the footbridge. Excluded from listing.

Landscape/natural features

There are views from the Station footbridge and platform to the southeast to the ocean and Norfolk Island pine plantings along the Kiama ocean frontage respectively.

Condition

The platform building and island platform were in good condition at the time of the heritage listing, with the modern footbridge and overbridge in very good condition. The condition of the turntable was unknown, and it was unclear if the ash pits were still extant.

The platform and platform building are intact except for minor additions (modern platform canopies). The yard structures at Kiama (with the exception of the turntable and possibly the ash pits) have been removed.

== Heritage listing ==
Kiama Railway Station group – including the platform, platform building, turntable and ash pits – are of State heritage significance. Kiama Railway Station is of historical significance as the first railway station on this section of the Bankstown Line completed in 1893 from Central to Lidcombe and for its role as a transport hub for the town of Kiama since 1893. The turntable and ash pits are remnant structures from a once substantial yard layout which served the dairying and pastoral industries. The Kiama Railway Station 1893 platform building is of aesthetic significance as the first example of an island platform building that became the model for the standard plans for this building type, known as A8–A10, issued by the NSW Railways in 1899. The building has particularly fine detailing to platform facades and awnings. The Kiama turntable is rare (one of only 3 turntables now extant on the Illawarra line – Bomaderry, Waterfall and Kiama) and of technical significance.

Kiama railway station was listed on the New South Wales State Heritage Register on 2 April 1999 having satisfied the following criteria.

The place is important in demonstrating the course, or pattern, of cultural or natural history in New South Wales.

Kiama Railway Station is of historical significance as the first railway station on this section of the Illawarra line completed in 1893 from Bombo to Bomaderry, and for its role as a transport hub for the town of Kiama since 1893. The yard remains are remnant structures from a once substantial yard layout which served the dairying and pastoral industries.

The place is important in demonstrating aesthetic characteristics and/or a high degree of creative or technical achievement in New South Wales.

The Kiama Railway Station's 1893 platform building is of esthetic significance as the first example of an island platform building that became the model for the standard A8-A10 plans issued in 1899. The building has particularly fine detailing to platform facades and awnings. The turntable is of technical significance as evidence of late 19th century railway technology.

The place has strong or special association with a particular community or cultural group in New South Wales for social, cultural or spiritual reasons.

The place has the potential to contribute to the local community's sense of place, and can provide a connection to the local community's past.

The place possesses uncommon, rare or endangered aspects of the cultural or natural history of New South Wales.

The Kiama turntable is rare (one of only 3 turntables now extant on the Illawarra line – Bomaderry, Waterfall and Kiama).

The place is important in demonstrating the principal characteristics of a class of cultural or natural places/environments in New South Wales.

The Kiama Railway Station platform building is considered a fine representative platform building of the design later known as A8–A10, predating the issue of the standard designs in 1899, and forming a model for platform buildings of this design.
