= Bomaderry railway station =

Railway station in New South Wales, Australia

Bomaderry
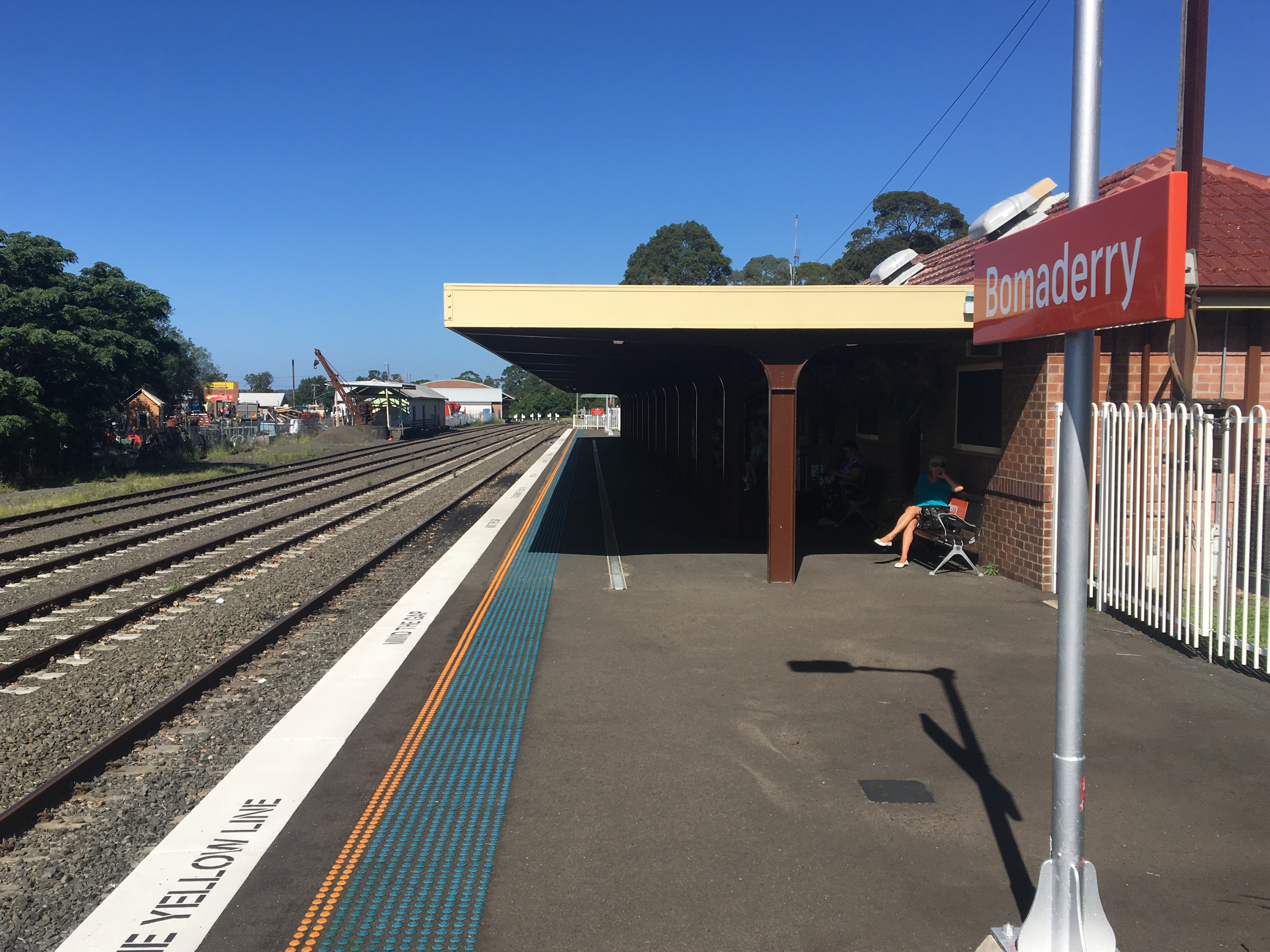
- Bomaderry in April 2019

General information
- Location: Meroo Street, Bomaderry; New South Wales; Australia
- Coordinates: 34°51′14″S 150°36′35″E
- Elevation: 10 metres (33 ft)
- Owner: Transport Asset Manager of New South Wales
- Operator: Sydney Trains
- Line: South Coast
- Distance: 153.348 kilometres (95.286 mi) from Sydney Central
- Platforms: 1
- Tracks: 4
- Bus operators: Nowra Coaches; Shoal Bus

Construction
- Structure type: At-grade
- Parking: Yes
- Cycle facilities: Yes
- Accessible: Yes
- Architectural style: Inter-war functionalism

Other information
- Status: Staffed
- Website: Transport for NSW

History
- Opened: 2 June 1893
- Former names: Nowra; Bomaderry (Nowra)

Passengers
- 2025: 148,761 (year); 407 (daily) (Sydney Trains, NSW TrainLink)

Services
Preceding station	Intercity Trains	Following station
Terminus	South Coast Line Bomaderry Shuttle	Berry towards Kiama
Location

Bomaderry railway station is a heritage-listed single-platform intercity train station located in Bomaderry, New South Wales, Australia, on the South Coast railway line. The station serves diesel multiple unit trains to Kiama operated by Sydney Trains. Early morning and late night services to the station are provided by train replacement bus services. A siding near the station is used by freight trains operated by the Manildra Group.

The station was added to the New South Wales State Heritage Register on 2 April 1999.

== History ==
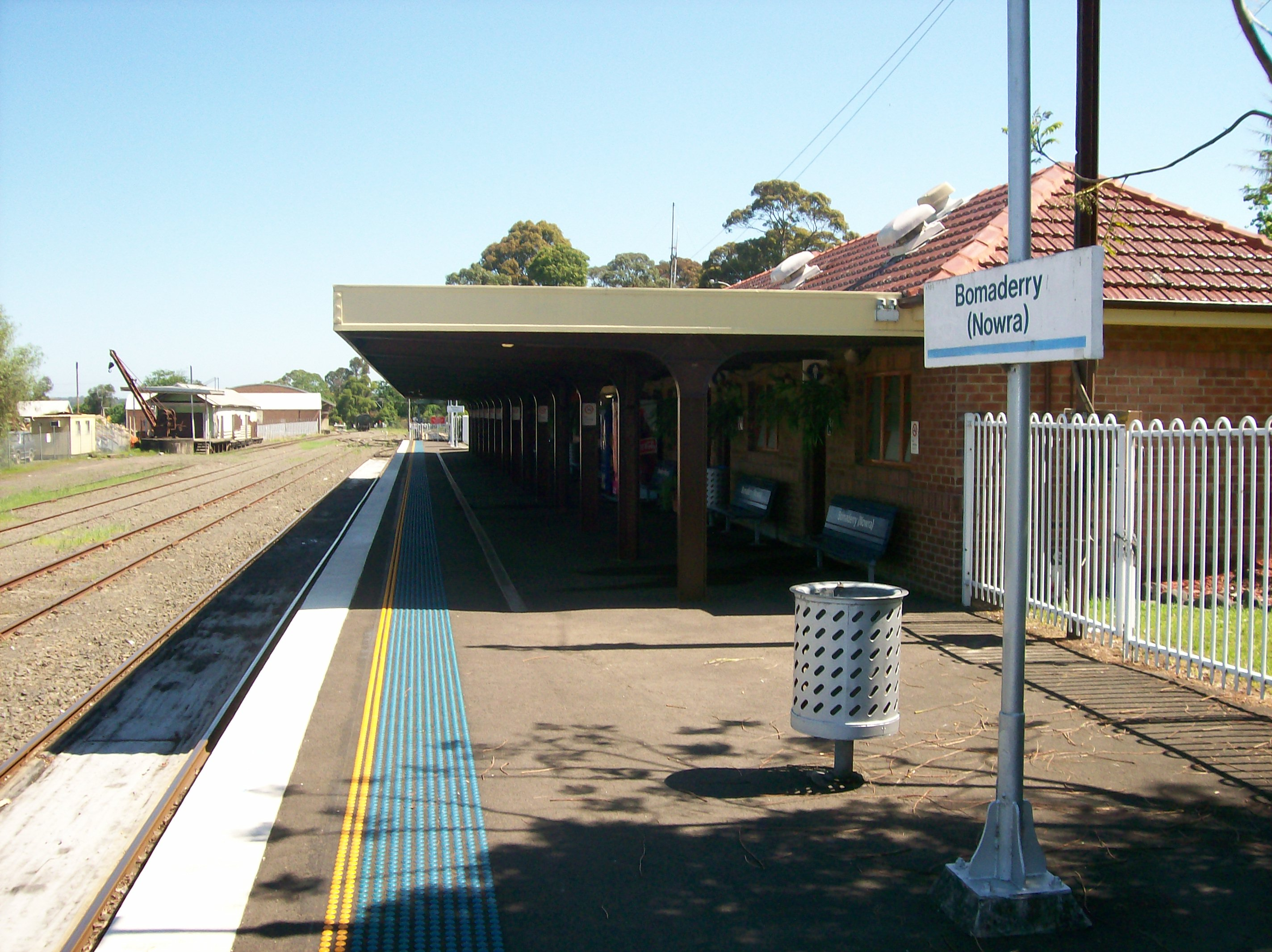
Bomaderry railway station c. 2005

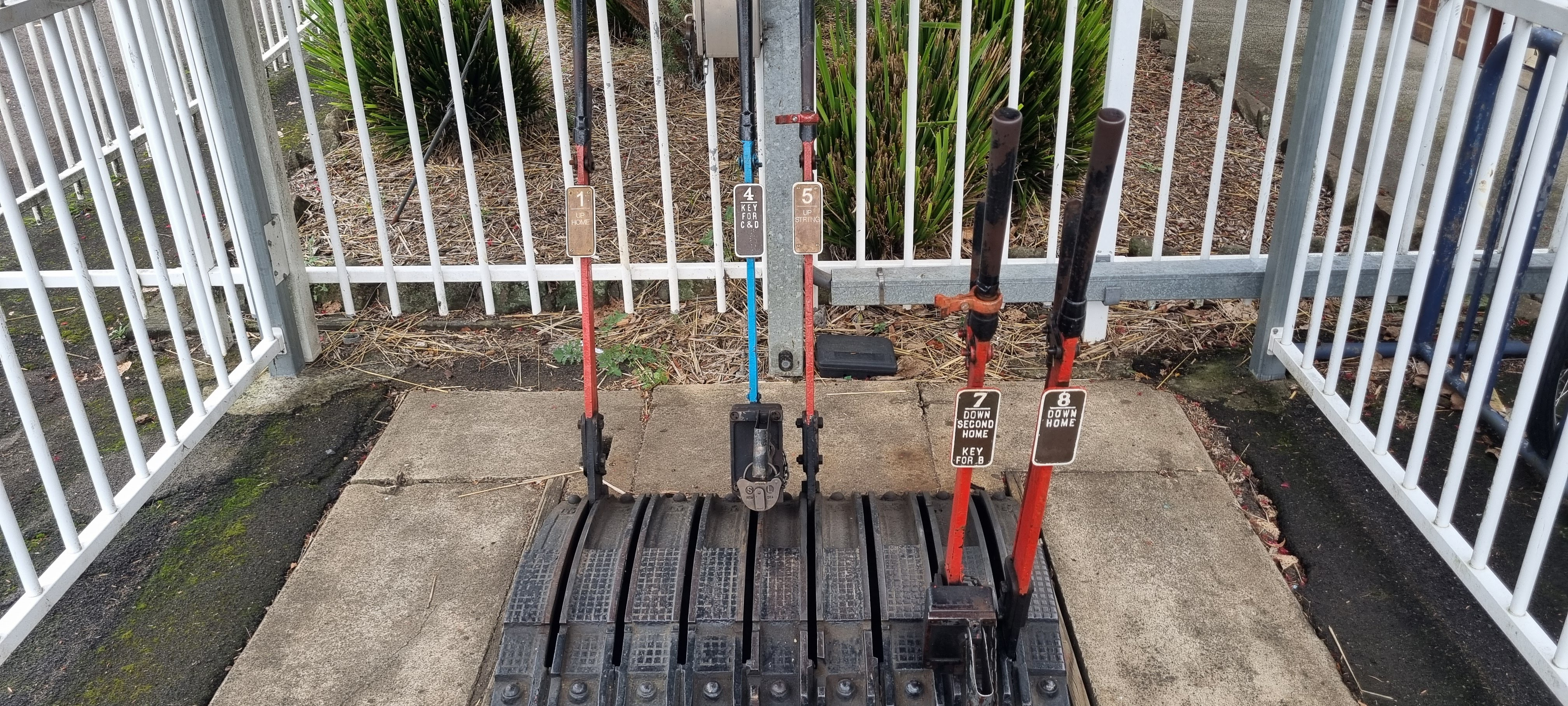
Bomaderry is the only Sydney Trains station that still uses Semaphore signals and Lever frames located on the platform

In 1887, the southern terminus of the South Coast Line reached "North Kiama Station" (now known as Bombo). The NSW Government Railways intended for the line to eventually connect with the Sydney network in the north, and Jervis Bay or even Eden in the south. In 1886, the firm of W. Monie & J. Angus was awarded the contract to begin the extension south. Bomaderry Railway Station opened on 2 June 1893 as the new – and, it was assumed, temporary – southern terminus. But while the connection to Sydney opened in October 1888, progress towards Jervis Bay stalled.

The former Station Master's residence, along with the goods shed, timber trestle bridge over Shoalhaven Creek, and the Edwards Avenue Bomaderry timber overbridge, are among the few remaining structures from the 1893 construction period of the extension of the Illawarra Railway Line from Bombo.

Now confirmed as a permanent railhead, and with Nowra on the Shoalhaven's opposite bank expanding, Bomaderry Station's significance grew. A large goods yard was added, along with a turntable, dairy siding (1921), weighbridge (1921), railway crew barracks (1924) and crane (1934). Initially the station yard included an 1893 platform, platform building and goods shed, as well as coal and watering facilities and a 50-foot (15.24 m) turntable that was replaced in 1914 by a 60-foot (18.29 m) turntable. Plans dated 1928 but with later 1930s notations show a platform building, goods shed, carriage shed (north of the station masters house), coal stage and engine shed (the coal stage marked on the plans as being removed in 1936), These plans are also annotated "Trucking yards removed and land sold to the Nowra Dairy Coy 7.7.1938". The jib crane is marked on these plans as being installed in 1934 adjacent to the goods shed and the shed extended in 1944. The goods yard and goods shed were further extended in 1944 as a wartime measure. In recent years part of this has been sold, including the 1921 weighbridge and office.

In 1929, a Vacuum Oil Company siding was added and about the same time a private siding was branched off the yard towards the river to Horlickes Works and in 1956 extended to Wiggin's Teape and Nash Paper Mills Ltd's factories. Hayes and Kidd's Siding was opened in 1953.

The original platform building was destroyed in a fire in 1945 and rebuilt in the inter-war functionalist style the following year. According to the Heritage Branch, "The building is divided into three bays, each recessed behind the other to create a "stepped" effect. There are two semi-circular ended lobbies flanking the projecting parcels office on the west elevation. The circular lobby has been achieved by the use of projecting square masonry ribs (rather than callow bricks) to support a flat, concrete slab roof over the lobbies. ... one of the finest representative examples of an inter-war functionalist style railway building in the state. ... particularly noteworthy for its use of curved elements."

Bomaderry was also noteworthy as the terminus for the last section of the NSW metropolitan rail network to use the electric staff signalling system. The system, installed in 1908, was replaced with automated signalling in 2014.

== Operations ==
Between 1933 and 1991, Bomaderry was the terminus of a direct, limited-stops service to Sydney, known as the South Coast Daylight Express. Today, most services are shuttles between Bomaderry and the end of the electrified network at Kiama. In 2005, then Minister for Transport, John Watkins, announced that electrification would be extended to Bomaderry at an unspecified future date, but that has not been done.

Electronic ticketing, in the form of the Opal smart card, has been available at Bomaderry since 2014.

In 2026, the government pledged to begin work to electrify the line in 2027.

== Track layout ==
The Bomaderry yard contains four tracks: a platform road, a passing loop and two goods sidings. A security compound for overnight storage of trains is located on a small siding south of the station. A 1.8-kilometre "master siding" diverges from the number-two goods siding opposite the station, passes over Railway Street and Bolong Road, and passes Shoalhaven Steel Supplies, Shoalhaven Starches (Manildra Group) and the former dairy.

== Platforms and services ==
Bomaderry has one platform. It is served by Sydney Trains South Coast line services to and from Kiama.

Platform	Line	Stopping pattern	Notes
1	South Coast Line	Services to & from Kiama	

== Transport links ==
Kennedy's Tours operate three routes from Bomaderry station:

- 110: to Greenwell Point
- 111: to Orient Point
- 112: to Kangaroo Valley

Nowra Coaches operate three routes from Bomaderry station:

- 101: to Wollongong University Shoalhaven Campus
- 102: to Basin View
- 103: to Hyams Beach

Shoalbus operates three routes via Bomaderry Station:

- 139: to Shoalhaven Heads
- 131: Bomaderry loop service
- 135: to Sussex Inlet

Stuart's Coaches operate one route via Bomaderry station:

- 120: to Currarong via Myola

== Description ==
The heritage-listed station precinct includes the platform building (1946), goods shed (1893, 1944), station master's residence (1893), platform (1934, 1946), turntable (1914), jib crane (1934) and signals.

Bomaderry Station is entered from the west via the central projecting semi-circular lobby of the 1946 platform building. There is a car park (accessed from Meroo Street) immediately to the west of the platform building. There is a single perimeter platform on the eastern side of the 1946 platform building, and at the southern end of the platform is the horse dock and signals.

The station perimeter is defined by white powder coated aluminium fencing.

There are a set of points on the platform in an aluminium fenced enclosure at the southern end of the platform beneath a flat corrugated steel roofed shelter carried on 4 steel posts.

The yard stretches to the north, south and east of the platform building and platform. The goods shed, with jib crane at its northern end, is located to the southeast of the platform and visible from it. The weighbridge (no longer in RailCorp ownership) is on the eastern side of the railway lines. The turntable is at the far southern end of the railway yard and not visible from the platform.

The Station Master's residence is on the west side of the railway lines, north of the Bomaderry station car park. The residence faces the Railway Station car park to the south of the property, not Meroo Street, which is to the west boundary of the property. The site is fenced with cyclone wire fencing.

Tree plantings south of the station car park, north of the platform building and in the residence garden.

A planting bed with the name of the station "Bomaderry" spelt out in closely planted and tightly clipped bedding plants is in the corridor opposite the platform, The garden bed is edged with railway sleepers laid flat reinforced by a length of old rail to act as a vehicle wheel bumper.
