= Bombo railway station =

Railway station in New South Wales, Australia

Bombo
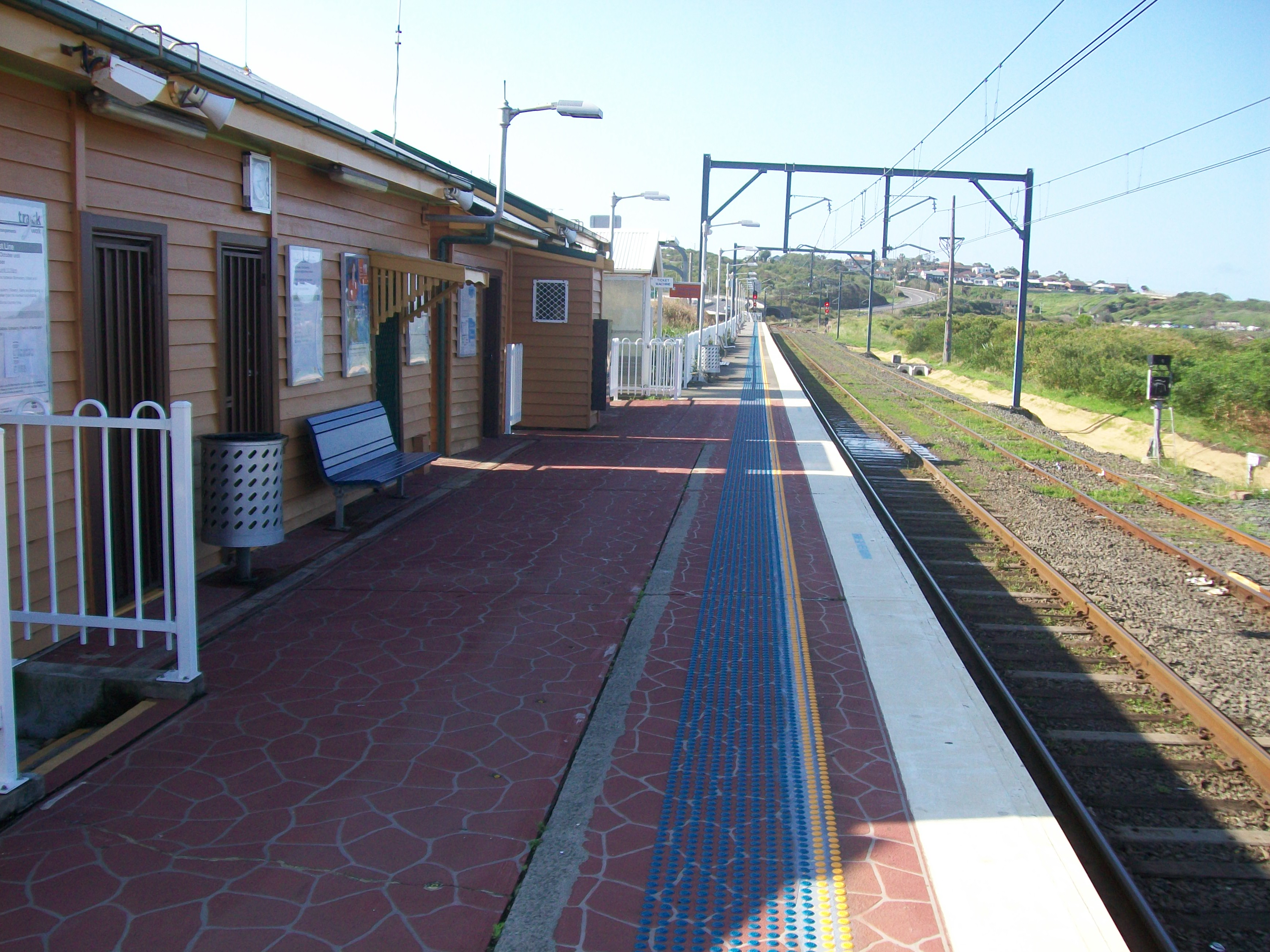
- Northbound view from the station platform, January 2008

General information
- Location: Princes Highway, Bombo; New South Wales; Australia
- Coordinates: 34.6584°S 150.8539°E
- Elevation: 11 metres (36 ft)
- Owner: Transport Asset Manager of New South Wales
- Line: South Coast
- Distance: 117.551 kilometres (73.043 mi) from Central
- Platforms: 1, 196 metres
- Tracks: 3
- Train operators: Sydney Trains
- Bus operators: Premier Illawarra

Construction
- Structure type: At-grade
- Parking: 8 spaces
- Accessible: Yes

Other information
- Website: Transport for NSW

History
- Opened: 9 November 1887
- Electrified: 17 November 2001
- Former names: North Kiama (1887–1889; 1893–1907); Kiama (1889–1893)

Passengers
- 2025: 17,998 (year); 49 (daily) (Sydney Trains, NSW TrainLink)

Services
Preceding station	Intercity Trains	Following station
Kiama Terminus	South Coast Line	Minnamurra towards Central or Bondi Junction
Location

Bombo railway station is a heritage-listed single-platform intercity train station located at Bombo, in the Illawarra region of New South Wales, Australia. The station is served by the Sydney Trains South Coast line, with trains travelling south to Kiama and north to Wollongong and Sydney. It was added to the New South Wales State Heritage Register on 2 April 1999.

== History ==
Bombo station opened as the temporary South Coast Line terminus in 1887 under the name North Kiama Railway Station. The town of Kiama, situated among fingers of hard basaltic rock running down from Saddleback Mountain to the sea, presented something of a barrier to the railway's progress further south. It had an open platform with a standard timber platform building completed in 1888, and due to its terminus status, received a turntable, watering facilities and an engine shed. This function was to continue until 1897, even when the line had been completed to Bomaderry in 1893. The station was renamed to Kiama in May 1889 and was again named North Kiama in 1893.

Over the course of the next six years after its opening, engineers and workers from the firm of W. Monie & J. Angus worked to excavate the five tunnels required to bring the line through Kiama and onto the coastal plain beyond. North Kiama station lost its terminal status in 1893 and declined in importance, losing its locomotive turntable to Kiama four years later.

Though it no longer served the town proper, the station and yard remained important to the NSW Government Railways' basalt quarry at nearby Bombo Point, where mining had started in 1880. The station was renamed Bombo in 1907. A small yard was developed that also served later for the use of quarrying and other industries in the area. Next to the original station building the present pre-cast concrete signal box was built in 1925 to help in handling the extra quarry, goods and passenger traffic. The station yard retains a 523-metre passing loop and 159-metre down siding.

At an unknown recent date, the platform was extended to north and south, the centre of the platform resurfaced with coloured stamped concrete, and a modern platform canopy built towards the northern end of the platform.

The line from Dapto to Kiama was electrified on 17 November 2001, allowing electric multiple unit trains to run between Sydney and Bombo; the signal box was decommissioned around the same time. In 2009, the station became unattended following a network-wide review of low-patronage stations. In 2014, electronic ticketing in the form of the Opal smart card became available at the station.

Being sandwiched between Bombo Beach on one side and the six-lane Princes Highway on the other, and with only the quarries and a cemetery opposite, the station has a limited walking catchment and very low patronage (3,374 passenger movements in 2014). Critics have suggested that trains no longer stop at Bombo, arguing for a new station to the north in the centre of Kiama Downs. This proposal has not progressed, however.

== Platforms and services ==
Bombo has one platform. It is serviced by Sydney Trains South Coast line services travelling between Sydney Central, Bondi Junction and Kiama.

Platform	Line	Stopping pattern	Notes
1	South Coast Line	services to Sydney Central, Bondi Junction & Kiama	

== Transport links ==
Premier Illawarra operates one bus route via Bombo station, under contract to Transport for NSW:

- 71: Stockland Shellharbour to Kiama

== Description ==
The station complex includes the type 14 platform building (1887), the out of room (c. 1887), the signal box (1925), the platform canopy (modern), the platform (1887), and the signals in the signal box.

The station is located on the eastern side of the Princes Highway, just east of the ocean beach at Bombo. The site has views in all directions, including of the ocean, ocean beach, Bombo escarpment to the west, southern headland of Kiama to the south. The station is entered from the south via a ramp off the Princes Highway footpath which skirts the station. The station perimeters are defined with white powdercoated aluminium fencing. There is a layback off the eastern side of the Princes Highway south of the station to allow vehicles to drop off passengers.

=== Platform building (1887) ===
Externally it is an awningless single-storey weatherboard platform building with a gabled corrugated steel roof and weatherboard tongue & grooved board eaves. There are five doors opening onto the platform, one doorway (to the waiting room) has a simple timber fretwork awning. There is one timber framed double hung window to the northern end of the building's east (platform) elevation. The building has a blank facade facing the Princes Highway to the west. The building has a skillion roofed toilet addition at the southern end, with a single modern flush timber door, and timber louvres and highlight fixed obscure glass window towards the uppermost part of the walls.

The interior (from south to north) contains: toilets (in southern addition); store room, waiting room and booking office. The waiting room has modern floor tiling, fibre-cement sheet wall linings and gyprock ceiling with neon strip lighting, and three timber seats.

=== Out of room (1887) ===
A weatherboard single storey building with a gabled corrugated steel roof, modern timber flush doors to east and west, c.1920s architraves to the doors, and a single timber framed double hung window to the north elevation.

It was being used as a storeroom in 2009.

=== Signal box (1925) ===
A reinforced concrete drop panel signal box with a gabled corrugated steel roof. There is a timber porch attached to this building on the platform (east elevation) of the building. The building has original timber sliding windows with horizontal glazing bars.

The interior has no wall linings, and contains the original signals.

=== Platform (1887) ===
The platform has a concrete edge, concrete surface and a recent stamped concrete surface in the middle of the platform. There are platform extensions to both north and south ends. There is a remnant timber foundation structure on brick piers beneath some of the platform buildings, and rare remnant brick paved platform surface between the out-of-room and the former signals building.

=== Platform canopy (modern) ===
At the far northern end of the platform is a modern platform canopy on steel posts with concrete bases, an aluminium mesh wall to the Princes Highway, and a gabled Colorbond roof.

=== Moveable items ===
The quadrant signals are extant within the 1925 signal box.

=== Landscape and natural features ===
Bombo Railway Station has an exceptional landscape setting, with views east to the ocean, views south to Kiama, and views west to the Princes Highway and rising land beyond.

=== Condition ===
The platform building, out of room, signal box, platform canopy, platform and signals in signal box were all reported to be in good condition as at 1 September 2010.

== Heritage listing ==
Bombo Railway Station is of State historical significance as a station originally built as a terminus for the isolated section of the Illawarra Line (Scarborough to Bombo) from 1887, connected to Sydney and extended past Bombo to Bomaderry in 1893, retaining its 1887 weatherboard platform building, out-of-room, remnant early platform foundations and brick paved platform surface, and 1925 signal box with original signal levers.

Bombo Railway Station is of State aesthetic significance for its outstanding landscape setting, with a sense of isolation, a basalt escarpment to the west, immediate ocean beachfrontage, coastal heath, and extensive views in all directions. Bombo Railway Station and its setting feature in numerous historical photographs.

The collection of the 1887 platform building, the out-of-room platform, and the 1925 signal box and signals is rare. The awningless weatherboard platform building is locally rare as one of only three examples on the Illawarra line (other examples at Berry railway station and the now disused Dunmore (Shellharbour) station).

Bombo railway station was listed on the New South Wales State Heritage Register on 2 April 1999, having satisfied the following criteria.

The place is important in demonstrating the course, or pattern, of cultural or natural history in New South Wales.

Bombo Railway Station is of historical significance as a station originally built as a terminus for the isolated section of the Illawarra Line (Scarborough to Bombo) from 1887, retaining 1887 weatherboard platform building, out-of-room, remnant early platform foundations and brick paved platform surface, and 1925 signal box with its original signals. The landscape setting of Bombo Railway Station with its isolation, immediate ocean frontage and extensive views in all directions, is of historical significance as it features in numerous historical photographs.

The place is important in demonstrating aesthetic characteristics and/or a high degree of creative or technical achievement in New South Wales.

Bombo Railway Station buildings are of State aesthetic significance as a collection of early (1887-1925) rural platform building including a rare awningless platform building, out of room and concrete drop-slab signal box. Bombo Railway Station is of State aesthetic significance for its outstanding landscape setting with its sense of isolation, basalt escarpment to the west, immediate ocean beach frontage with coastal heath and extensive spectacular views in all directions, including significant views south to Kiama.

The place has a strong or special association with a particular community or cultural group in New South Wales for social, cultural or spiritual reasons.

The place has the potential to contribute to the local community's sense of place, and can provide a connection to the local community's past.

The place possesses uncommon, rare or endangered aspects of the cultural or natural history of New South Wales.

This item is assessed as historically rare. This item is assessed as scientifically rare. This item is assessed as architecturally rare. This item is assessed as socially rare.
